= Barbuise =

Commune in Grand Est, France

- Commune
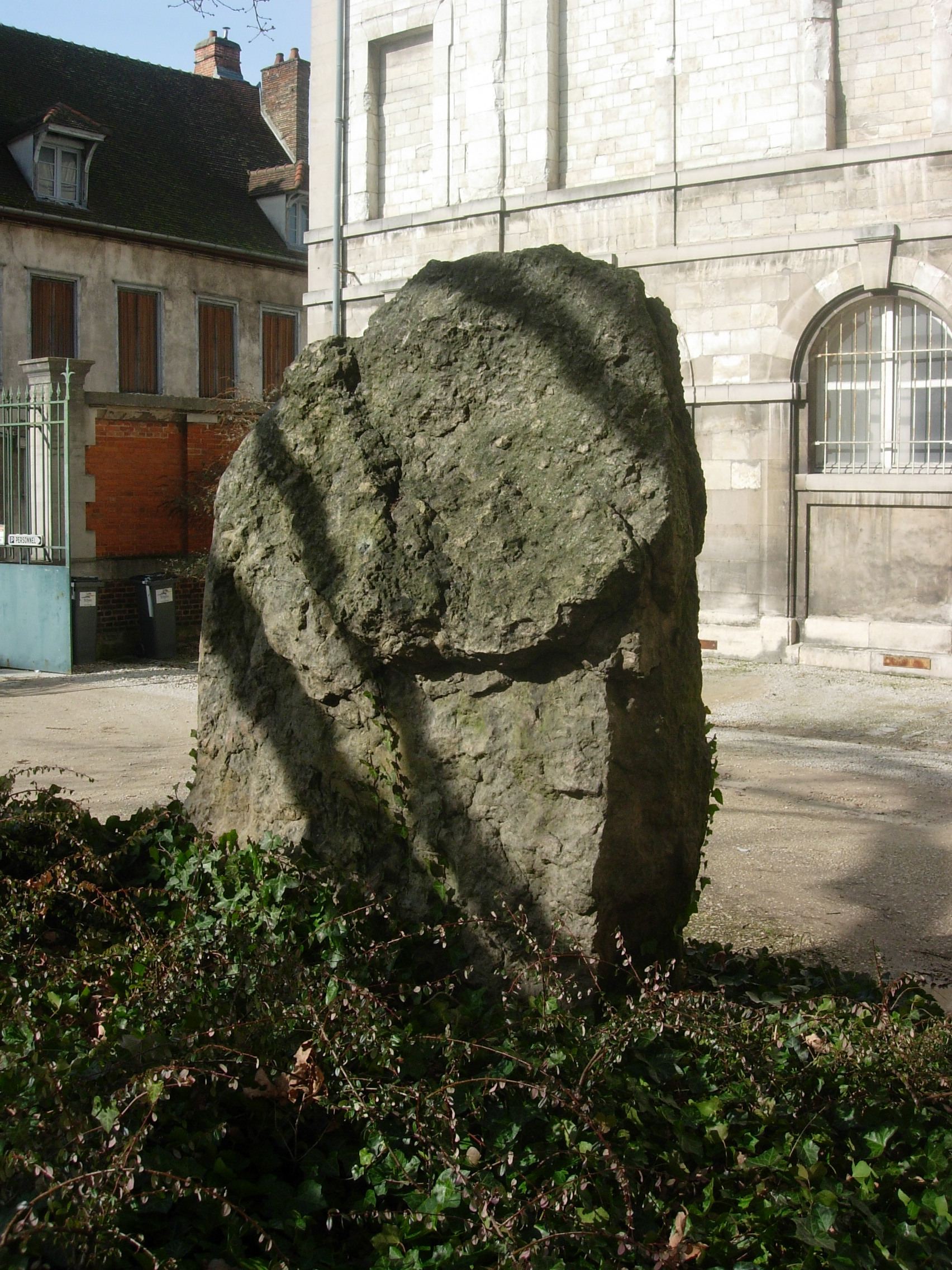
- Menhir
- Location of Barbuise
- Location within France Location within Grand Est
- Coordinates: 48°33′32″N 3°34′39″E
- Country: France
- Region: Grand Est
- Department: Aube
- Arrondissement: Nogent-sur-Seine
- Canton: Nogent-sur-Seine
- Intercommunality: Nogentais

Government
  - Mayor (2020–2026): Alain Boyer
- Area^{1}: 18.09 km^{2} (6.98 sq mi)
- Elevation: 68 m (223 ft)
- Population (2023): 433
  - Density: 23.9/km^{2} (62.0/sq mi)
- Time zone: UTC+01:00 (CET)
  - Summer (DST): UTC+02:00 (CEST)
- INSEE/Postal code: 10031 /10400
- ^{1} French Land Register data, which excludes lakes, ponds, glaciers > 1 km^{2} (0.386 sq mi or 247 acres) and river estuaries.

Barbuise (French pronunciation: [baʁbɥiz]) is a commune in the Aube department in the Grand Est region of north-central France.

== Geography ==
Barbuise is located some 45 km north-west of Troyes and 20 km east of Provins. Access to the commune is by the D40 from La Villeneuve-au-Châtelot in the east which passes through the heart of the commune south of the village and continues west then south-west to join the D40A to Chalautre-la-Grande. The D52 comes from Villenauxe-la-Grande in the north and passes through the village before continuing south-east to Pont-sur-Seine. The D97 goes north-west from the village to Montpothier. The D174 branches off the D97 west of the village and goes north to Plessis-Barbuise. The D197 connects the D40 and the D97 in the west of the commune. The commune is almost all farmland with many lakes occupying a significant area of land in a belt across the commune and in the south-east.

The Canal de Courtavant crosses the south-east of the commune from south-west to north-east. The Noxe river flows from the north passing near the village and joins the canal. The Canal de Soulaunoy joins the Noxe south-west of the village.

== History ==
The area of the commune has been occupied since ancient times as evidenced by many archaeological discoveries and megaliths in the commune.

Barbuise appears as Barbuiſe on the 1750 Cassini Map and as Barbuise on the 1790 version.

== Administration ==
List of Successive Mayors

From	To	Name
	1857	Dupont
	1887	Célestin Denis
2001	2026	Alain Boyer

== Demography ==
The inhabitants of the commune are known as Barbisiens or Barbisiennes in French.

Historical population

Year	Pop.	±% p.a.
1793	473	—
1821	539	+0.47%
1846	588	+0.35%
1872	579	−0.06%
1901	433	−1.00%
1926	333	−1.04%
1946	298	−0.55%
1962	304	+0.12%
1968	298	−0.33%

Year	Pop.	±% p.a.
1975	276	−1.09%
1982	287	+0.56%
1990	270	−0.76%
1999	345	+2.76%
2007	402	+1.93%
2012	414	+0.59%
2017	465	+2.35%
2023	433	−1.18%

Source: EHESS and INSEE

== Sites and monuments ==
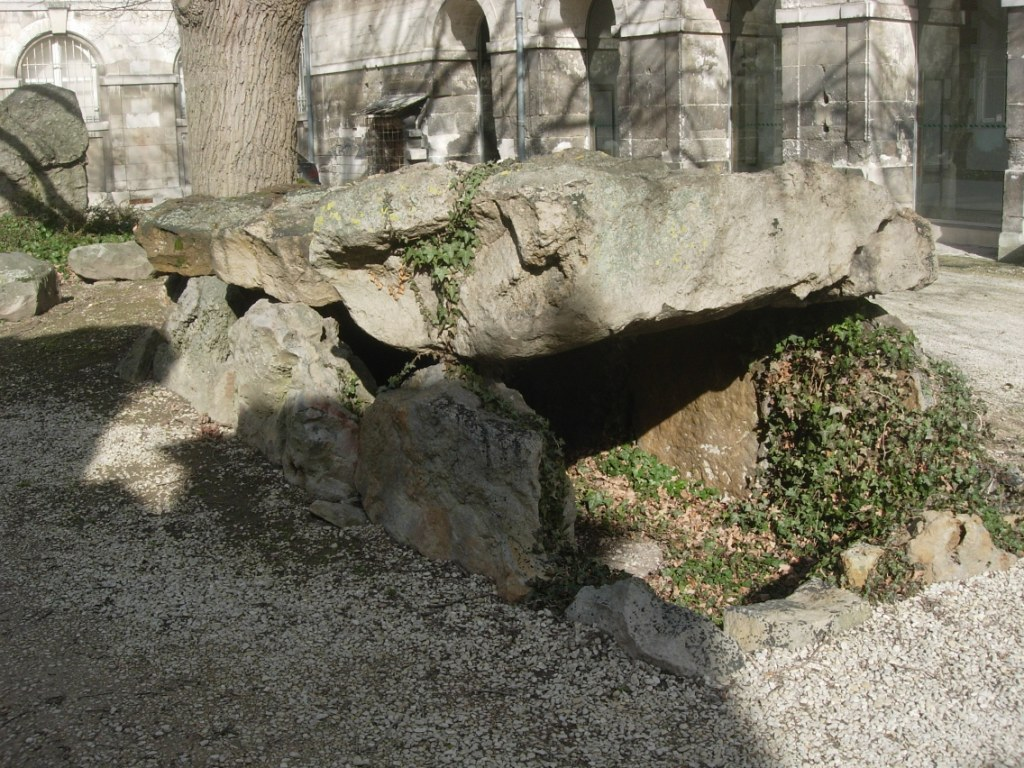
The Dolmen

- The Dolmen of Grèves de Fraicul (Neolithic) is registered as an historical monument. were a part of Cerny culture.
- The parish church dates from the 16th century and contains a large number of items that are registered as historical objects.

== See also ==
- Communes of the Aube department
