= Gumery (surname) =

Gumery is a rare surname extant in the United Kingdom, France and North America, that used to be a first name.

In England in the 18th century it was concentrated in the county of Worcestershire, and was often misspelt as Gomery or Gummery. By the time of the 1881 census of England and Wales it was still concentrated in the Midlands region, but had spread to other industrial centres in the country. In the 1881 census of England and Wales there were 47 people recorded with the surname Gumery. In 2002 there were 86 persons with the surname Gumery in England and Wales, making it the 36,388th most common surname. It comes from the two Germanic elements guma 'man' (Old English guma surviving in 'bridegroom' < brȳdeguma) and ric 'power' (Old English rīc surviving in 'bishopric'). This Germanic name still survives today in the German first name Gumarich.

In France the surname Gumery occurs most frequently in the Savoie département.

== List of people ==
- Adolphe Ernest Gumery (1861–1943), a French painter, son of Charles Alphonse Achille Gumery. See also fr:Adolphe Gumery (in French).
- Charles Alphonse Achille Gumery (1827–1871), a French sculptor whose statues L'Harmonie and La Poesie stand on top of Palais Garnier the old Opéra de Paris. See also fr:Charles Gumery (in French).
- George Gumery (1887–1912) an engineer's mess steward from Birmingham, England who went down with the Titanic.
