= Saint-Nicolas-la-Chapelle =

Saint-Nicolas-la-Chapelle may refer to the following places in France:

- Saint-Nicolas-la-Chapelle, Aube, in the Aube département
- Saint-Nicolas-la-Chapelle, Savoie, in the Savoie département
