= Gomory =

Gomory may refer to:

- Ralph E. Gomory, researcher and mathematician
  - Gomory's theorem, so named for the mathematician
- Gremory, a demon sometimes written as Gomory

== See also ==
- Gomery
