= Gummery =

Gummery is a relatively rare surname extant mainly in the United Kingdom, North America and Australia.

In England in the 18th century it was concentrated in the county of Worcestershire and is a misspelling of Gomery or Gumery. By the time of the 1881 census of England and Wales it was still concentrated in the Midlands region, but had spread to other industrial centres in the country . In the 1881 census of England and Wales there were 98 people recorded with the surname Gummery. In 2002 there were 242 persons with the surname Gummery in England and Wales, making it the 18,859th most common surname.

== People with the surname Gummery ==
- Henry Gummery (1832–1912) a British Victorian artist of still life and landscape art.
- Edward, Elizabeth and Ann Gummery a family who were murdered in Berrow, Worcestershire, England in 1780, together with Elizabeth's brother, Thomas Sheen. The murderer and the reason for their murder has never been discovered, but it may have been linked to the enclosure of common land in the area for private use.
- Walter Gummery (1900–1974), English footballer

== As a place name ==
- Gummery's Alley, Dorset Street, Marylebone, London is mentioned in "Boyle's 'View of London, and its Environs'" published in 1799.
- Gummery Street located in the suburb of Bedford, in the City of Bayswater, northeast of Perth, Western Australia.
