= Château de La Motte-Tilly =

Castle in Grand Est, France

Coordinates: 48.4671°N 3.4315°E

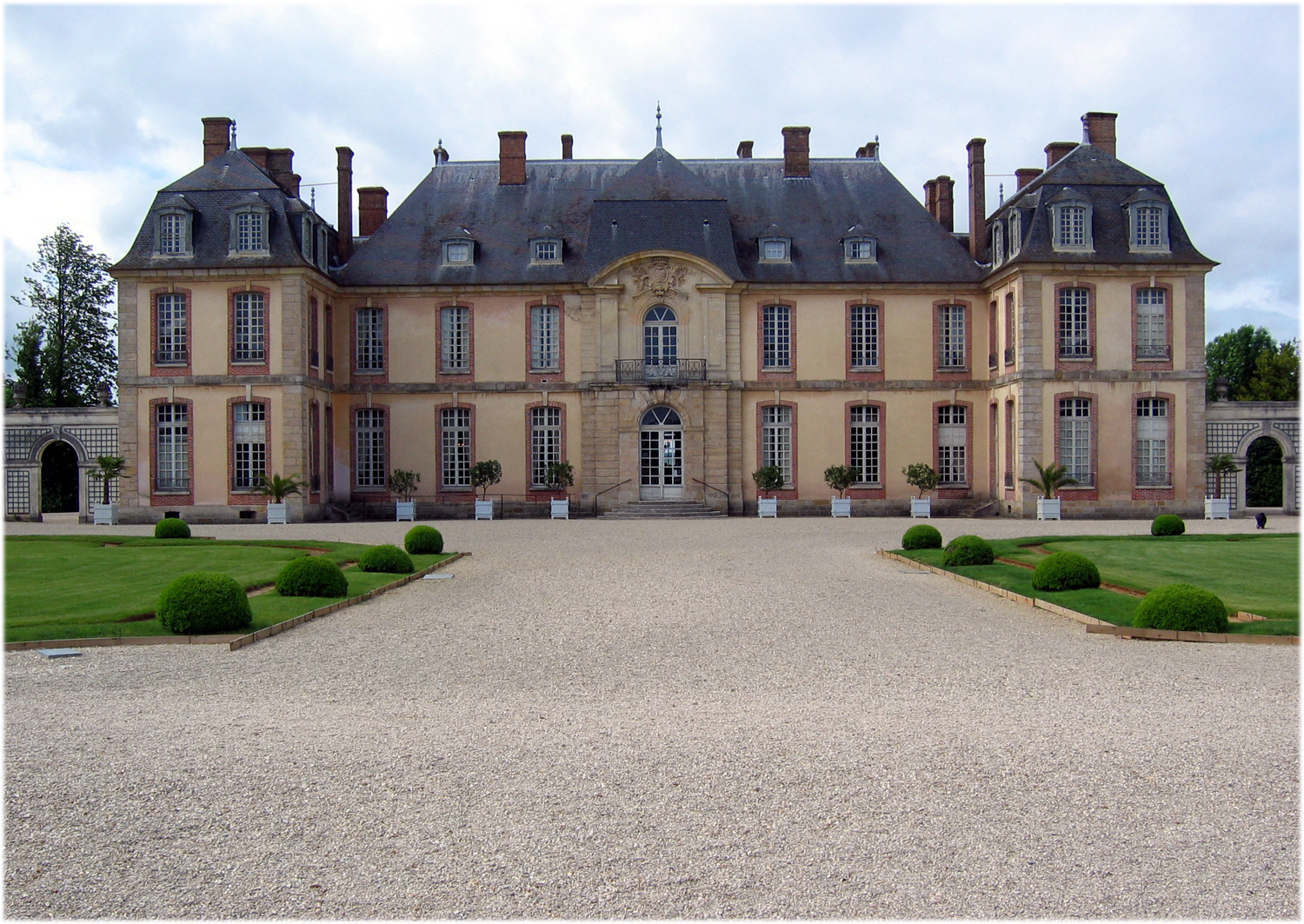
Château de La Motte-Tilly

Location of Château de La Motte-Tilly in Grand Est

Château de La Motte-Tilly is a castle in the commune of La Motte-Tilly, 7 kilometres (4 mi) south-west of Nogent-sur-Seine, Aube, France. It is on the left bank of the Seine and has been open to the public since 1978. The château is managed by the Centre des monuments nationaux.

The old castle, was first recorded in 1369. It was surrounded by a moat (which is still visible) and belonged to the lords of Trainel, then to the Raguier family, followed by the Elbeyne and Bournonville families. Finally in 1710 Louis XIV gave it to Marshal Duke Adrien Maurice de Noailles. The old castle was demolished and a new manor house was built in 1755 according to a design by the architect François-Nicolas Lancret. The new structure was intended to be a hunting lodge.
