= Périgny-la-Rose =

Commune in Grand Est, France

- Commune
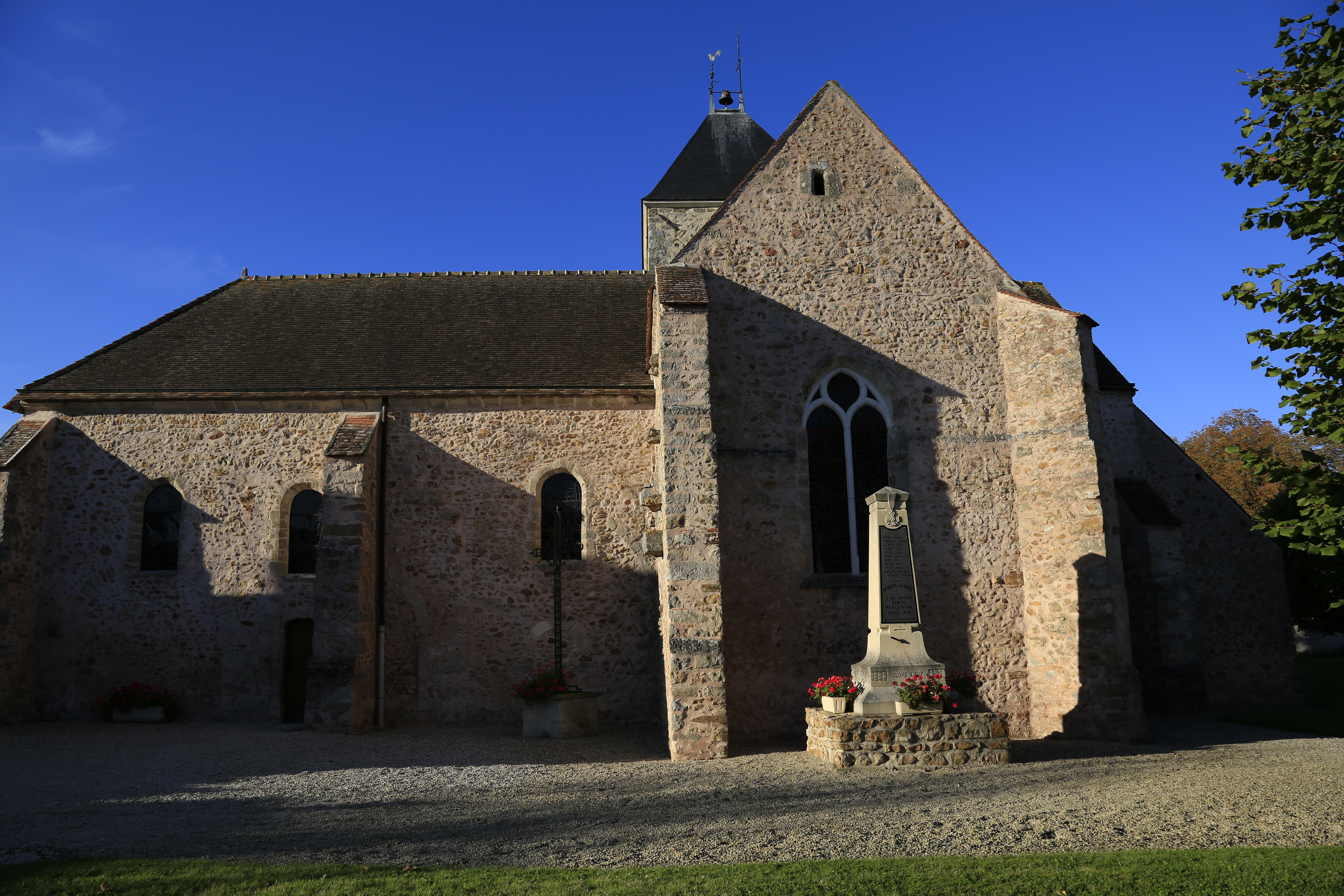
- The church in Périgny-la-Rose
- Location of Périgny-la-Rose
- Location within France Location within Grand Est
- Coordinates: 48°33′01″N 3°37′35″E
- Country: France
- Region: Grand Est
- Department: Aube
- Arrondissement: Nogent-sur-Seine
- Canton: Nogent-sur-Seine
- Intercommunality: Nogentais

Government
  - Mayor (2020–2026): Guy Dollat
- Area^{1}: 6.86 km^{2} (2.65 sq mi)
- Elevation: 71 m (233 ft)
- Population (2023): 154
  - Density: 22.4/km^{2} (58.1/sq mi)
- Time zone: UTC+01:00 (CET)
  - Summer (DST): UTC+02:00 (CEST)
- INSEE/Postal code: 10284 /10400
- ^{1} French Land Register data, which excludes lakes, ponds, glaciers > 1 km^{2} (0.386 sq mi or 247 acres) and river estuaries.

Périgny-la-Rose (French pronunciation: [peʁiɲi la ʁoz]) is a commune in the Aube department in north-central France.

== Population ==
Historical population
Year	Pop.	±% p.a.
1968	100	—
1975	77	−3.66%
1982	93	+2.73%
1990	107	+1.77%
1999	115	+0.80%
2007	105	−1.13%
2012	123	+3.22%
2017	140	+2.62%
2023	154	+1.60%
Source: INSEE

== See also ==
- Communes of the Aube department
- List of medieval bridges in France
