= La Motte-Tilly =

Commune in Grand Est, France

- Commune
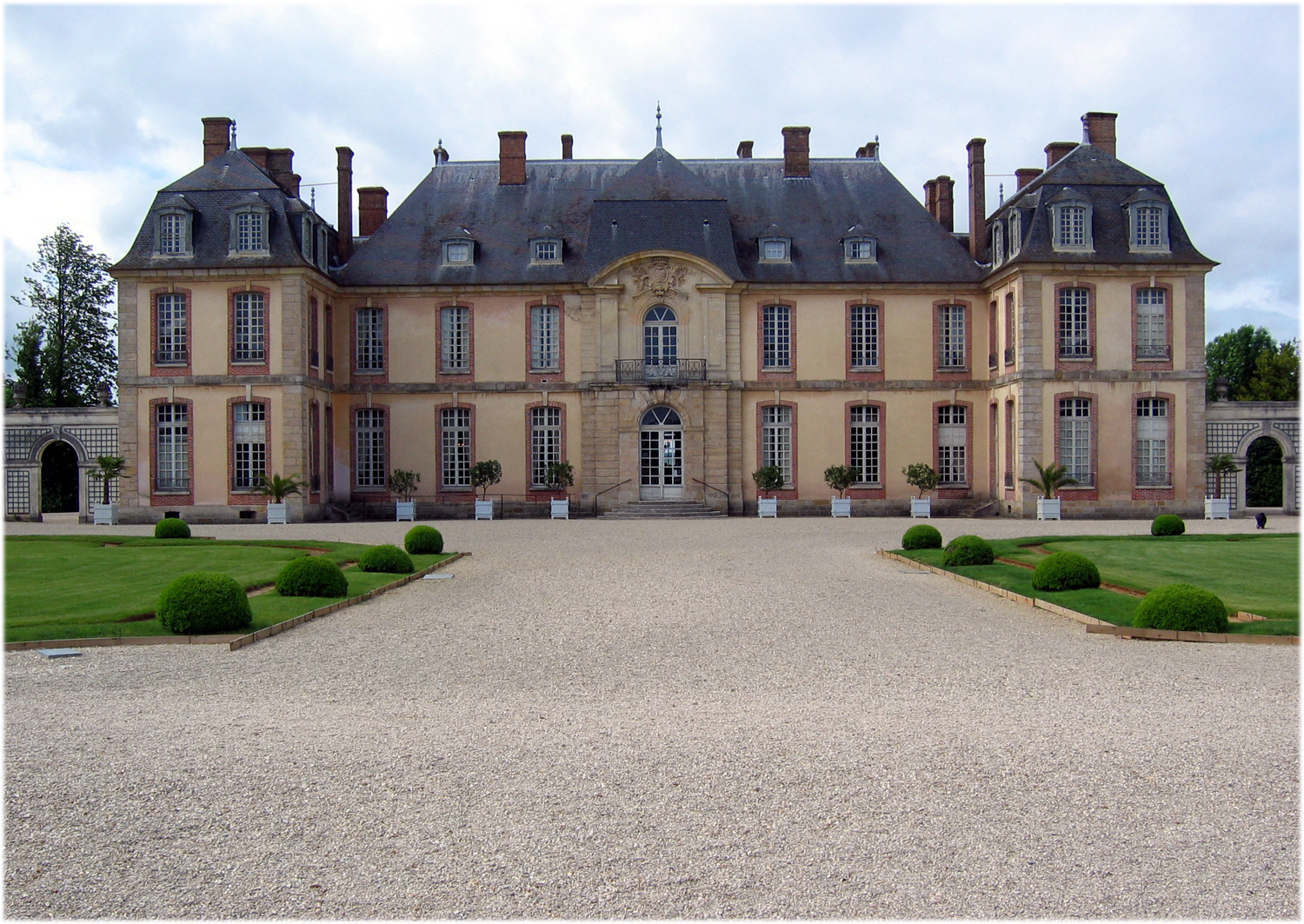
- Château de La Motte-Tilly
- Location of La Motte-Tilly
- Location within France Location within Grand Est
- Coordinates: 48°28′28″N 3°26′16″E
- Country: France
- Region: Grand Est
- Department: Aube
- Arrondissement: Nogent-sur-Seine
- Canton: Nogent-sur-Seine
- Intercommunality: CC du Nogentais

Government
  - Mayor (2020–2026): Olivier Doussot
- Area^{1}: 11.59 km^{2} (4.47 sq mi)
- Elevation: 61 m (200 ft)
- Population (2023): 373
  - Density: 32.2/km^{2} (83.4/sq mi)
- Demonym: Mottois
- Time zone: UTC+01:00 (CET)
  - Summer (DST): UTC+02:00 (CEST)
- INSEE/Postal code: 10259 /10400
- Website: www.lamottetilly.fr
- ^{1} French Land Register data, which excludes lakes, ponds, glaciers > 1 km^{2} (0.386 sq mi or 247 acres) and river estuaries.

La Motte-Tilly (French pronunciation: [la mɔttiji]) is a rural commune in the Aube department in north-central France. The Château de La Motte-Tilly is situated in the commune.

== Population ==
Historical population
Year	Pop.	±% p.a.
1968	251	—
1975	254	+0.17%
1982	275	+1.14%
1990	330	+2.31%
1999	327	−0.10%
2007	361	+1.24%
2012	399	+2.02%
2017	372	−1.39%
2023	373	+0.04%
Source: INSEE

== See also ==
- Communes of the Aube department
