= Courceroy =

Commune in Grand Est, France

- Commune
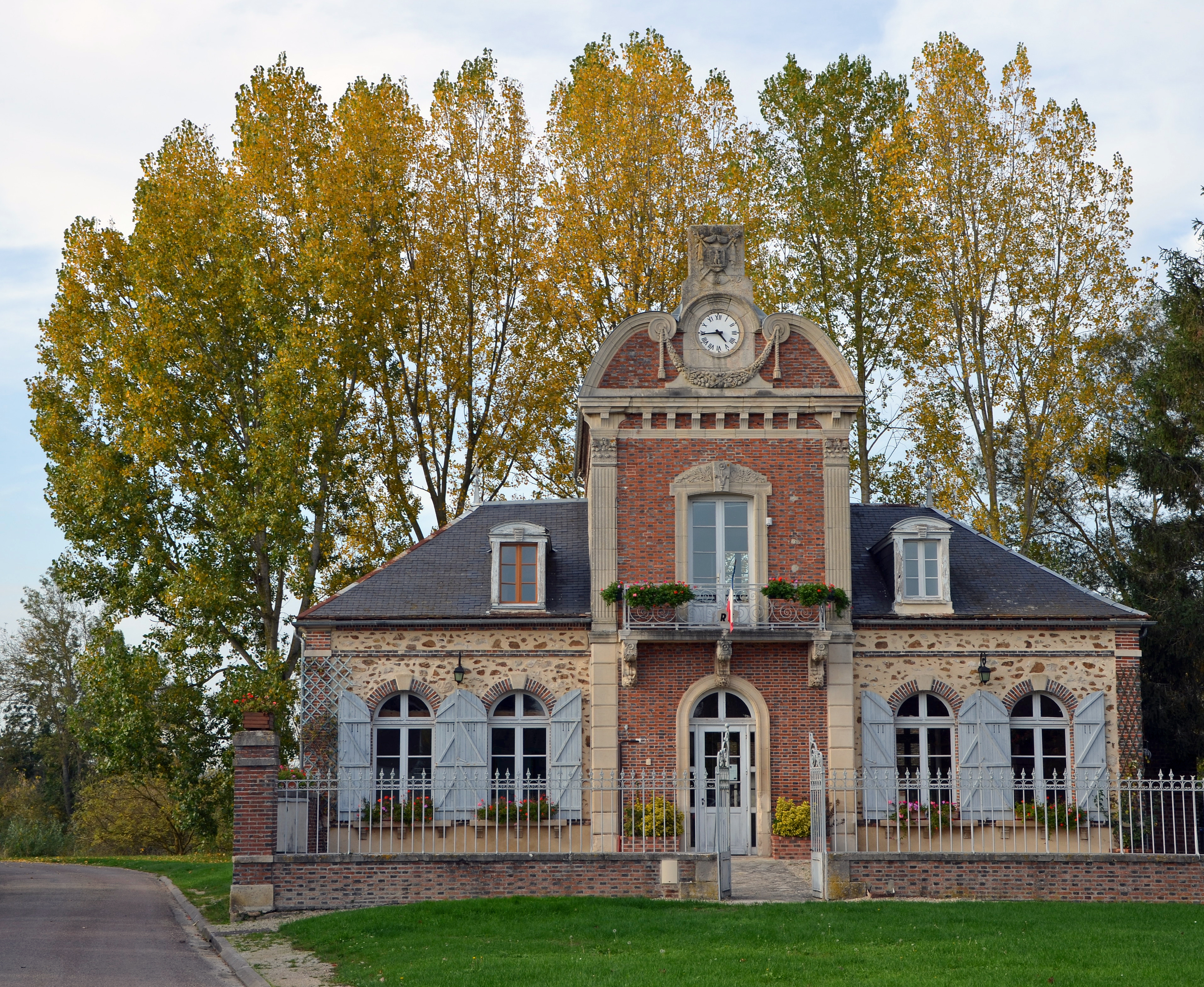
- Town hall
- Location of Courceroy
- Location within France Location within Grand Est
- Coordinates: 48°27′55″N 3°24′52″E
- Country: France
- Region: Grand Est
- Department: Aube
- Arrondissement: Nogent-sur-Seine
- Canton: Nogent-sur-Seine
- Intercommunality: Nogentais

Government
  - Mayor (2020–2026): Xavier Masson
- Area^{1}: 6.69 km^{2} (2.58 sq mi)
- Elevation: 60 m (200 ft)
- Population (2023): 150
  - Density: 22/km^{2} (58/sq mi)
- Time zone: UTC+01:00 (CET)
  - Summer (DST): UTC+02:00 (CEST)
- INSEE/Postal code: 10106 /10400
- ^{1} French Land Register data, which excludes lakes, ponds, glaciers > 1 km^{2} (0.386 sq mi or 247 acres) and river estuaries.

Courceroy (French pronunciation: [kuʁsəʁwa]) is a commune in the Aube department in north-central France.

== Population ==
Historical population
Year	Pop.	±% p.a.
1968	78	—
1975	71	−1.33%
1982	92	+3.77%
1990	103	+1.42%
1999	100	−0.33%
2007	103	+0.37%
2012	121	+3.27%
2017	127	+0.97%
2023	150	+2.81%
Source: INSEE

== See also ==
- Communes of the Aube department
