= Saint-Aubin, Aube =

Commune in Grand Est, France

Saint-Aubin
- Commune
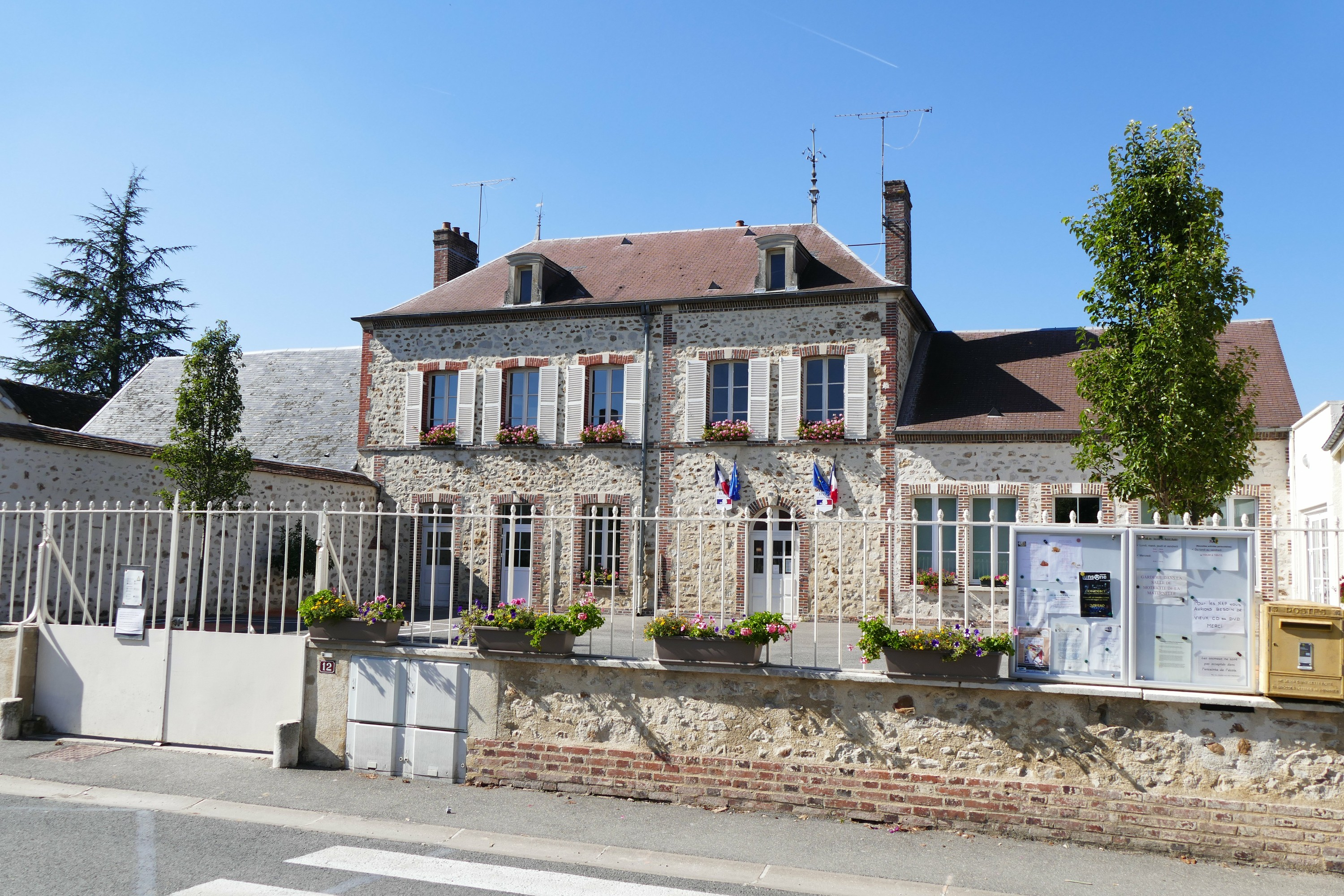
- The town hall in Saint-Aubin
- Location of Saint-Aubin
- Location within France Location within Grand Est
- Coordinates: 48°28′37″N 3°33′33″E
- Country: France
- Region: Grand Est
- Department: Aube
- Arrondissement: Nogent-sur-Seine
- Canton: Nogent-sur-Seine
- Intercommunality: Nogentais

Government
  - Mayor (2020–2026): Vincent Barat
- Area^{1}: 17.76 km^{2} (6.86 sq mi)
- Elevation: 75 m (246 ft)
- Population (2023): 580
  - Density: 33/km^{2} (85/sq mi)
- Time zone: UTC+01:00 (CET)
  - Summer (DST): UTC+02:00 (CEST)
- INSEE/Postal code: 10334 /10400
- ^{1} French Land Register data, which excludes lakes, ponds, glaciers > 1 km^{2} (0.386 sq mi or 247 acres) and river estuaries.

Saint-Aubin (French pronunciation: [sɛ̃.t‿obɛ̃]) is a commune in the Aube department in north-central France.

== History ==
The name Saint-Aubin comes from that of the church Sanctus Albinus, already in existence in the 12th century.

The village depended on the Abbey of the Paraclete founded by Peter Abelard around 1121 and established as a nunnery by Héloïse around 1125, 1 km southeast of the village. The curacy of Saint-Aubin was assigned by the abbess of Le Paraclet. The conventual building, the old vaulted kitchen, the barns and the dovecote remain and are listed monuments.

A 1271 deed of partition mentions a fortified house at Saint-Aubin: "seigneury with keep, fossez and arrière-fossez". In 1603, a survey located the motte and its outbuildings on an area of "two and a half arpents 10 perches" between the cemetery, rue du Cormont, Grande rue and the "pré et aulnoy" where the river Ardusson runs.

== Château de La Chapelle-Godefroy ==
Château de La Chapelle-Godefroy, 2.8 km northwest of the village, was acquired in 1697 by Jean Orry, who had it almost entirely rebuilt in 1706, at considerable expense, by the architect Jacques de Lajoue. Today's Tourne-Bride, on the north side of the D4422, corresponds to a former roadside outbuilding of the château, where servants and visitors' horses would disembark.

His son Philibert Orry, Master of Requests for Louis XIV, inherited the château in 1719. In 1730, he was appointed Controller-General of Finances and in the same year commissioned Charles-Joseph Natoire to paint a famous group of 21 canvases for the chateau, created between 1731 and 1740. He also owned two paintings by Antoine Watteau (L'Enchanteur and L'Aventurière). Eventually, the château's collections also included a Robert (Ruines d'un pont romain); a Boucher (Les Génies des Beaux-Arts); and works by lesser-known artists such as Claude François Desportes, son of Alexandre-François Desportes, (who offers the only known view of the château grounds), Michelangelo Cerquozzi, and Antoine Coypel.

Louis XV slept at the château on 12 November 1744, on his return from Metz.

After Philibert Orry's death in 1747, the château passed to his brother Jean Henri Louis Orry de Fulvy (1703-1751), then to the latter's son, Philibert Louis Orry de Fulvy, who sold it in 1760 to Bouret de Valroche (brother of fermier général Bouret). The following year, he sold it to Jean de Boullonges (†1769), who bequeathed it to his son, Jean-Nicolas de Boullongne (†1787). The latter's son, Paul Esprit Charles de Boullongne, saw the château seized in 1792. During the winter of 1792, citoyen Lassertey, administrator of the Aube department, was commissioned to select works for the future Musée de Troyes10, which thus acquired a unique collection of Natoire's paintings.

During the French Revolution, the commune was temporarily named Corquelin. A chapel of this name is shown to the west of the village on the Cassini map.

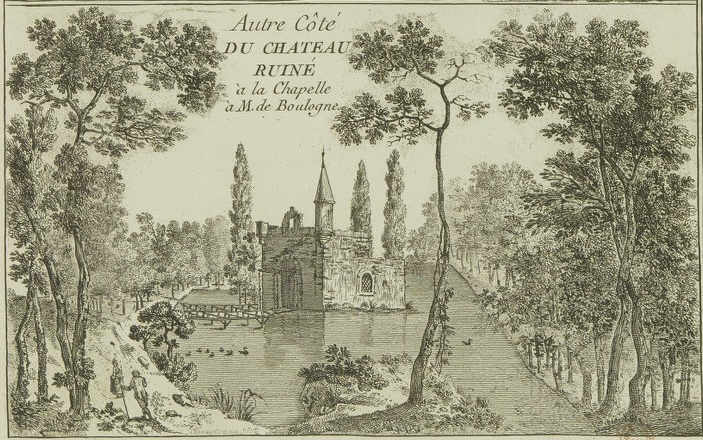
Château la Chapelle-Godefroy ruins

The château was pillaged and burnt down in 1814 during the battle of Nogent-sur-Seine. A few vestiges remain: pavilion, entrance gate, ruins in the former park.

According to the Aube archives, in death certificates from 1825 to 1862 (p. 185/219), Château de La Chapelle-Godefroy was inhabited by Madame Gabrielle Legras de Vaubercey, who died there on 2 May 1857, and her husband Adolphe Henri du Hamel.

== Meteors ==
In 1968, a 170 kg meteorite fragment was discovered by farmers. On 3 October 2018 another fragment was discovered. This one weighs no less than 477 kg, making it the largest meteorite ever found in France. What's more, with a total of 7 tonnes of rock of extraterrestrial origin unearthed by researchers, this is the largest collection of celestial objects of this type ever uncovered in France. These meteorites had been lying one metre underground for 55,000 years.

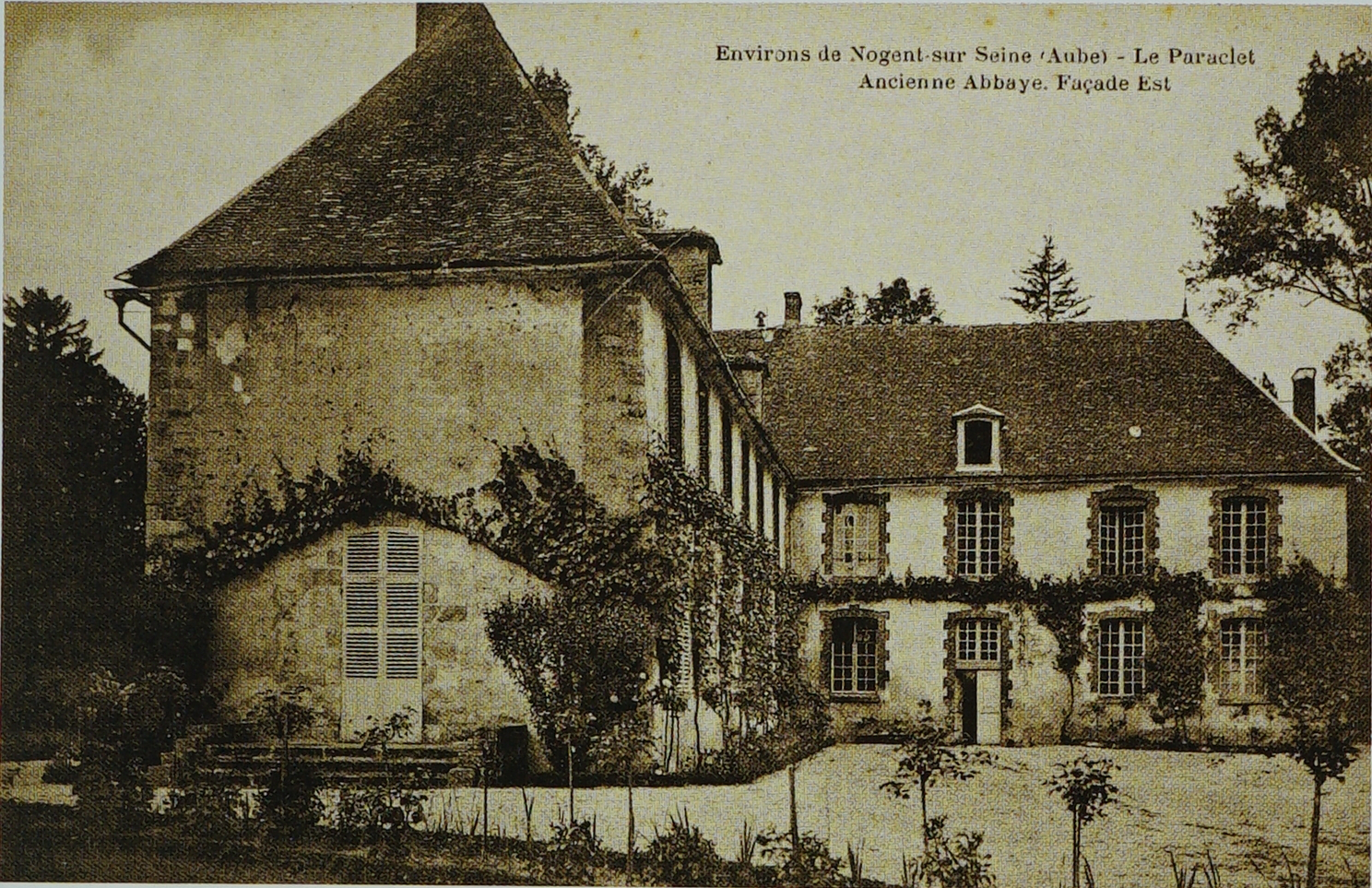
Abbey of the Paraclete

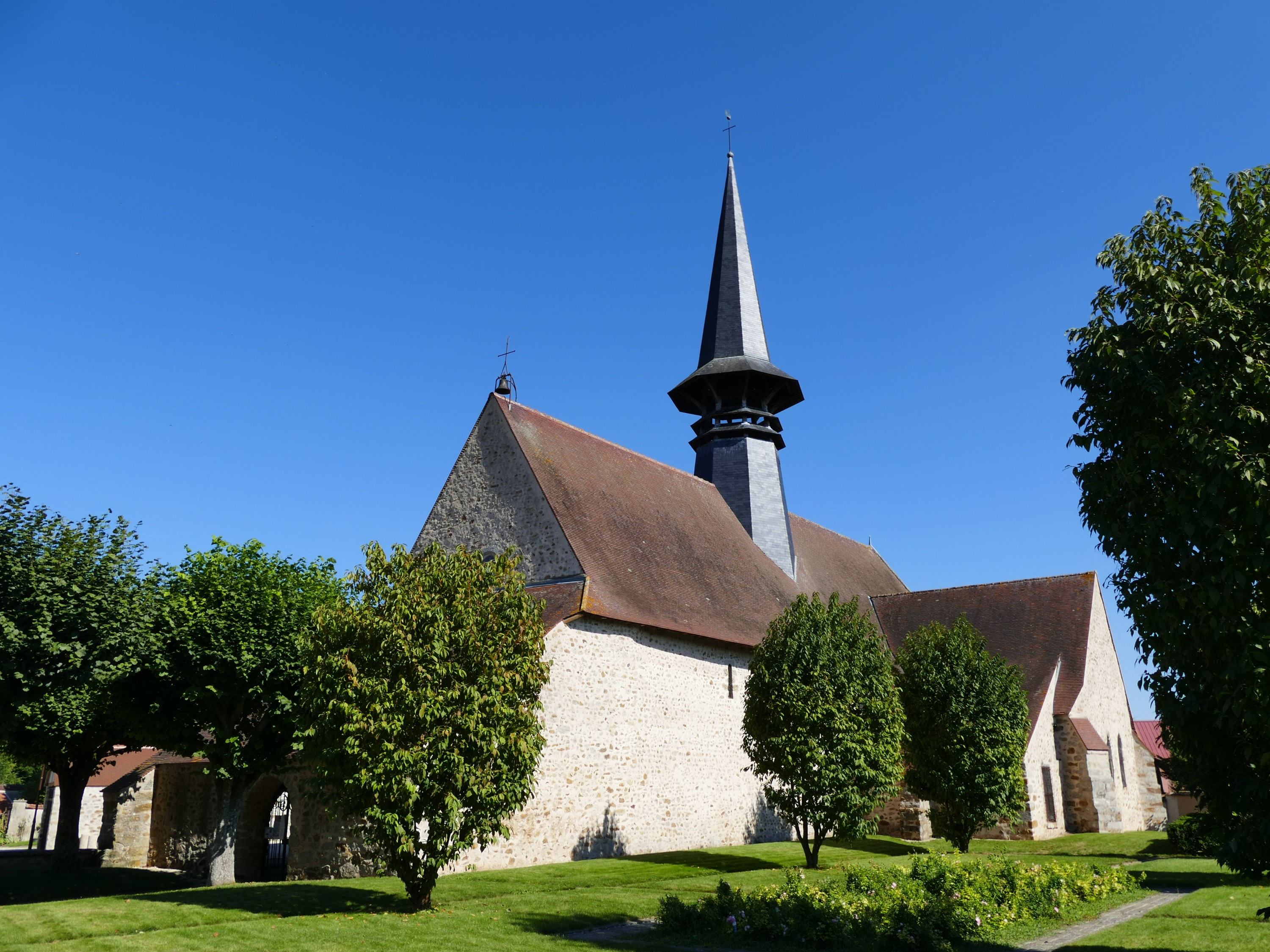
Église Saint-Aubin

== Population ==
Historical population
Year	Pop.	±% p.a.
1968	320	—
1975	348	+1.21%
1982	349	+0.04%
1990	505	+4.73%
1999	537	+0.68%
2007	561	+0.55%
2012	590	+1.01%
2017	588	−0.07%
2023	580	−0.23%
Source: INSEE

== See also ==
- Communes of the Aube department
