= Fontenay-de-Bossery =

Commune in Grand Est, France

- Commune
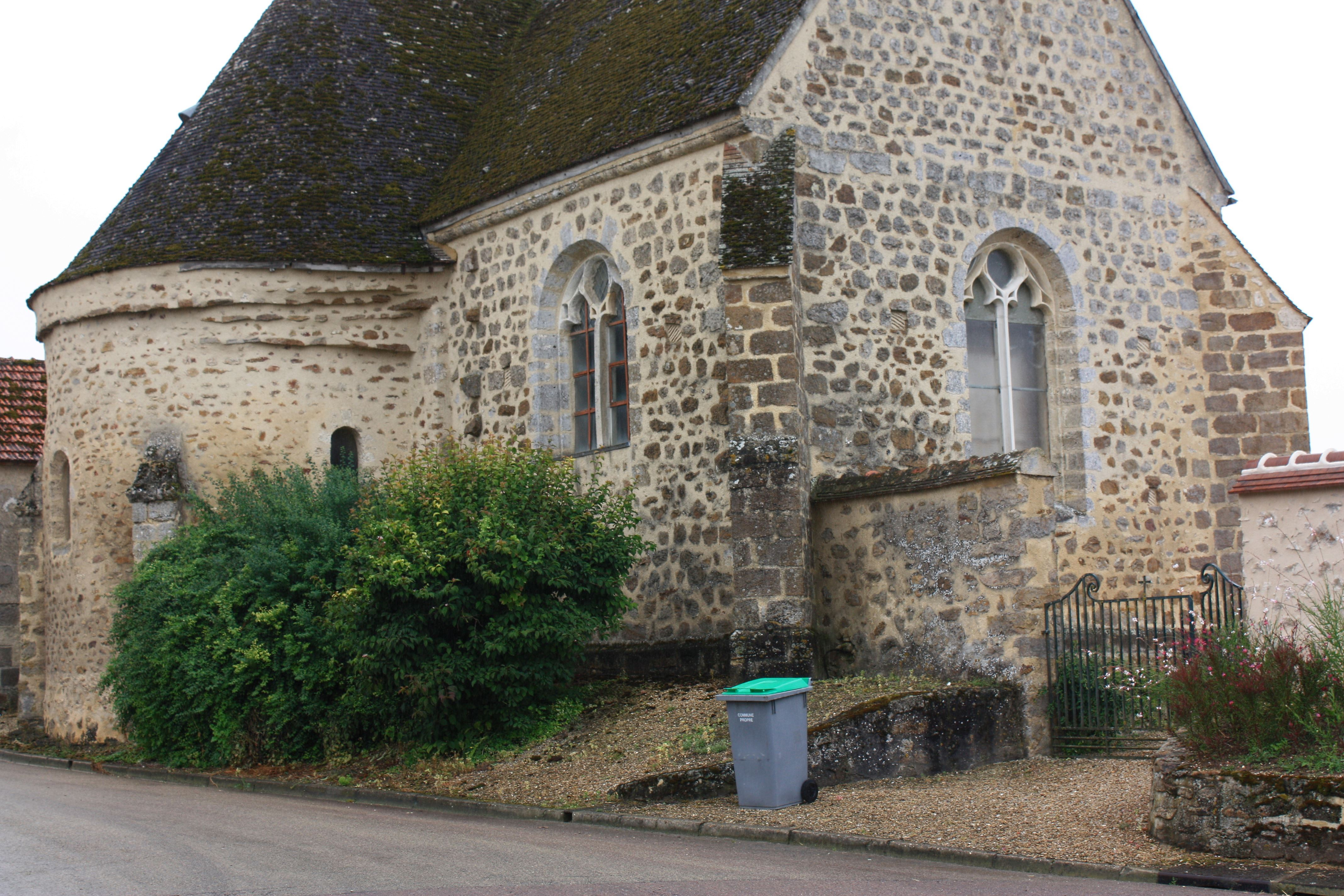
- The church in Fontenay-de-Bossery
- Location of Fontenay-de-Bossery
- Location within France Location within Grand Est
- Coordinates: 48°27′15″N 3°27′25″E
- Country: France
- Region: Grand Est
- Department: Aube
- Arrondissement: Nogent-sur-Seine
- Canton: Nogent-sur-Seine
- Intercommunality: Nogentais

Government
  - Mayor (2020–2026): Jacques Vajou
- Area^{1}: 8.4 km^{2} (3.2 sq mi)
- Elevation: 72 m (236 ft)
- Population (2023): 70
  - Density: 8.3/km^{2} (22/sq mi)
- Time zone: UTC+01:00 (CET)
  - Summer (DST): UTC+02:00 (CEST)
- INSEE/Postal code: 10154 /10400
- ^{1} French Land Register data, which excludes lakes, ponds, glaciers > 1 km^{2} (0.386 sq mi or 247 acres) and river estuaries.

Fontenay-de-Bossery (French pronunciation: [fɔ̃tnɛ də bɔsʁi]) is a commune in the Aube department in north-central France.

== Population ==
Historical population
Year	Pop.	±% p.a.
1968	88	—
1975	77	−1.89%
1982	75	−0.38%
1990	81	+0.97%
1999	78	−0.42%
2007	81	+0.47%
2012	77	−1.01%
2017	72	−1.33%
2023	70	−0.47%
Source: INSEE

== See also ==
- Communes of the Aube department
