= La Saulsotte =

Commune in Grand Est, France

- Commune
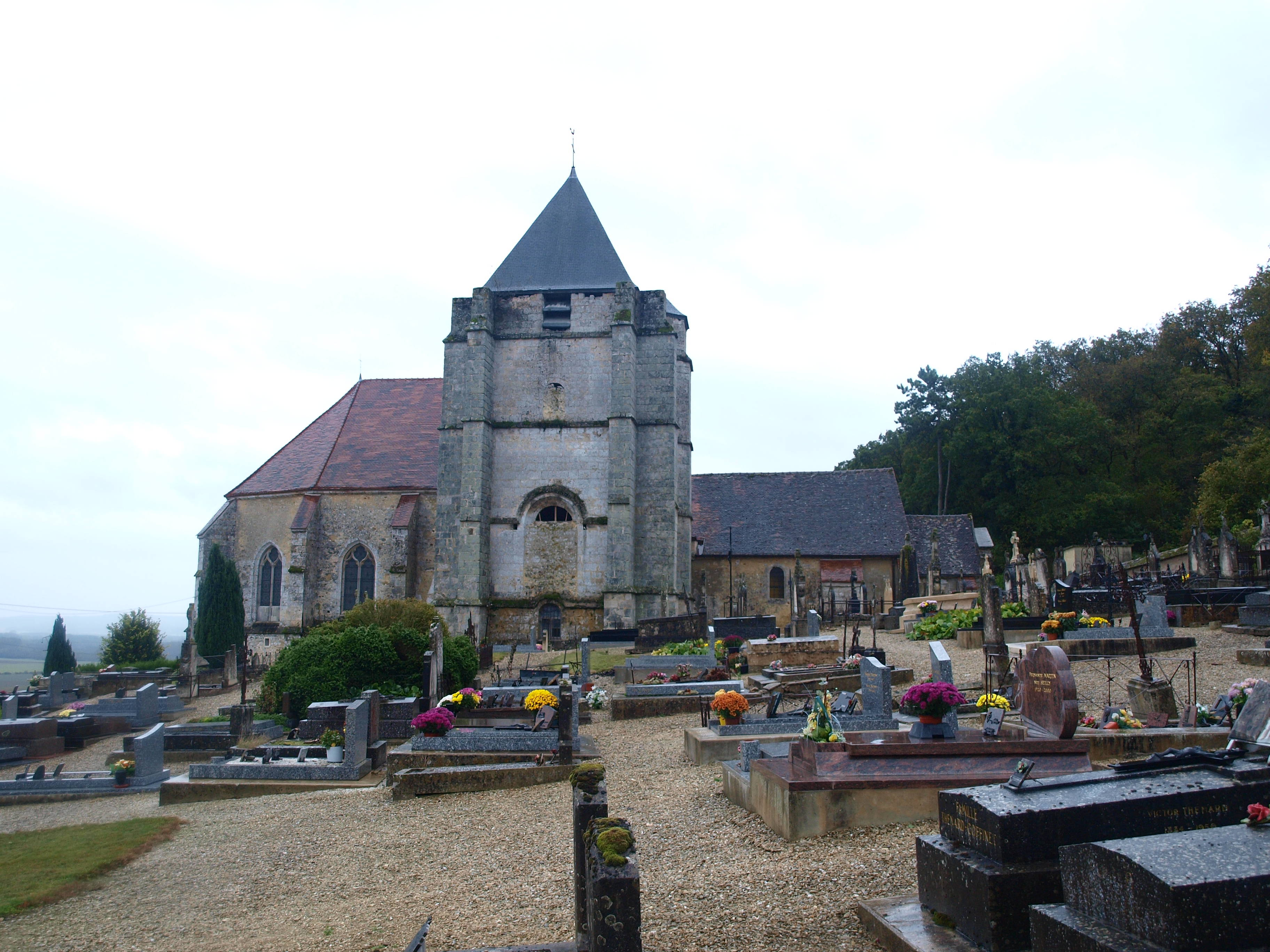
- The church in La Saulsotte
- Location of La Saulsotte
- Location within France Location within Grand Est
- Coordinates: 48°32′36″N 3°30′09″E
- Country: France
- Region: Grand Est
- Department: Aube
- Arrondissement: Nogent-sur-Seine
- Canton: Nogent-sur-Seine
- Intercommunality: Nogentais

Government
  - Mayor (2020–2026): Gérard Delorme
- Area^{1}: 18.93 km^{2} (7.31 sq mi)
- Elevation: 86 m (282 ft)
- Population (2023): 677
  - Density: 35.8/km^{2} (92.6/sq mi)
- Time zone: UTC+01:00 (CET)
  - Summer (DST): UTC+02:00 (CEST)
- INSEE/Postal code: 10367 /10400
- ^{1} French Land Register data, which excludes lakes, ponds, glaciers > 1 km^{2} (0.386 sq mi or 247 acres) and river estuaries.

La Saulsotte (French pronunciation: [la solsɔt]) is a commune in the Aube department in north-central France.

== Population ==
Historical population
Year	Pop.	±% p.a.
1968	306	—
1975	311	+0.23%
1982	334	+1.02%
1990	348	+0.51%
1999	491	+3.90%
2007	591	+2.34%
2012	691	+3.18%
2017	704	+0.37%
2023	677	−0.65%
Source: INSEE

== See also ==
- Communes of the Aube department
