= Bouy-sur-Orvin =

Commune in Grand Est, France

- Commune
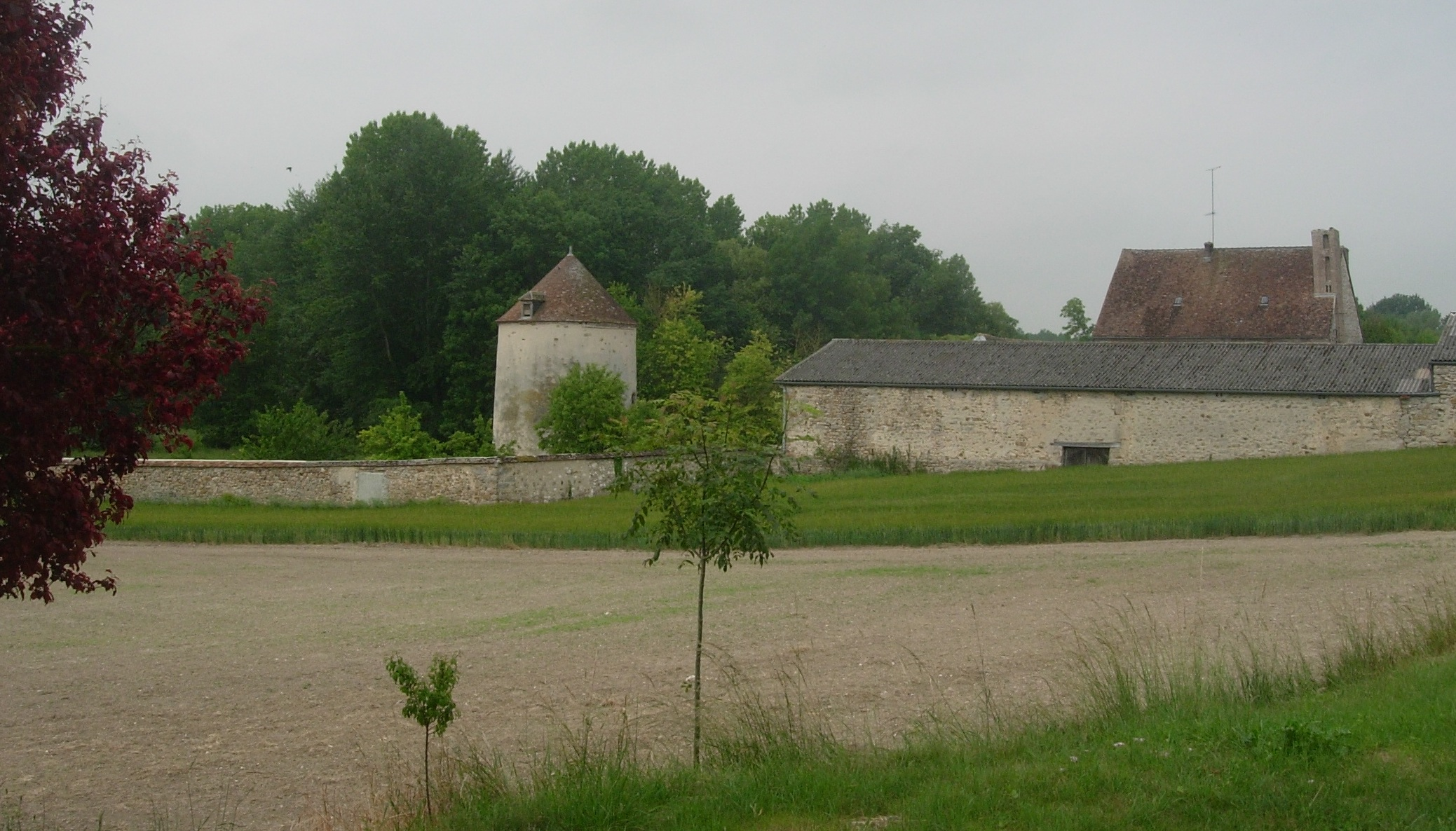
- Chateau

- Coat of arms
- Location of Bouy-sur-Orvin
- Location within France Location within Grand Est
- Coordinates: 48°24′48″N 3°29′57″E
- Country: France
- Region: Grand Est
- Department: Aube
- Arrondissement: Nogent-sur-Seine
- Canton: Nogent-sur-Seine
- Intercommunality: Nogentais

Government
  - Mayor (2020–2026): Michel Jerome
- Area^{1}: 6.7 km^{2} (2.6 sq mi)
- Elevation: 90 m (300 ft)
- Population (2023): 57
  - Density: 8.5/km^{2} (22/sq mi)
- Time zone: UTC+01:00 (CET)
  - Summer (DST): UTC+02:00 (CEST)
- INSEE/Postal code: 10057 /10400
- ^{1} French Land Register data, which excludes lakes, ponds, glaciers > 1 km^{2} (0.386 sq mi or 247 acres) and river estuaries.

Bouy-sur-Orvin (French pronunciation: [bwi syʁ ɔʁvɛ̃]) is a commune in the Aube department in north-central France.

== Population ==
Historical population
Year	Pop.	±% p.a.
1968	92	—
1975	73	−3.25%
1982	64	−1.86%
1990	56	−1.66%
1999	56	+0.00%
2007	66	+2.08%
2012	57	−2.89%
2017	56	−0.35%
2023	57	+0.30%
Source: INSEE

== See also ==
- Communes of the Aube department
