= Jeanne Natoire =

French artist (c. 1700–1776)

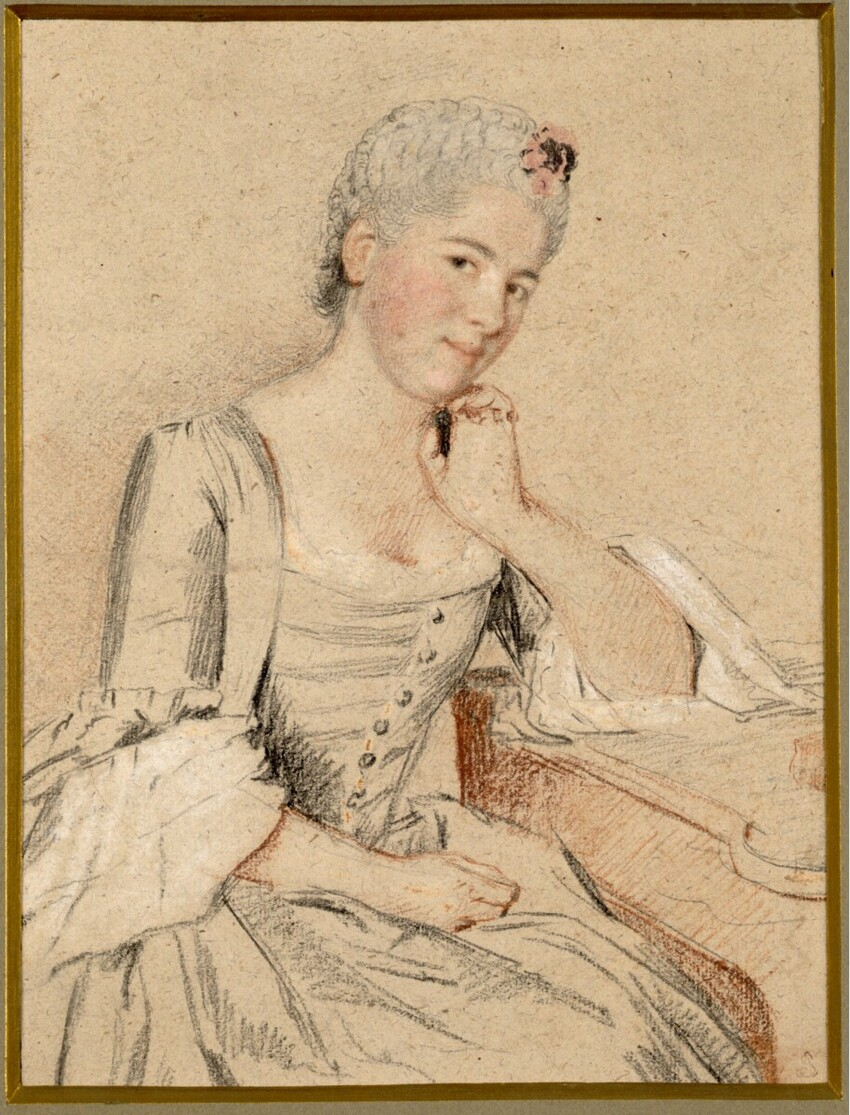
A 1750 portrait of Jeanne Natoire made by her brother, Charles-Joseph Natoire.

Jeanne Natoire (c. 1700 – 1776) was a French pastellist.

Born in Nîmes, Natoire was the sister of painter Charles-Joseph Natoire. She lived with him throughout her life; when he traveled to Rome in 1751 to become director of the French Academy in that city, she followed him there. She produced many copies of the work of other artists.

Among these were eight copies of work by Jean François de Troy and Rosalba Carriera held in the collection of the Julienne family. Natoire's brother attempted to secure a pension for her in 1756. She is said to be the subject of a portrait drawing by Jean-Étienne Liotard currently in the collection of the Albertina.
