= Le Mériot =

Commune in Grand Est, France

- Commune
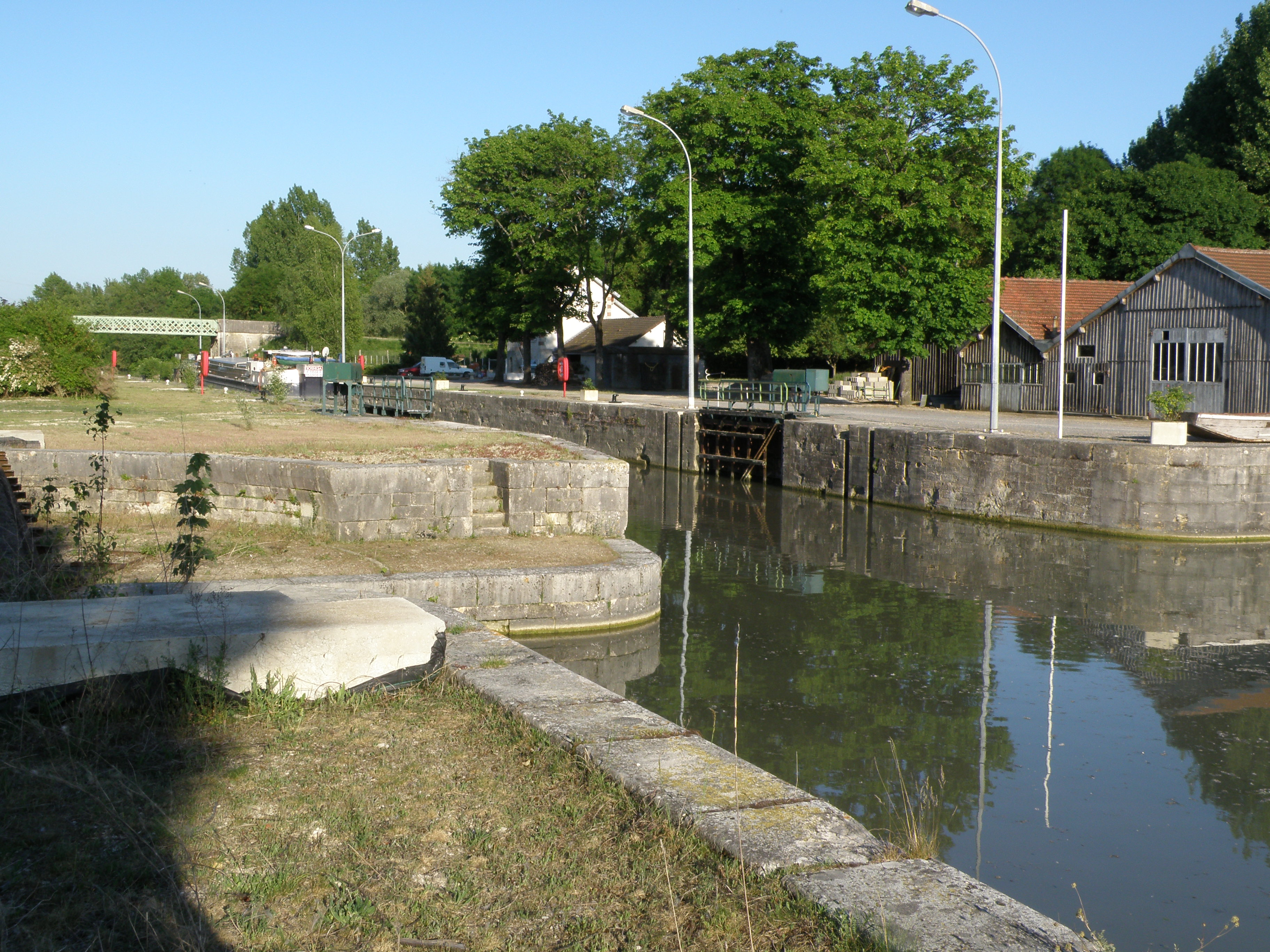
- The Beaulieu canal lock in Le Mériot
- Location of Le Mériot
- Location within France Location within Grand Est
- Coordinates: 48°30′23″N 3°26′25″E
- Country: France
- Region: Grand Est
- Department: Aube
- Arrondissement: Nogent-sur-Seine
- Canton: Nogent-sur-Seine
- Intercommunality: Nogentais

Government
  - Mayor (2023–2026): Lydie Huguenot
- Area^{1}: 12.6 km^{2} (4.9 sq mi)
- Elevation: 63 m (207 ft)
- Population (2023): 611
  - Density: 48.5/km^{2} (126/sq mi)
- Time zone: UTC+01:00 (CET)
  - Summer (DST): UTC+02:00 (CEST)
- INSEE/Postal code: 10231 /10400
- ^{1} French Land Register data, which excludes lakes, ponds, glaciers > 1 km^{2} (0.386 sq mi or 247 acres) and river estuaries.

Le Mériot (French pronunciation: [lə meʁjo]) is a commune in the Aube department in north-central France.

== Population ==
Historical population
Year	Pop.	±% p.a.
1968	325	—
1975	339	+0.60%
1982	356	+0.70%
1990	417	+2.00%
1999	495	+1.92%
2007	558	+1.51%
2012	589	+1.09%
2017	614	+0.83%
2023	611	−0.08%
Source: INSEE

== See also ==
- Communes of the Aube department
