= Canton of Nogent-sur-Seine =

Coordinates: 48.49°N 3.50°E

- Canton
- Situation of the canton of Nogent-sur-Seine in the department of Aube
- Country: France
- Region: Grand Est
- Department: Aube
- No. of communes: {{{nbcomm}}}
- Population (2023): 16,228
- INSEE code: 1007

The canton of Nogent-sur-Seine is an administrative division of the Aube department, northeastern France. Its borders were modified at the French canton reorganisation which came into effect in March 2015. Its seat is in Nogent-sur-Seine.

It consists of the following communes:

1. Barbuise
2. Bouy-sur-Orvin
3. Courceroy
4. Ferreux-Quincey
5. Fontaine-Mâcon
6. Fontenay-de-Bossery
7. Gumery
8. La Louptière-Thénard
9. Marnay-sur-Seine
10. Le Mériot
11. Montpothier
12. La Motte-Tilly
13. Nogent-sur-Seine
14. Périgny-la-Rose
15. Plessis-Barbuise
16. Pont-sur-Seine
17. Saint-Aubin
18. Saint-Nicolas-la-Chapelle
19. La Saulsotte
20. Soligny-les-Étangs
21. Traînel
22. Villenauxe-la-Grande
23. La Villeneuve-au-Châtelot
