= Philibert Orry =

French politician (1689–1747)

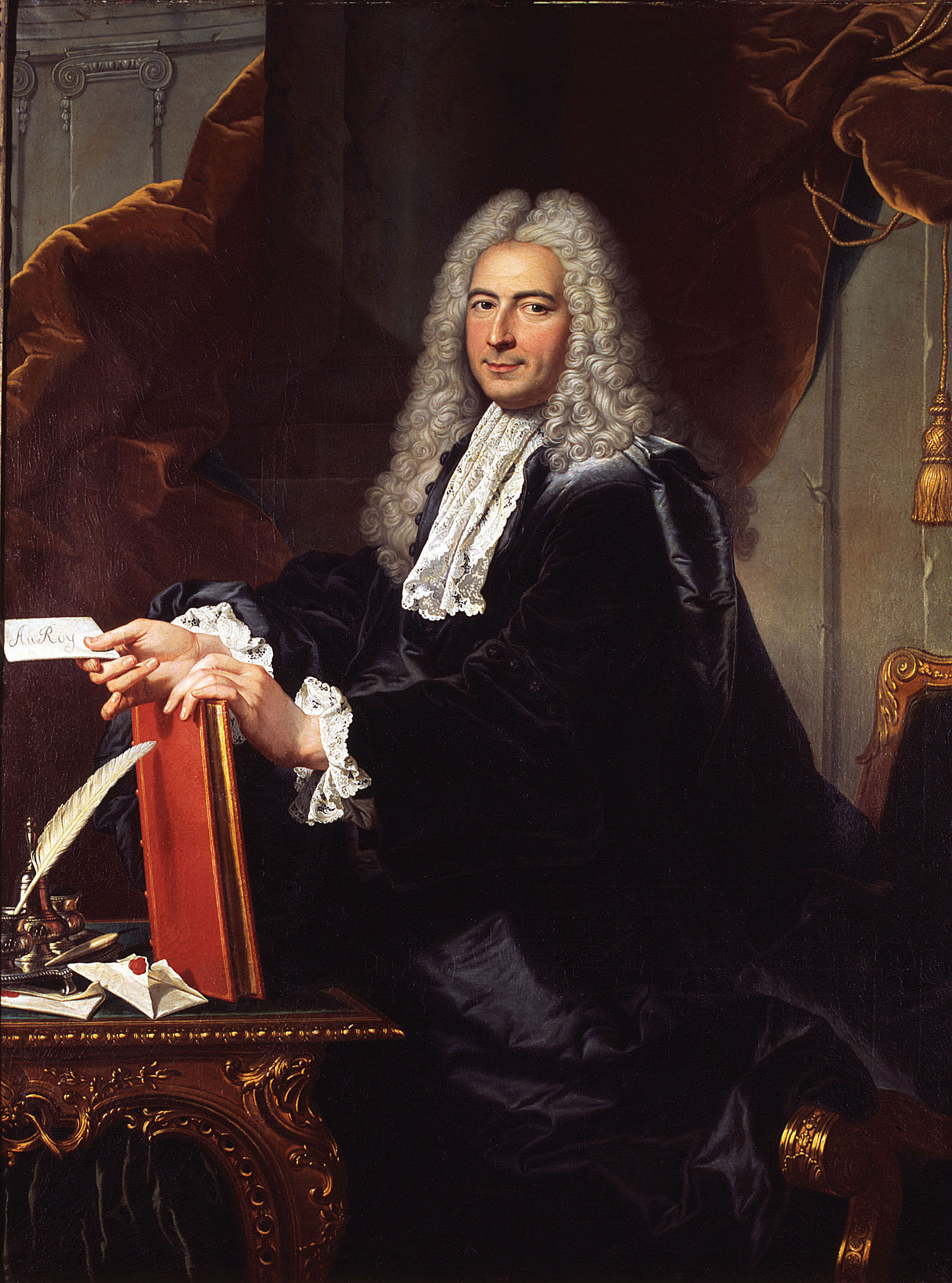
Philibert Orry, by Hyacinthe Rigaud.

Philibert Orry, Count of Vignory and Lord of La Chapelle-Godefroy (born in Troyes, Champagne (province) on 22 January 1689 – died at La Chapelle-Godefroy on 9 November 1747), was a French statesman.

== Life ==
The fifth child of Jean Orry, a leading economist, Philibert Orry served as a cavalry captain during the War of Spanish Succession, before becoming a member of the Parlement of Paris, then master of requests in 1715. He was an intendant in Lille (1715–1718), Soissons (1722–1727), and Roussillon (1727–1728).

Orry was named Controller-General of Finances in 1730 and combined this function with being director general of the Bâtiments du Roi ("the king's buildings") in 1736, after the death of the duc d'Antin. Orry remained Controller-General until 1745, making him the longest continuously serving holder of the office in the eighteenth-century.

An able economist, Orry had to restore the dixième ("tenth") tax and declared the venality of municipal officials, successfully balancing the budget in 1739–40. Applying the principles of Colbert, he sought to develop the domestic manufacture of textiles and paper, and was involved in the production of porcelain in Vincennes in 1740. He supported trade with Canada and the Indies by reforming the statutes of the Compagnie des Indes.

As director general of buildings, he established the bi-annual public Paris Salon, and became the vice-protecteur of the Académie royale de peinture et de sculpture ("Royal Academy of Painting and Sculpture") in April 1737. His directorship has, generally, been harshly judged. The marquis d'Argenson spoke with contempt of "the bad, bourgeois taste of Monsieur Orry". However, Orry's selection of Charles-Joseph Natoire in 1730 to decorate his château de La Chapelle-Godefroy (see below) reveals, on the contrary, a certain discernement in artistic matters: Natoire was one of the most promising young history painters, and his two main rivals - François Boucher and Carle Van Loo - were both abroad.

As director general of Ponts et Chaussées (bridges and highways), Orry finished the Crozat canal and maintained and developed France's road system. He sent to the intendants, in 1738, a detailed instruction on the duty (la corvée royale) for all inhabitants to spend a fortnight a year on the construction and maintenance of transport routes, classed in five categories. The corvée made France's major road network the finest in Europe, and before the Revolution, a great part of the public roads existed thanks to this institution. This policy of improved communications also led to the completion of the Cassini map in 1744.

Facing opposition from Madame de Pompadour, Orry resigned in 1745.

He was the Treasurer of the Order of the Holy Spirit from February 1743 to his death in 1747.

== Residences ==
Orry owned the château de La Chapelle-Godefroy in Saint-Aubin near Nogent-sur-Seine, inherited from his father in 1719. "M. Orry", wrote the duc de Luynes in his Mémoires, "has always appeared to have no ambition, always regretting not being able to live on his estate, near Nogent, and always ready to go there with pleasure." He transformed and expanded considerably the seigneurial estate. He owned two paintings by Jean-Antoine Watteau, the Enchanteur and the 'Aventurière, which today are in the musée des Beaux-Arts in Troyes.

Orry also possessed an estate, Petit Bercy, in Paris.
