= Charles-Joseph Natoire =

French Rococo painter (1700–1777)

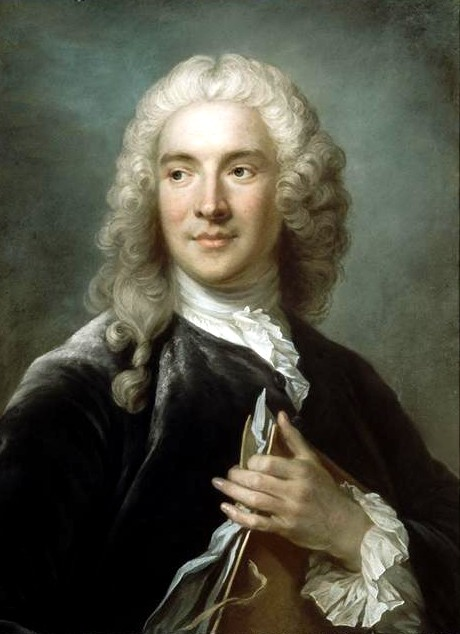
Gustaf Lundberg's portrait of Charles-Joseph Natoire (Musée du Louvre).

Charles-Joseph Natoire (3 March 1700 – 23 August 1777) was a French painter in the Rococo manner, a pupil of François Lemoyne and director of the French Academy in Rome, 1751–1775. Considered during his lifetime the equal of François Boucher, he played a prominent role in the artistic life of France.

He is remembered above all for the series of the History of Psyche for Germain Boffrand's oval salon de la Princesse in the Hôtel de Soubise, Paris, and for the tapestry cartoons for the series of the History of Don Quixote, woven at the Beauvais tapestry manufacture, most of which are present at the Château de Compiègne.

== First Roman stay (1723–1729) ==
He was born in Nîmes. His sister, Jeanne, was a pastellist.

Natoire's father Florent Natoire, a sculptor, gave him his fundamental training in drawing, then sent him to Paris in 1717 to complete his training, first in the atelier of Louis Galloche (1670–1761), peintre du Roi and professor at the Académie royale de peinture et de sculpture, and then in the atelier of François Lemoyne, whose training shaped Natoire's style. Later, as a history painter, Natoire would instruct students at the Royal Academy.

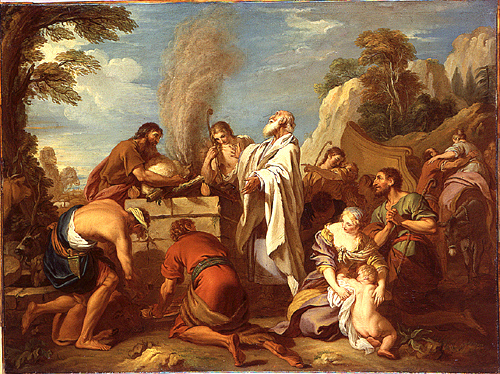
"Le sacrifice de Manué"

In 1721 he was awarded the Prix de Rome from the French Académie Royale with a Sacrifice of Manoah to obtain a son. On 30 June 1723 he was appointed a pensionnaire at the French Academy in Rome, at the time lodged in the Palazzo Mancini, where he arrived in October. During his stay he executed a copy of Pietro da Cortona's Rape of the Sabine Women. In December 1725 he won a first prize from the Accademia di San Luca with a Moses Returning from Sinai. In 1728 he painted for the French ambassador, the prince de Polignac, an Expulsion of the Money-Changers from the Temple.

== In Paris (1730–1751) ==
Natoire returned to Paris via Venice in the early part of 1729. He was received into the Académie royale de peinture et de sculpture on 30 September 1730.

His reputation was quickly established, and he received major commissions notably from French Queen Marie Leszczyńska to paint several of her children. From 1731 to 1740 he provided several suites of canvasses for Philibert Orry, contrôleur général des finances, who was to succeed the duc d'Antin as general director of the Bâtiments du Roi in 1736. For Orry's Château de La Chapelle-Godefroy at Saint-Aubin, Aube Natoire provided a series of nine canvasses of Histories of the Gods, six more of the History of Clovis, six of a History of Telemachus and four Seasons. During the same period, in 1732 he provided three overdoors on Old Testament subjects for the duc d'Antin in Paris.

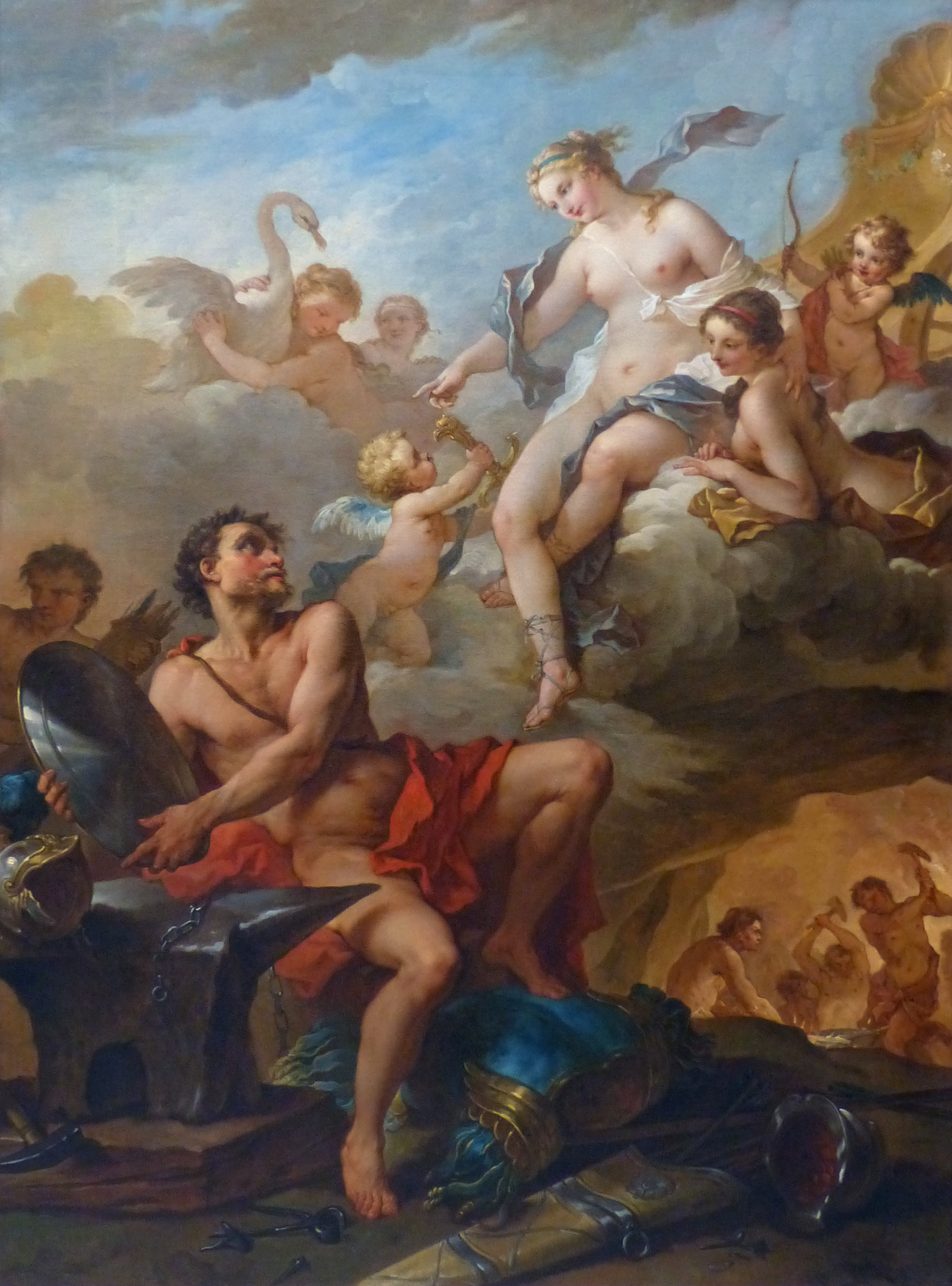
"Venus Demanding Arms from Vulcan for Aeneas"

In June 1734, Natoire submitted to an Exposition de la Jeunesse in place Dauphine a Galatea. In the same year his first royal commission arrived, for the Chambre de la Reine at Versailles and was made a full member of the Académie on 31 December with a Venus Commanding from Vulcan the Arms of Aeneas. Henceforth, numerous royal commissions came his way for the petits appartements at the Château de Fontainebleau, for the Cabinet du Roi and the royal dining-room at Versailles, decorations for Marly, for the Cabinet des Médailles in the royal library in Paris, and others.

In 1735, Natoire carried out the first of his tapestry cartoons for the series Histoire de Don Quichotte woven at the Manufacture de Beauvais, the first set for the fermier général Pierre Grimod du Fort (1692–1748). In 1737 he received the commission for the Hôtel de Soubise. From 1741, he produced a series of cartoons for the History of Mark Anthony woven at the Gobelins.

In 1747, he painted the portrait of Louis, Dauphin of France. In a more familiar vein, he provided a Saint Stephen and the False Witnesses for the chapelle Saint-Symphorien in the Church of Saint-Germain-des-Prés, 1745. A major loss was his illusionistic decor for the chapel in the Hôpital des Enfants-Trouvés (1746–1750), built by Germain Boffrand but demolished in the 19th century. Also in 1747 he participated in the competition organized by the new general director of the Bâtiments du Roi, Le Normant de Tournehem, with the Triumph of Bacchus, now in the Musée du Louvre.

== Second Roman stay (1751–1777) ==
In 1751, Natoire was appointed director of the French Academy in Rome, a prestigious position, but one that was to set a seal on his active career. Far from court, Natoire witnessed his rivals Carle Van Loo, then François Boucher named premier peintre du Roi in turn. He all but ceased painting, turning his energies instead to the Academy, pressing the pensionnaires to produce the envoies that were forwarded to Paris as proof of their progress and sending them out to draw in the countryside of the Roman campagna. Among his students were Hubert Robert and Jean-Honore Fragonard.

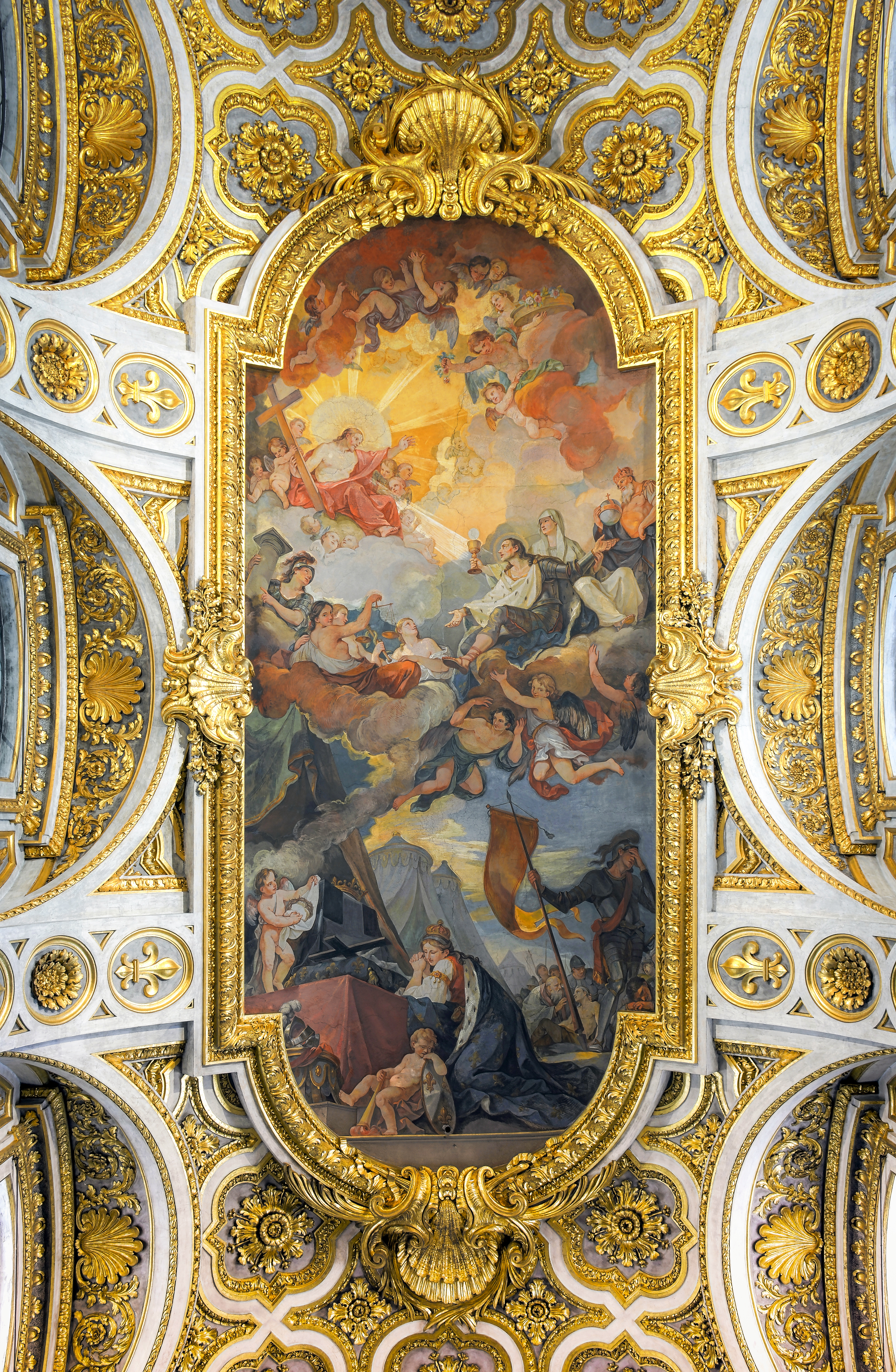
San Luigi dei Francesi (Rome) - Ceiling

He was ennobled in April 1753 and received the Order of Saint-Michel, an honour he had impatiently awaited, but he found himself out of sympathy with the new neoclassical style that was being developed by the Academy's pensionnaires. His own fresco of the Apotheosis of Saint Louis for the French national Church of San Luigi dei Francesi, 1754–1756, came in for criticism.

Natoire's late work, in the two decades that remained to him was largely confined to numerous drawings of the Campagna for his own pleasure, and few canvasses. He became more religious.

In 1767, the architect Adrien Mouton, who had been expelled from the Academy, brought a suit that he won in 1770: Natoire was fined 20,000 livres and court costs with interest, accused of administrative errors. The new general director of the Bâtiments, the comte d'Angiviller retired Natoire from office in June 1775.

He withdrew to Castel Gandolfo, where he died. He was 77 years old.

== Gallery of selected work ==
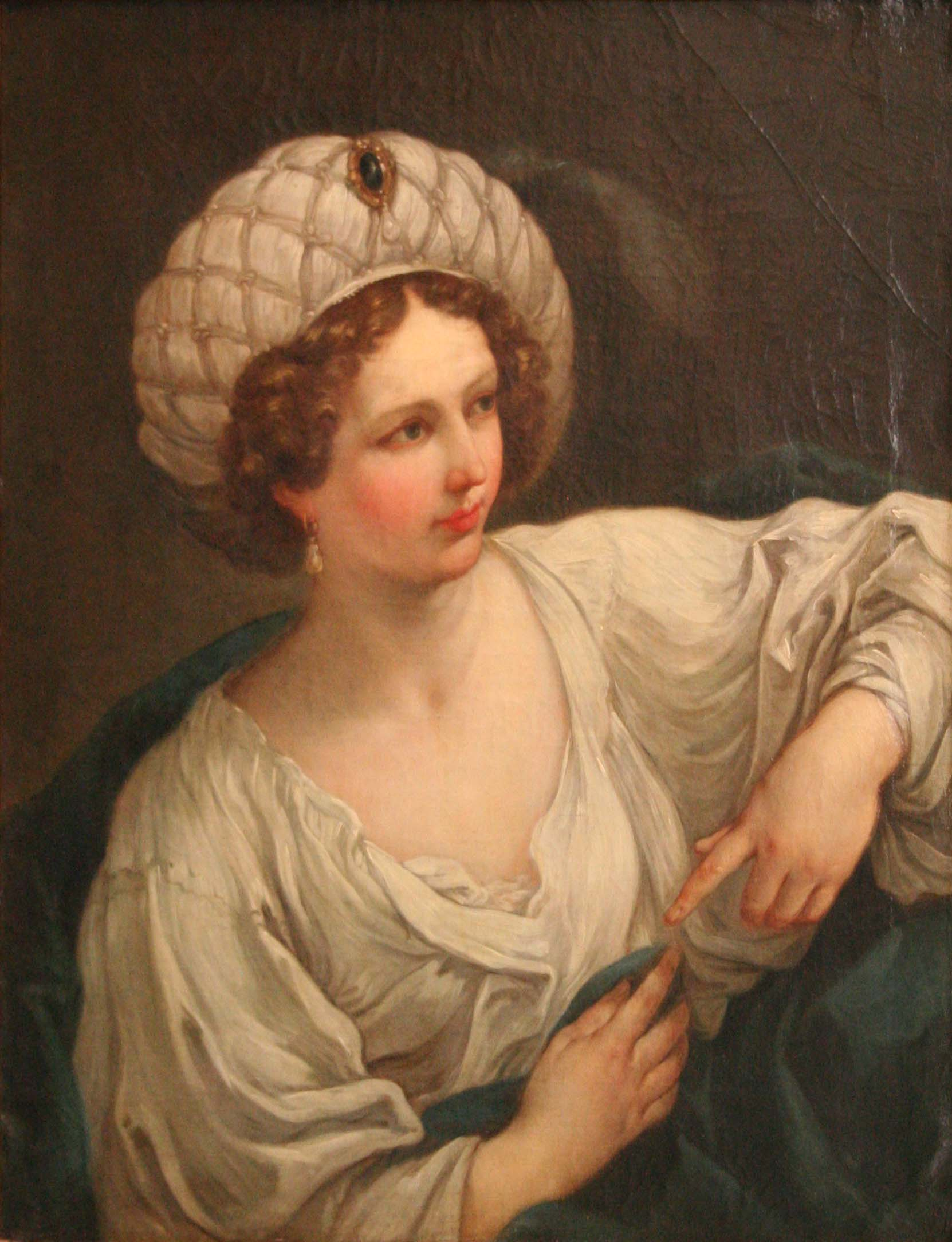
Sibylle

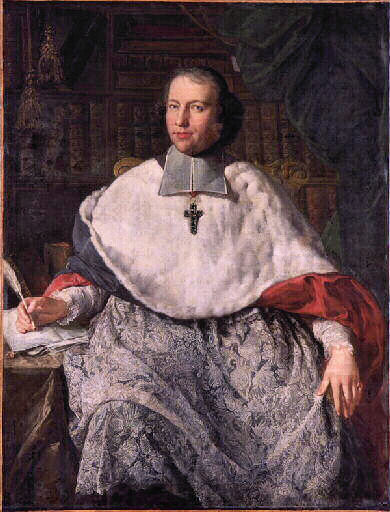
Portrait of French bishop and theologian Jean-Joseph Languet de Gergy.

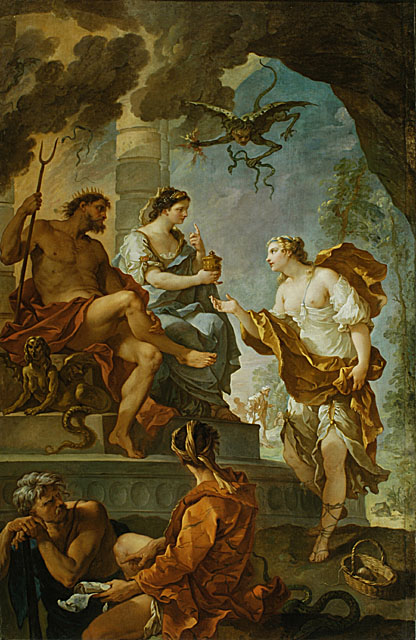
Psyche and Proserpina.

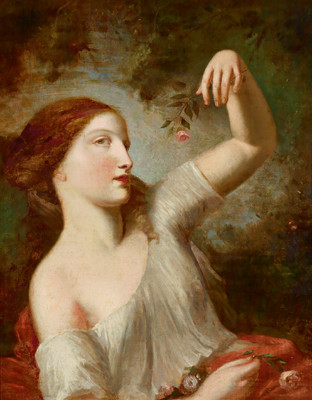
Young women with roses.

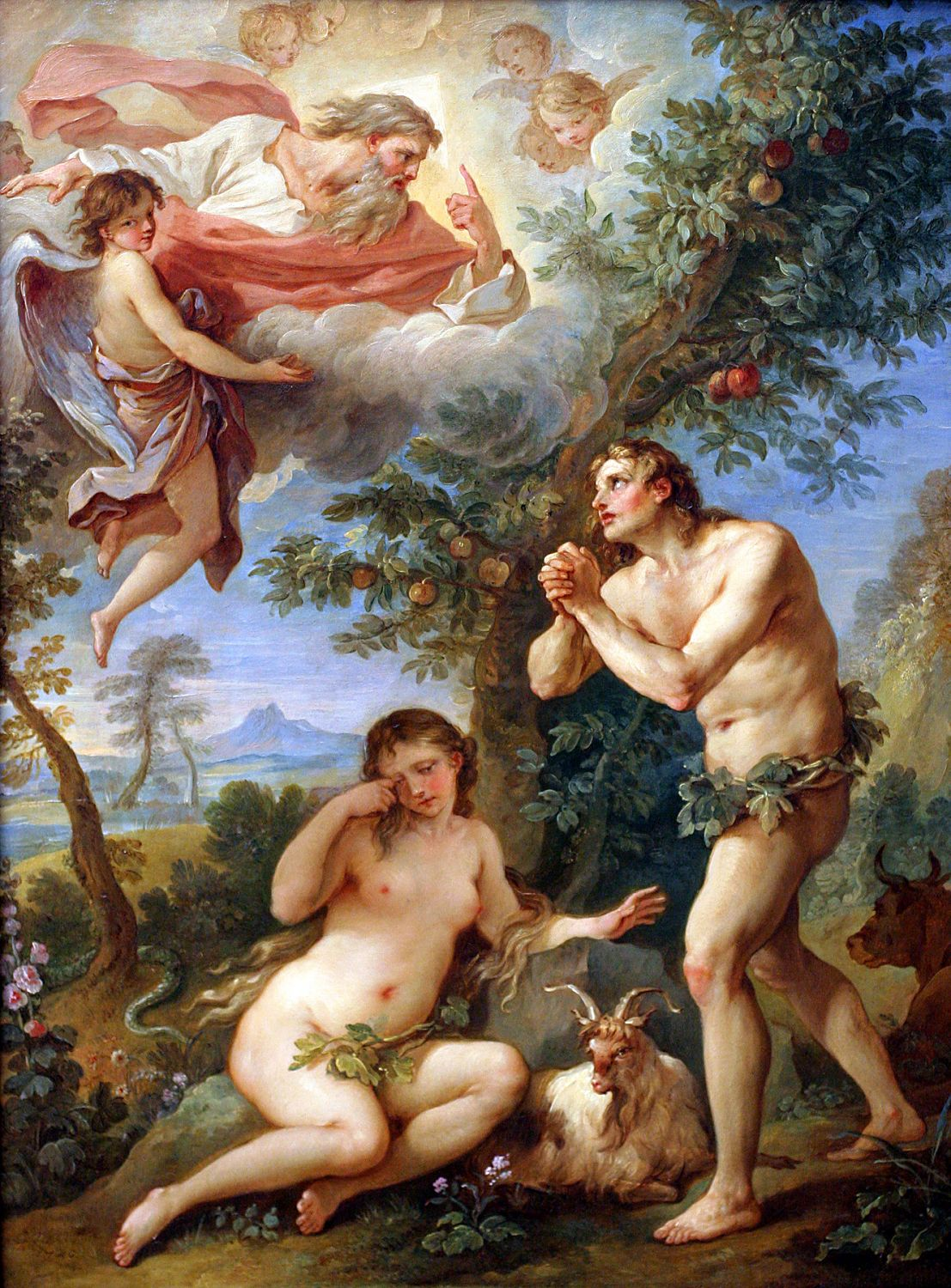
The Rebuke of Adam and Eve (1740)

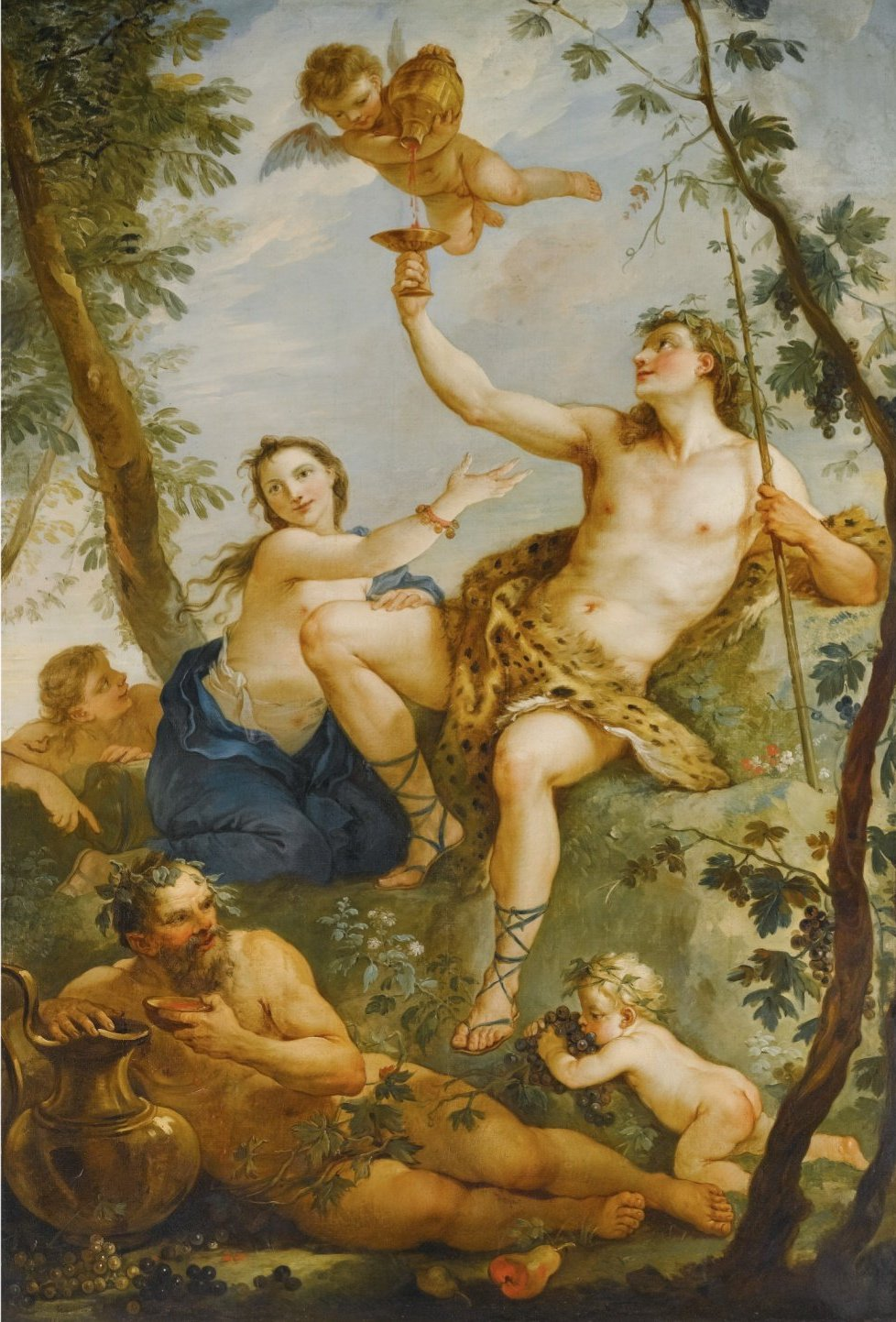
The Triumph of Bacchus
