= Traînel =

Commune in Grand Est, France

- Commune
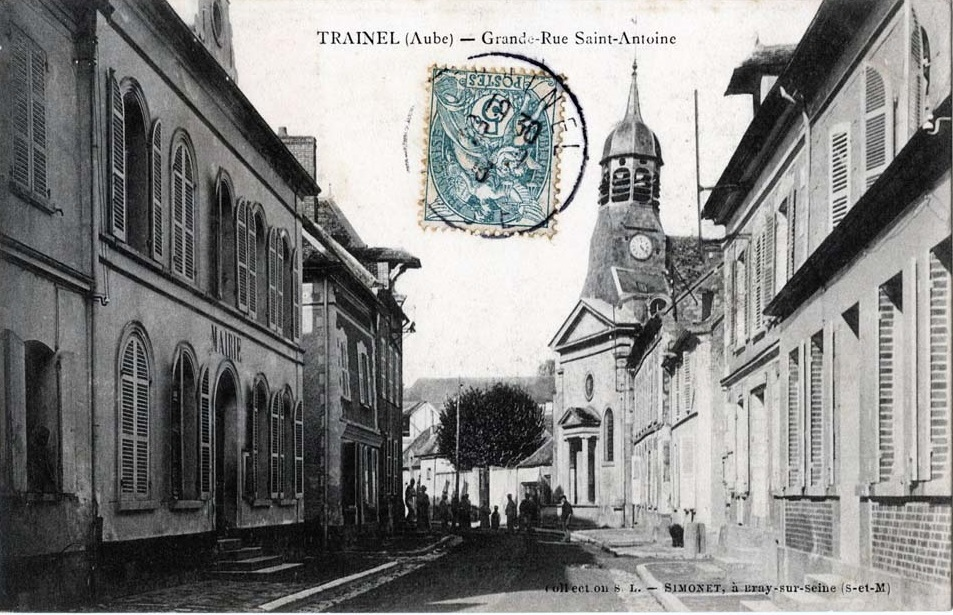
- St Antoine street in Traînel

- Coat of arms
- Location of Traînel
- Location within France Location within Grand Est
- Coordinates: 48°24′56″N 3°26′30″E
- Country: France
- Region: Grand Est
- Department: Aube
- Arrondissement: Nogent-sur-Seine
- Canton: Nogent-sur-Seine
- Intercommunality: Nogentais

Government
  - Mayor (2020–2026): Didier Droy
- Area^{1}: 19.99 km^{2} (7.72 sq mi)
- Elevation: 74 m (243 ft)
- Highest elevation: 154 m (505 ft)
- Lowest elevation: 66 m (217 ft)
- Population (2023): 1,094
  - Density: 54.73/km^{2} (141.7/sq mi)
- Time zone: UTC+01:00 (CET)
  - Summer (DST): UTC+02:00 (CEST)
- INSEE/Postal code: 10382 /10400
- ^{1} French Land Register data, which excludes lakes, ponds, glaciers > 1 km^{2} (0.386 sq mi or 247 acres) and river estuaries.

Traînel (French pronunciation: [tʁɛnɛl]) is a commune in the Aube department in north-central France.

== Population ==
Historical population
Year	Pop.	±% p.a.
1968	844	—
1975	829	−0.26%
1982	853	+0.41%
1990	847	−0.09%
1999	983	+1.67%
2007	1,026	+0.54%
2012	1,070	+0.84%
2017	1,062	−0.15%
2023	1,094	+0.50%
Source: INSEE

== See also ==
- Communes of the Aube department
