= Pont-sur-Seine =

Commune in Grand Est, France

- Commune
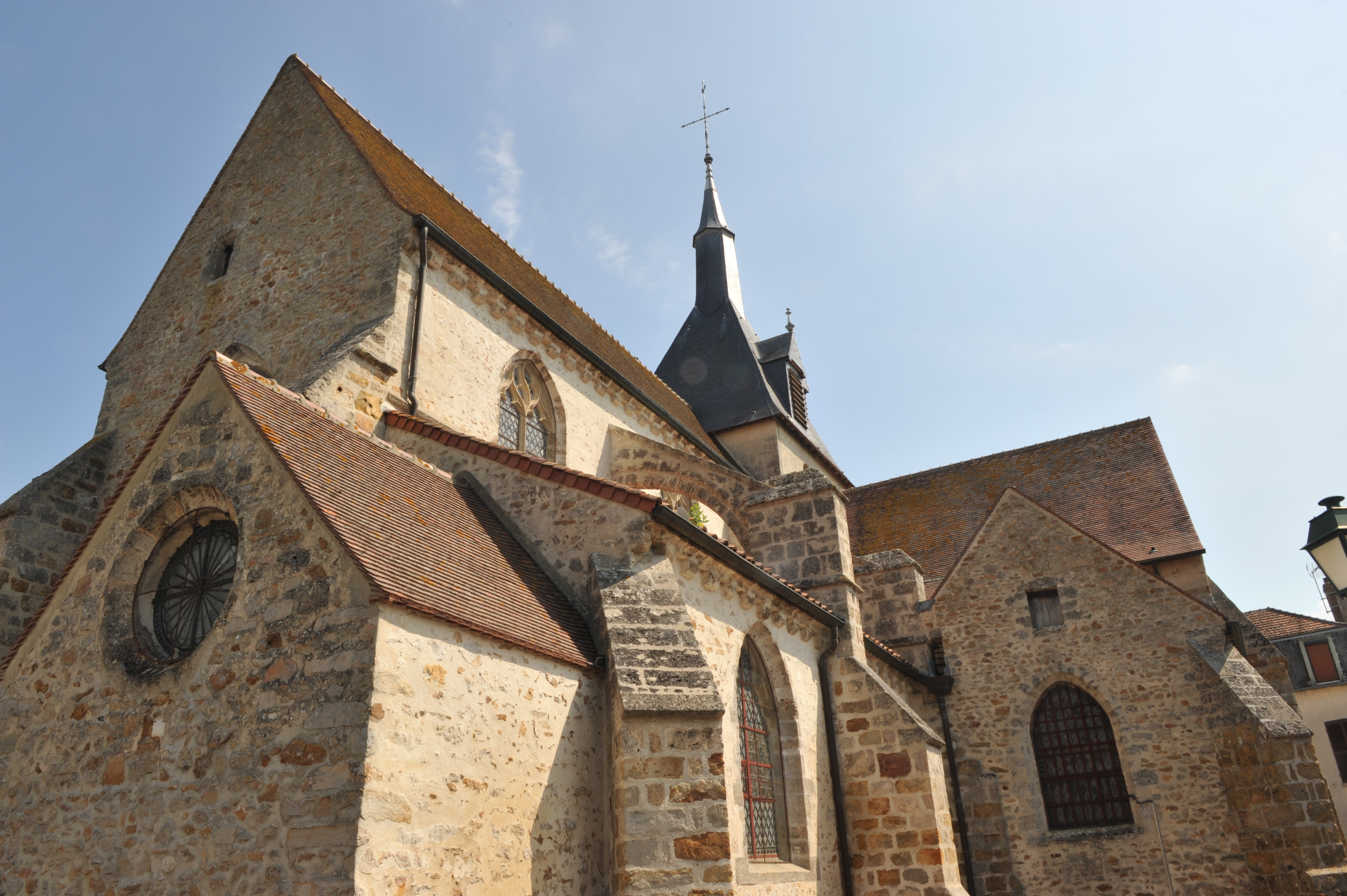
- The church in Pont-sur-Seine

- Coat of arms
- Location of Pont-sur-Seine
- Location within France Location within Grand Est
- Coordinates: 48°31′11″N 3°35′44″E
- Country: France
- Region: Grand Est
- Department: Aube
- Arrondissement: Nogent-sur-Seine
- Canton: Nogent-sur-Seine
- Intercommunality: Nogentais

Government
  - Mayor (2020–2026): Denis Desmares
- Area^{1}: 16.15 km^{2} (6.24 sq mi)
- Elevation: 71 m (233 ft)
- Highest elevation: 208 m (682 ft)
- Lowest elevation: 63 m (207 ft)
- Population (2023): 1,089
  - Density: 67.43/km^{2} (174.6/sq mi)
- Time zone: UTC+01:00 (CET)
  - Summer (DST): UTC+02:00 (CEST)
- INSEE/Postal code: 10298 /10400
- ^{1} French Land Register data, which excludes lakes, ponds, glaciers > 1 km^{2} (0.386 sq mi or 247 acres) and river estuaries.

Pont-sur-Seine (French pronunciation: [pɔ̃ syʁ sɛn], literally Bridge on Seine) is a commune in the Aube department in north-central France.

== Population ==
Historical population
Year	Pop.	±% p.a.
1968	734	—
1975	925	+3.36%
1982	994	+1.03%
1990	887	−1.41%
1999	935	+0.59%
2007	984	+0.64%
2012	1,086	+1.99%
2017	1,161	+1.34%
2023	1,089	−1.06%
Source: INSEE

== See also ==
- Communes of the Aube department
- List of medieval bridges in France
