= Gomery =

Gomery is a rare surname found mainly in the United Kingdom, France and North America. In some cases Gomery has arisen by a process of aphaeresis, where the Mont- has gradually been lost from the surname Montgomery, a place name in Normandy. This place name is already associated with the first name Gomery and means "Gomery's hill". Gomery was the name of the owner, originally Gumaric, Germanic personal name, that is a compound of two elements: guma "man" (Old English guma; brȳdeguma > bridegroom; German: Bräutigam) and ric "power" (Old English rīc in "bishopric"). This Germanic name still survives today in the German first name Gumarich.

In England in the 18th century, it was concentrated in the county of Worcestershire and had frequent variants as Gumery or Gummery. By the time of the 1881 census of England and Wales it was still concentrated in the Midlands region, but had spread to other industrial centres in the country. In the 1881 census of England and Wales there were 75 people recorded with the surname Gomery. In 2002 there were 152 persons with the surname Gomery in England and Wales, making it the 25,427th most common surname.

== As a placename ==
- Gomery, village in southern Belgium, in the municipality of Virton, province of Luxembourg and Gaume region, seat of the de Gerlache de Gomery family.

== Notable people with the surname Gomery ==
- Adrien Victor Joseph Baron de Gerlache de Gomery (1866–1934), Belgian naval officer who led the first Antarctic expedition to concentrate on scientific observation from 1897 to 1899. Sailing with him as mate on the "Belgica" was Roald Amundsen, who on a subsequent expedition of his own was the first to reach the South Pole. The "Belgica" was trapped in the pack ice of the Antarctic for 13 months and became the first vessel to winter in the Antarctic. Adrien Baron de Gerlache de Gomery assisted the English explorer Sir Ernest Shackleton in planning his Antarctic crossing of 1914 to 1917.
- John H. Gomery, Canadian High Court judge in charge of the Gomery Commission.
- Percy Gomery (1881–1960), author and novelist. Wrote "A Motor Scamper 'Cross Canada" in 1922, and "Hot and Cold Laid On: Burrowing in Britain" in 1946.
- Robert Gomery (c. 1778 – 1853), actor and singer in early 19th-century London, the natural father of Robert Montgomery (1807-1855).

Gomery may also refer to:

- The Canadian Sponsorship scandal and the investigation by the Gomery Commission.
