= Walter Gummery =

English footballer (1900–1979)

Personal information
- Full name: Walter Harry Gummery
- Date of birth: 1 May 1900
- Place of birth: Worcester, England
- Date of death: 1979 (aged 83–84)
- Position: Winger

Senior career*
Years	Team	Apps	(Gls)
1923–1924	Worcester City		
1924–1925	Wolverhampton Wanderers	10	(1)
1925–1926	Accrington Stanley	31	(3)
1926	Worcester City		
Total		41	(4)
- * Club domestic league appearances and goals

Walter Harry Gummery (1 May 1900 – 1979) was an English footballer who played in the Football League for Accrington Stanley and Wolverhampton Wanderers.
