= Plessis-Barbuise =

Commune in Grand Est, France

- Commune
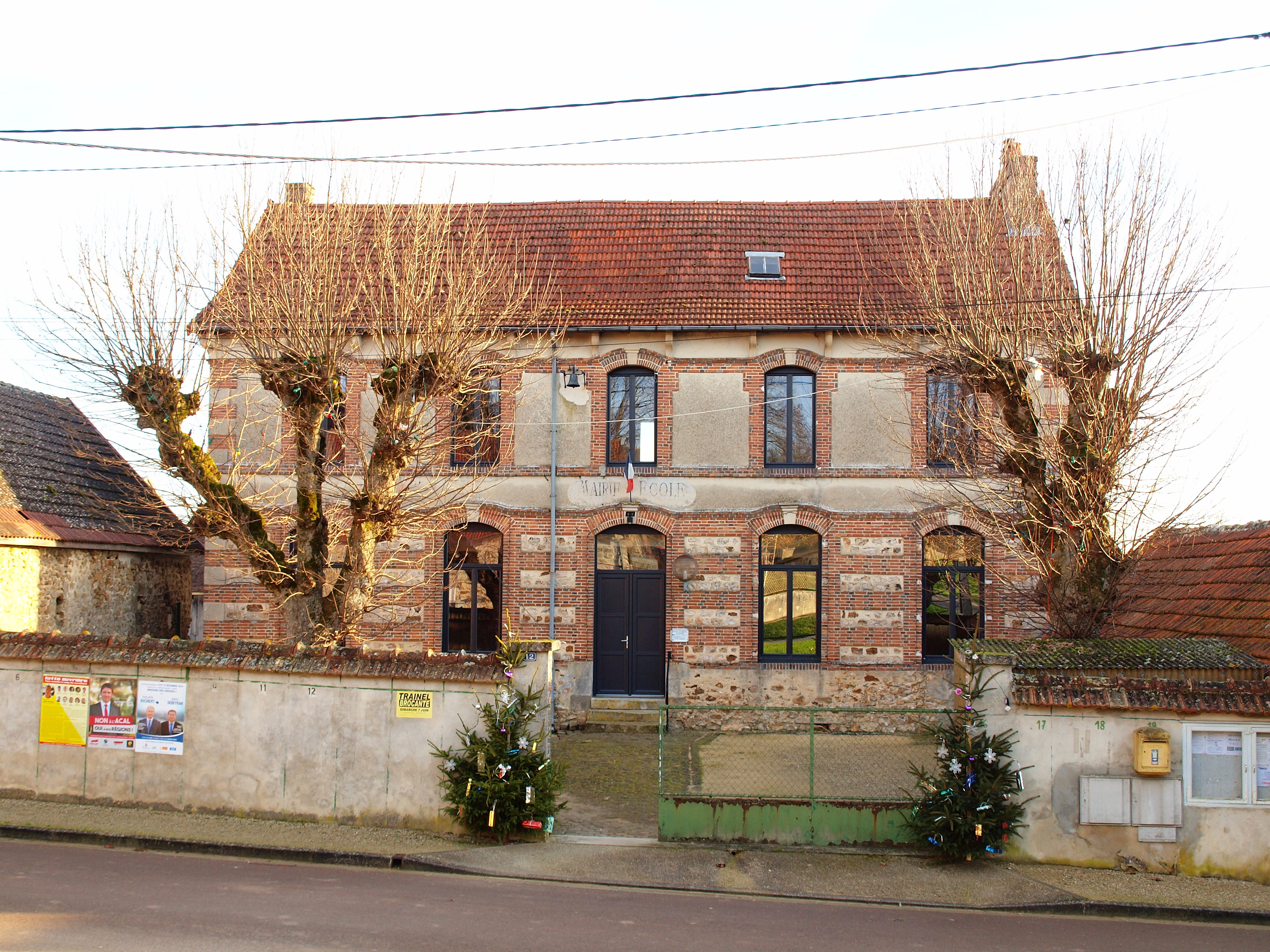
- The town hall in Plessis-Barbuise
- Location of Plessis-Barbuise
- Location within France Location within Grand Est
- Coordinates: 48°34′39″N 3°35′09″E
- Country: France
- Region: Grand Est
- Department: Aube
- Arrondissement: Nogent-sur-Seine
- Canton: Nogent-sur-Seine
- Intercommunality: Nogentais

Government
  - Mayor (2020–2026): Gilbert Pernin
- Area^{1}: 5.5 km^{2} (2.1 sq mi)
- Elevation: 91 m (299 ft)
- Population (2023): 184
  - Density: 33/km^{2} (87/sq mi)
- Time zone: UTC+01:00 (CET)
  - Summer (DST): UTC+02:00 (CEST)
- INSEE/Postal code: 10291 /10400
- ^{1} French Land Register data, which excludes lakes, ponds, glaciers > 1 km^{2} (0.386 sq mi or 247 acres) and river estuaries.

Plessis-Barbuise (French pronunciation: [plɛsi baʁbɥiz]) is a commune in the Aube department in north-central France.

== Population ==
Historical population
| Year | Pop. | ±% p.a. |
|---|---|---|
| 1968 | 116 | — |
| 1975 | 101 | −1.96% |
| 1982 | 100 | −0.14% |
| 1990 | 94 | −0.77% |
| 1999 | 125 | +3.22% |
| 2007 | 152 | +2.47% |
| 2012 | 157 | +0.65% |
| 2017 | 202 | +5.17% |
| 2023 | 184 | −1.54% |
Source: INSEE

== History ==
This village is mentioned under the name of Plesseium in 1157 in a charter of the Abbey of Paraclet.

In 1793, the commune was called Le Plessy Barbuise. In 1801, its name became Le Plessis-Barbuise.

== See also ==
- Communes of the Aube department
