= Montpothier =

Commune in Grand Est, France

- Commune
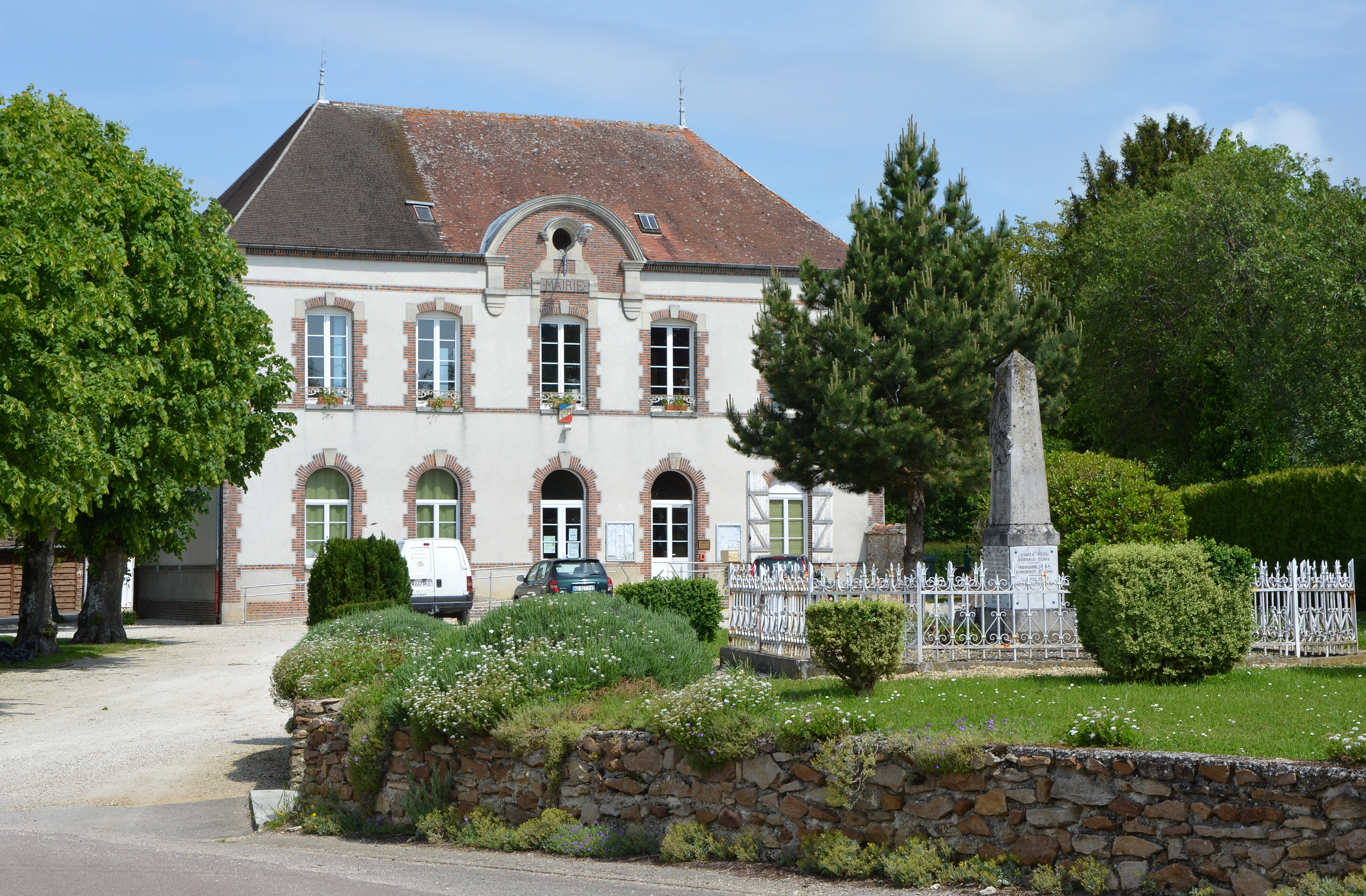
- Town hall
- Location of Montpothier
- Location within France Location within Grand Est
- Coordinates: 48°34′24″N 3°31′10″E
- Country: France
- Region: Grand Est
- Department: Aube
- Arrondissement: Nogent-sur-Seine
- Canton: Nogent-sur-Seine
- Intercommunality: Nogentais

Government
  - Mayor (2020–2026): César Cornaz
- Area^{1}: 7.72 km^{2} (2.98 sq mi)
- Elevation: 150 m (490 ft)
- Population (2023): 325
  - Density: 42.1/km^{2} (109/sq mi)
- Time zone: UTC+01:00 (CET)
  - Summer (DST): UTC+02:00 (CEST)
- INSEE/Postal code: 10254 /10400
- ^{1} French Land Register data, which excludes lakes, ponds, glaciers > 1 km^{2} (0.386 sq mi or 247 acres) and river estuaries.

Montpothier (French pronunciation: [mɔ̃pɔtje]) is a commune in the Aube department in north-central France.

== Population ==
Historical population
Year	Pop.	±% p.a.
1968	199	—
1975	209	+0.70%
1982	218	+0.60%
1990	225	+0.40%
1999	238	+0.63%
2007	310	+3.36%
2012	336	+1.62%
2017	331	−0.30%
2023	325	−0.30%
Source: INSEE

== See also ==
- Communes of the Aube department
