= Saint-Nicolas-la-Chapelle, Aube =

Commune in Grand Est, France

Saint-Nicolas-la-Chapelle
- Commune
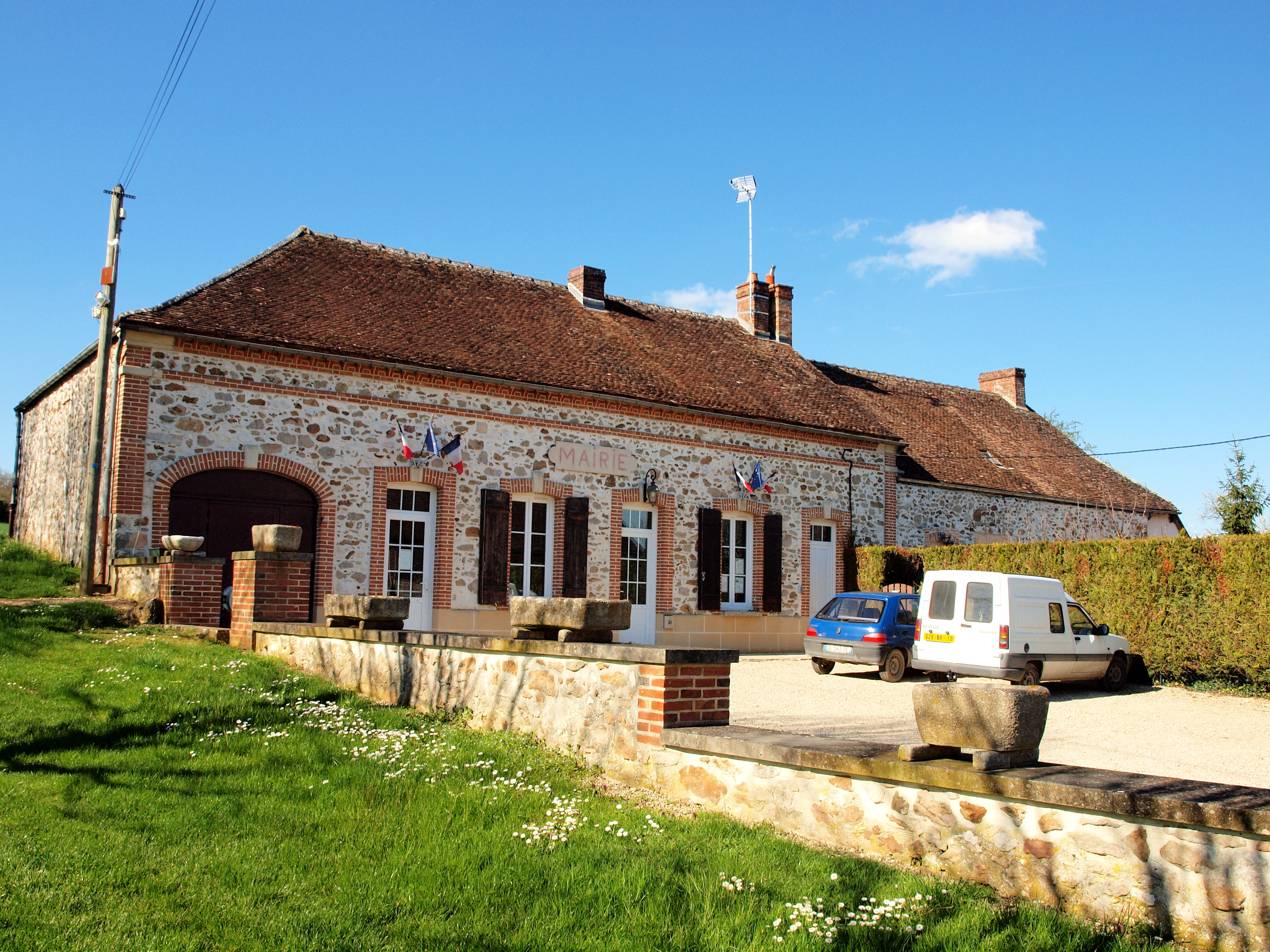
- The town hall in Saint-Nicolas-la-Chapelle
- Location of Saint-Nicolas-la-Chapelle
- Location within France Location within Grand Est
- Coordinates: 48°31′53″N 3°28′05″E
- Country: France
- Region: Grand Est
- Department: Aube
- Arrondissement: Nogent-sur-Seine
- Canton: Nogent-sur-Seine
- Intercommunality: Nogentais

Government
  - Mayor (2020–2026): Gilbert Lemaur
- Area^{1}: 11.54 km^{2} (4.46 sq mi)
- Elevation: 115 m (377 ft)
- Population (2023): 81
  - Density: 7.0/km^{2} (18/sq mi)
- Time zone: UTC+01:00 (CET)
  - Summer (DST): UTC+02:00 (CEST)
- INSEE/Postal code: 10355 /10400
- ^{1} French Land Register data, which excludes lakes, ponds, glaciers > 1 km^{2} (0.386 sq mi or 247 acres) and river estuaries.

Saint-Nicolas-la-Chapelle (French pronunciation: [sɛ̃ nikɔla la ʃapɛl]) is a commune in the Aube department in north-central France.

== Population ==
Historical population
Year	Pop.	±% p.a.
1968	70	—
1975	68	−0.41%
1982	70	+0.41%
1990	61	−1.71%
1999	79	+2.91%
2007	77	−0.32%
2012	68	−2.46%
2017	66	−0.60%
2023	81	+3.47%
Source: INSEE

== See also ==
- Communes of the Aube department
