= La Villeneuve-au-Châtelot =

Commune in Grand Est, France

- Commune
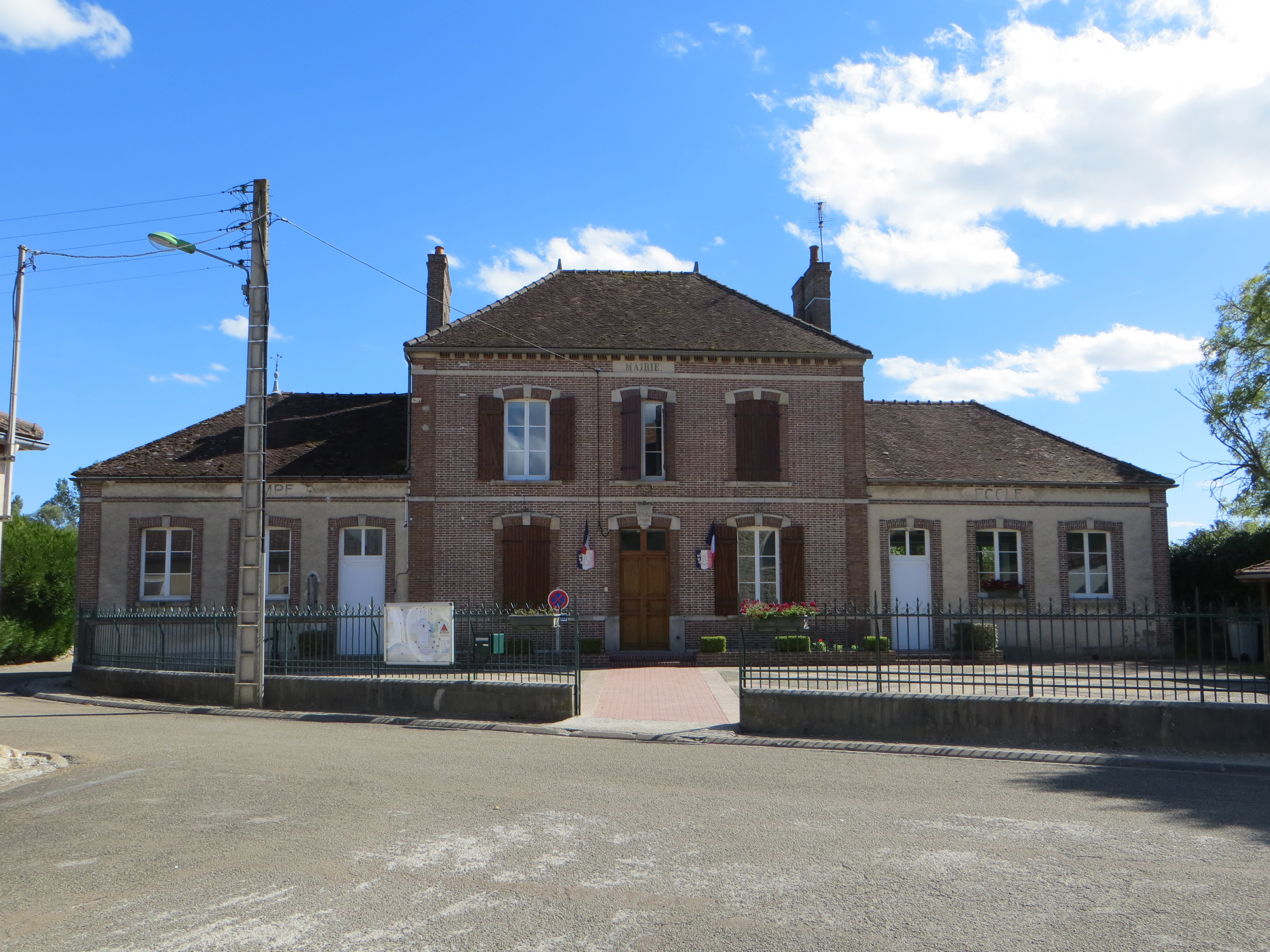
- The town hall in La Villeneuve-au-Châtelot
- Location of La Villeneuve-au-Châtelot
- Location within France Location within Grand Est
- Coordinates: 48°33′03″N 3°36′45″E
- Country: France
- Region: Grand Est
- Department: Aube
- Arrondissement: Nogent-sur-Seine
- Canton: Nogent-sur-Seine
- Intercommunality: Nogentais

Government
  - Mayor (2020–2026): Frédéric Lenouvel
- Area^{1}: 6.17 km^{2} (2.38 sq mi)
- Elevation: 71 m (233 ft)
- Population (2023): 146
  - Density: 23.7/km^{2} (61.3/sq mi)
- Time zone: UTC+01:00 (CET)
  - Summer (DST): UTC+02:00 (CEST)
- INSEE/Postal code: 10421 /10400
- ^{1} French Land Register data, which excludes lakes, ponds, glaciers > 1 km^{2} (0.386 sq mi or 247 acres) and river estuaries.

La Villeneuve-au-Châtelot (French pronunciation: [la vilnœv o ʃatlo]) is a commune in the Aube department in north-central France.

== Population ==
Historical population
Year	Pop.	±% p.a.
1968	152	—
1975	110	−4.51%
1982	121	+1.37%
1990	146	+2.38%
1999	145	−0.08%
2007	127	−1.64%
2012	146	+2.83%
2017	146	+0.00%
2023	146	+0.00%
Source: INSEE

== See also ==
- Communes of the Aube department
