= Villenauxe-la-Grande =

Commune in Grand Est, France

- Commune
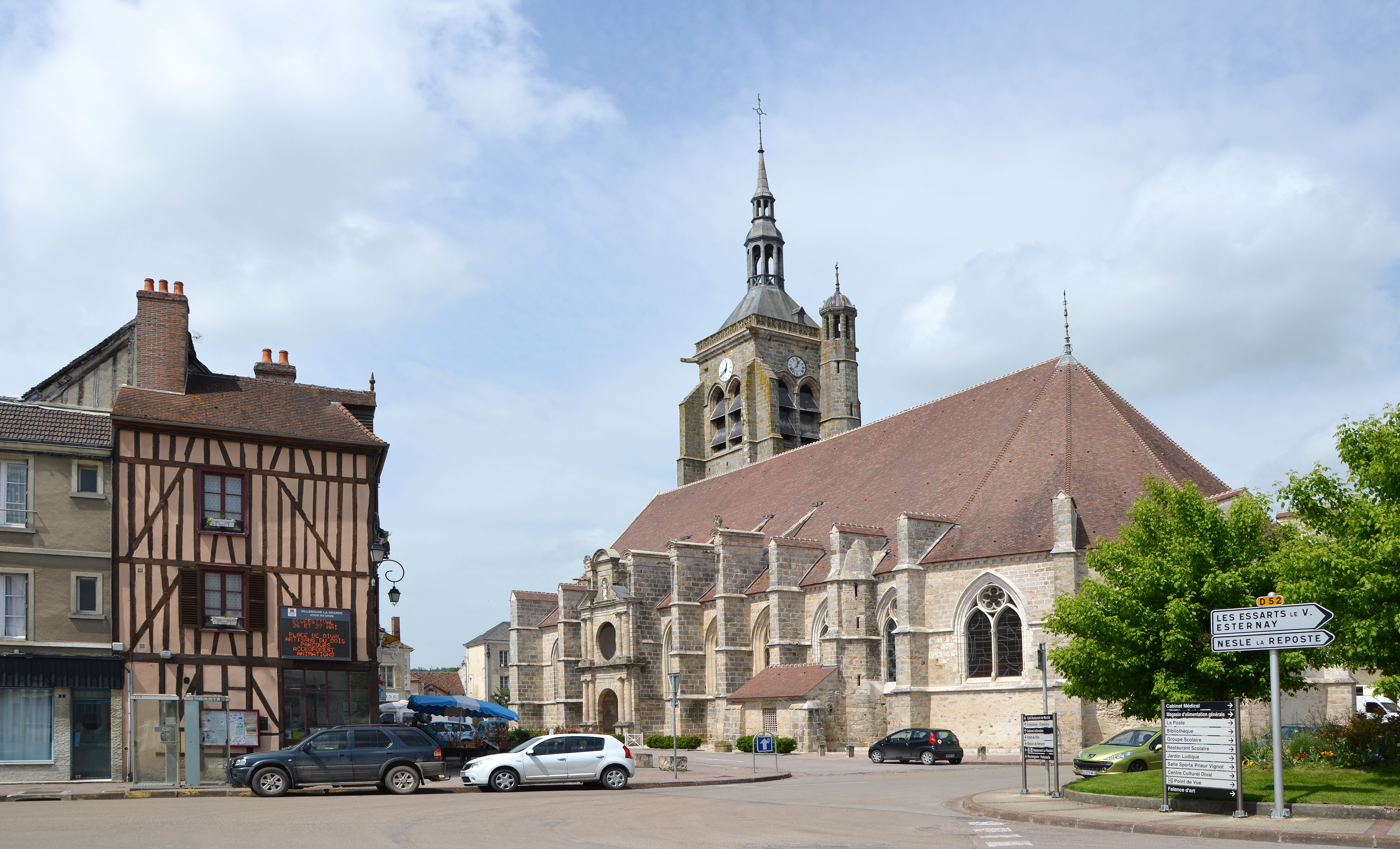
- The church and surroundings in Villenauxe-la-Grande

- Coat of arms
- Location of Villenauxe-la-Grande
- Location within France Location within Grand Est
- Coordinates: 48°35′31″N 3°33′29″E
- Country: France
- Region: Grand Est
- Department: Aube
- Arrondissement: Nogent-sur-Seine
- Canton: Nogent-sur-Seine
- Intercommunality: Nogentais

Government
  - Mayor (2020–2026): Barbara Carpanèse
- Area^{1}: 18.05 km^{2} (6.97 sq mi)
- Elevation: 80 m (260 ft)
- Highest elevation: 186 m (610 ft)
- Lowest elevation: 72 m (236 ft)
- Population (2023): 2,605
  - Density: 144.3/km^{2} (373.8/sq mi)
- Time zone: UTC+01:00 (CET)
  - Summer (DST): UTC+02:00 (CEST)
- INSEE/Postal code: 10420 /10370
- ^{1} French Land Register data, which excludes lakes, ponds, glaciers > 1 km^{2} (0.386 sq mi or 247 acres) and river estuaries.

Villenauxe-la-Grande (French pronunciation: [vilnoks la ɡʁɑ̃d]) is a commune in the Aube department in north-central France.

== Population ==
Historical population
Year	Pop.	±% p.a.
1968	2,017	—
1975	1,852	−1.21%
1982	1,818	−0.26%
1990	2,135	+2.03%
1999	2,666	+2.50%
2007	2,760	+0.43%
2012	2,794	+0.25%
2017	2,721	−0.53%
2023	2,605	−0.72%
Source: INSEE

== See also ==
- Communes of the Aube department
