= Gumery =

Commune in Grand Est, France

- Commune
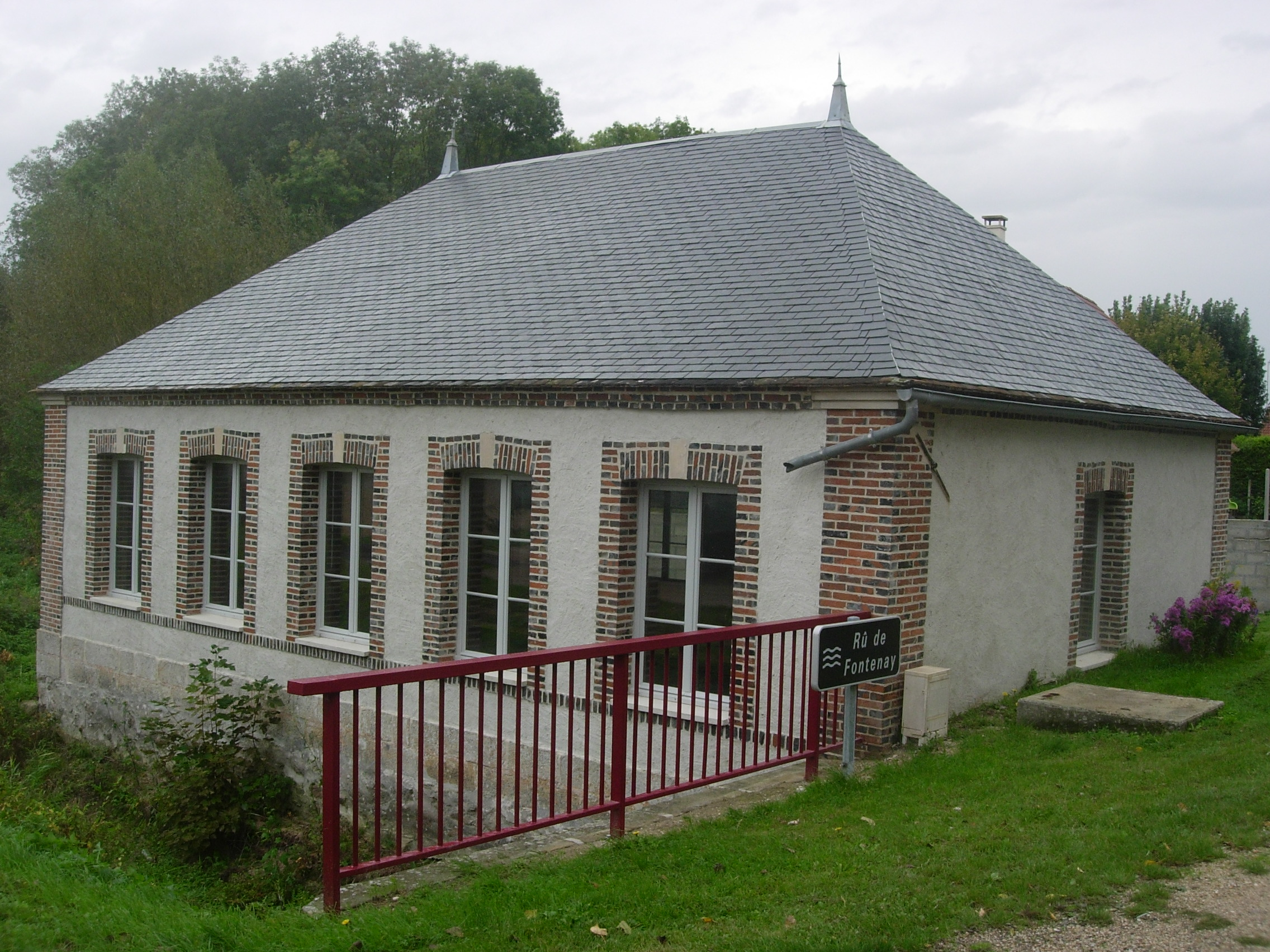
- Lavoir (wash house)

- Coat of arms
- Location of Gumery
- Location within France Location within Grand Est
- Coordinates: 48°26′56″N 3°25′53″E
- Country: France
- Region: Grand Est
- Department: Aube
- Arrondissement: Nogent-sur-Seine
- Canton: Nogent-sur-Seine
- Intercommunality: Nogentais

Government
  - Mayor (2020–2026): Philippe Bergner
- Area^{1}: 10.92 km^{2} (4.22 sq mi)
- Elevation: 65 m (213 ft)
- Population (2023): 225
  - Density: 20.6/km^{2} (53.4/sq mi)
- Time zone: UTC+01:00 (CET)
  - Summer (DST): UTC+02:00 (CEST)
- INSEE/Postal code: 10169 /10400
- ^{1} French Land Register data, which excludes lakes, ponds, glaciers > 1 km^{2} (0.386 sq mi or 247 acres) and river estuaries.

Gumery is a commune in the Aube département in north-central France.

== Population ==
Historical population
Year	Pop.	±% p.a.
1968	227	—
1975	217	−0.64%
1982	202	−1.02%
1990	210	+0.49%
1999	216	+0.31%
2007	225	+0.51%
2012	244	+1.63%
2017	233	−0.92%
2023	225	−0.58%
Source: INSEE

== See also ==
- Communes of the Aube department
