= List of châteaux in Champagne-Ardenne =

This is the list of châteaux, which are located in the former region of Champagne-Ardenne, France.

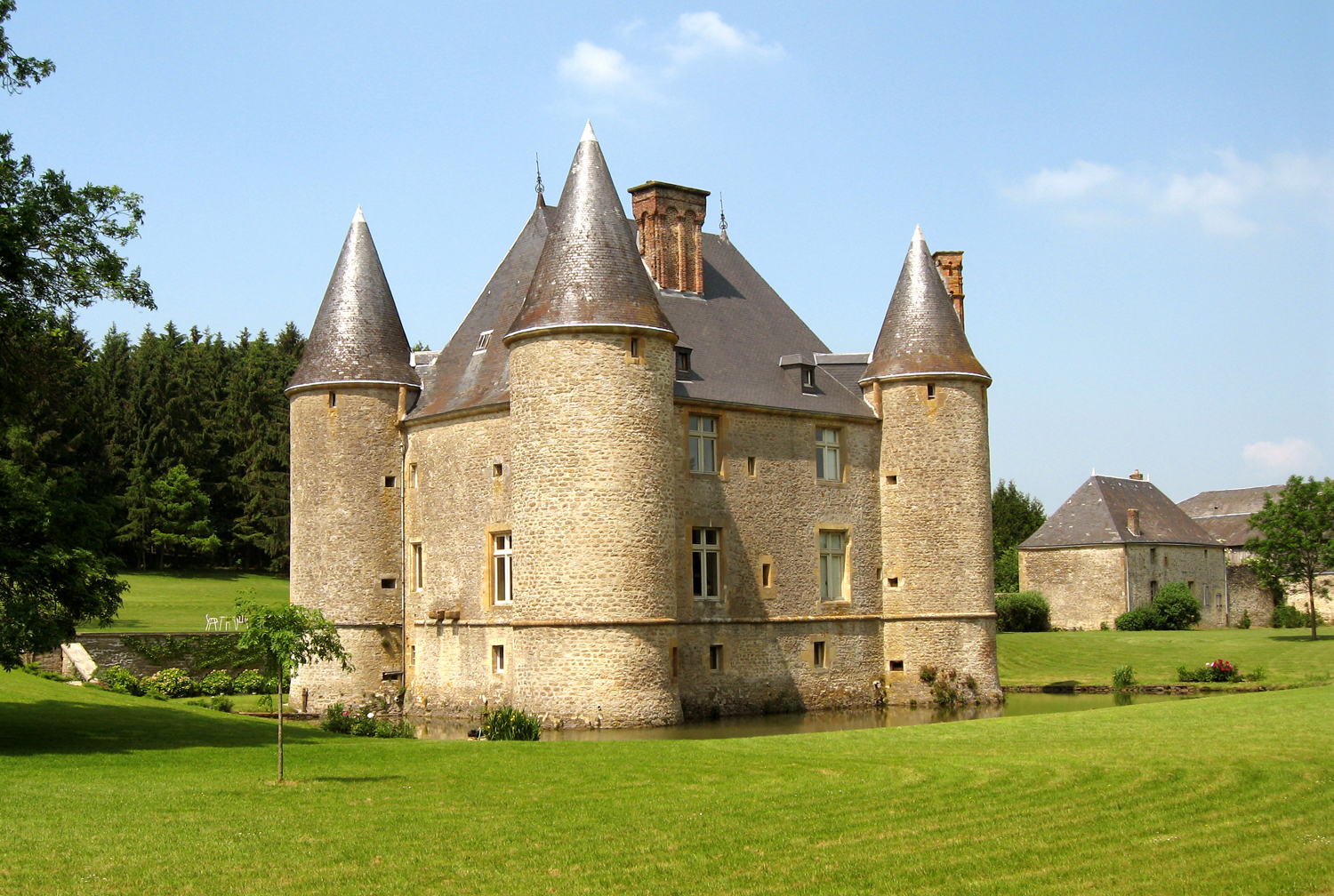
Château de Landreville

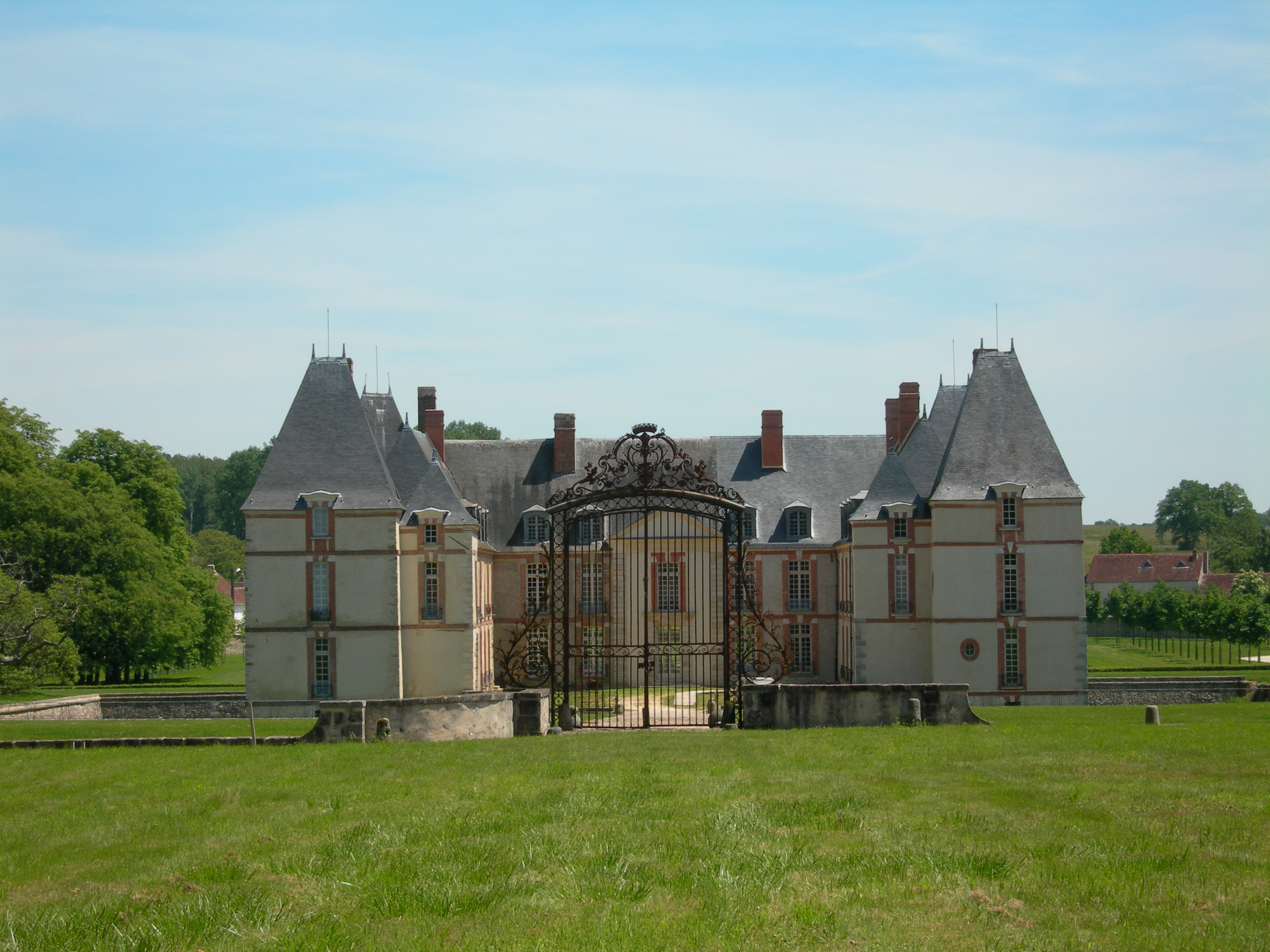
Château de Réveillon

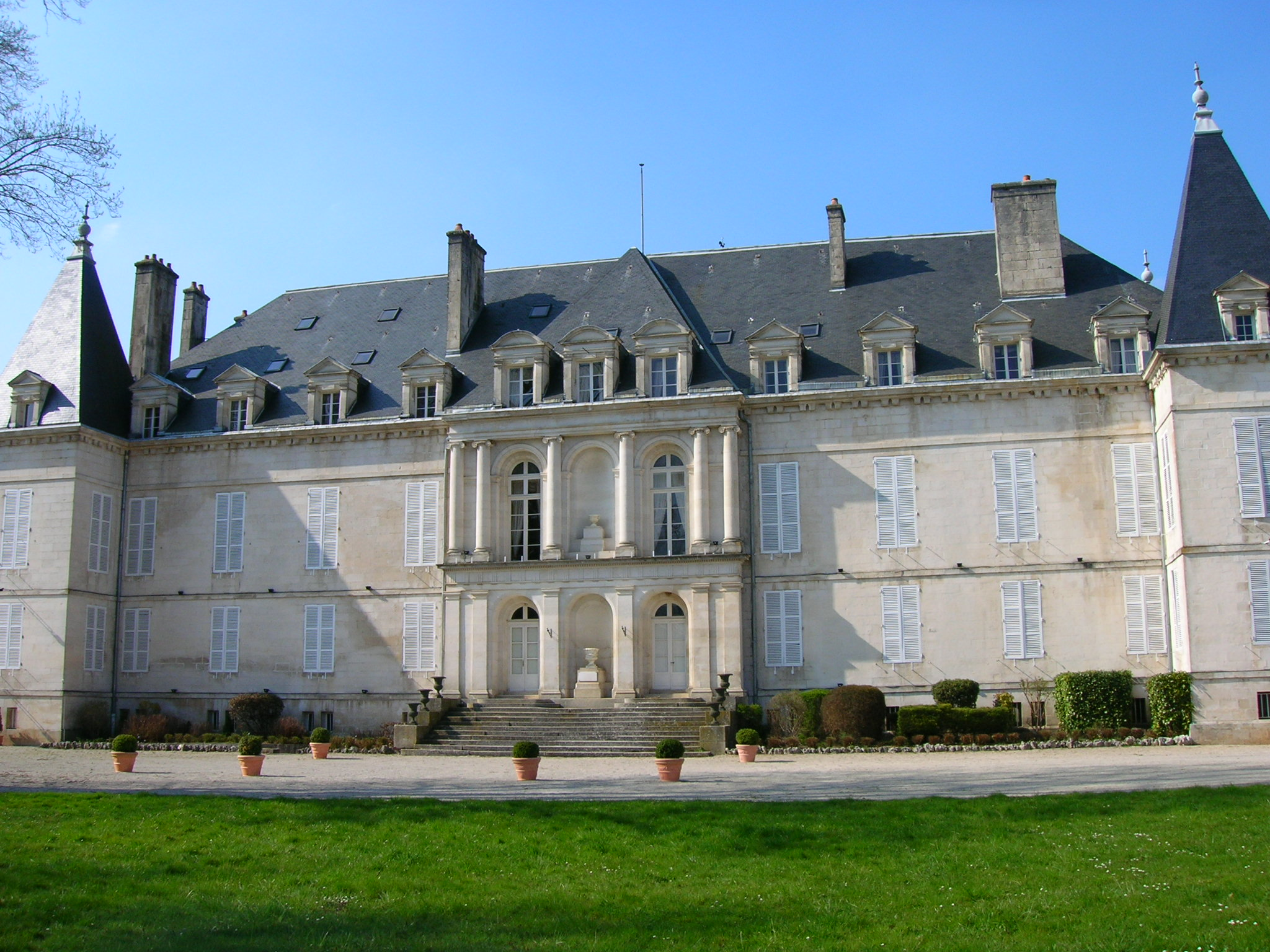
Château d'Arc-en-Barrois

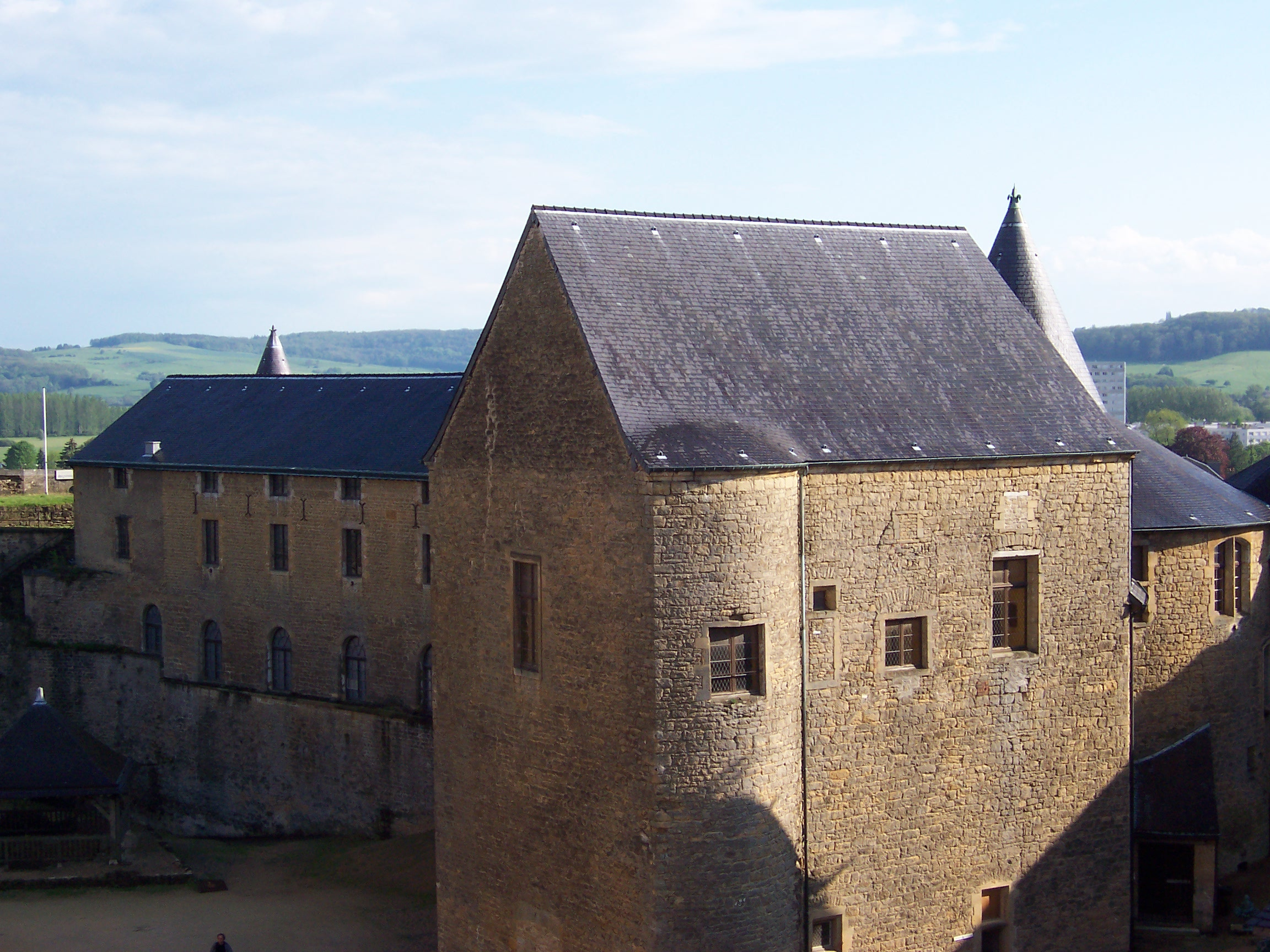
Château de Sedan

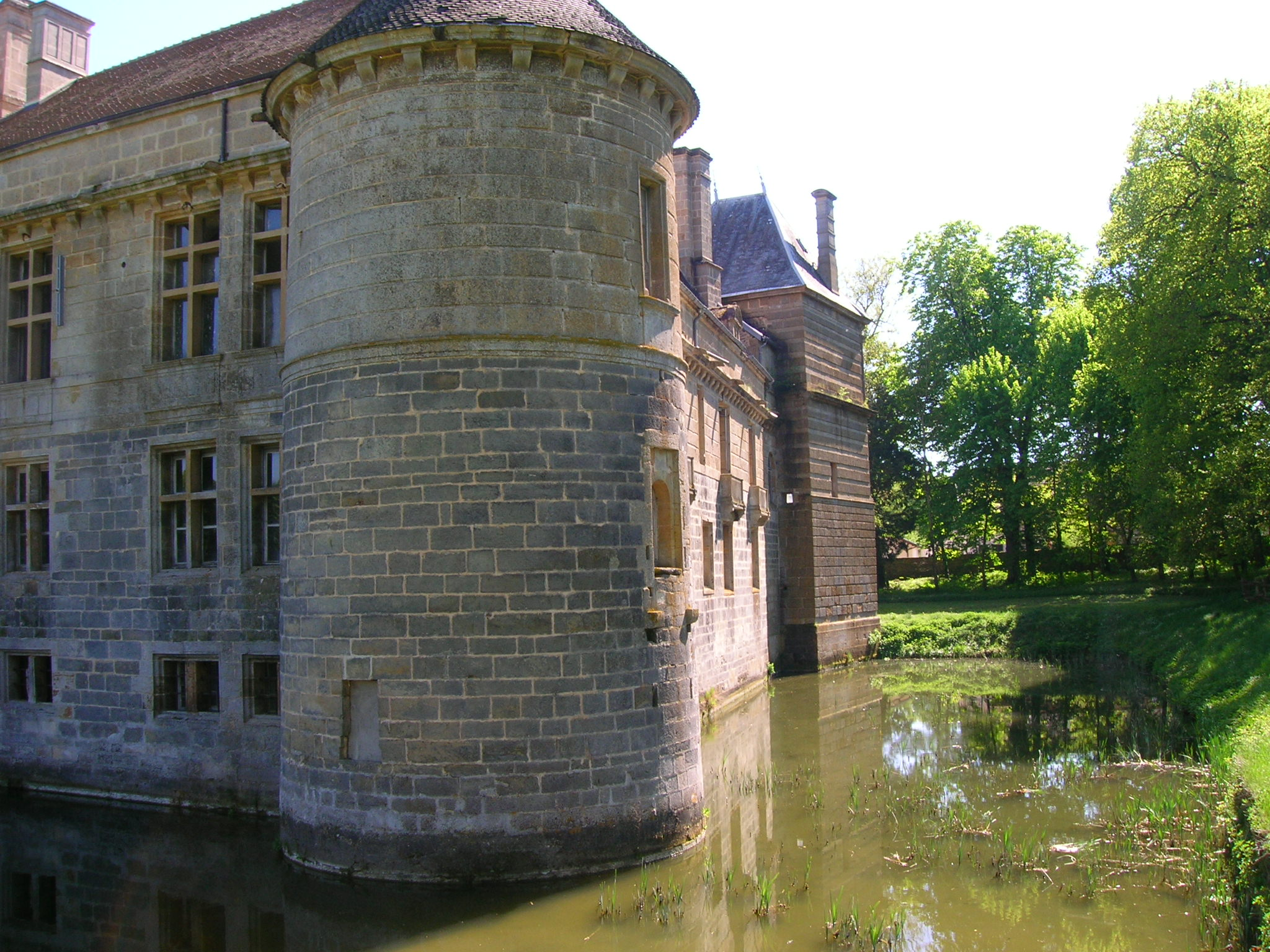
Château du Pailly

== Ardennes ==
- Château de la Cassine, in Vendresse
- Château de Doumely, in Doumely-Bégny
- Château de Hierges, in Hierges
- Château de Landreville, in Bayonville
- Château de Linchamps, in Nohan (commune of Thilay)
- Château de Montcornet, in Montcornet
- Château de Montvillers, in Bazeilles
- Château-Regnault, in Bogny-sur-Meuse)
- Château de Sedan, in Sedan

== Aube ==
- Château de Bar-sur-Seine, in Bar-sur-Seine
- Château de Bligny, in Bligny
- Château de Bouilly, in Bouilly
- Château de Bréviandes, in Bréviandes
- Château de Brienne, in Brienne-le-Château
- Château de Corbeau, in Chacenay
- Château de Jaucourt, in Jaucourt
- Château de La Motte-Tilly, in La Motte-Tilly
- Château de Pont-sur-Seine, in Pont-sur-Seine,
- Château de Praslin, in Praslin
- Château des Riceys, aux Riceys
- Château de Rumilly-lès-Vaudes, in Rumilly-lès-Vaudes
- Château de Vendeuvre-sur-Barse, in Vendeuvre-sur-Barse
- château de Villehardouin

== Haute-Marne ==
- Château d'Arc-en-Barrois, in Arc-en-Barrois
- Château d'Auberive, in Auberive
- Château d'Autreville, in Autreville-sur-la-Renne
- Château de Chalancey, in Chalancey
- Château de Châteauvillain, in Châteauvillain
- Château de Cirey, in Cirey-sur-Blaise
- Château de Dinteville, in Dinteville
- Château d'Ecot, in Ecot-la-Combe.
- Château du Grand Jardin, in Joinville
- Château de Lafauche, in Lafauche
- Château du Pailly, au Pailly
- Château de Prauthoy in Prauthoy
- Château de Reynel, in Reynel
- Château de Vignory, in Vignory
- Château de Vroncourt, in Vroncourt-la-Côte

== Marne ==
- Château de Boursault, in Boursault
- Château de Bussemont, in Saint-Lumier-la-Populeuse
- Château de Dormans, in Dormans
- Château d'Épernay, in Épernay
- Château d'Étrepy, in Étrepy
- Château de Gueux in Gueux
- Château de Louvois, in Louvois
- Château de Mareuil, in Mareuil-sur-Ay
- Château de la Marquetterie, in Pierry
- Château de Merfy, in Merfy
- Château de Montmirail, in Montmirail
- Château de Montmort, in Montmort-Lucy
- Château Perrier, in Épernay
- Château de Placard, in Mœurs-Verdey
- Fort de la Pompelle, in Reims
- Château de Réveillon, in Réveillon
- Château de Serzy-Prin, in Serzy-et-Prin

== See also ==
- List of castles in France
