= List of castles in Champagne-Ardenne =

This list of castles in Champagne-Ardenne is a list of medieval castles or château forts in the region in northern France.

== Ardennes ==
Name	Date	Condition	Image	Ownership / Access	Notes
Château de Doumely	15th century	Rebuilt		Private (open to the public)	Rebuilt from ruins in the 20th century.
Château de Hierges	9-16th century	Ruins			
Château de Landreville	13-16th century	Intact			Remodelled 16th century.
Château de Sedan	15-16th century	Restored		Public	
Château de Montcornet	11-15th century	Ruins			

== Aube ==
Name	Date	Condition	Image	Ownership / Access	Notes
Château de Bar-sur-Seine	13-15th century	Ruins			
Château de Chacenay	13th century	Ruins			
Château de Rumilly-lès-Vaudes	14-15th century	Intact		Commune of Rumilly-lès-Vaudes	

== Haute-Marne ==
Name	Date	Condition	Image	Ownership / Access	Notes
Château d'Arc-en-Barrois	18th century				
Château de Lafauche	11-14th century	Ruins			
Château de Reynel	18th century	Rebuilt			Rebuilt 1763–72, single tower survives from earlier building.
Château de Vignory	12-15th century	Ruins			

== Marne ==
Name	Date	Condition	Image	Ownership / Access	Notes
Château de Bussemont	17th century			Saint-Lumier-la-Populeuse	rebuilt 21st century
Château d'Étrepy	12th century			Étrepy	rebuilt 18th and 20th century
Château de Louvois	13th century				rebuilt 19th century
Château de Montmort	16th century	Fragment			Country house built on remains of fortified site.
Château de Vitry-la-Ville	17th century				

== See also ==
- List of castles in France
- List of châteaux in France
