= Château de Mareuil =

Château de Mareuil may refer to:

- Château de Mareuil (Dordogne)
- Château de Mareuil (Marne)
