= List of châteaux in France =

This list of châteaux in France is arranged by region. The French word château (French pronunciation: [ʃɑto]; plural: châteaux) has a wider meaning than the English castle: it includes architectural entities that are properly called palaces, mansions or vineyards in English.

Brittany	Centre-Val de Loire	Champagne-Ardenne	Corsica
Main article: List of châteaux in Brittany Château de Keriolet	Main article: List of châteaux in Centre-Val de Loire Château de Chambord	Main article: List of châteaux in Champagne-Ardenne Château de Landreville	Main article: List of castles in Corsica Citadel of Calvi
Franche-Comté	Île-de-France	Languedoc-Roussillon	Limousin
Main article: List of châteaux in Franche-Comté Château de Montbéliard	Main article: List of châteaux in the Île-de-France Palace of Versailles	Main article: List of châteaux in Languedoc-Roussillon Château de Portes	Main article: List of châteaux in Limousin Château de Jouillat
Lorraine	Midi-Pyrénées	Nord-Pas-de-Calais	Normandy
Main article: List of châteaux in Lorraine Château de Fléville	Main article: List of châteaux in the Midi-Pyrénées Château d'Estaing	Main article: List of châteaux in Nord-Pas-de-Calais Château de Villers-Châtel	Main article: List of châteaux in Normandy Château de Balleroy
Pays de la Loire	Picardy	Poitou-Charentes	Provence-Alpes-Côte d'Azur
Main article: List of châteaux in the Pays-de-la-Loire Château de Montsoreau	Main article: List of châteaux in Picardy Château de Chantilly	Main article: List of châteaux in Poitou-Charentes Château de Verteuil	Main article: List of châteaux in Provence-Alpes-Côte d'Azur Château de Barbentane
Rhône-Alpes	Overseas France		
Main article: List of châteaux in Rhône-Alpes Château de Vizille	Main article: List of châteaux in Overseas France Château Morange		

== List of former regions ==
- List of châteaux in Eure-et-Loir
- Châteaux of the Loire Valley

== See also ==
- List of castles
- List of castles in France
