= Auguste Péquégnot =

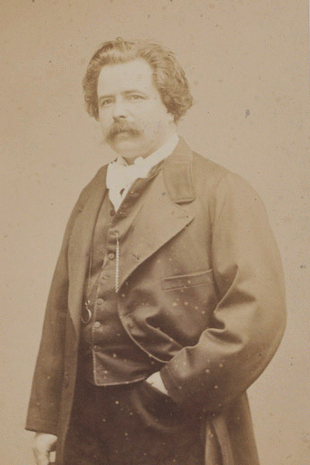
- Born: Auguste Péquégnot; October 5, 1819; Versailles, Yvelines, Kingdom of France
- Died: December 17, 1878 (aged 59); Paris, Île-de-France, French Third Republic
- Resting place: Cimetière de Montmartre, Paris, France
- Occupations: Painter; artist; engraver; professor
- Spouse: Louise Clémentine Houssard (m. 1856)

Auguste Péquégnot ([pekeɲiot]; October 5, 1819 – December 17, 1878) was a French painter, artist and engraver. His most prominent works include decorations, ornaments, vases from the renaissance to Louis XVI as well as furniture and cherubs from XVI to XVIII. Most notably his works were featured in auctions of Christie's and were also exhibited at the Metropolitan Museum of Art and the British Museum in London.

== Life ==
Péquégnot was born in Versailles to Jean Baptiste Péquégnot, an adjunct professor at École spéciale militaire de Saint-Cyr, a military academy, and Émilie Désirée (née Demarquay). He learned from his master Eugène Cicéri and began to exhibit his works at his art gallery in 1849.

In 1856, he married Louise Clémentine Houssard (1821–1905). In attendance of the wedding were Albert-Ernest Carrier-Belleuse and Augustin Challamel. He later became a professor for drawing studies at the École Commerciale on Avenue Trudaine in the 9th arrondissement of Paris.

He died aged 59 on December 17, 1878, in his residence at Rue d'Orsel in the 18th arrondissement of Paris. He was buried at Cimetière de Montmartre.

== Publications ==
- Vieilles Décorations depuis l'époque de la Renaissance jusqu'à Louis XVI
- Ornements, Vases et Décorations d'après les maîtres (1856)
- Mobilier du XVIe au XVIIIe siècle, d'après les originaux (1878)
- Leçons de perspective (1872)
