= Eugène Cicéri =

French painter

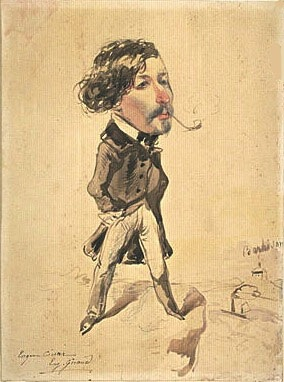
Caricature of Eugène Cicéri by Eugène Giraud

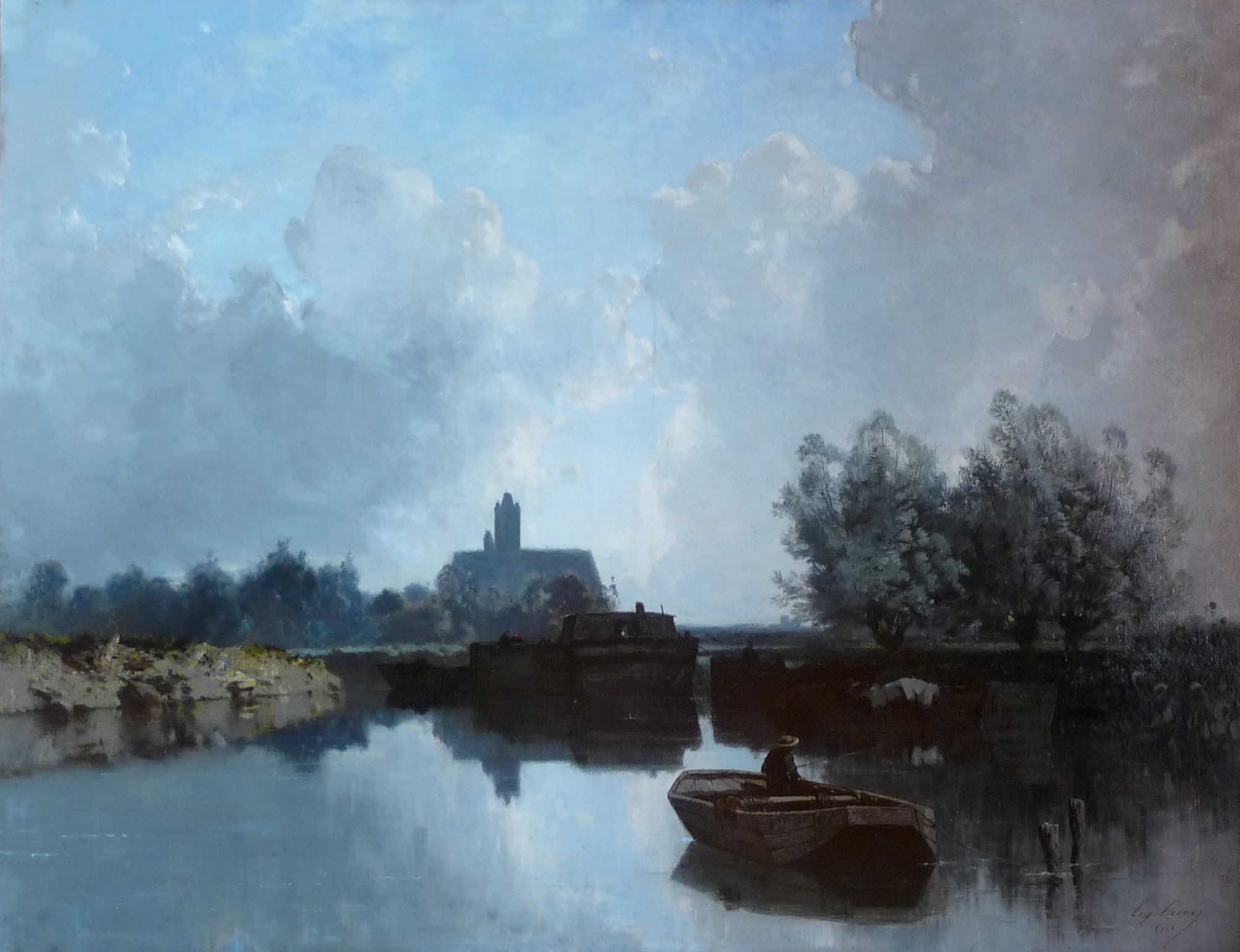
On the Banks of the Loing

Étienne Eugène Cicéri (27 January 1813 – 20 April 1890) was a French painter, illustrator, engraver and theatrical designer.

== Biography ==
He came from an artistic family. His father was the scenographer, Pierre-Luc-Charles Cicéri. He was also the grandson of the painter Jean-Baptiste Isabey, and his mother's brother was the painter Eugène Isabey.

He received his first lessons from his father and his uncle and became influenced by the Barbizon School while still young. He decided to specialize in landscapes and was one of the first artists to work in Bourron-Marlotte, where he settled in 1849. His first exhibit at the Salon came in 1851. The following year, his painting of the banks of the Loing was awarded a second-class medal.

He was also a watercolorist and published albums of lithographs based on photographs; breaking with his Romantic predecessors to present scenes realistically. One of his most popular albums was derived from trips he made to the Alps and the Pyrénées: Les Pyrénées dessinées d'après nature et lithographiées and La Suisse et la Savoie, based on photographs by Frédéric Martens taken from 1859 to 1865. Later, he was one of the artists who participated in illustrating the travel writings of Baron Taylor and Charles Nodier, collected as Voyages pittoresques et romantiques dans l'ancienne France, featuring views of Brittany. A few of his works were done in North Africa, gaining him a reputation as an Orientalist.

Like his father, he also did theatrical set designs and some decorative work; notably at the Château de Montmort.

== See also ==
- Auguste Péquégnot
