= Madame de Saint-Baslemont =

French soldier, writer, heroine of the Thirty Years' War (1607–1660)

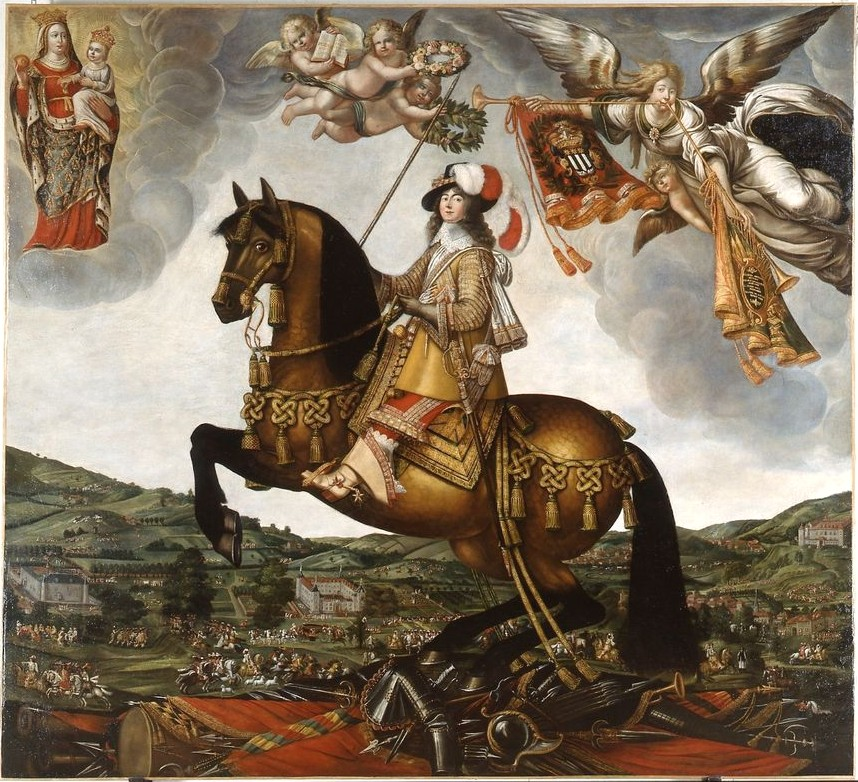
Madame de Saint-Baslemont, engraved by Balthasar Moncornet

Alberte-Barbe d'Ernécourt, Dame de Saint-Baslemont (sometimes spelled Saint-Balmon; 14 May 1607 – 22 May 1660) was a French soldier and writer. She was a woman involved in the Thirty Years' War.

== Life ==
She was born at the Château de Neuville-en-Verdunois, then in the Duchy of Bar. She was the daughter of Simon d'Ernécourt and his wife Marguerite Housse de Watronville. The family had made their fortune in the leather trade, and Alberte was sole heir after the early death of her brother Nicolas. She was brought up mostly by her father's sister, Barbe d'Ernecourt at the Château d'Étrepy. In 1623, she was given in marriage to Jean-Jacques de Haraucourt, lord of Saint-Baslemont, who was an infantry commander in the service of Charles IV, Duke of Lorraine.

The couple had at least two children:

- A son, name unknown (c. 1630–1644)
- Marie-Claude, who married Louis des Armoises, seigneur de Jaulny et de Commercy

Alberte remained at Neuville-en-Verdunois when her husband was away serving the Duke of Lorraine, but needed to defend her property against French, Swedish and Croatian soldiers who were roaming the countryside. She dressed in men's clothing, assuming the persona of the "chevalier de Saint-Baslemont" (supposedly her brother-in-law), and is said to have participated in hand-to-hand combat, adopting military tactics she had learned from her husband. She also took responsibility for the protection of the shrine of Notre-Dame-de-Benoite-Vaux, with its statue of the Virgin Mary. She created a fighting force from among her tenants, and succeeded in maintaining some order within her family's territory. As a result, her lands attracted many incomers from other areas whose own homes were threatened or destroyed.

Early in the war, her husband Jean-Jacques was taken prisoner, but was ransomed. However, in 1644, the same year their son died, she received the news that Jean-Jacques had been killed in battle at Merode in present-day Germany. At around the same time, Anne of Austria became regent of France, and forbade the practice of women dressing in men's clothing, and Madame de Saint-Baslemont was obliged to discontinue her military activities. The war having ended, Henri de La Ferté-Senneterre, who became governor of Lorraine in the 1650s, took possession of her home, forcing her to enter a convent, where she died aged 53.

Three plays are attributed to her, and she is said to have also written religious verse. Only one play has survived, Les Jumeaux martyrs (1650), a tragedy about two Roman twin brothers who are Christian converts.

An equestrian portrait of Madame de Saint-Baslemont, by her contemporary Claude Deruet, is held at the regional museum in the Palace of the Dukes of Lorraine at Nancy, France.
