= Neuville-en-Verdunois =

- Commune
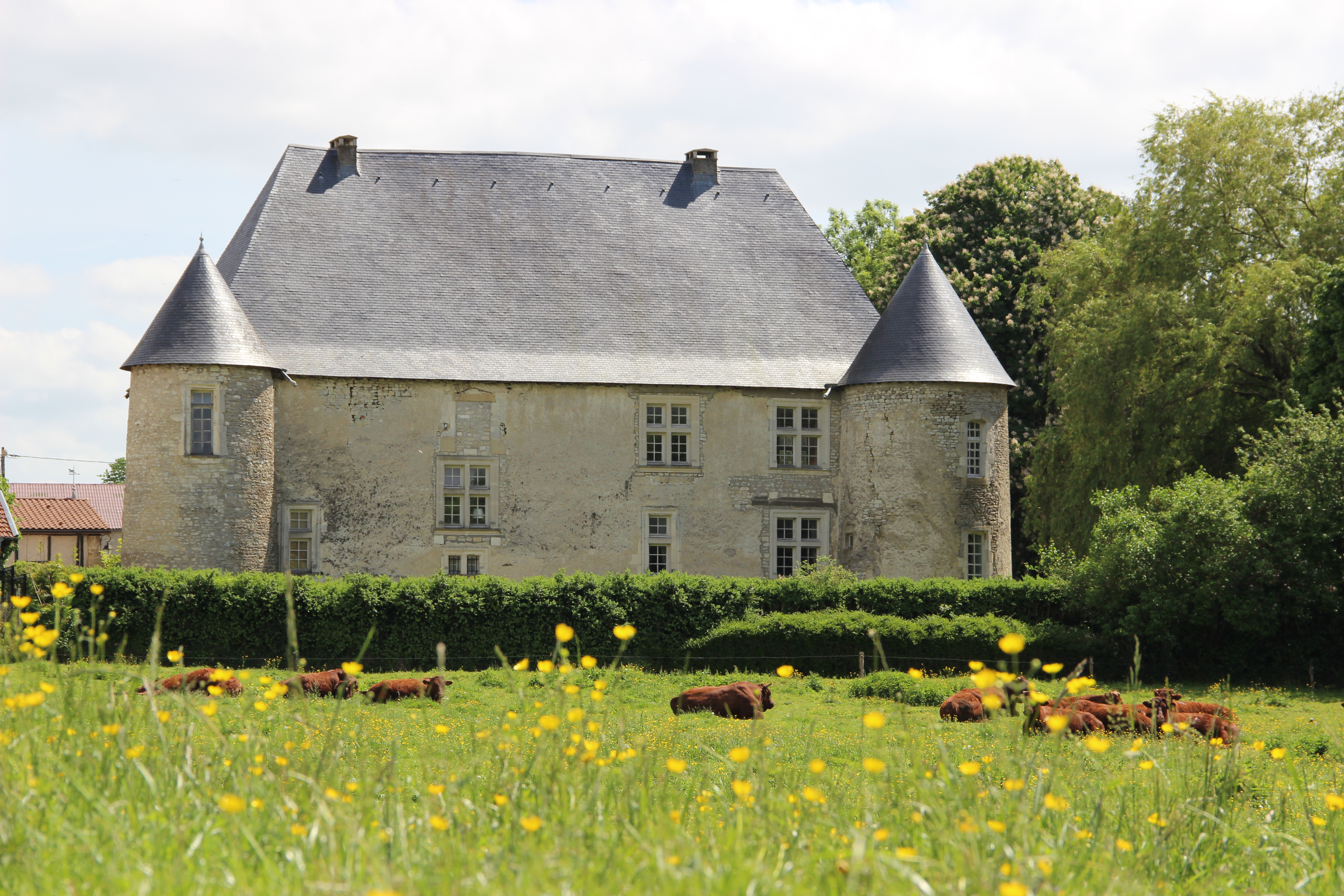
- The chateau in Neuville-en-Verdunois

- Coat of arms
- Location of Neuville-en-Verdunois
- Location within France Location within Grand Est
- Coordinates: 48°56′41″N 5°17′59″E
- Country: France
- Region: Grand Est
- Department: Meuse
- Arrondissement: Commercy
- Canton: Dieue-sur-Meuse
- Intercommunality: CC de l'Aire à l'Argonne

Government
  - Mayor (2020–2026): Sophie Charriot
- Area^{1}: 13.44 km^{2} (5.19 sq mi)
- Elevation: 275 m (902 ft)
- Highest elevation: 325 m (1,066 ft)
- Lowest elevation: 238 m (781 ft)
- Population (2023): 48
  - Density: 3.6/km^{2} (9.2/sq mi)
- Time zone: UTC+01:00 (CET)
  - Summer (DST): UTC+02:00 (CEST)
- INSEE/Postal code: 55380 /55260
- ^{1} French Land Register data, which excludes lakes, ponds, glaciers > 1 km^{2} (0.386 sq mi or 247 acres) and river estuaries.

Neuville-en-Verdunois (French pronunciation: [nøvil ɑ̃ vɛʁdynwa]) is a commune in the Meuse department in Grand Est in north-eastern France.

== Notable places ==
- The Château de Neuville-en-Verdunois, a castle from the 16th century, designated a monument historique

== Notable people ==
- Madame de Saint-Baslemont (1607–1660), soldier and writer, heroine of the Thirty Years' War

== See also ==
- Communes of the Meuse department
