= Mœurs-Verdey =

- Commune
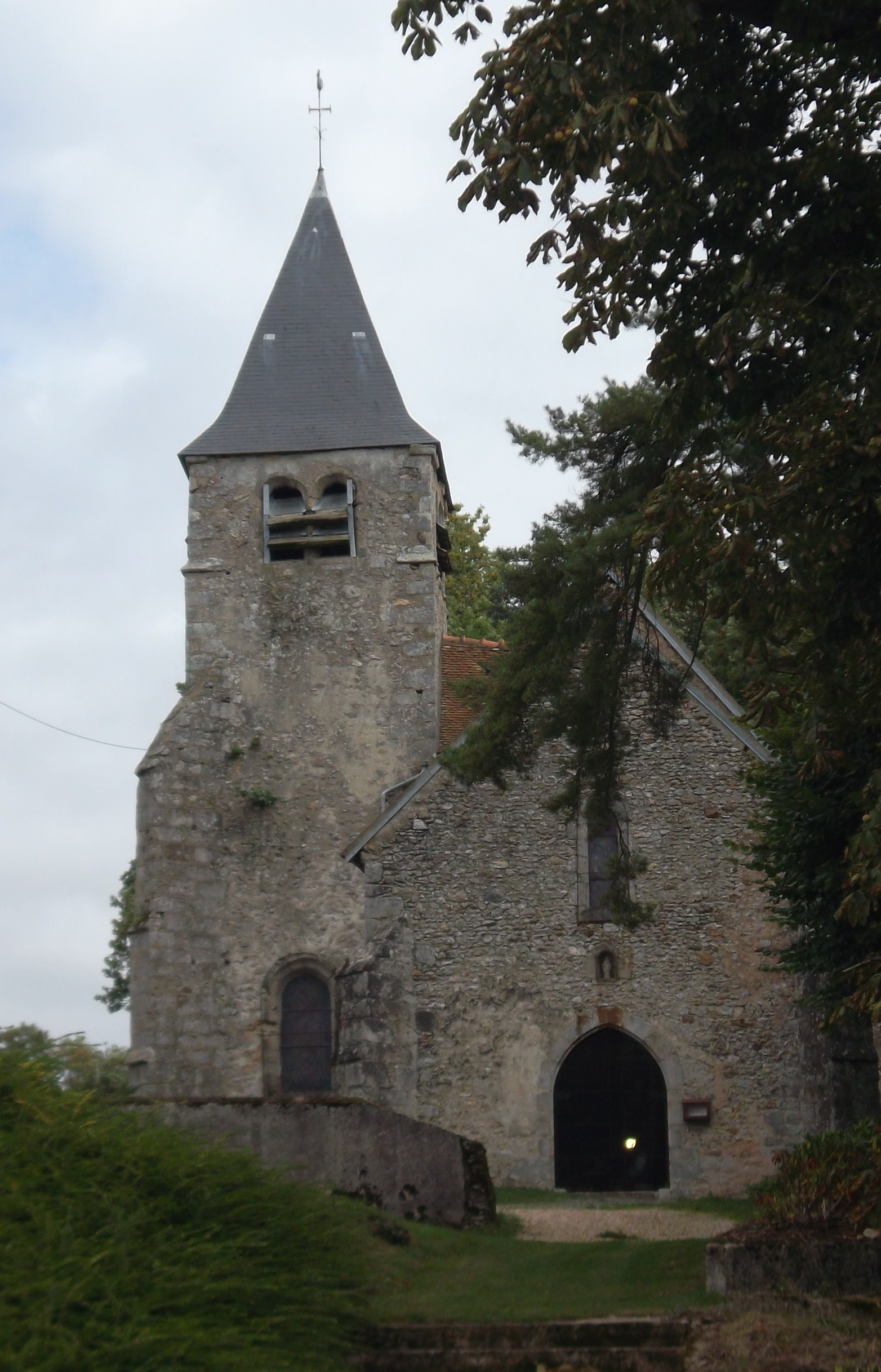
- The church in Mœurs
- Location of Mœurs-Verdey
- Location within France Location within Grand Est
- Coordinates: 48°43′41″N 3°40′44″E
- Country: France
- Region: Grand Est
- Department: Marne
- Arrondissement: Épernay
- Canton: Sézanne-Brie et Champagne

Government
  - Mayor (2020–2026): Claude Pouzier
- Area^{1}: 13.18 km^{2} (5.09 sq mi)
- Elevation: 207 m (679 ft)
- Population (2023): 317
  - Density: 24.1/km^{2} (62.3/sq mi)
- Time zone: UTC+01:00 (CET)
  - Summer (DST): UTC+02:00 (CEST)
- INSEE/Postal code: 51369 /51120
- ^{1} French Land Register data, which excludes lakes, ponds, glaciers > 1 km^{2} (0.386 sq mi or 247 acres) and river estuaries.

Mœurs-Verdey (French pronunciation: [mœʁ vɛʁdɛ]) is a commune in the Marne department in north-eastern France.

== See also ==
- Communes of the Marne department
