= Rue d'Orsel =

Street in Paris, France

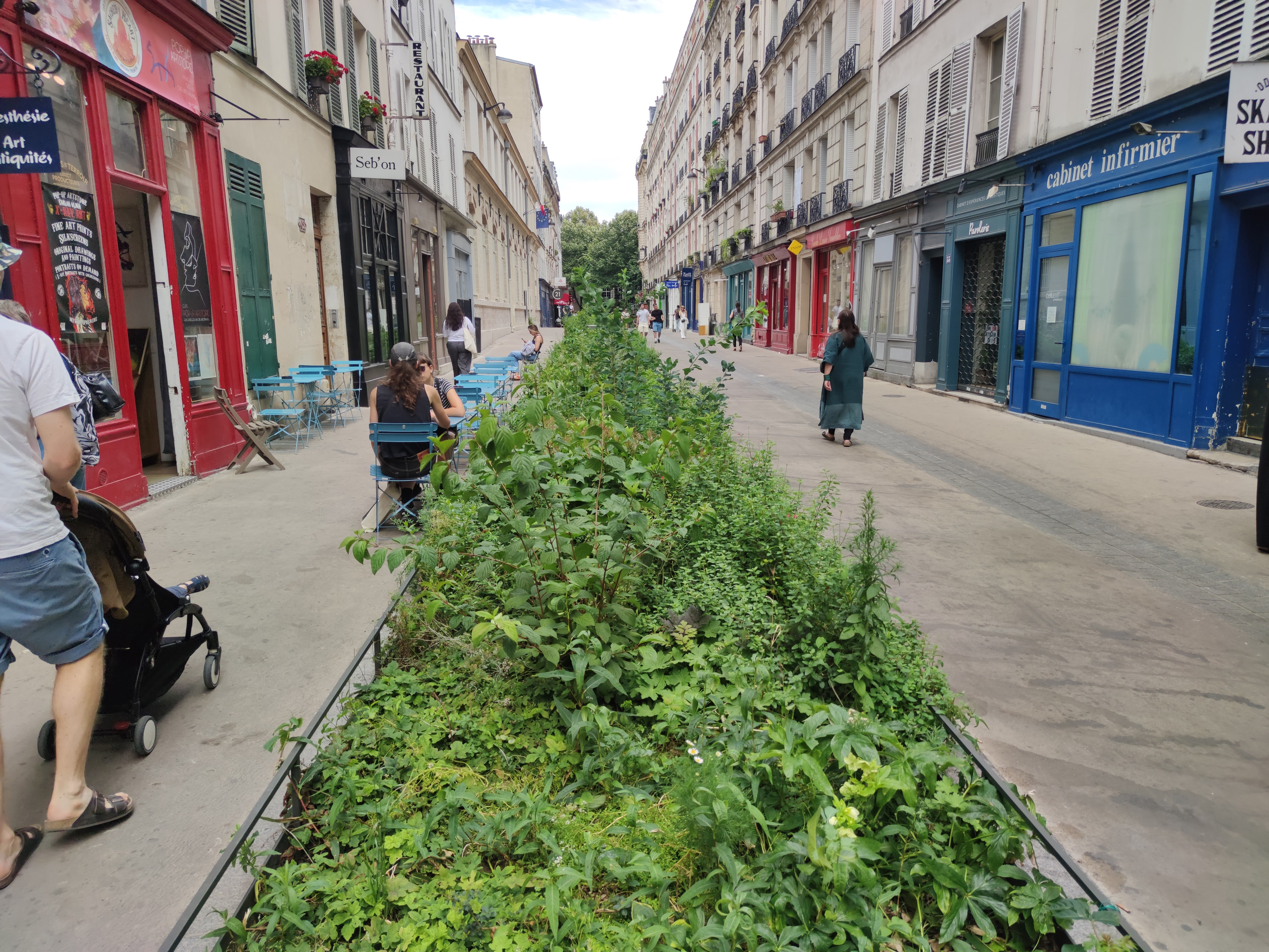

- Location within Paris
- Length: 545 m (1,788 ft)
- Width: 10 m (33 ft)
- Arrondissement: 18th
- Quarter: Clignancourt
- Coordinates: 48°53′02″N 2°20′40″E
- From: Rue de Clignancourt
- To: Rue des Martyrs

Construction
- Completed: before 1672
- Denomination: 1867

The Rue d'Orsel is a street in the 18th arrondissement of Paris. It was previously known as the Rue des Acacias. It is in the neighborhood surrounding Montmartre, the butte (hill) where the Basilique du Sacré-Cœur is located.
