= Vignory =

- Commune
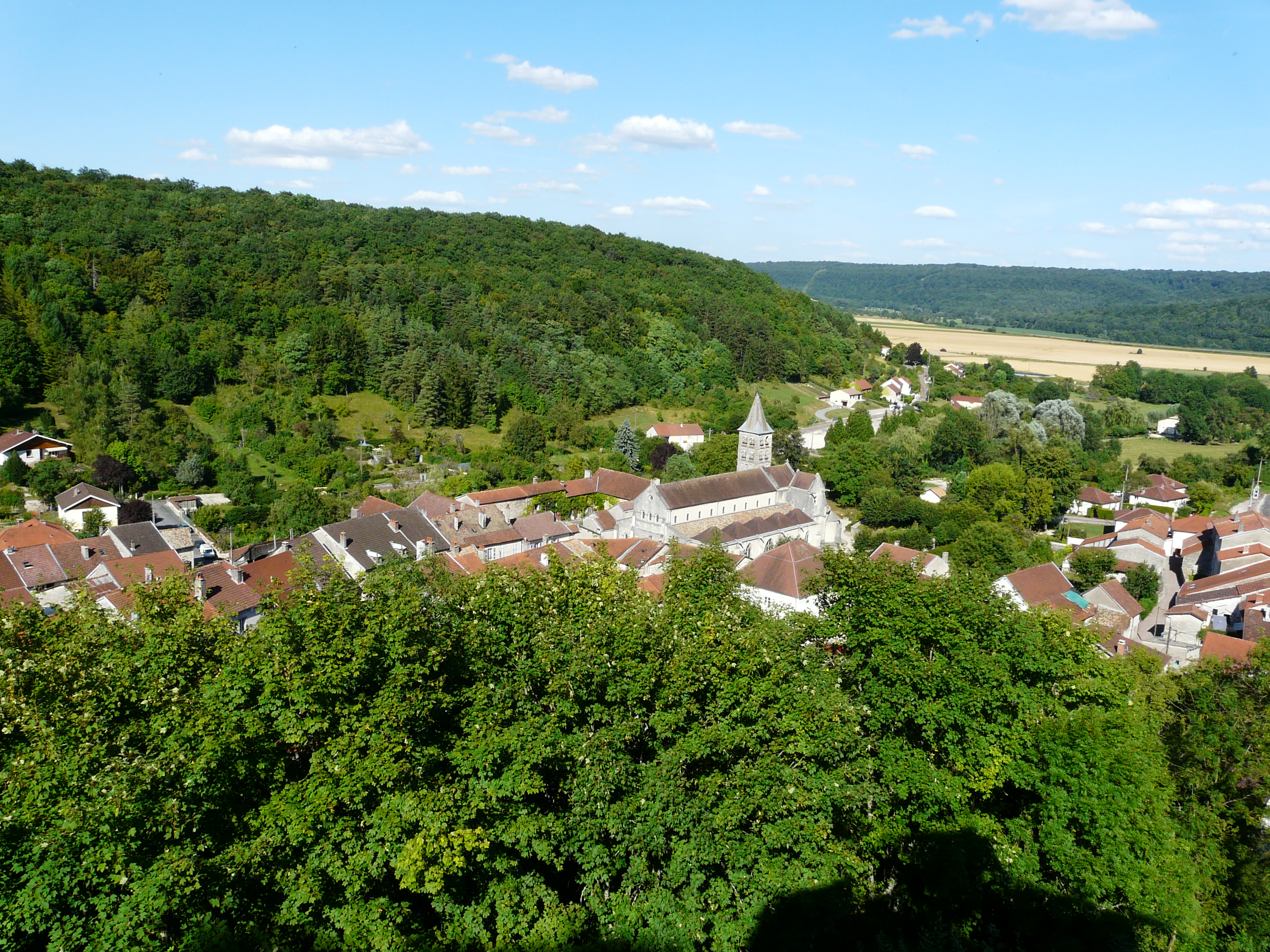
- A general view of Vignory

- Coat of arms
- Location of Vignory
- Location within France Location within Grand Est
- Coordinates: 48°16′44″N 5°06′14″E
- Country: France
- Region: Grand Est
- Department: Haute-Marne
- Arrondissement: Chaumont
- Canton: Bologne
- Intercommunality: CA Chaumont

Government
  - Mayor (2020–2026): Etienne Marasi
- Area^{1}: 19.46 km^{2} (7.51 sq mi)
- Elevation: 243 m (797 ft)
- Highest elevation: 389 m (1,276 ft)
- Lowest elevation: 217 m (712 ft)
- Population (2023): 215
  - Density: 11.0/km^{2} (28.6/sq mi)
- Time zone: UTC+01:00 (CET)
  - Summer (DST): UTC+02:00 (CEST)
- INSEE/Postal code: 52524 /52320
- ^{1} French Land Register data, which excludes lakes, ponds, glaciers > 1 km^{2} (0.386 sq mi or 247 acres) and river estuaries.

Vignory (French pronunciation: [viɲɔʁi]) is a commune in the Haute-Marne département in north-eastern France.

== Sites and monuments ==
- Château de Vignory - castle built at the start of the 12th century by Guy de Vignory; classified as a monument historique in 1989.
- Église Saint-Étienne de Vignory - church whose construction began in 1032; classified as a monument historique in 1846.

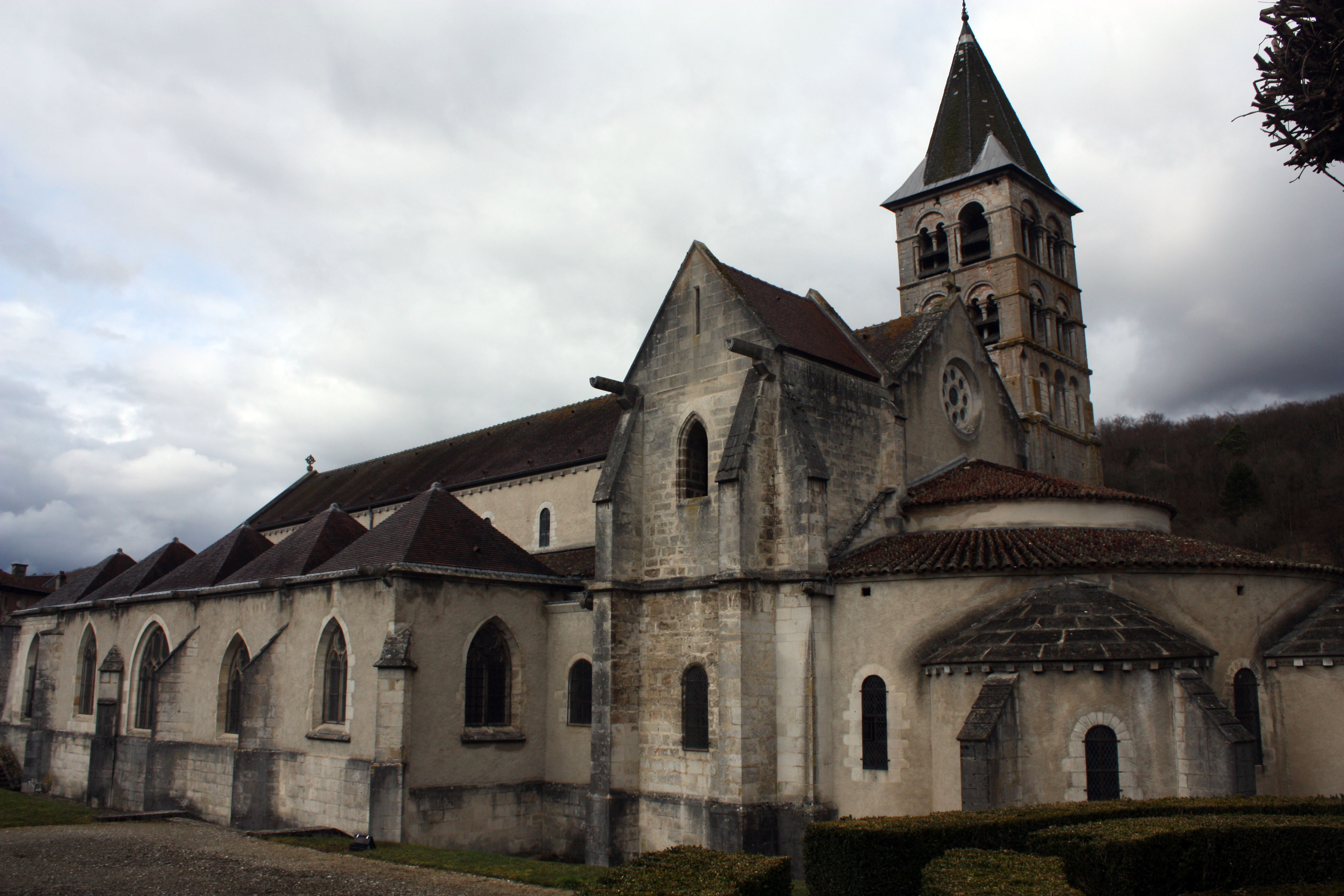
Église Saint-Étienne de Vignory

- Picturesque streets
- Museum and medieval-inspired garden
- 16th and 18th century houses
- Lavoir - constructed 1832

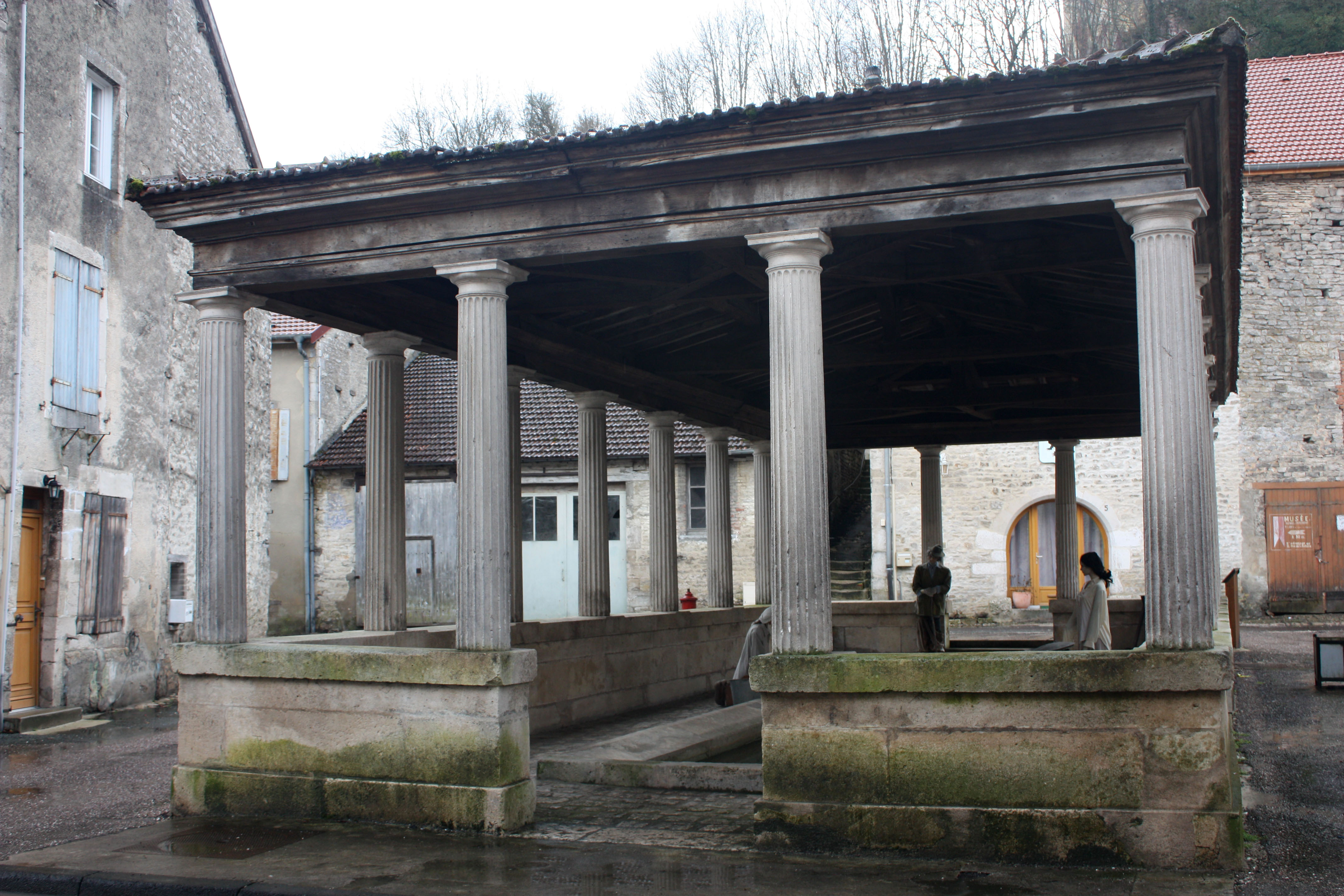
Lavoir

== See also ==
- Communes of the Haute-Marne department – French communes' list
