= List of châteaux in Overseas France =

This is a list of châteaux in Overseas France.

== Guadeloupe ==
- Fort Fleur d'épée, Gosier
- Fort Napoléon des Saintes, on the island Terre-de-Haut

== Guiana ==
- Fort Cépérou, Cayenne
- Diamond Fort, Remire-Montjoly
- Fort Trio, Matoury

== Martinique ==
- Château Dubuc, at La Trinité (ruined)
- Fort Saint-Pierre, at Saint-Pierre
- Fort Saint-Louis, at Fort-de-France

== La Réunion ==
- Château du Gol, at Saint-Louis.
- Château Morange, at Saint-Denis.

== See also ==
- List of castles in France
