= Château de Mareuil (Dordogne) =

Chateau located in Dordogne, France

Coordinates: 45°27′14″N 0°27′04″E

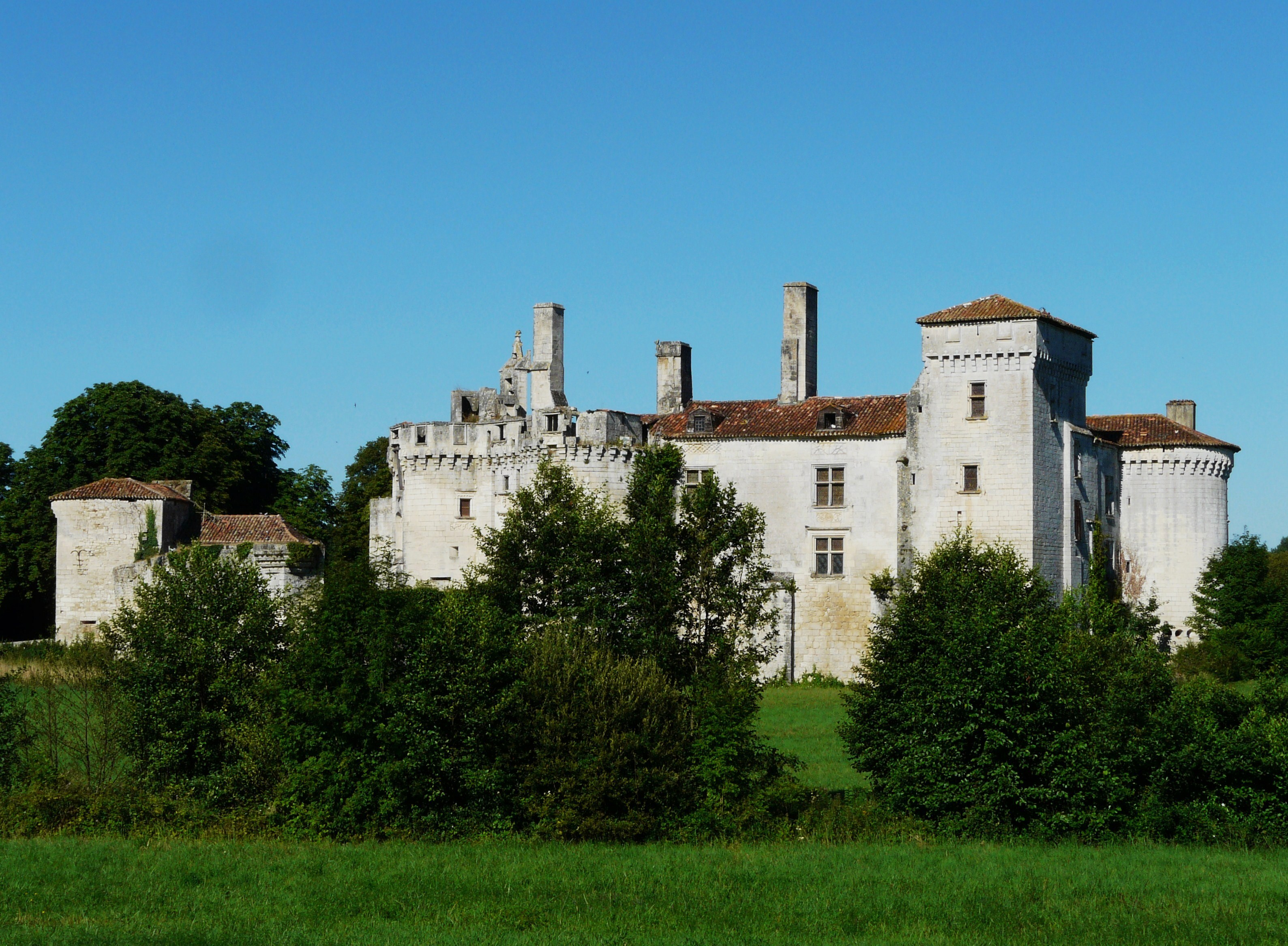
Château de Mareuil

The Château de Mareuil is a château in Mareuil-sur-Belle, Dordogne, Nouvelle-Aquitaine, France.
