= Montmort-Lucy =

- Commune
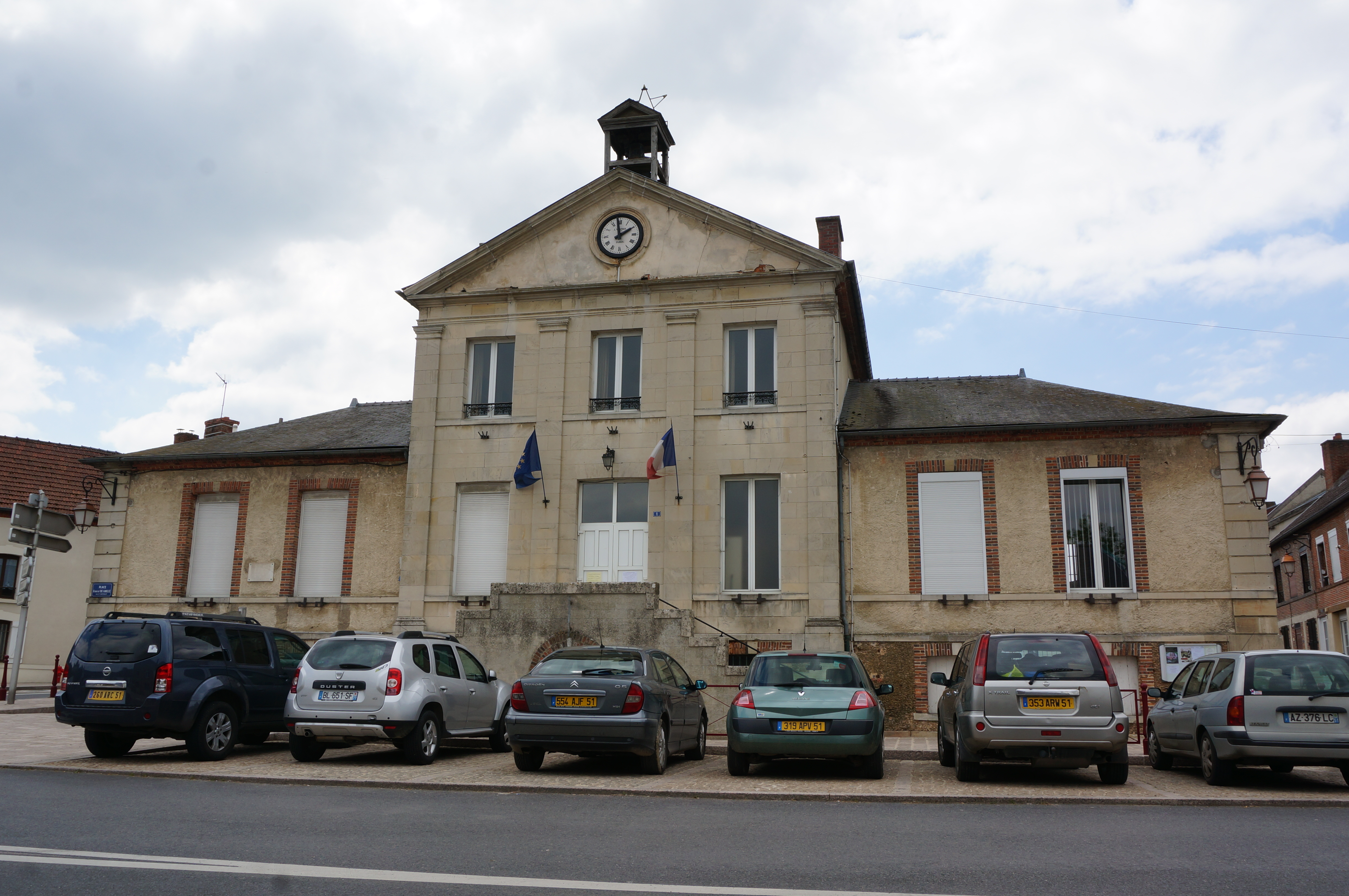
- The town hall in Montmort-Lucy

- Coat of arms
- Location of Montmort-Lucy
- Location within France Location within Grand Est
- Coordinates: 48°55′31″N 3°48′34″E
- Country: France
- Region: Grand Est
- Department: Marne
- Arrondissement: Épernay
- Canton: Dormans-Paysages de Champagne
- Intercommunality: Paysages de la Champagne

Government
  - Mayor (2020–2026): Alain Friquot
- Area^{1}: 29.17 km^{2} (11.26 sq mi)
- Elevation: 206 m (676 ft)
- Population (2023): 656
  - Density: 22.5/km^{2} (58.2/sq mi)
- Time zone: UTC+01:00 (CET)
  - Summer (DST): UTC+02:00 (CEST)
- INSEE/Postal code: 51381 /51270
- ^{1} French Land Register data, which excludes lakes, ponds, glaciers > 1 km^{2} (0.386 sq mi or 247 acres) and river estuaries.

Montmort-Lucy (French pronunciation: [mɔ̃mɔʁ lysi]) is a commune in the Marne department in north-eastern France.

== See also ==
- Communes of the Marne department
- Château de Montmort

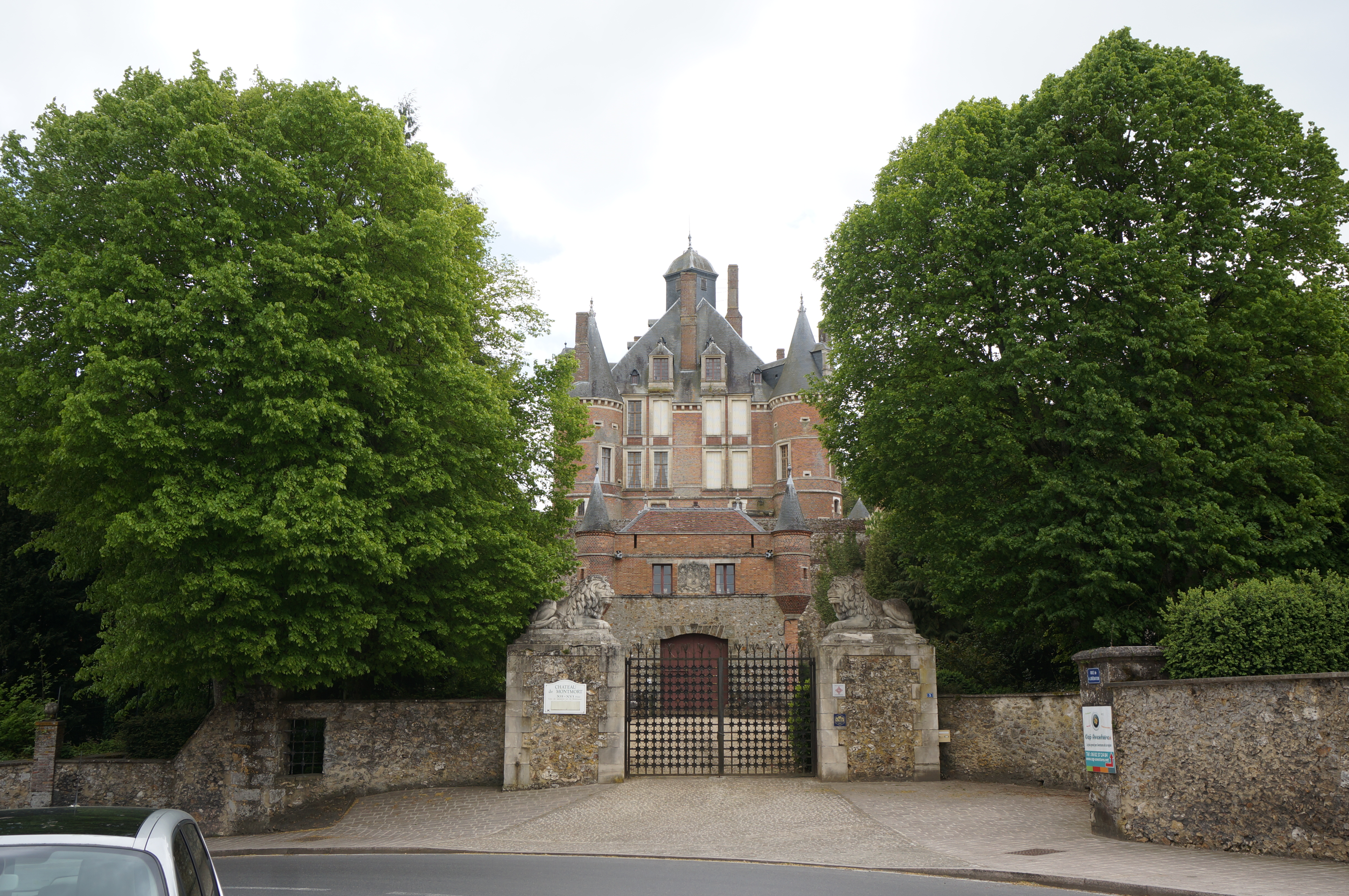
Castle
