= Doumely Castle =

Castle in Doumely-Bégny, France

Coordinates: 49°37′48″N 4°18′21″E

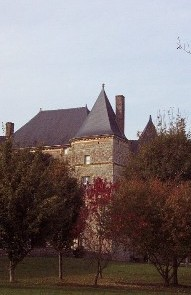
Château de Doumely seen from the grounds

Doumely Castle (French: Château de Doumely) is a 15th-century fortified castle that dominates the countryside of Porcien, situated in the commune of Doumely-Bégny in the Ardennes département of France.

The castle was fully restored at the end of the 20th century by its current owner, who had acquired the castle in complete ruins. The structure bears witness to the transformations that successive occupants have made to the castle: filling of the ditches, openings in the façade, destruction of internal levels, etc.

The Château de Doumely has been listed as a monument historique by the French Ministry of Culture since 1984.

== Architecture ==
The castle is characterised by its four teardrop-shaped defensive towers, that once overlooked a moat filled with water.

The association Les Amis du Château de Doumely (Friends of the Château de Doumely) organises tours to the monument and gives seminars on the topic of life in the middle-ages.

== See also ==
- List of castles in France
