= Château de Mareuil (Marne) =

Coordinates: 49.0452°N 4.0378°E

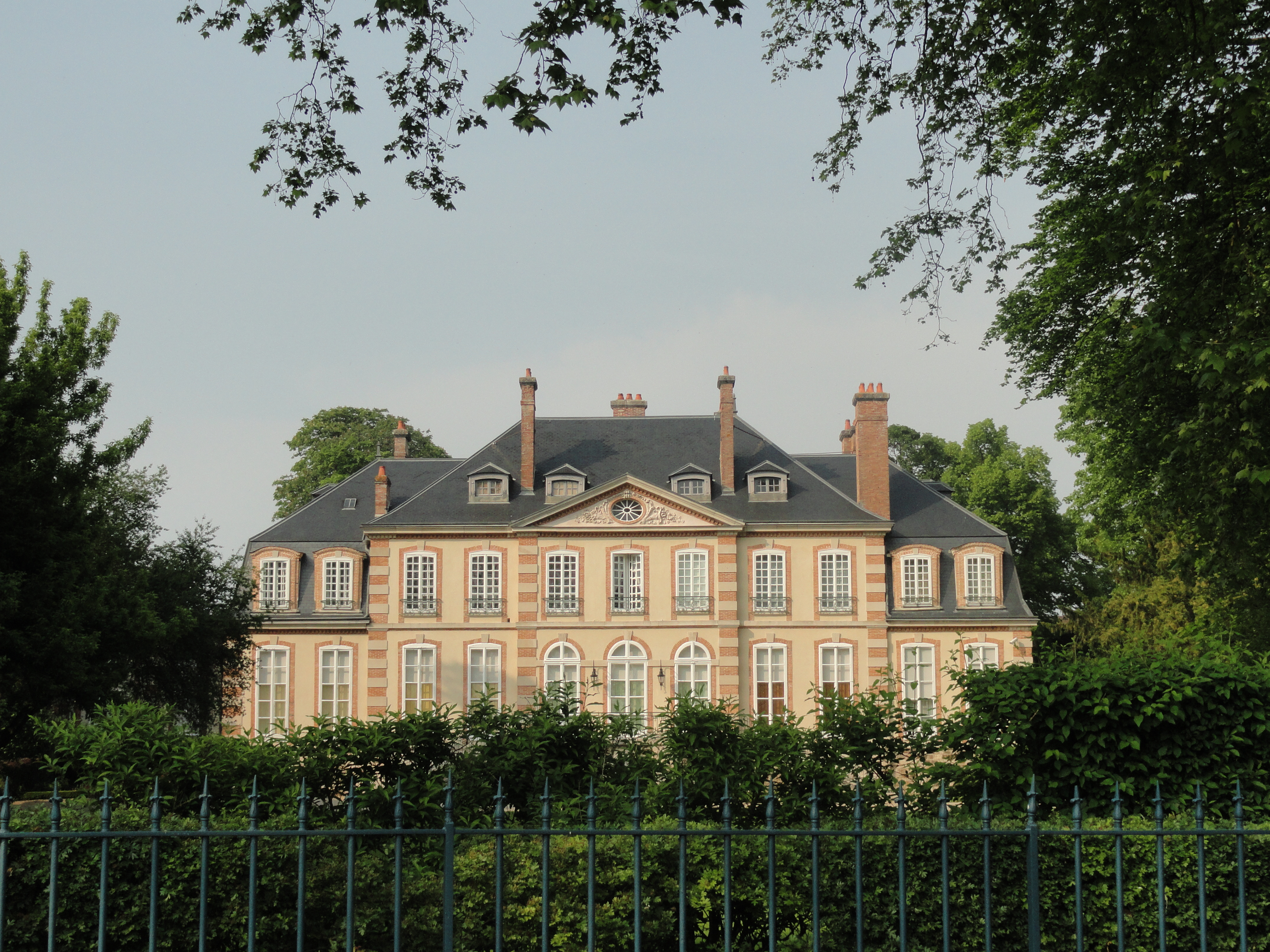

The Château de Mareuil is a château in Mareuil-sur-Ay, Marne, France.

== Gallery ==
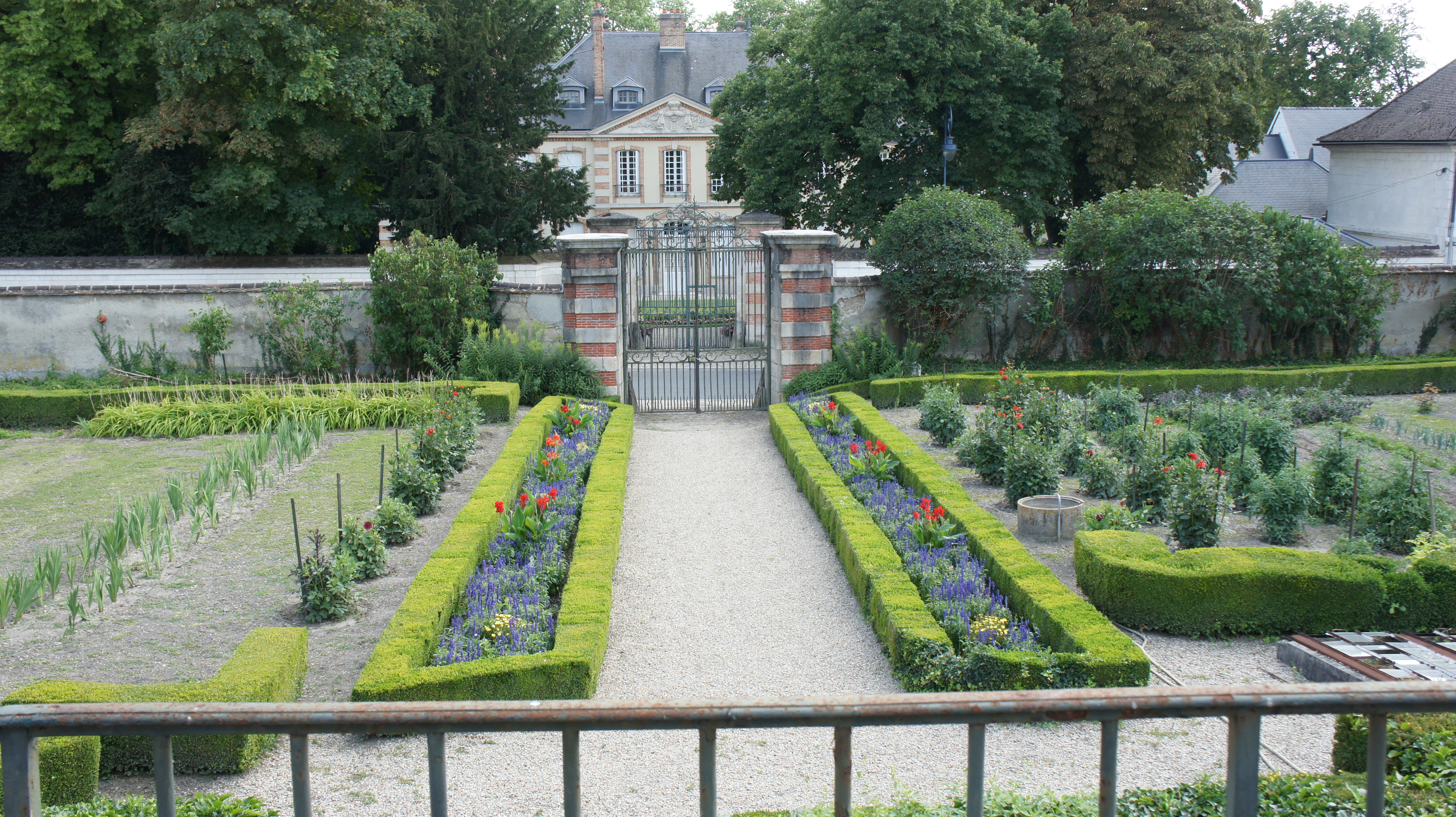
First garden

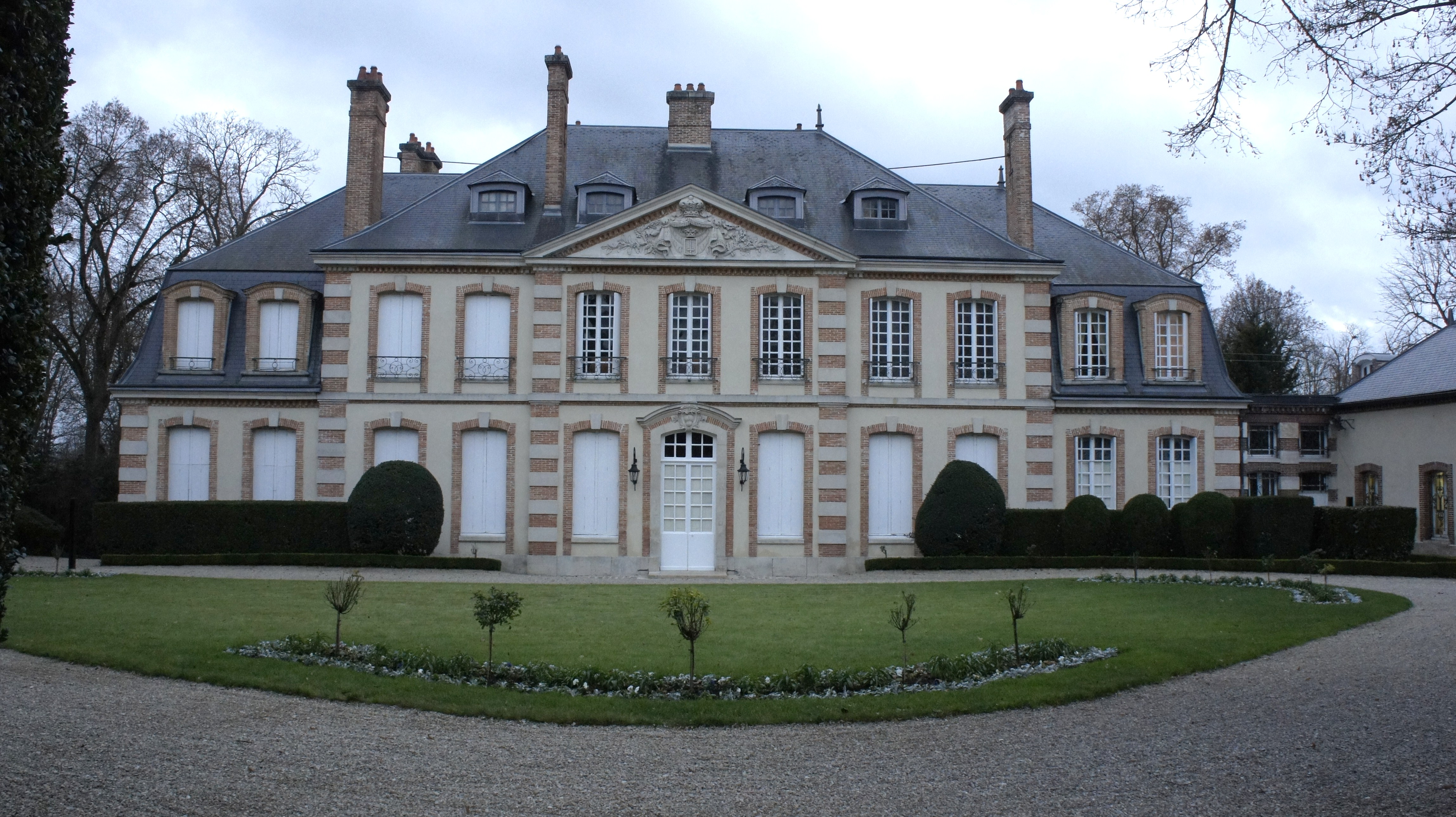
Façade

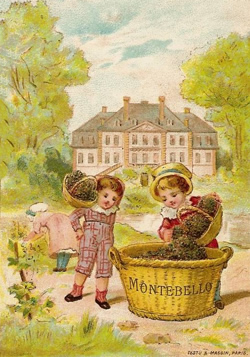
Advertisement

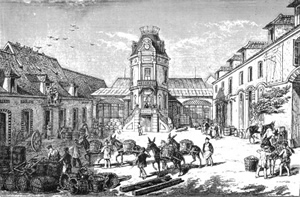
Illustration of champagne harvest
