= Landreville Castle =

Castle in Bayonville, France

Coordinates: 49°22′43″N 5°0′32″E

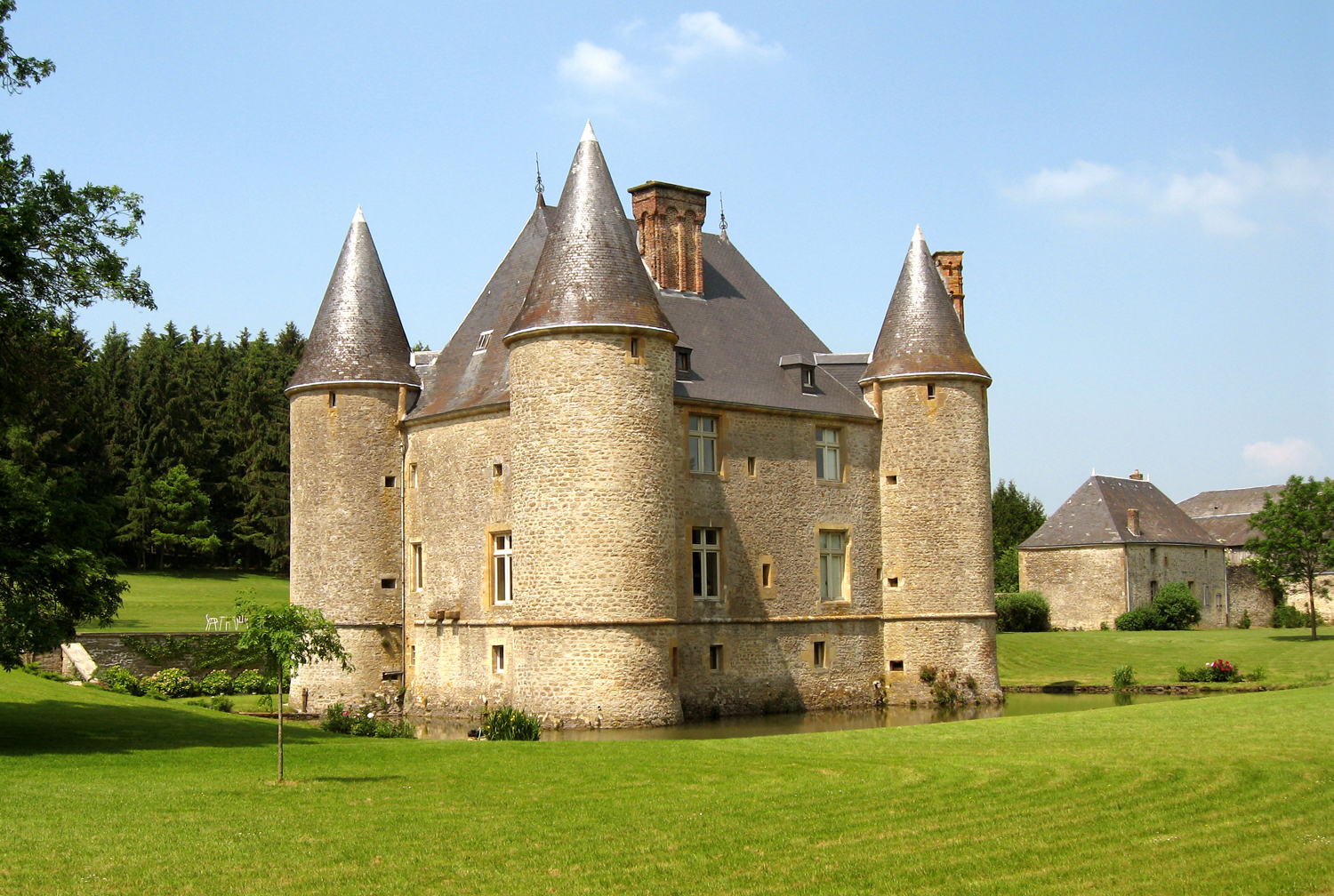
Southwest face of the Château de Landreville in May 2007

Landreville Castle (French: Château de Landreville) is a castle situated in the commune of Bayonville in the Ardennes département of France.

Within the territory of a 12th-century châtelain, the castle was built in the early 13th century and remodelled in the middle of the 16th century. The Château de Landreville, situated in the Argonne Ardennaise region, is a rectangular "maison forte" (strong house) flanked by four cylindrical towers with 'pepper-pot' roofs, surrounded by water-filled moats, with a six hectares park, stables and two pavilions. The castle has been classified as a monument historique by the French Ministry of Culture since 2006.

It is a rare example of a still practically intact manorial residence of the pre-Renaissance Ardennes region.

In 800 years of history it has witnessed the lives of many families, including the Landrevilles, Grandprés, Chennerys, Beauvais, Maillarts, Meixmorons. The portrait of Claude François de Maillart, lord and marquis de Landreville, was painted by Nicolas de Largillière around 1735.

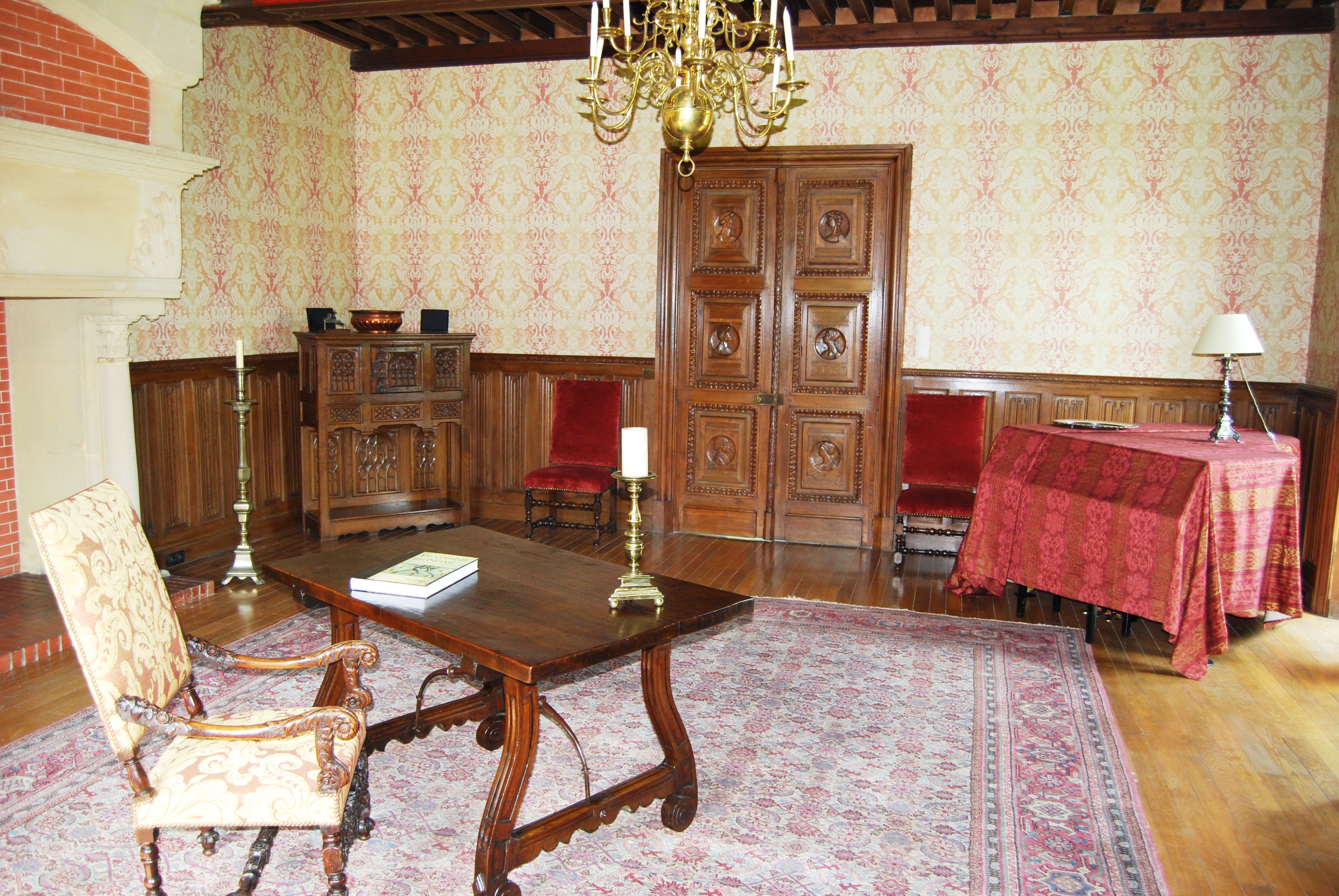
Saloon Louis XIII of Landreville Castle

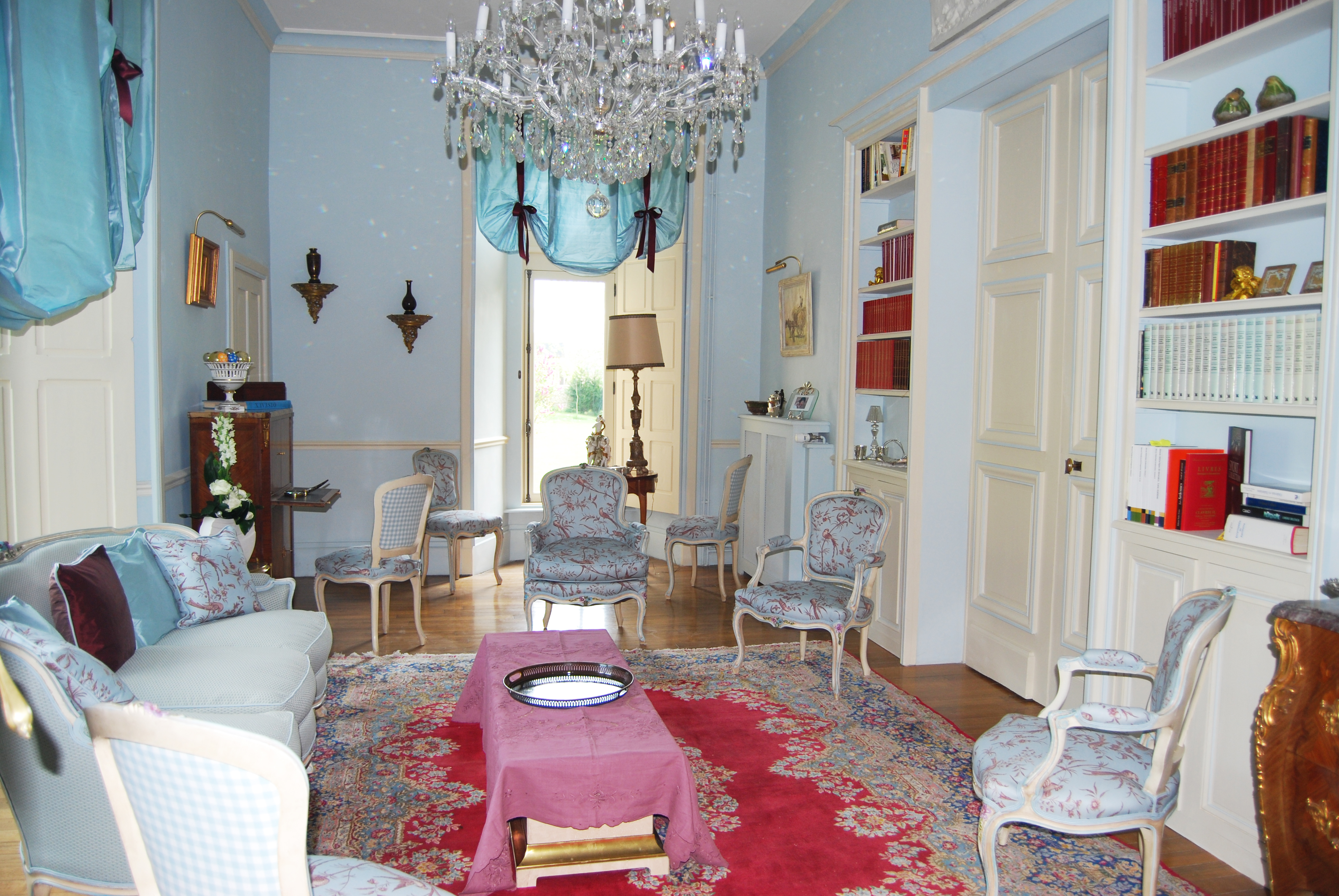
Boudoir of Landreville Castle

== Description ==
Construction of the current building dates from the middle of the 16th century, the date of 1567 being seen on one of the chimneys. The building plan is typical since the 15th century, with a rectangular home confined by four round towers. The moat remains visible on three sides.

On three floors, rectangular fire holes are let into the towers to provide protection for the four sides. They still have the support bars that made it possible to stabilise the weapon.

The main door is decorated with embossed designs and statuettes of caryatids, characteristic of the French Renaissance after 1550.

The lower stage is entirely vaulted in stone. In the kitchen, the vaulting is supported by a single pillar in the centre, as was usual. One of the towers contains a spiral staircase. The two floors each include French-style ceilings and chimneys. The two chimneys on the first floor were partly modified in the 19th century.

The buildings which surround the castle are all more recent. The manager's house carries the year 1773. A symmetrical building is an addition from the end of the 19th century. At that time, the buildings located at the south-western entry to the castle were destroyed. The castle is testimony to the military architecture of 16th-century Ardennes.

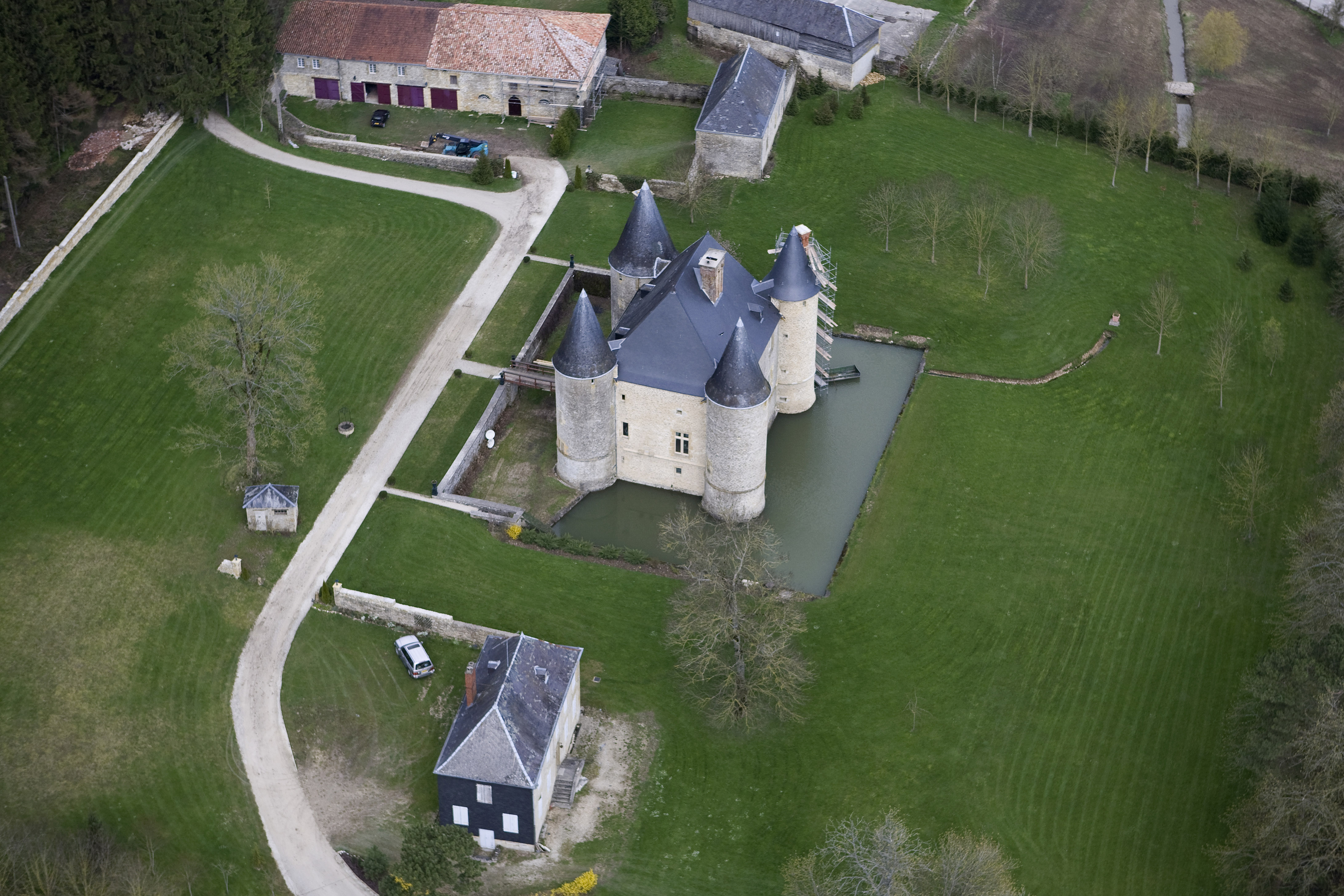
Landreville Castle - southwest view in 2010

== See also ==
- List of castles in France
