= Château de Vignory =

Ruined castle in Vignory, France

Coordinates: 48°16′36″N 5°06′05″E

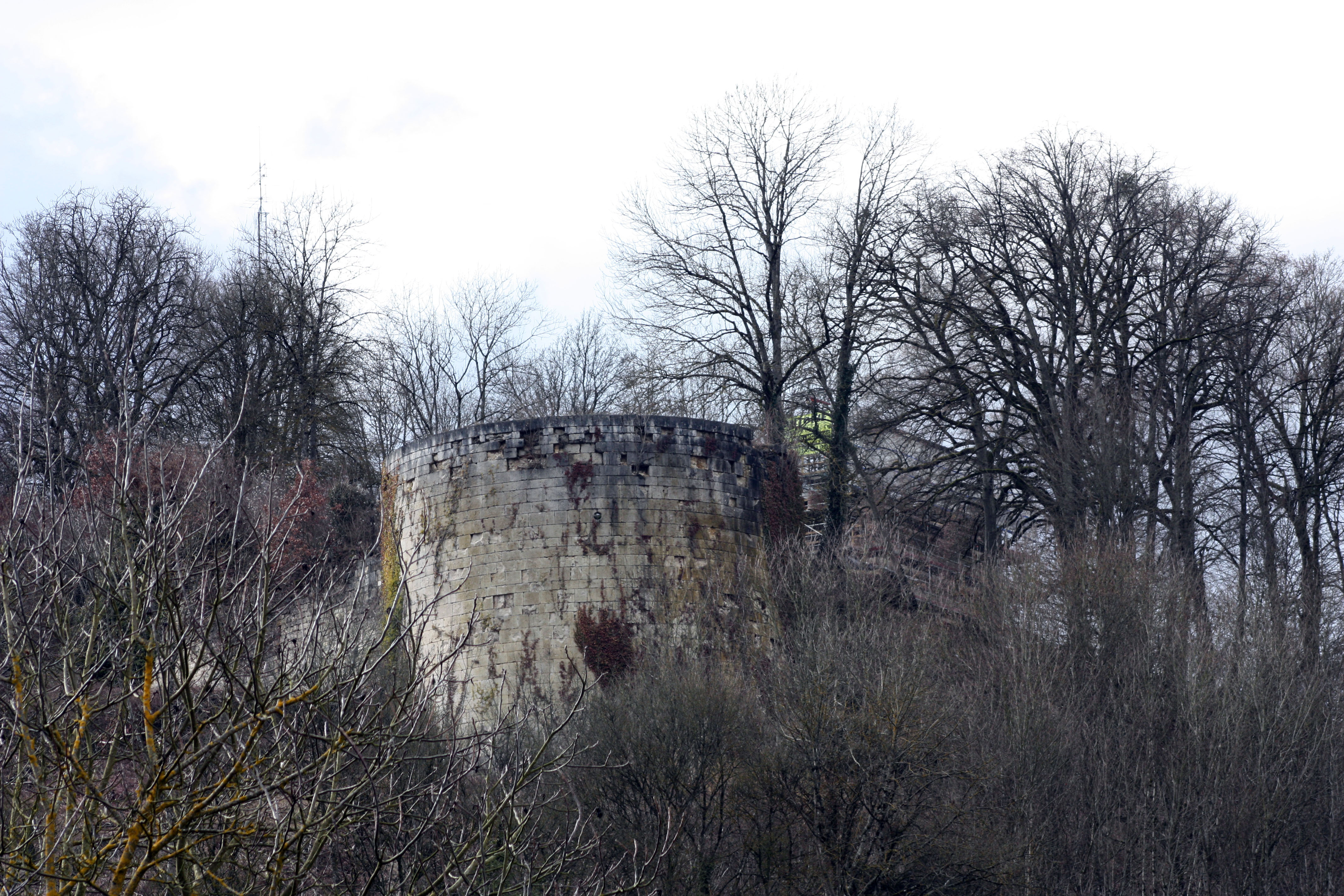
An artillery tower at the Château de Vignory

The Château de Vignory is a ruined castle in the commune of Vignory in the Haute-Marne département of France, 23 km north of Chaumont.

The keep, the Well Tower and the curtain wall have been listed since 1989 as a monument historique by the French Ministry of Culture. The castle is the property of the commune.

== History ==
The Château de Vignory was the residence of the lords of Vignory. It was built at the start of the 11th century, but no elements of this period exist today.

The first written record of a castle is from the years 1050-1052. It had originally been a castrum, held by the first lord of Vignory, Guy.

== Architecture ==
The monuments visible today are more recent: the keep (middle of the 12th century) was used by the lord to receive his subjects; the tour au Puits (Well Tower, middle of 15th century) served to defend the entry to the village from Chaumont; various ramparts and defensive towers on the Valnoise side; the large tour Canonnière (Artillery tower, end of 15th century).

The side facing the valley was completed by a Renaissance gateway emblazoned with coats of arms leading to the lower hall, probably at the time of Henri de Lenoncourt, for whom Vignory was made into a barony in 1555. Of the castle's defensive walls, only segments of the curtain wall remain and a large artillery tower dominating the village and the valley, the so-called tour du Puits (well tower), reduced in height in 1846. Two other towers of the defensive walls, demolished during the 19th century, had cannon emplacements, attesting to the importance of adapting the castle to artillery. The logis, to which one of these towers was attached, was still roofed in 1840, but has now completely disappeared. The tower collapsed on 7 June 1913.

Renovation work on the tower as well as cleaning of the ramparts on the Valnoise side was undertaken between 2009 and 2011.

Other parts which have been destroyed or have disappeared through lack of repair are the chapel, the manor house, dovecote, the two entrance gates and their drawbridges. Models showing the original form of the castle are exhibited on the site.

== Protection ==
The keep, the Well Tower and the surviving curtain walls were classified as a monument historique by the Ministry of Culture in 1989. The cannon tower was added in 2022.

== See also ==
- List of castles in France
