= Château d'Étrepy =

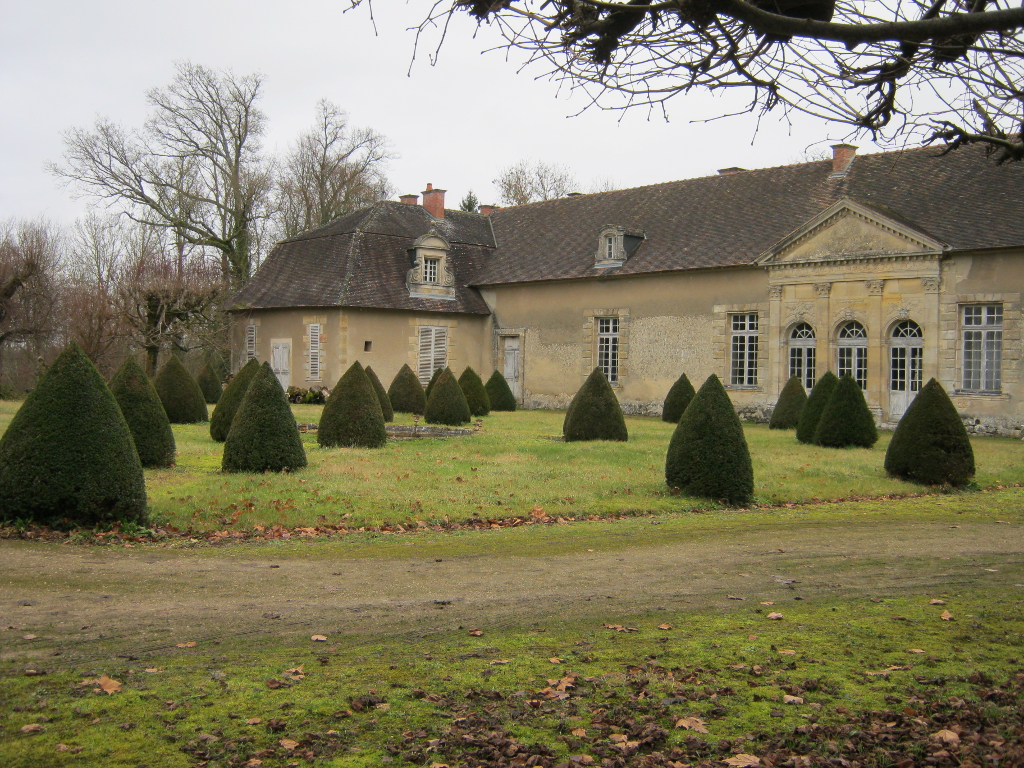

- Location within France

General information
- Type: Château
- Location: Étrepy, Marne, France
- Coordinates: 48.767317°N 4.806294°E
- Construction started: 12th century
- Completed: 20th century

The Château d'Étrepy is a château in Étrepy, Marne, France.

== History ==
Madame de Saint-Baslemont (1607-1660), was educated at the Château, until the age of 14, by her paternal aunt Barbe d'Ernécourt, wife of Warin de Nievenheim, Baron d'Etrepy.
