= Étrepy =

- Commune
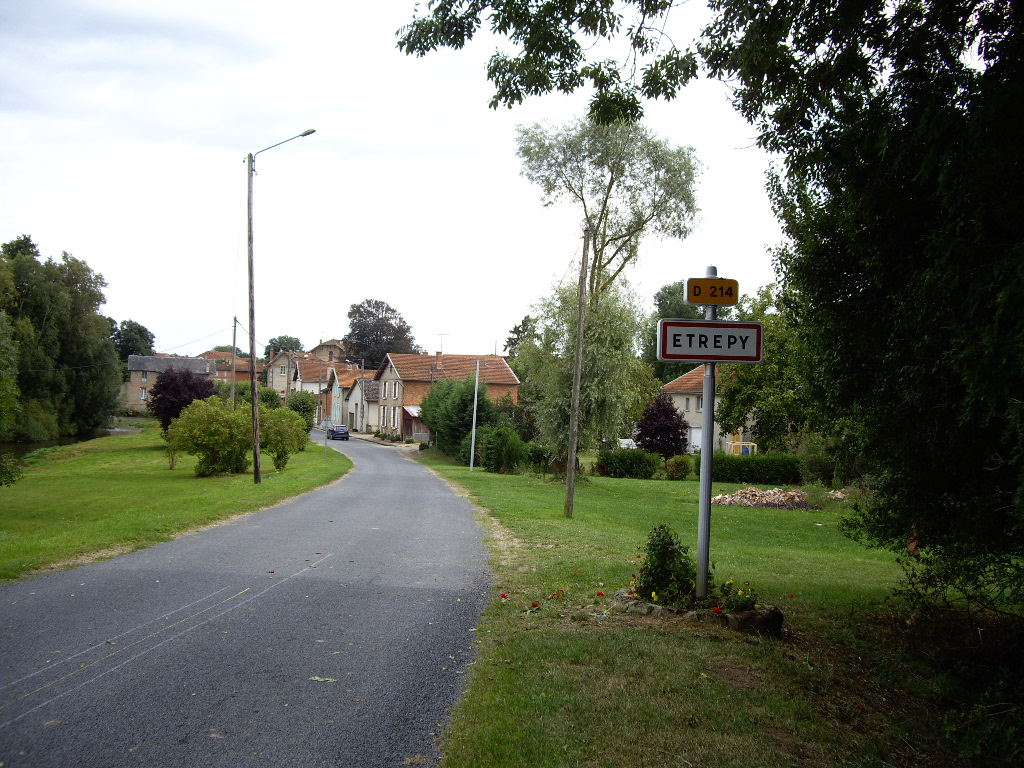
- A view within Étrepy
- Location of Étrepy
- Location within France Location within Grand Est
- Coordinates: 48°45′57″N 4°48′24″E
- Country: France
- Region: Grand Est
- Department: Marne
- Arrondissement: Vitry-le-François
- Canton: Sermaize-les-Bains
- Intercommunality: Côtes de Champagne et Val de Saulx

Government
  - Mayor (2020–2026): Pierre Le Guillou
- Area^{1}: 7.63 km^{2} (2.95 sq mi)
- Elevation: 130 m (430 ft)
- Population (2023): 112
  - Density: 14.7/km^{2} (38.0/sq mi)
- Time zone: UTC+01:00 (CET)
  - Summer (DST): UTC+02:00 (CEST)
- INSEE/Postal code: 51240 /51340
- ^{1} French Land Register data, which excludes lakes, ponds, glaciers > 1 km^{2} (0.386 sq mi or 247 acres) and river estuaries.

Étrepy (French pronunciation: [etʁəpi]) is a commune in the Marne department in north-eastern France.

== See also ==
- Communes of the Marne department
- Château d'Étrepy
