= Bayonville =

- Commune
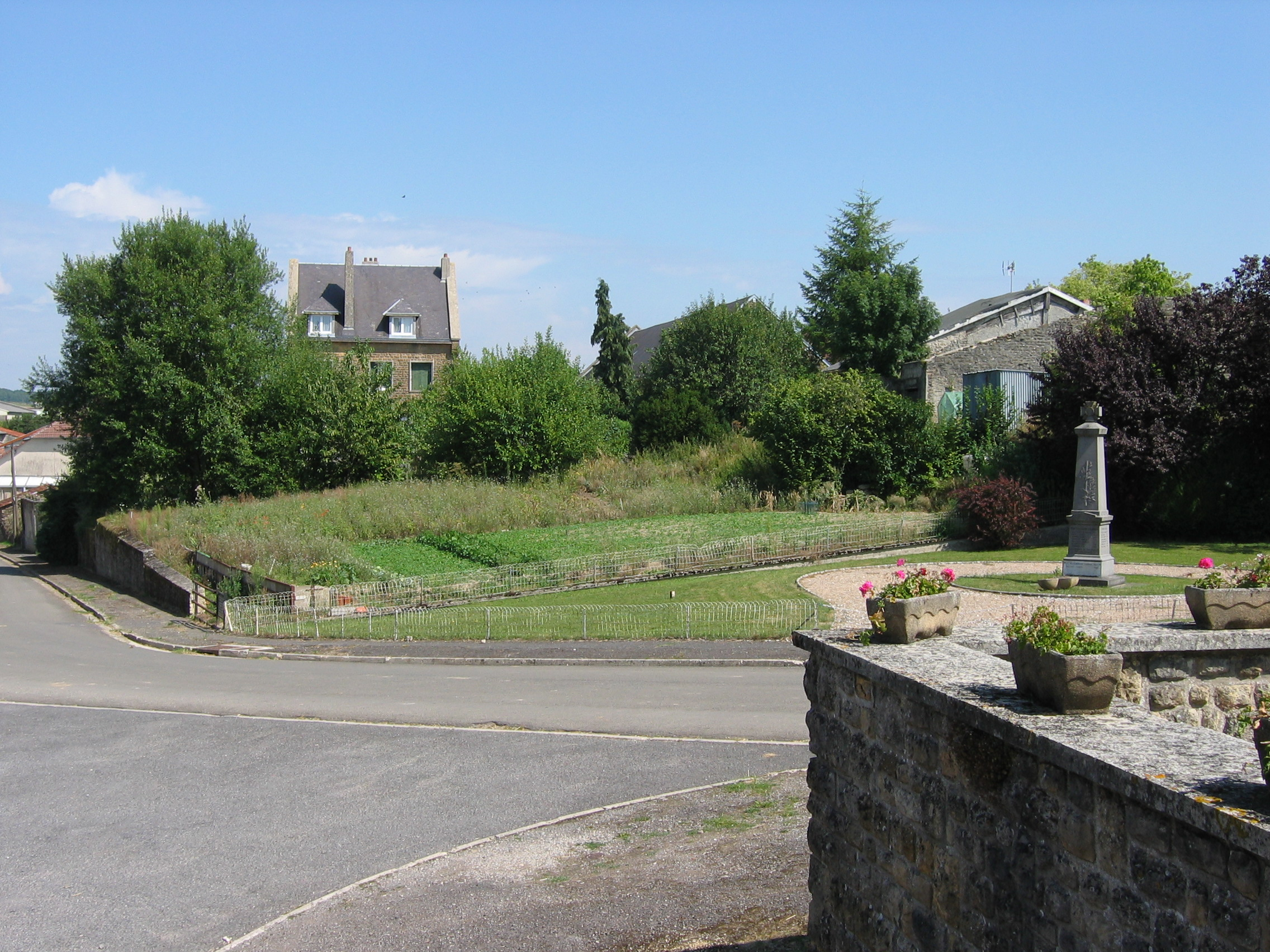
- Bayonville village
- Location of Bayonville
- Location within France Location within Grand Est
- Coordinates: 49°23′48″N 5°00′23″E
- Country: France
- Region: Grand Est
- Department: Ardennes
- Arrondissement: Vouziers
- Canton: Vouziers
- Intercommunality: Argonne Ardennaise

Government
  - Mayor (2020–2026): Philippe Etienne
- Area^{1}: 16.19 km^{2} (6.25 sq mi)
- Elevation: 245 m (804 ft)
- Highest elevation: 305 m (1,001 ft)
- Lowest elevation: 181 m (594 ft)
- Population (2023): 65
  - Density: 4.0/km^{2} (10/sq mi)
- Time zone: UTC+01:00 (CET)
  - Summer (DST): UTC+02:00 (CEST)
- INSEE/Postal code: 08052 /08240
- ^{1} French Land Register data, which excludes lakes, ponds, glaciers > 1 km^{2} (0.386 sq mi or 247 acres) and river estuaries.

Bayonville is a commune in the Ardennes department in the Grand Est region of northern France.

== Geography ==
Bayonville is located some 40 km south by south-east of Charleville-Mézières and 15 km south-west of Stenay. Access to the commune is by the D12 road from Buzancy in the north-west which passes through the centre of the commune and the village and continues south-east to Bantheville - changing to the D15 at the departmental border. Another D15 comes from Tailly in the north-east and goes south through the commune and the village continuing to Imécourt in the south-west. The D55 goes south from the village to Landres-et-Saint-Georges. Apart from the village there are the hamlets of Chennery and Landreville. The commune is mostly farmland with some forest in the east and north.

The Agron river flows through the south-east of the commune from north-east to south-west where it continues a meandering path to join the Aire south-west of Saint-Juvin. The Ruisseau du Wassieux flows south-west through the commune and continues south-west to join the Agron near Imécourt. The Furba rises in the north-east of the commune and flows south-west to join the Agron at Landreville.

== Toponymy ==
Bayonville was attested in the Latinised form Baionis villa in 960. The derivation is undoubtedly from the "Domain of Baio", a Germanic personal name (cf. Bayonvillers)

Bayonville appears as Bayonville on the 1750 Cassini Map and the same on the 1790 version.

== History ==
In 1828 the communes of Chennery and Landreville were merged with the commune of Bayonville. In 1864 Landreville had 80 inhabitants.

== Administration ==
List of Successive Mayors

From	To	Name
1995	2026	Philippe Etienne

== Demography ==
The inhabitants of the commune are known as Bayonvillois or Bayonvilloises in French.

Historical population

Year	Pop.	±% p.a.
1793	360	—
1821	364	+0.04%
1846	521	+1.44%
1872	453	−0.54%
1901	337	−1.01%
1926	234	−1.45%
1946	200	−0.78%
1962	223	+0.68%
1968	200	−1.80%

Year	Pop.	±% p.a.
1975	171	−2.21%
1982	142	−2.62%
1990	127	−1.39%
1999	106	−1.99%
2007	116	+1.13%
2012	100	−2.92%
2017	99	−0.20%
2023	65	−6.77%

Source: EHESS and INSEE

== Culture and heritage ==
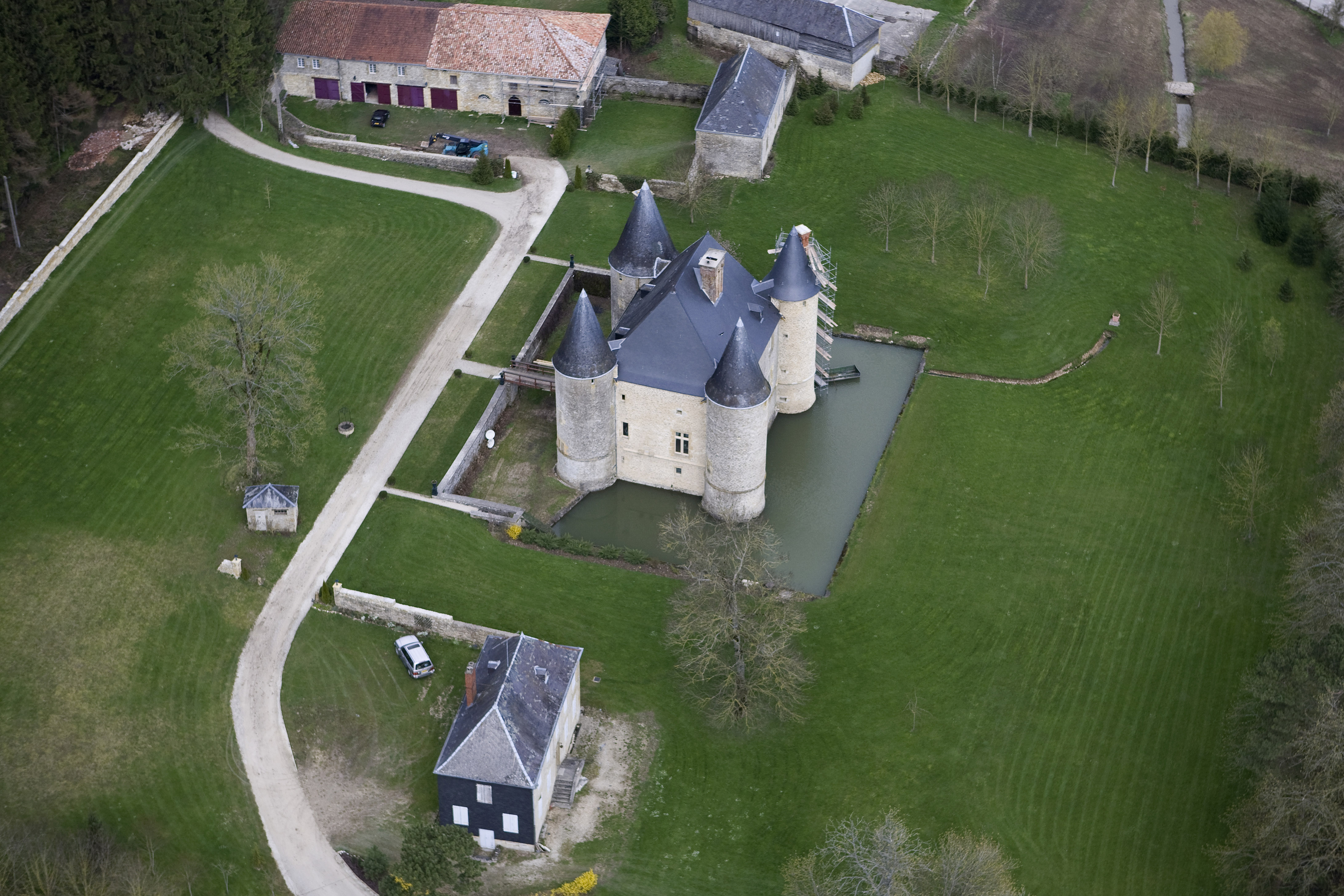
The Chateau of Landreville

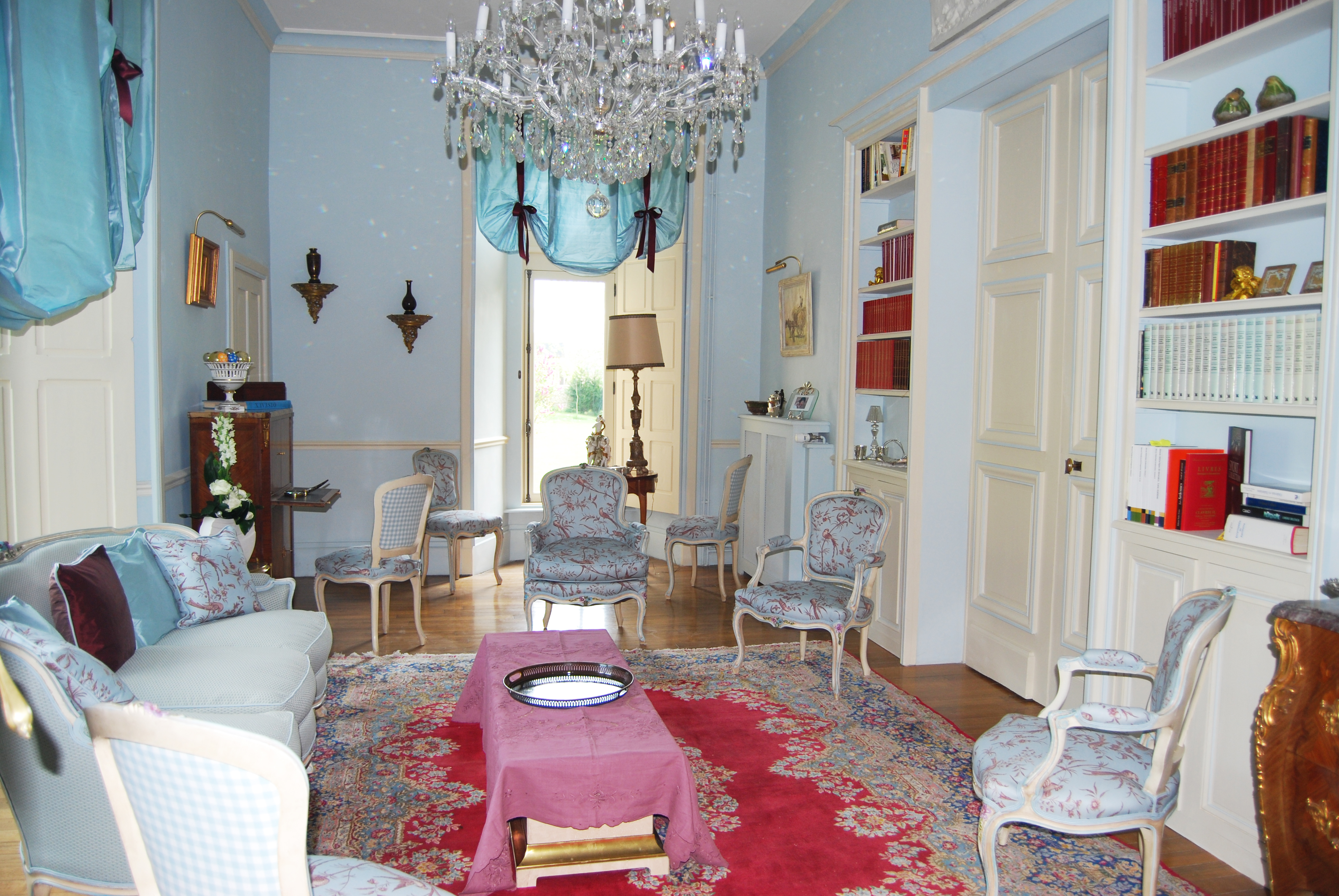
Boudoir in the Chateau

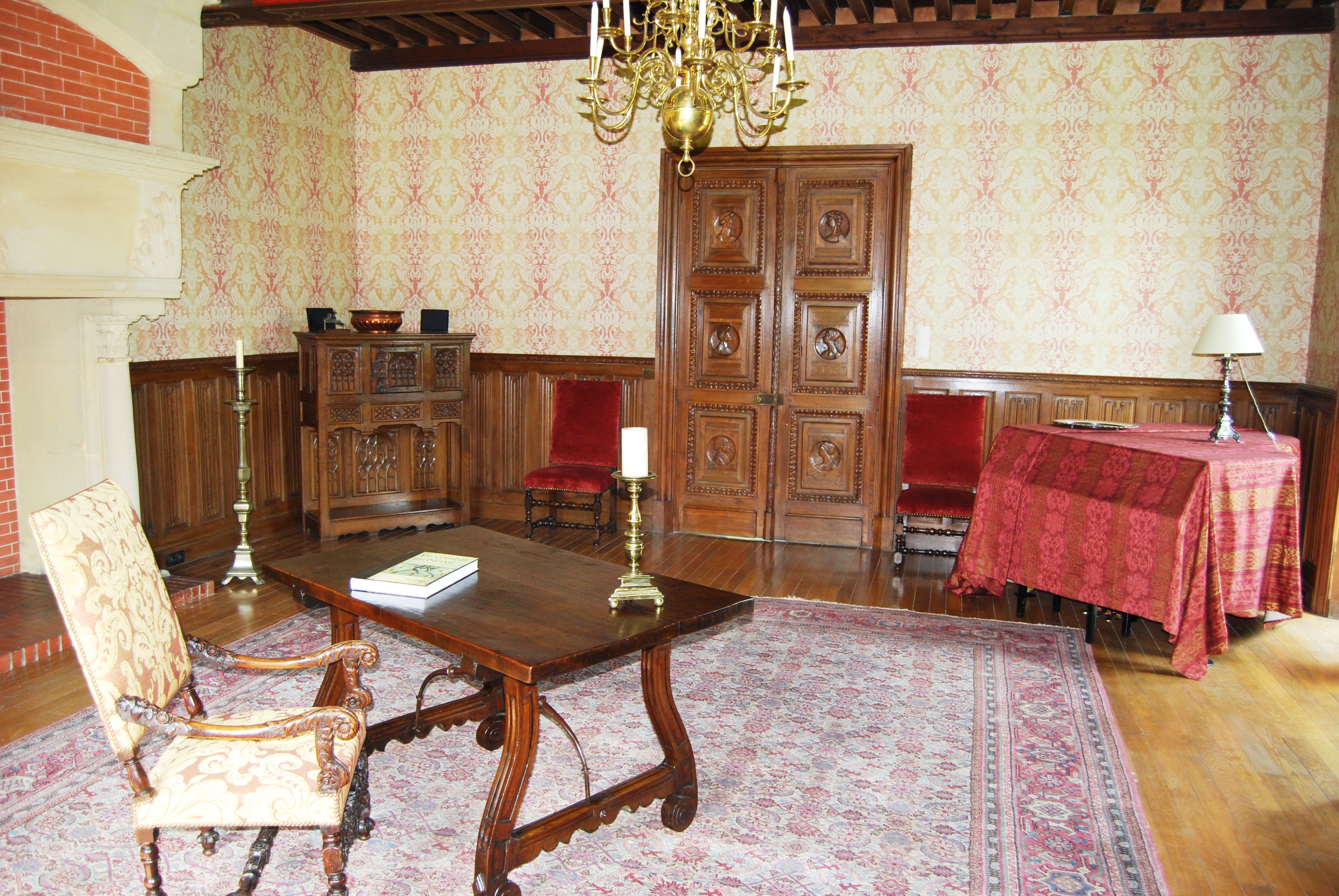
The Louis XIII Salon in the Chateau

=== Civil heritage ===
- The Chateau of Landreville (1567) is registered as an historical monument. The interior decor (16th century) is registered as an historical object.

=== Religious heritage ===
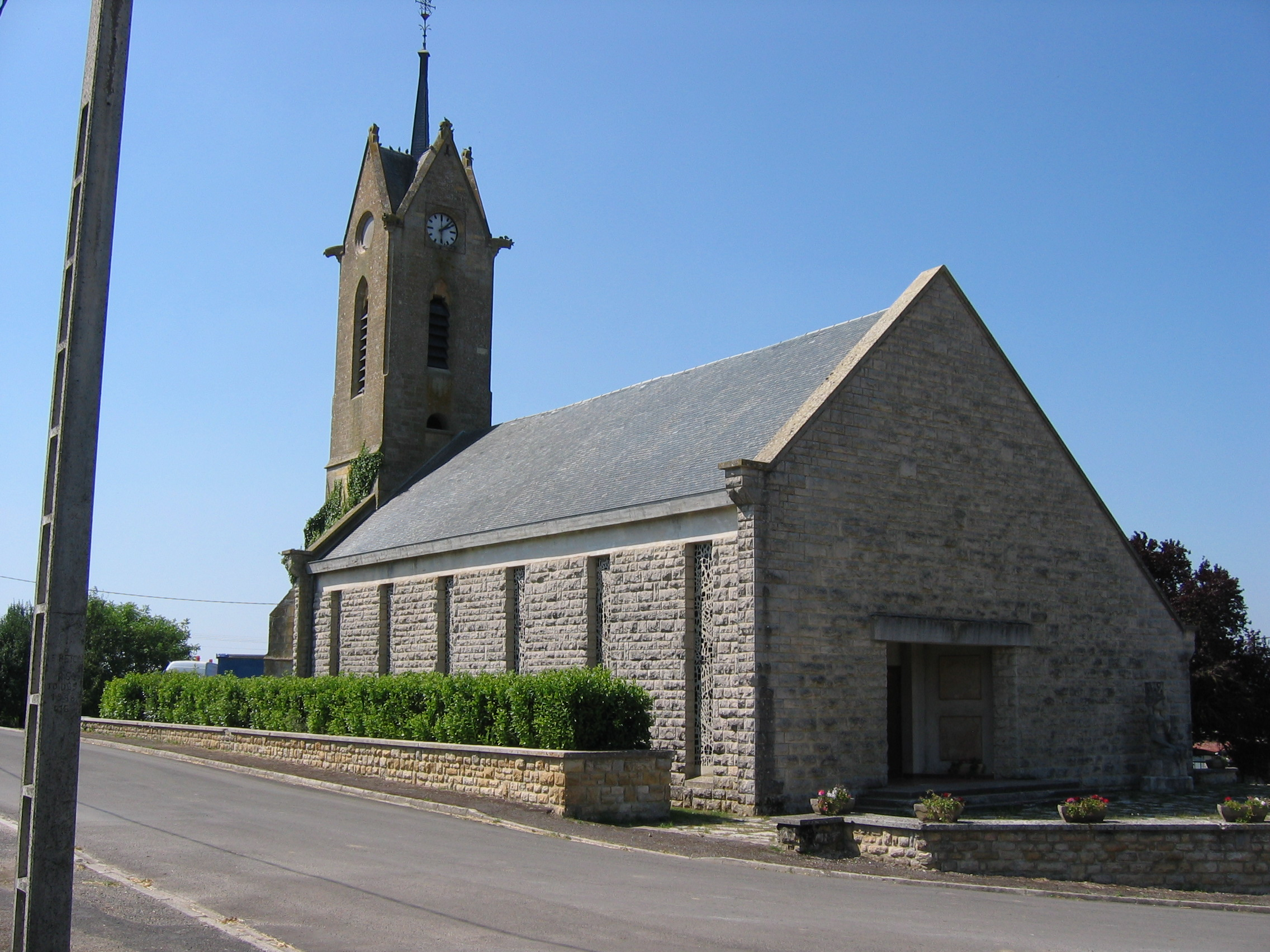
Bayonville Church

- Bayonville Church

== Notable people linked to the commune ==
- Claude-François de Maillard first Marquis of Landreville in 1760

== See also ==
- Communes of the Ardennes department
