= Château de Montmort =

Château in Montmort-Lucy, France

Coordinates: 48°55′24″N 3°48′39″E

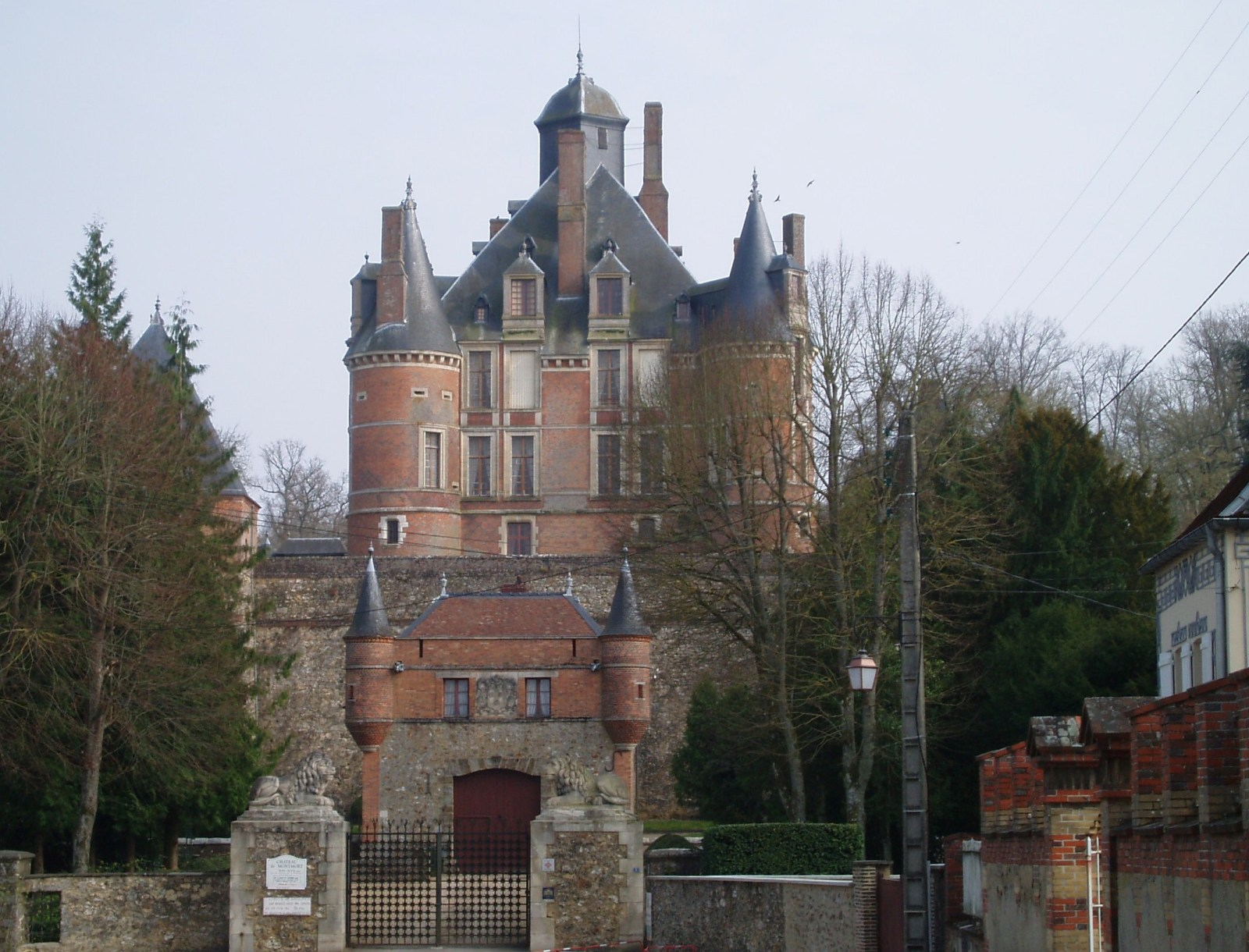
Château de Montmort

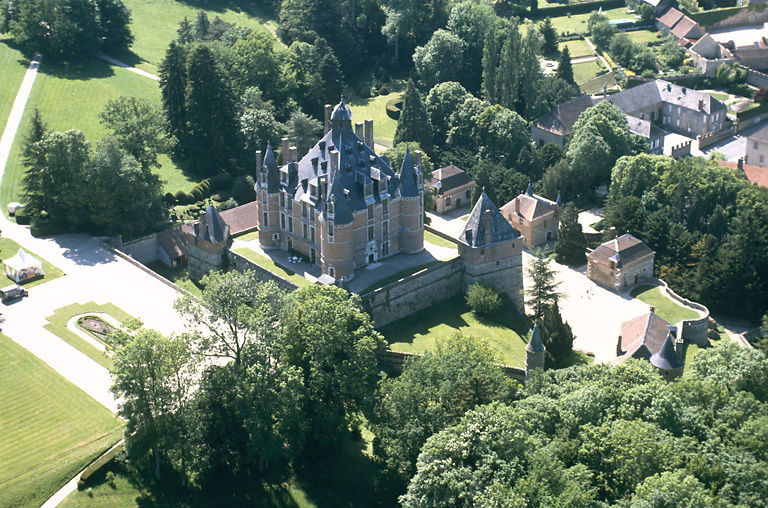
Aerial view

The Château de Montmort is a stately home built on the site of a medieval castle in the commune of Montmort-Lucy in the Marne département of France.

Describing the château, Victor Hugo wrote of a "delightful hustle and bustle of turrets of weather vanes, gables, skylights and fireplaces" (ravissant tohu-bohu de tourelles de pirouettes, de pignons, de lucarnes et de cheminées).

== History ==
A castle existed as early as the 11th century and there is still evidence of its existence in the ramparts and ditches.

The present buildings seem to date from the 16th century, the time of their reconstruction.

The castle was the headquarters for Karl von Bülow's German Second Army during the First Battle of the Marne. During the battle, Bülow and OHL Commander Helmuth von Moltke the Younger's representative. Richard Hentsch. held a crucial meeting at the castle and agreed that the force was threatened by an Allied encirclement. The subsequent retreat of Bulow's Second and Alexander von Kluck's First Armies was a crucial turning point of the First World War.

== Description ==
The lower structure has mullioned bay windows characteristic of the early Renaissance. At the sides, two flush towers were built to hold cannons. Two wings of the lower structure were removed in the 19th century. The higher structure, built later, carries the date of 1577.The building plan corresponds with a reference to the former castle in an old document: a square keep confined by circular towers. One tower includes an inclined ramp to allow horses to reach the higher levels.

The ground floor is composed of vaulted rooms. On the first floor, in the skirtings of the large living room, the engraver and theatre decorator Eugène Cicéri installed painted fabrics in 1851, taking as his inspiration the engravings of Sébastien Bourdon. The gatehouse with its brick turrets is also a 19th-century addition. The château is surrounded by a park and kitchen garden.

The château and its grounds have been protected since 2001 as a monument historique by the French Ministry of Culture. It had previously been classified and declassified in 1888.

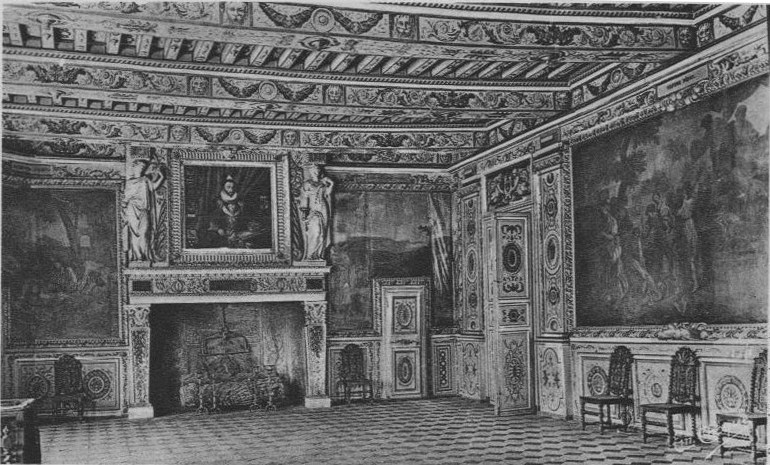
The guard room

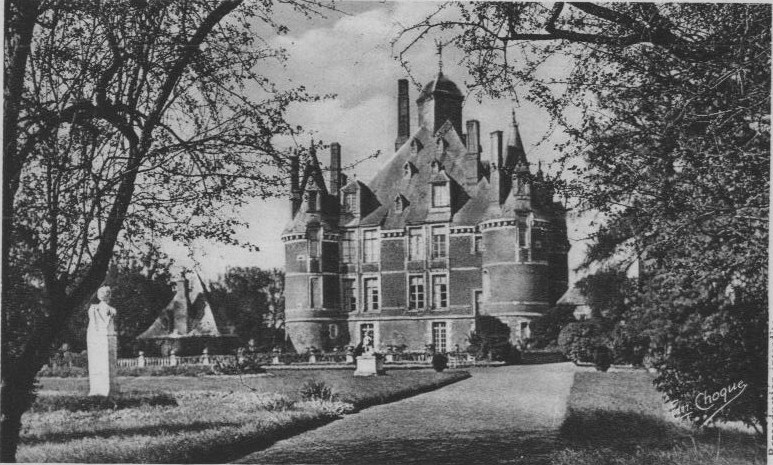
View from the park

== See also ==
- List of castles in France
