= Communauté de communes de Trévières =

Coordinates: 49.3357°N 0.8968°W

Trévières
- Former communauté de communes
- Interactive map of Trévières
- Country: France
- Region: Normandy
- Department: Calvados
- No. of communes: {{{nbcomm}}}
- Established: 2000
- Disbanded: 2017
- Area: 172.96 km^{2} (66.78 sq mi)
- Population (1999): 6,279
  - Density: 36.30/km^{2} (94.02/sq mi)

The communauté de communes de Trévières is a former communauté de communes in the Calvados department, in northern France. It was created in January 2000. It was merged into the new Communauté de communes Isigny-Omaha Intercom in January 2017.

The Communauté de communes comprised the following communes:

1. Aignerville
2. Asnières-en-Bessin
3. Bernesq
4. Blay
5. Bricqueville
6. Colleville-sur-Mer
7. Colombières
8. Crouay
9. Écrammeville
10. Étréham
11. La Folie
12. Formigny
13. Louvières
14. Maisons
15. Mandeville-en-Bessin
16. Mosles
17. Rubercy
18. Russy
19. Saint-Laurent-sur-Mer
20. Saint-Martin-de-Blagny
21. Sainte-Honorine-des-Pertes
22. Surrain
23. Tour-en-Bessin
24. Trévières
25. Vierville-sur-Mer
