= Orbigny =

Orbigny may refer to:

- One of the abbreviations used for Alcide d'Orbigny in biological citations
- Orbigny, Indre-et-Loire, a commune in the Indre-et-Loire department in France
- Orbigny-au-Mont, a commune in the Haute-Marne department in France
- Orbigny-au-Val, a commune in the Haute-Marne department in France

== See also ==
- d'Orbigny (disambiguation)
- Arbigny, a French commune
