= D'Orbigny (disambiguation) =

Alcide d'Orbigny (1802–1857) was a French naturalist and paleontologist who made contributions in zoology, geology, anthropology, and botany.

d'Orbigny may also refer to:

- Charles Henry Dessalines d'Orbigny (1806–1876), French botanist and geologist
- Henri d'Orbigny (1845-1915), French architect and entomologist
- D'Orbigny (meteorite)

== See also ==
- Orbigny (disambiguation)
