= Louvières =

Louvières is the name of several communes in France:

- Louvières, Calvados, in the Calvados département
- Louvières, Haute-Marne, in the Haute-Marne département
- Louvières-en-Auge, in the Orne département
