= Changé =

Changé may refer to the following places in France:

- Changé, Mayenne, a commune in the Mayenne department
- Changé, Sarthe, a commune in the Sarthe department

== See also ==
- Changey, a commune in the Haute-Marne department
- Change (disambiguation)
