= Asnières-en-Bessin =

- Commune
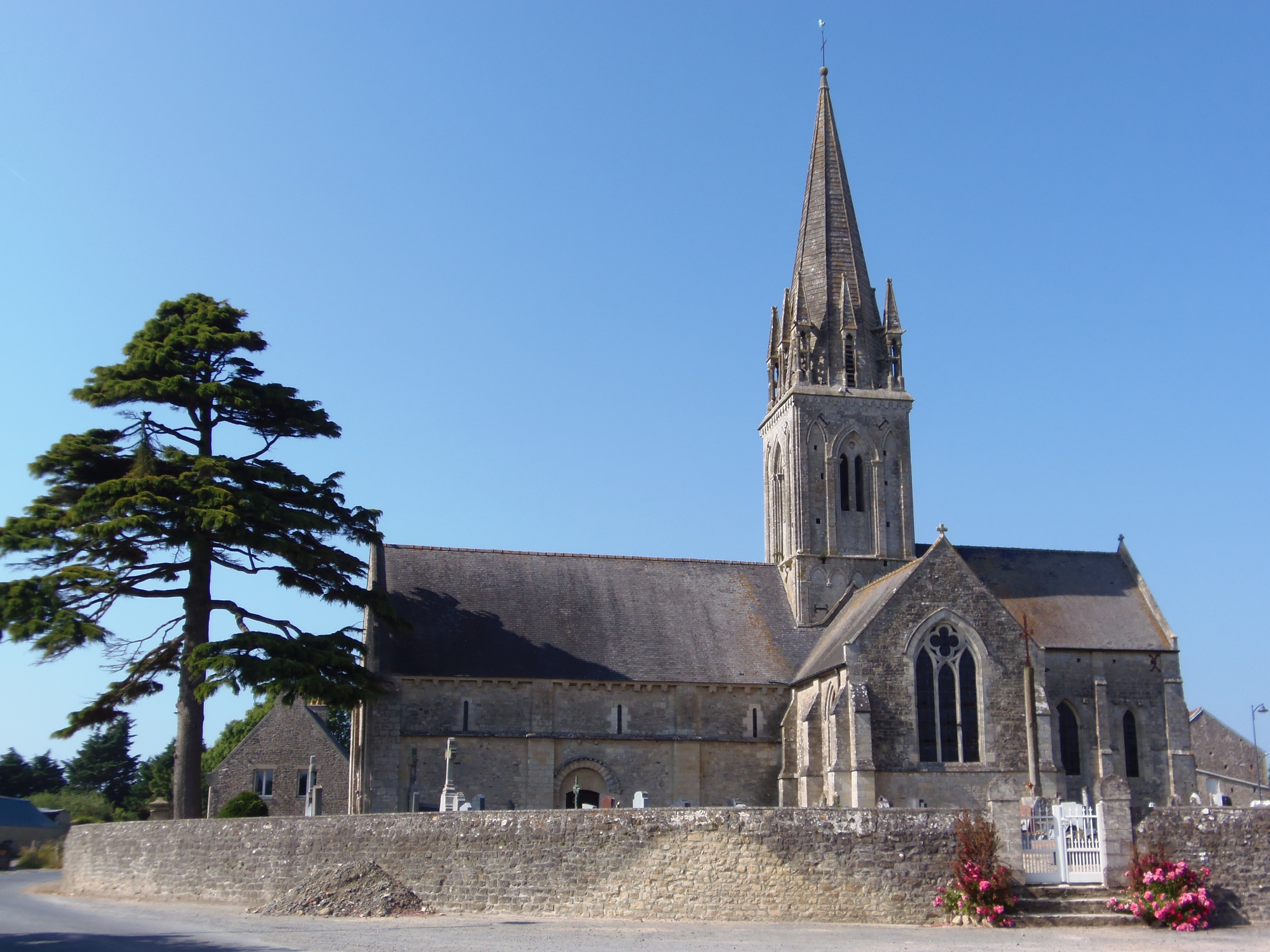
- The Church of Saint-Vigor
- Location of Asnières-en-Bessin
- Location within France Location within Normandy
- Coordinates: 49°22′07″N 0°56′13″W
- Country: France
- Region: Normandy
- Department: Calvados
- Arrondissement: Bayeux
- Canton: Trévières
- Intercommunality: CC Isigny-Omaha Intercom

Government
  - Mayor (2020–2026): Patrick Deshayes
- Area^{1}: 4.61 km^{2} (1.78 sq mi)
- Elevation: 50 m (160 ft)
- Highest elevation: 49 m (161 ft)
- Lowest elevation: 12 m (39 ft)
- Population (2023): 73
  - Density: 16/km^{2} (41/sq mi)
- Time zone: UTC+01:00 (CET)
  - Summer (DST): UTC+02:00 (CEST)
- INSEE/Postal code: 14023 /14710
- ^{1} French Land Register data, which excludes lakes, ponds, glaciers > 1 km^{2} (0.386 sq mi or 247 acres) and river estuaries.

Asnières-en-Bessin (French pronunciation: [ɑnjɛʁ ɑ̃ bɛsɛ̃]; literally "Asnières in Bessin") is a commune in the Calvados department in the Normandy region of north-western France.

== Geography ==
Asnières-en-Bessin is located some 17 km west by north-west of Bayeux, 3 km west of Vierville-sur-Mer, and 4 km north by north-east of Longueville. Access to the commune is by the D194 road from Louvières in the east passing through the north of the commune and the village and continuing west to Cricqueville-en-Bessin. The D198 road goes south from the village through the length of the commune and continues to Aignerville. There is the hamlet of Le Temple just south of the village and Montigny in the south of the commune. The commune is entirely farmland.

The Veret river flows through the centre of the commune from east to west and continues west then north-west to the sea at the Pont du Hable.

== Administration ==
List of Successive Mayors

From	To	Name	Party	Position
1983	2008	Paulette Cuillandre		
2008	2026	Patrick Deshayes		Farmer

== Demography ==
The inhabitants of the commune are known as Asnièrois or Asnièroises in French.

Historical population

Year	Pop.	±% p.a.
1793	278	—
1821	219	−0.85%
1846	201	−0.34%
1872	166	−0.73%
1901	123	−1.03%
1926	124	+0.03%
1946	107	−0.73%
1962	106	−0.06%
1968	91	−2.51%

Year	Pop.	±% p.a.
1975	91	+0.00%
1982	74	−2.91%
1990	61	−2.39%
1999	55	−1.14%
2007	62	+1.51%
2012	58	−1.32%
2017	65	+2.31%
2023	73	+1.95%

Source: EHESS and INSEE

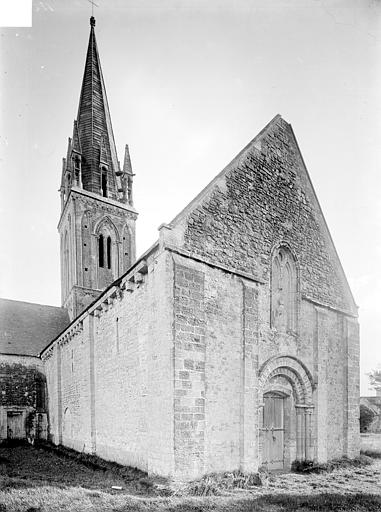
The church before 1919

== Sites and monuments ==
- Château of Asnières-en-Bessin, built in 1693, rebuilt in 1783.

== Notable people linked to the commune ==
- Arthur Le Duc (1848-1918), sculptor, was the Mayor of the commune from 1893 to his death in 1918.
- Albert Anne (1908-1944), a member of the resistance in the Alliance network, (A resistance network in the interior of France during the Second World War) he was arrested by the Gestapo on 5 May 1944 at Asnières-en-Bessin, where he had used his skills as a forger, and he was executed at Caen jail on 6 June 1944.

== See also ==
- Communes of the Calvados department

=== External links ===
- Asnières-en-Bessin on Géoportail, National Geographic Institute (IGN) website (in French)
- Asnieres on the 1750 Cassini Map
