= Cuves =

Cuves may refer to the following communes in France:

- Cuves, Manche, in the Manche département
- Cuves, Haute-Marne, in the Haute-Marne département
