= Andilly =

Andilly may refer to:

== Places in France ==
- Andilly, Charente-Maritime in the Charente-Maritime department
- Andilly, Meurthe-et-Moselle in the Meurthe-et-Moselle] department
- Andilly, Haute-Savoie in the Haute-Savoie department
- Andilly, Val-d'Oise in the Val-d'Oise department
- Andilly-en-Bassigny in the Haute-Marne department

== People ==
- Robert Arnauld d'Andilly (1589-1674), a French state counsellor
- Simon Arnauld de Pomponne (1618-1699), a French diplomat
