= Harpalus numidicus =

Scientific classification
- Kingdom: Animalia
- Phylum: Arthropoda
- Class: Insecta
- Order: Coleoptera
- Suborder: Adephaga
- Family: Carabidae
- Genus: Harpalus
- Species: H. numidicus

Binomial name
- Harpalus numidicus Bedel, 1893

Synonyms
- Harpalus melinomerus Antoine, 1959; Harpalus myops Antoine, 1959; Harpalus plastographus Antoine, 1941

Species of beetle

Harpalus numidicus is a species of ground beetle in the subfamily Harpalinae. It was described by Bedel in 1893 and is found in Spain, Morocco, and Algeria. It is 9 to 11 mm long and has a series of large, staggered dots on the third interstria of the elytra.
