= Vitry-lès-Nogent =

- Commune
- Location of Vitry-lès-Nogent
- Location within France Location within Grand Est
- Coordinates: 47°59′37″N 5°20′51″E
- Country: France
- Region: Grand Est
- Department: Haute-Marne
- Arrondissement: Chaumont
- Canton: Nogent
- Intercommunality: CA Chaumont

Government
  - Mayor (2024–2026): Dominique Bourguignon
- Area^{1}: 7.95 km^{2} (3.07 sq mi)
- Elevation: 390 m (1,280 ft)
- Population (2023): 205
  - Density: 25.8/km^{2} (66.8/sq mi)
- Demonym(s): Vitryers, Vitryères
- Time zone: UTC+01:00 (CET)
  - Summer (DST): UTC+02:00 (CEST)
- INSEE/Postal code: 52541 /52800
- ^{1} French Land Register data, which excludes lakes, ponds, glaciers > 1 km^{2} (0.386 sq mi or 247 acres) and river estuaries.

Vitry-lès-Nogent (French pronunciation: [vitʁi lɛ̃ nɔʒɑ̃], literally Vitry near Nogent) is a commune in the Haute-Marne department in north-eastern France.

== See also ==
- Communes of the Haute-Marne department
