= 71st Fighter Wing =

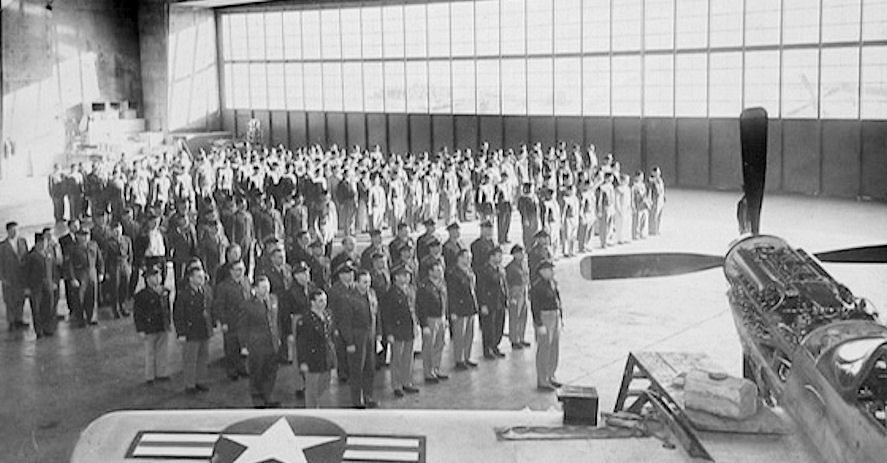
- 124th Fighter Squadron, Iowa Air National Guard formation, Des Moines Municipal Airport, 1953
- Active: 1943–1945; 1946-1950
- Country: United States
- Branch: United States Air Force
- Type: Wing
- Role: Command and Control
- Part of: Missouri Air National Guard

The 71st Fighter Wing (71 FW) is a disbanded unit of the United States Air Force, last stationed at Lambert Field, St. Louis, Missouri. It was withdrawn from the Missouri Air National Guard (MO ANG) and inactivated on 31 October 1950.

This wing is not related to the 71st Tactical Reconnaissance Wing or subsequent units that was constituted on 18 August 1948 and activated on 25 October 1948.

== History ==
=== World War II ===
Established and organized at March Field, California in 1943 as a command and control organization. Deployed to the European Theater of Operations (ETO) in late 1943 and assigned to IX Fighter Command, Ninth Air Force. Initial Mission of the Wing was to receive operational orders from Headquarters, IX Fighter Command and direct subordinate groups in attacking enemy targets in Occupied France and the Low Countries in preparation for the Normandy Invasion in June 1944. Targets included bridges, roads, railroads and enemy interceptor aircraft both on the ground as well as in air-to-air combat.

After the D-Day invasion, was directed to provide ground support for advancing United States First Army forces in France, attacking enemy targets initially in the Cotentin Peninsula, then supported Operation Cobra, the breakout of Normandy and attacked enemy forces in the Falaise-Argentan Gap.

Reassigned to IX Air Defense Command on 1 July 1944, its mission was changed to provide air defense against attacking enemy aircraft over liberated areas of France and later, the Low Countries. Wing headquarters and subordinate units operated primarily from liberated airfields and newly built temporary Advanced Landing Grounds in continental Europe. Along with air defense, subordinate units engaged in combat in support of ground forces during the breakthrough at St. Lo in July 1944. Attacked tanks, trucks, and troop concentrations as enemy retreated; provided armed reconnaissance for advancing Allied armored columns. During September 1944, attacked flak positions near Eindhoven during Operation Market-Garden, the airborne landing in the Netherlands; bombed enemy communications and transportation lines in western Germany. Flew armed reconnaissance missions over Battle of the Bulge during December 1944 – January 1944. Flew missions against enemy transportation systems including motor vehicles, bridges, trains, railway bridges, and marshalling yards during February and March 1945. Moved to Germany in April 1945, flying last combat missions on 3 May 1945.

Remained in Europe after the war as part of United States Air Forces in Europe, performing occupation duty and the destruction or shipment to the United States of captured enemy combat equipment. Demobilized in Germany and organization was inactivated as an administrative unit in the United States, December 1945.

=== Air National Guard ===
Allocated to the Missouri Air National Guard for command and control origination for units in the Midwest Region (North & South Dakota, Minnesota, Nebraska, Iowa, Kansas, Missouri) of the United States. Extended federal recognition and activated on 3 July 1946.

At the end of October 1950, the Air National Guard converted to the wing-base (Hobson Plan) organization. As a result, the wing was withdrawn from the Missouri ANG and was inactivated on 31 October 1950. The 131st Composite Wing was established by the National Guard Bureau, allocated to the state of Missouri, recognized and activated 1 November 1950; assuming the personnel, equipment and mission of the inactivated 71st Fighter Wing.

=== Operations and decorations ===
- Combat Operations: Combat in European Theater of Operations (ETO), 23 December 1943-May 1945.
- Campaigns: Air Offensive, Europe; Normandy; Northern France
- Decorations: Cited in the Order of the Day, Belgian Army: 6 Jun-6 Jun-[Aug] 1944

=== Lineage ===
- Organized as 71st Fighter Wing on 11 Oct 1943

Activated on 15 August 1943
Inactivated on 3 December 1945

- Allotted to the Missouri ANG on 24 May 1946

Extended federal recognition and activated on 3 July 1946
Inactivated, and returned to the control of the Department of the Air Force, on 31 October 1950

- Disbanded on 15 June 1983

=== Assignments ===
- Fourth Air Force, 15 August – 23 December 1943
- IX Fighter Command, 4 December 1943 – 1 July 1944
- IX Air Defense Command, 1 July 1944 – November 1945
- Missouri Air National Guard, 3 July 1946 – 31 October 1950

=== Components ===
==== World War II ====
- 358th Fighter Group: (P-47 Thunderbolt), 1 August-1 October 1944

Attached to: IX Tactical Air Command, entire period

- 366th Fighter Group: (P-47 Thunderbolt), 10 January 1944 – 3 December 1945
- 368th Fighter Group: (P-47 Thunderbolt), 1 August-1 October 1944

Attached to: IX Tactical Air Command, entire period

- 370th Fighter Group: (P-38 Lightning), 1 August-1 October 1944

Attached to: IX Tactical Air Command, entire period

- 422d Night Fighter Squadron: (P-61 Black Widow), 4 May-6 August 1944

==== Missouri Air National Guard ====
- 131st Fighter Group, 15 July 1946 – 31 October 1950
- 132d Fighter Group, 23 August 1946 – 31 October 1950 (Iowa ANG)
- 133d Fighter Group, 28 August 1947 – 31 October 1950 (Minnesota ANG)
- 136th Fighter Group, 27 January 1947 – 23 May 1948 (Texas ANG)
- 137th Fighter Group, 18 December 1947 – 23 May 1948 (Oklahoma ANG)
- 122d Bombardment Group (Light), 5 December 1946 – 23 May 1948 (Louisiana ANG)
- 157th Air Control and Warning Group, 1948 - 1951
- 154th Fighter Squadron, 27 May 1946 – 2 October 1947 (Arkansas ANG)
- 175th Fighter Squadron, 20 September 1946 – 28 August 1947 (South Dakota ANG)

=== Stations ===
- March Field, California, 15 August – 26 November 1943
- RAF Aldermaston (AAF-467), England, 23 December 1943
- RAF Greenham Common (AAF-486), England, 14 January 1944
- RAF Andover (AAF-406), England, 1 March – 4 July 1944
- Ecrammeville, France, 7 July 1944
- St-Pierre-Eglise, France, 4 August 1944
- Ecrammeville, France, 7 August 1944
- Rennes Airfield (A-27), France, 20 August 1944
- Versailles, France, 9 September 1944
- Vittel, France, 23 October 1944
- Heidelberg, Germany, 23 April 1945
- Nancy, France, 21 May 1945
- Nancy/Essey Airfield (Y-42), France, 16 July 1945
- Darmstadt, Germany, 25 September–November 1945
- Camp Shanks, New York, 2–3 December 1945
- Lambert Field, St. Louis, Missouri, 3 July 1946 – 31 October 1950
