= Sarcey =

Sarcey may refer to two communes in France:

- Sarcey, Haute-Marne, in the Grand Est region
- Sarcey, Rhône, in the Auvergne-Rhône-Alpes region
