= Lanques-sur-Rognon =

- Commune
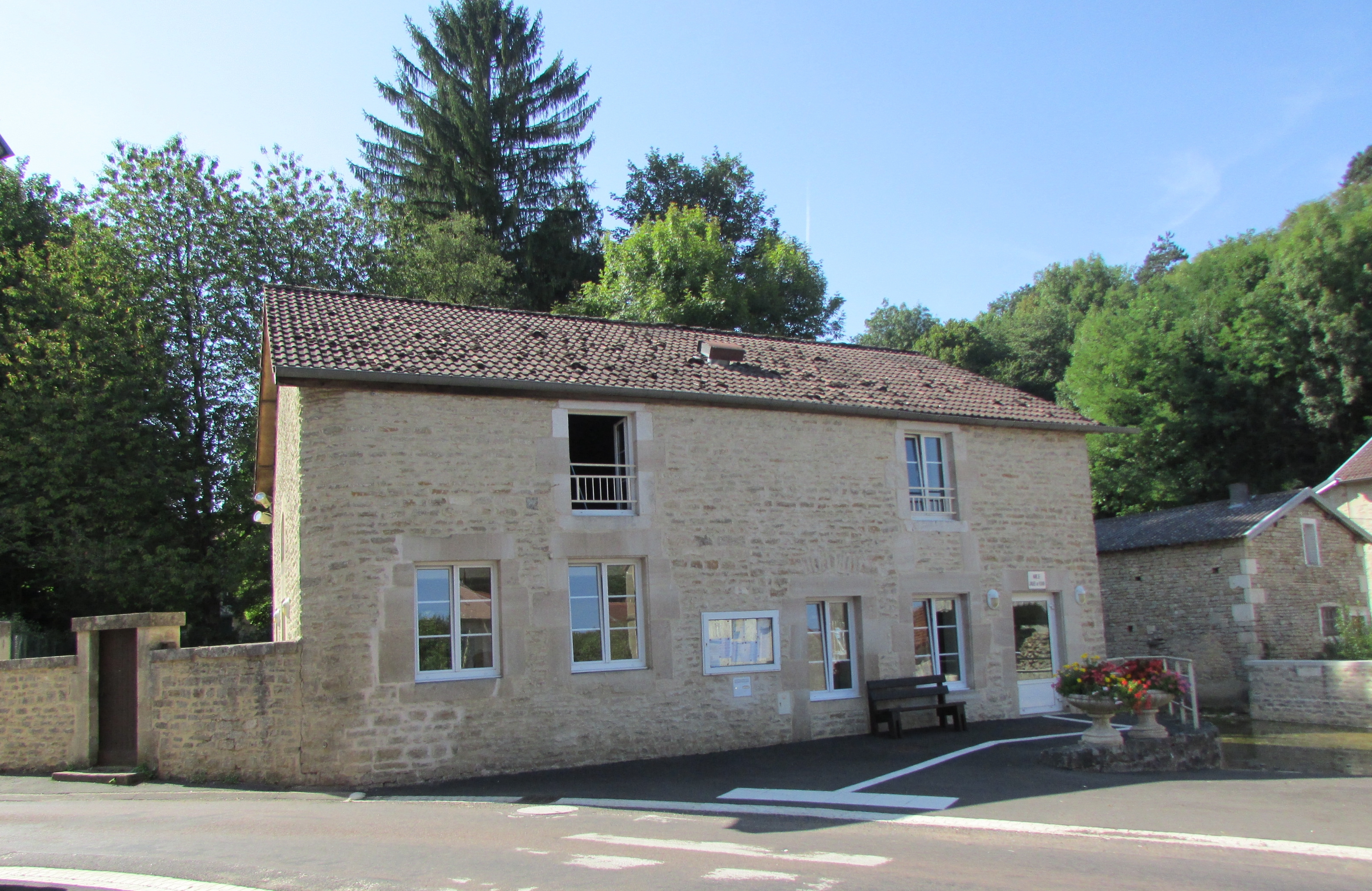
- The town hall in Lanques-sur-Rognon
- Location of Lanques-sur-Rognon
- Location within France Location within Grand Est
- Coordinates: 48°05′16″N 5°22′14″E
- Country: France
- Region: Grand Est
- Department: Haute-Marne
- Arrondissement: Chaumont
- Canton: Nogent
- Intercommunality: CA Chaumont

Government
  - Mayor (2020–2026): Michelle Pettini
- Area^{1}: 13.12 km^{2} (5.07 sq mi)
- Elevation: 360 m (1,180 ft)
- Population (2023): 213
  - Density: 16.2/km^{2} (42.0/sq mi)
- Time zone: UTC+01:00 (CET)
  - Summer (DST): UTC+02:00 (CEST)
- INSEE/Postal code: 52271 /52800
- ^{1} French Land Register data, which excludes lakes, ponds, glaciers > 1 km^{2} (0.386 sq mi or 247 acres) and river estuaries.

Lanques-sur-Rognon (French pronunciation: [lɑ̃k syʁ ʁɔɲɔ̃]) is a commune in the Haute-Marne department in north-eastern France.

== See also ==
- Communes of the Haute-Marne department
