= Rolampont =

- Commune
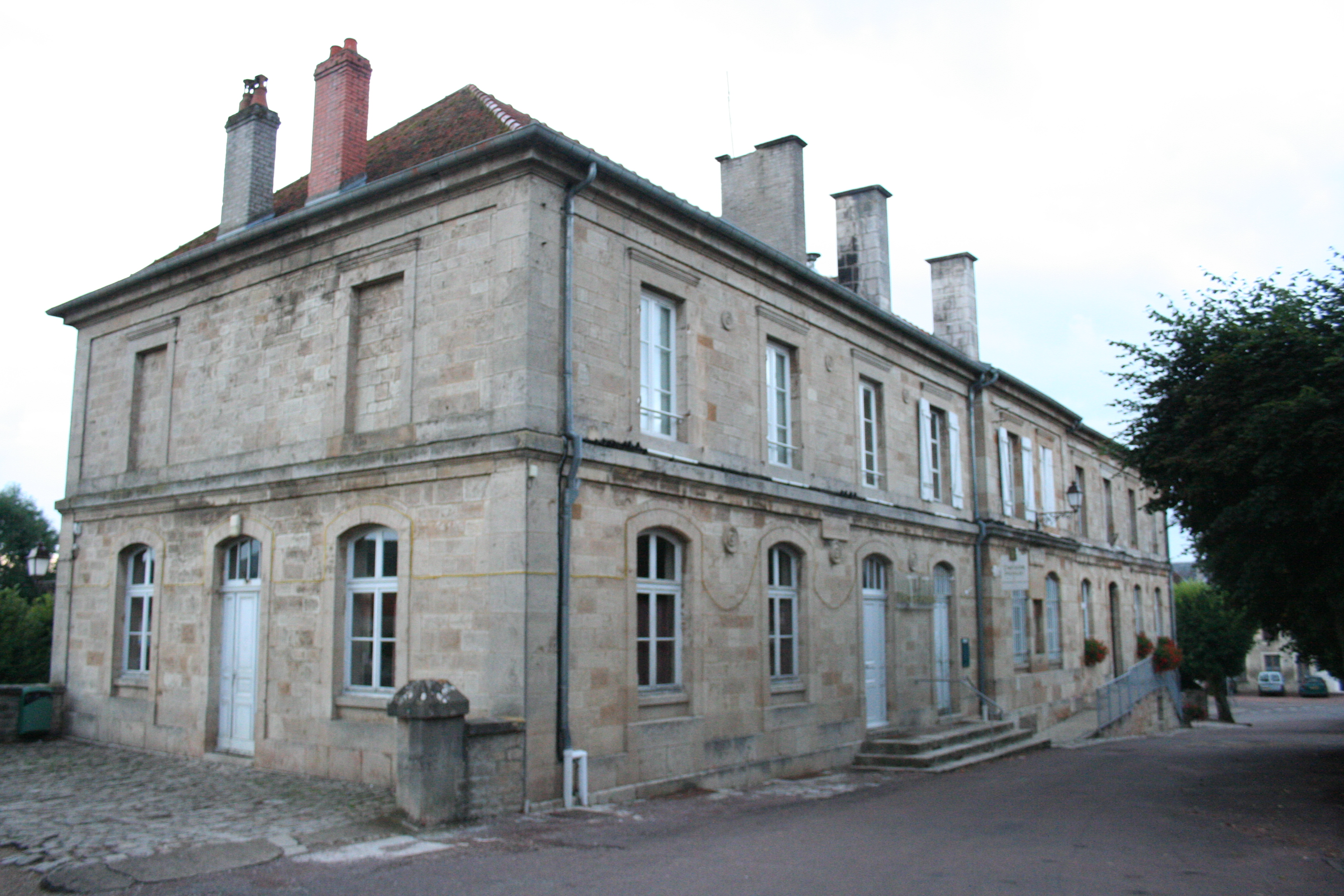
- The town hall in Rolampont
- Location of Rolampont
- Location within France Location within Grand Est
- Coordinates: 47°57′02″N 5°17′15″E
- Country: France
- Region: Grand Est
- Department: Haute-Marne
- Arrondissement: Langres
- Canton: Nogent
- Intercommunality: Grand Langres

Government
  - Mayor (2020–2026): Céline Bernand
- Area^{1}: 49.1 km^{2} (19.0 sq mi)
- Elevation: 317 m (1,040 ft)
- Highest elevation: 462 m (1,516 ft)
- Lowest elevation: 299 m (981 ft)
- Population (2023): 1,373
  - Density: 28.0/km^{2} (72.4/sq mi)
- Demonym(s): Rolampontais, Rolampontaises
- Time zone: UTC+01:00 (CET)
  - Summer (DST): UTC+02:00 (CEST)
- INSEE/Postal code: 52432 /52260
- ^{1} French Land Register data, which excludes lakes, ponds, glaciers > 1 km^{2} (0.386 sq mi or 247 acres) and river estuaries.

Rolampont (French pronunciation: [ʁɔlɑ̃pɔ̃]) is a commune in the Haute-Marne department in north-eastern France.

== See also ==
- Communes of the Haute-Marne department
