= Forcey =

- Commune
- Location of Forcey
- Location within France Location within Grand Est
- Coordinates: 48°09′03″N 5°21′30″E
- Country: France
- Region: Grand Est
- Department: Haute-Marne
- Arrondissement: Chaumont
- Canton: Nogent
- Intercommunality: CA Chaumont

Government
  - Mayor (2020–2026): Jean-Louis Benoît
- Area^{1}: 5.28 km^{2} (2.04 sq mi)
- Elevation: 313 m (1,027 ft)
- Population (2023): 59
  - Density: 11/km^{2} (29/sq mi)
- Time zone: UTC+01:00 (CET)
  - Summer (DST): UTC+02:00 (CEST)
- INSEE/Postal code: 52204 /52700
- ^{1} French Land Register data, which excludes lakes, ponds, glaciers > 1 km^{2} (0.386 sq mi or 247 acres) and river estuaries.

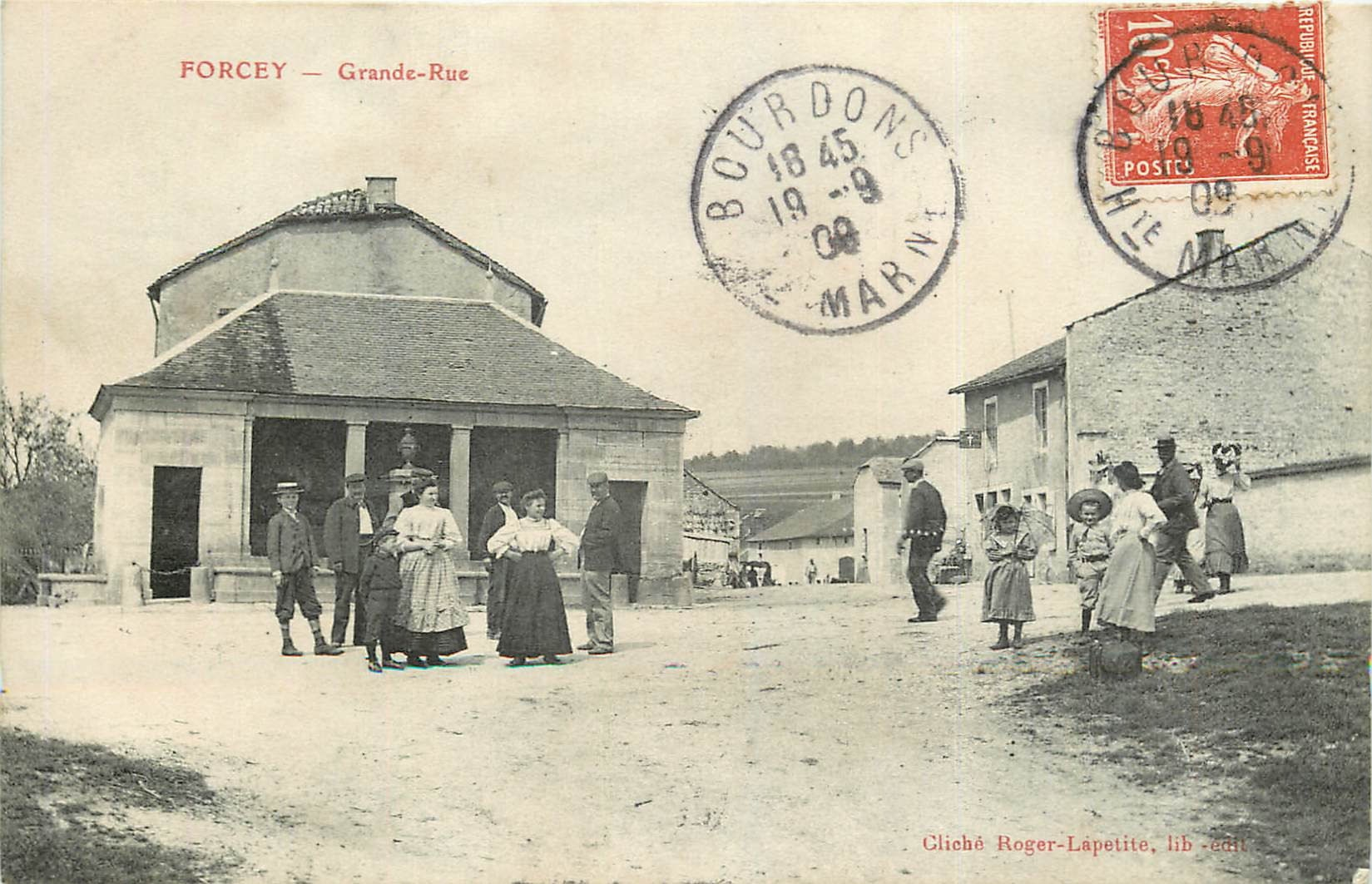
Forcey carte postale La place vers

Forcey (French pronunciation: [fɔʁsɛ]) is a commune in the Haute-Marne department in north-eastern France. It has a population of 64 (2017).

== See also ==
- Communes of the Haute-Marne department
