= Formigny La Bataille =

- Commune
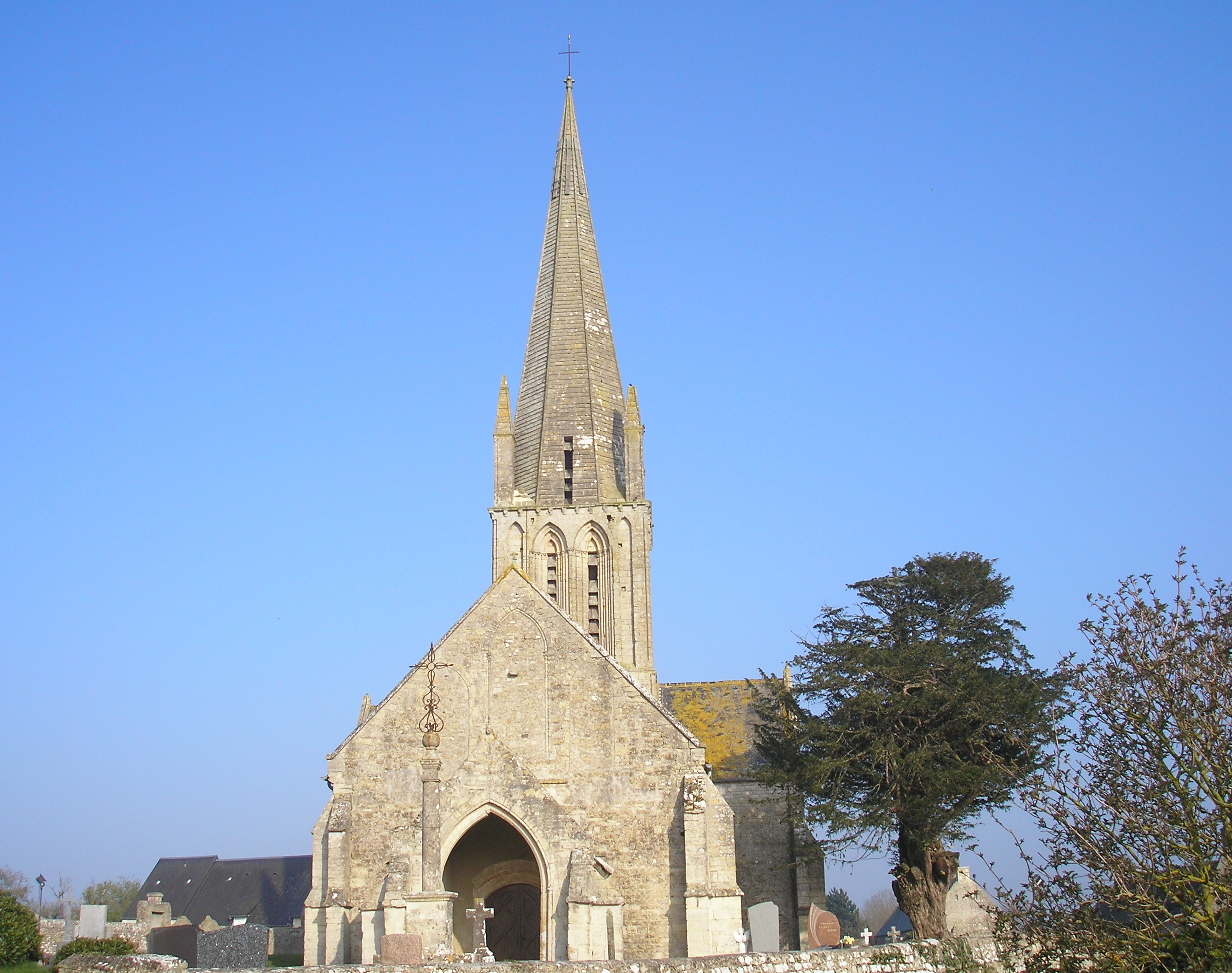
- The church in Formigny La Bataille
- Location of Formigny La Bataille
- Location within France Location within Normandy
- Coordinates: 49°20′10″N 0°53′56″W
- Country: France
- Region: Normandy
- Department: Calvados
- Arrondissement: Bayeux
- Canton: Trévières
- Intercommunality: CC Isigny-Omaha Intercom

Government
  - Mayor (2020–2026): Alain Gervais
- Area^{1}: 26.24 km^{2} (10.13 sq mi)
- Population (2023): 765
  - Density: 29.2/km^{2} (75.5/sq mi)
- Time zone: UTC+01:00 (CET)
  - Summer (DST): UTC+02:00 (CEST)
- INSEE/Postal code: 14281 /14710
- ^{1} French Land Register data, which excludes lakes, ponds, glaciers > 1 km^{2} (0.386 sq mi or 247 acres) and river estuaries.

Formigny La Bataille (French pronunciation: [fɔʁmiɲi la bataj]) is a commune in the department of Calvados, northwestern France. The municipality was established on 1 January 2017 by the merger of the former communes of Formigny (the seat), Aignerville, Écrammeville and Louvières.

== See also ==
- Communes of the Calvados department
