= Poulangy =

- Commune
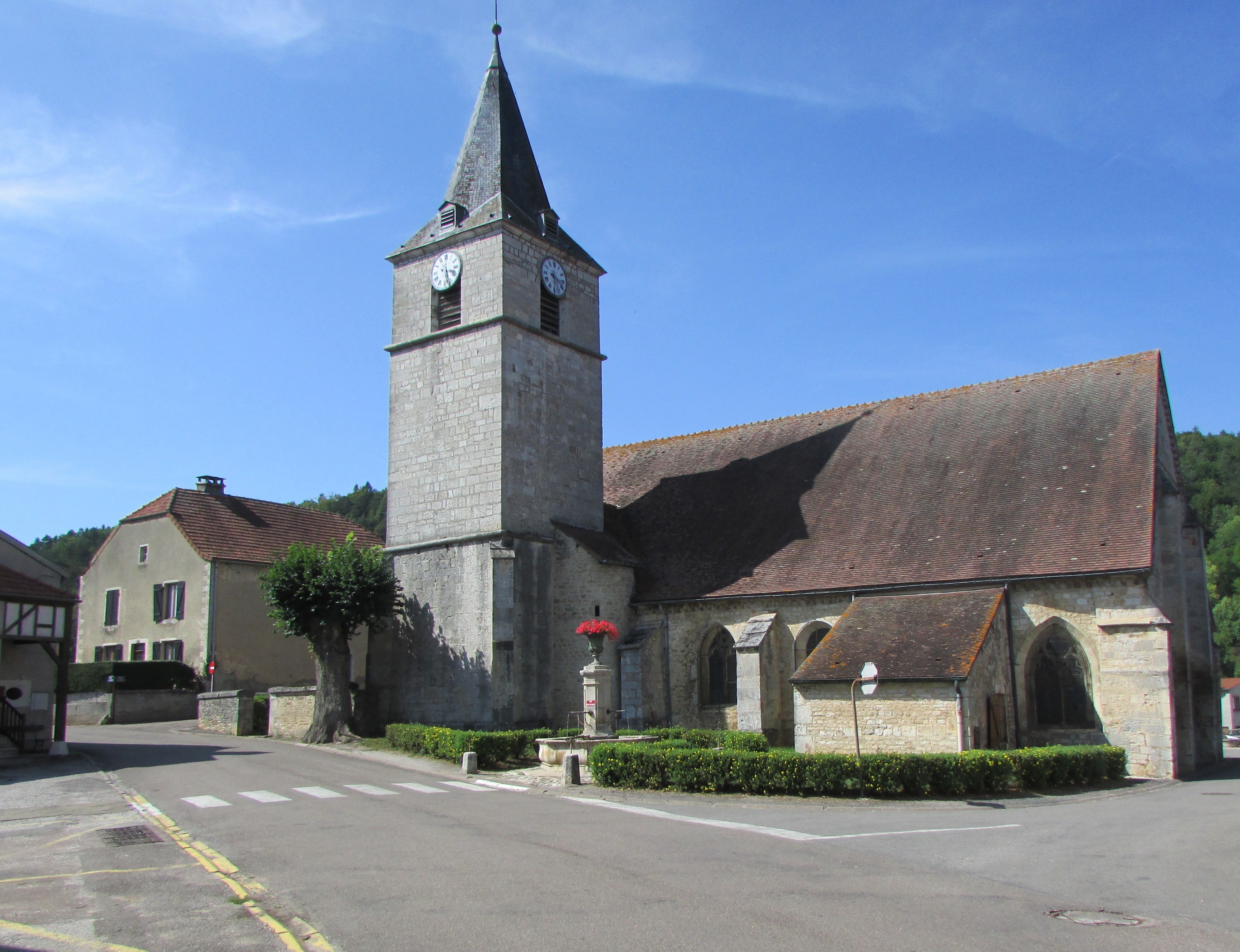
- The church in Poulangy

- Coat of arms
- Location of Poulangy
- Location within France Location within Grand Est
- Coordinates: 48°02′33″N 5°15′19″E
- Country: France
- Region: Grand Est
- Department: Haute-Marne
- Arrondissement: Chaumont
- Canton: Nogent
- Intercommunality: CA Chaumont

Government
  - Mayor (2020–2026): Olivier Billiard
- Area^{1}: 17.39 km^{2} (6.71 sq mi)
- Elevation: 280 m (920 ft)
- Population (2023): 361
  - Density: 20.8/km^{2} (53.8/sq mi)
- Time zone: UTC+01:00 (CET)
  - Summer (DST): UTC+02:00 (CEST)
- INSEE/Postal code: 52401 /52800
- ^{1} French Land Register data, which excludes lakes, ponds, glaciers > 1 km^{2} (0.386 sq mi or 247 acres) and river estuaries.

Poulangy (French pronunciation: [pulɑ̃ʒi]) is a commune in the Haute-Marne department in north-eastern France. It is located on the Traire river, a tributary of the Marne.

== See also ==
- Communes of the Haute-Marne department
