= Canton of Nogent =

Coordinates: 48.03°N 5.34°E

The Canton of Nogent is an administrative division of the Haute-Marne department, northeastern France. Its borders were modified at the French canton reorganisation which came into effect in March 2015. Its seat is in Nogent.

It consists of the following communes:

1. Ageville
2. Andilly-en-Bassigny
3. Bannes
4. Biesles
5. Bonnecourt
6. Changey
7. Charmes
8. Cuves
9. Dampierre
10. Esnouveaux
11. Forcey
12. Lanques-sur-Rognon
13. Louvières
14. Mandres-la-Côte
15. Marnay-sur-Marne
16. Neuilly-l'Évêque
17. Ninville
18. Nogent
19. Orbigny-au-Mont
20. Orbigny-au-Val
21. Plesnoy
22. Poinson-lès-Nogent
23. Poiseul
24. Poulangy
25. Rolampont
26. Sarcey
27. Thivet
28. Vesaignes-sur-Marne
29. Vitry-lès-Nogent
