= Bannes, Haute-Marne =

Bannes
- Commune
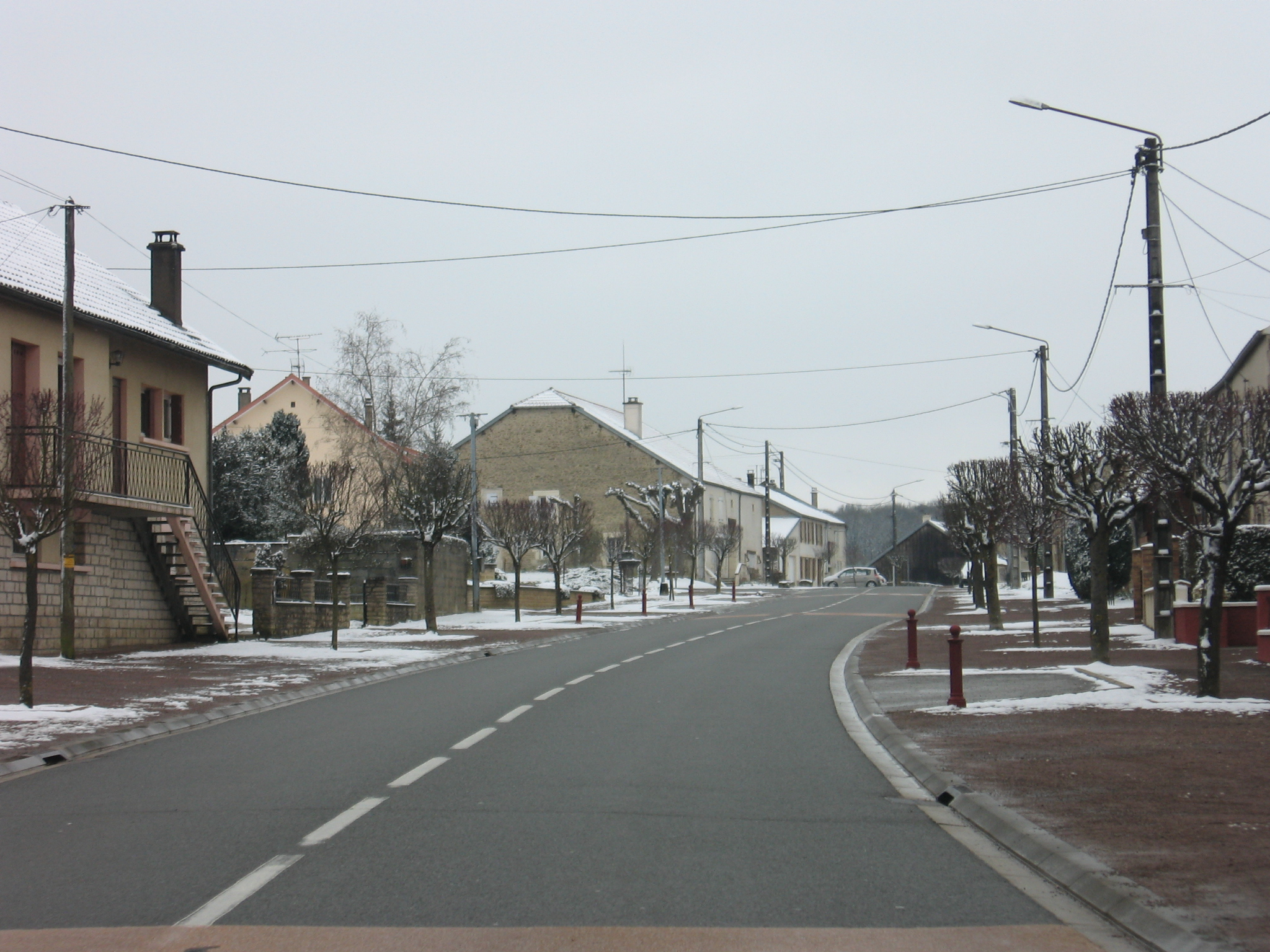
- A view within Bannes
- Location of Bannes
- Location within France Location within Grand Est
- Coordinates: 47°54′15″N 5°23′55″E
- Country: France
- Region: Grand Est
- Department: Haute-Marne
- Arrondissement: Langres
- Canton: Nogent

Government
  - Mayor (2020–2026): Fabrice Maréchal
- Area^{1}: 9.16 km^{2} (3.54 sq mi)
- Elevation: 350 m (1,150 ft)
- Highest elevation: 424 m (1,391 ft)
- Lowest elevation: 337 m (1,106 ft)
- Population (2023): 360
  - Density: 39/km^{2} (100/sq mi)
- Time zone: UTC+01:00 (CET)
  - Summer (DST): UTC+02:00 (CEST)
- INSEE/Postal code: 52037 /52360
- ^{1} French Land Register data, which excludes lakes, ponds, glaciers > 1 km^{2} (0.386 sq mi or 247 acres) and river estuaries.

Bannes (French pronunciation: [ban]) is a commune in the Haute-Marne department in the Grand Est region in northeastern France.

== Population ==
Historical population
Year	Pop.	±% p.a.
1968	265	—
1975	312	+2.36%
1982	365	+2.27%
1990	393	+0.93%
1999	392	−0.03%
2007	402	+0.32%
2012	401	−0.05%
2017	374	−1.38%
2023	360	−0.63%
Source: INSEE

== See also ==
- Communes of the Haute-Marne department
