= Biesles =

- Commune
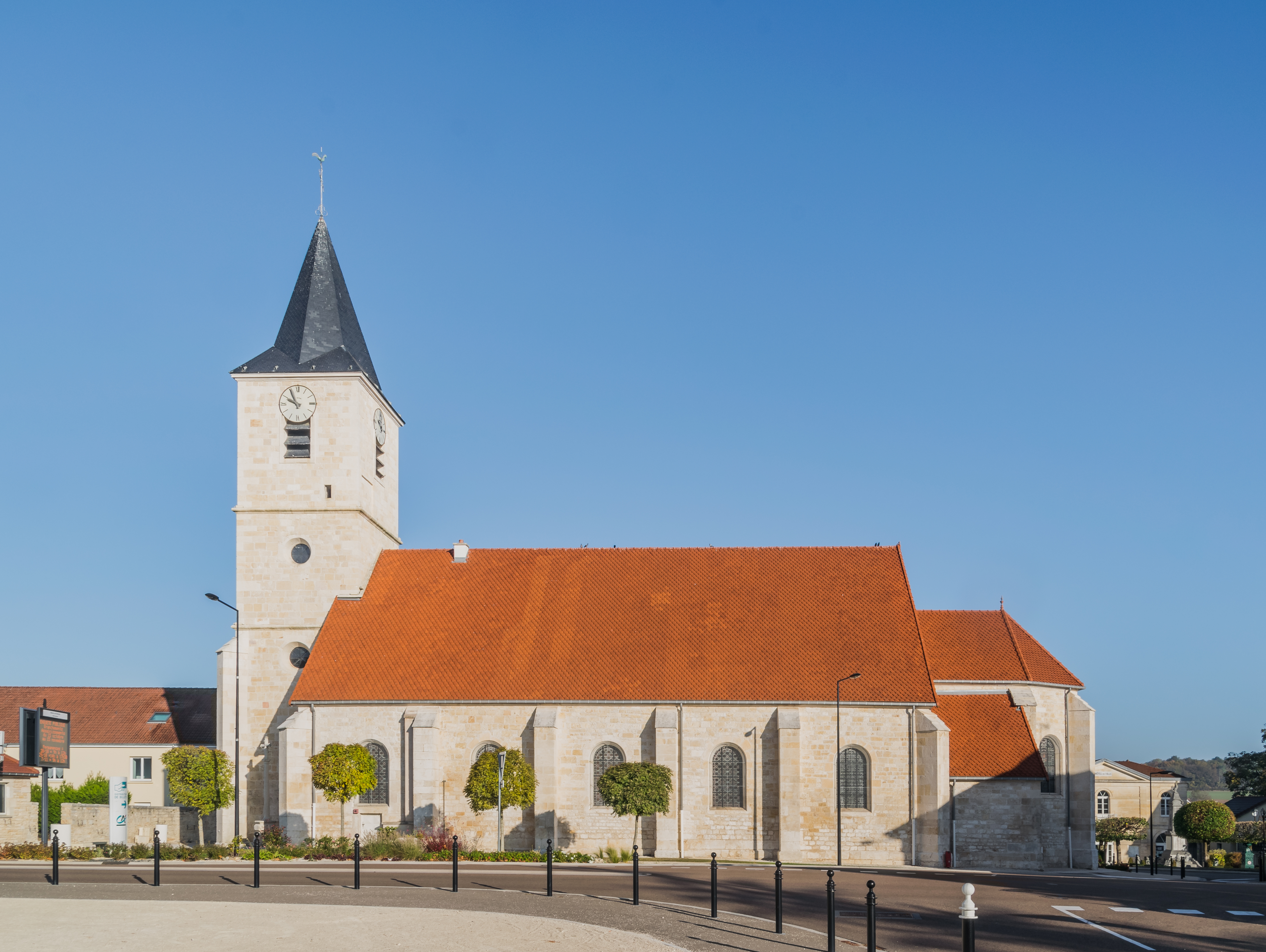
- The church in Biesles

- Coat of arms
- Location of Biesles
- Location within France Location within Grand Est
- Coordinates: 48°05′11″N 5°17′49″E
- Country: France
- Region: Grand Est
- Department: Haute-Marne
- Arrondissement: Chaumont
- Canton: Nogent
- Intercommunality: CA Chaumont

Government
  - Mayor (2020–2026): Michel André
- Area^{1}: 23.84 km^{2} (9.20 sq mi)
- Elevation: 388 m (1,273 ft)
- Population (2023): 1,342
  - Density: 56.29/km^{2} (145.8/sq mi)
- Time zone: UTC+01:00 (CET)
  - Summer (DST): UTC+02:00 (CEST)
- INSEE/Postal code: 52050 /52340
- ^{1} French Land Register data, which excludes lakes, ponds, glaciers > 1 km^{2} (0.386 sq mi or 247 acres) and river estuaries.

Biesles (French pronunciation: [bjɛl]) is a commune in the Haute-Marne department in northeastern France.

== Population ==
Historical population
Year	Pop.	±% p.a.
1968	1,262	—
1975	1,287	+0.28%
1982	1,300	+0.14%
1990	1,396	+0.89%
1999	1,426	+0.24%
2007	1,422	−0.04%
2012	1,383	−0.55%
2017	1,352	−0.45%
2023	1,342	−0.12%
Source: INSEE

== See also ==
- Communes of the Haute-Marne department
