= Ernest Marie Louis Bedel =

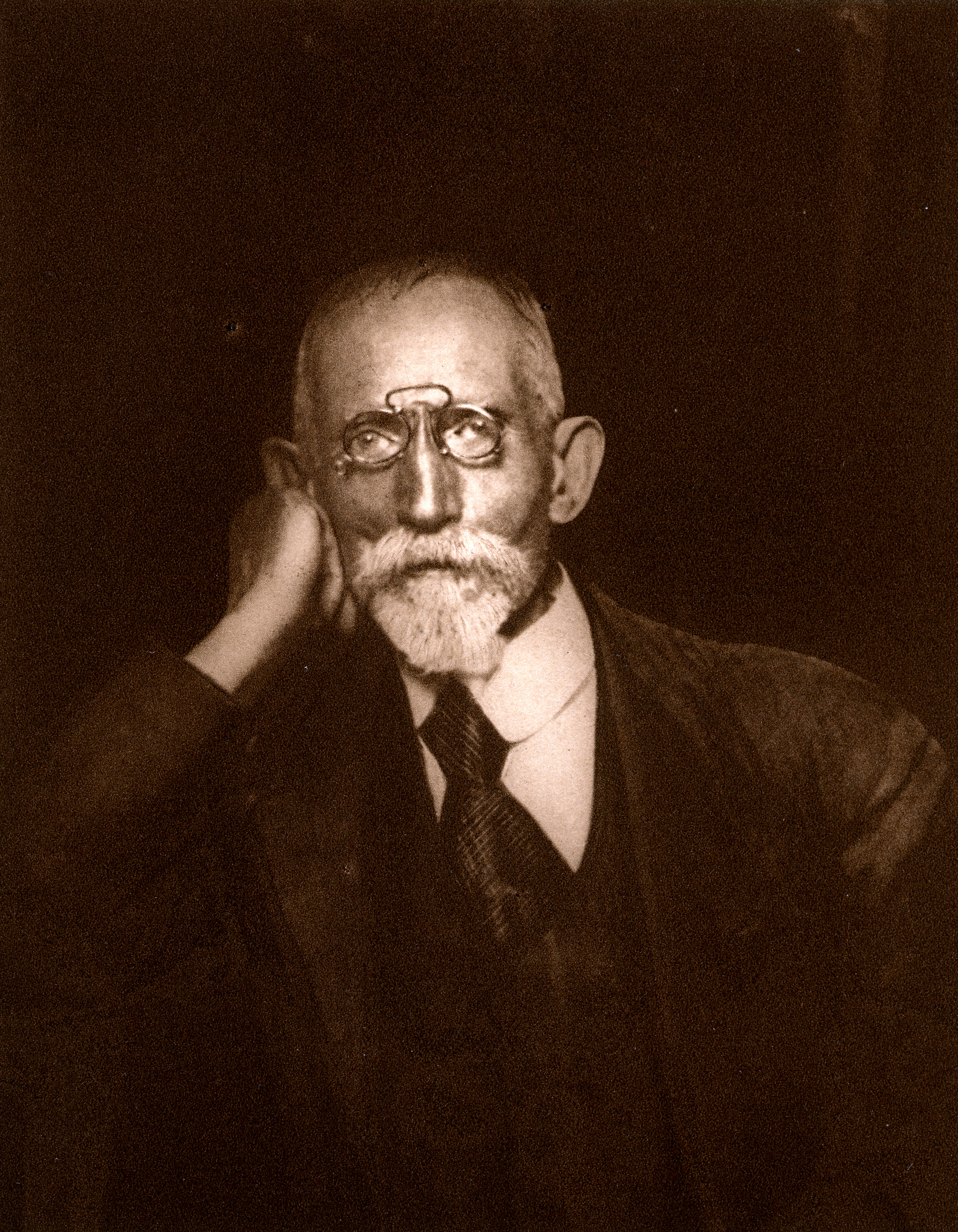
Louis Bedel

Ernest Marie Louis Bedel (16 May 1849, Nantes – 26 January 1922, Paris) was a French entomologist who specialised in Coleoptera.

== Life ==
Louis Bedel studied first in Nantes, then in Paris where the future entomologist Maurice Sédillot (1849-1933) was a fellow student. His father arranged his taking part in natural history sorties where he met great names of natural history like Alcide d'Orbigny (1802-1857) and which were also attended by future scientists in other disciplines like Henry Le Chatelier (1850-1936), Henri d'Orbigny (1845-1915) and Pierre Emile Gounelle (1850-1914). He took part in the war of 1870 before continuing his law studies. Bedel wrote nearly 300 publications mainly devoted to the Coleoptera (beetles). His collection is preserved at the Muséum national d'Histoire naturelle in Paris.

== Sources ==
- Jean Lhoste (1987). Les Entomologistes français. 1750-1950. INRA Éditions : 351 p.
