= Mandres-la-Côte =

- Commune
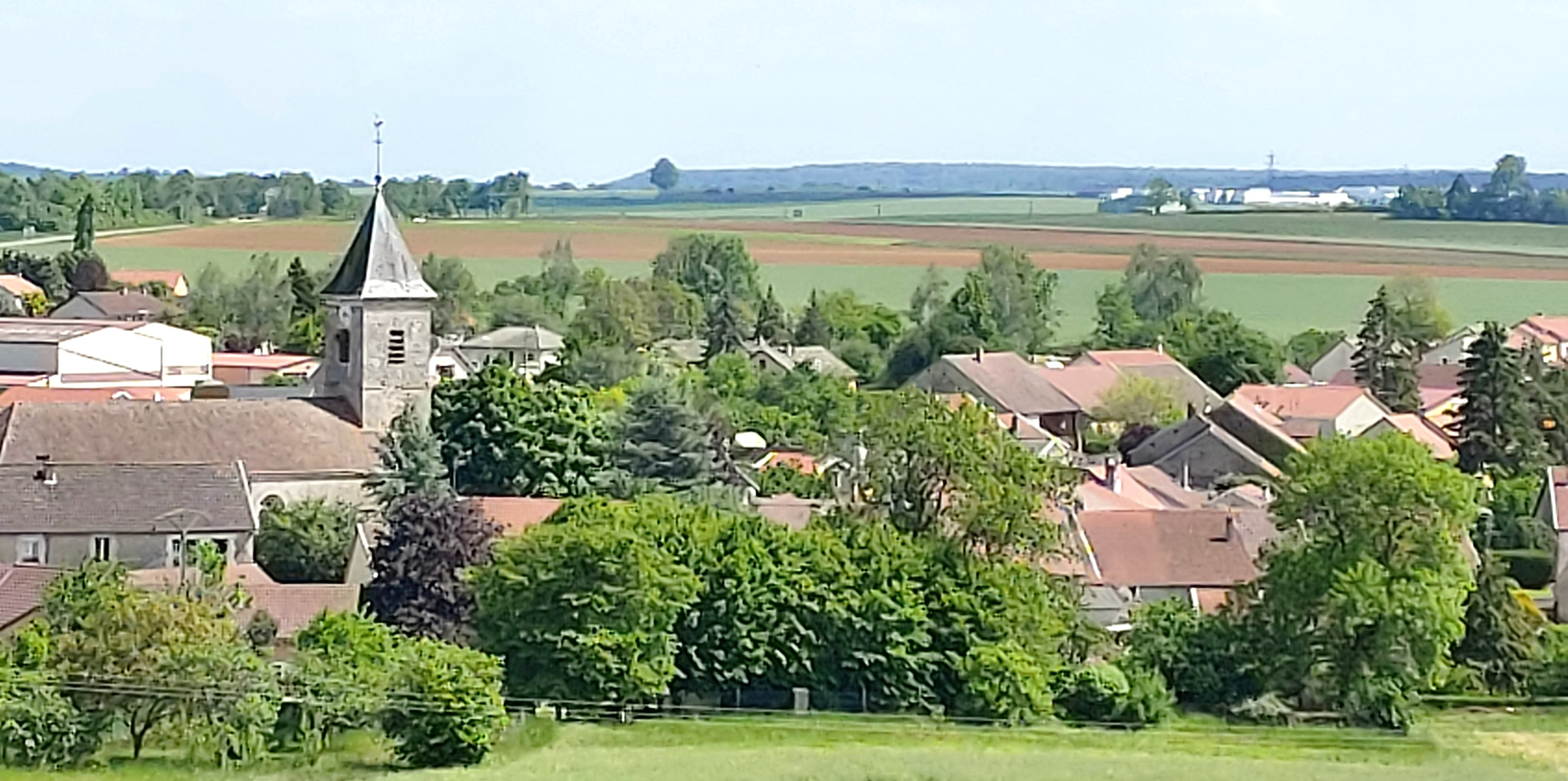
- A general view of Mandres-la-Côte

- Coat of arms
- Location of Mandres-la-Côte
- Location within France Location within Grand Est
- Coordinates: 48°03′47″N 5°20′09″E
- Country: France
- Region: Grand Est
- Department: Haute-Marne
- Arrondissement: Chaumont
- Canton: Nogent
- Intercommunality: CA Chaumont

Government
  - Mayor (2020–2026): Isabelle Lardin
- Area^{1}: 11.3 km^{2} (4.4 sq mi)
- Elevation: 403 m (1,322 ft)
- Population (2023): 556
  - Density: 49.2/km^{2} (127/sq mi)
- Time zone: UTC+01:00 (CET)
  - Summer (DST): UTC+02:00 (CEST)
- INSEE/Postal code: 52305 /52800
- ^{1} French Land Register data, which excludes lakes, ponds, glaciers > 1 km^{2} (0.386 sq mi or 247 acres) and river estuaries.

Mandres-la-Côte (French pronunciation: [mɑ̃dʁ la kot]) is a commune in the Haute-Marne department in north-eastern France.

== See also ==
- Communes of the Haute-Marne department
