= Dampierre, Haute-Marne =

Dampierre
- Commune
- Coat of arms
- Location of Dampierre
- Location within France Location within Grand Est
- Coordinates: 47°57′17″N 5°23′45″E
- Country: France
- Region: Grand Est
- Department: Haute-Marne
- Arrondissement: Langres
- Canton: Nogent
- Intercommunality: Grand Langres

Government
  - Mayor (2020–2026): Jean-Louis Courtoux
- Area^{1}: 16.39 km^{2} (6.33 sq mi)
- Elevation: 350 m (1,150 ft)
- Highest elevation: 512 m (1,680 ft)
- Lowest elevation: 342 m (1,122 ft)
- Population (2023): 382
  - Density: 23.3/km^{2} (60.4/sq mi)
- Time zone: UTC+01:00 (CET)
  - Summer (DST): UTC+02:00 (CEST)
- INSEE/Postal code: 52163 /52360
- ^{1} French Land Register data, which excludes lakes, ponds, glaciers > 1 km^{2} (0.386 sq mi or 247 acres) and river estuaries.

Dampierre (French pronunciation: [dɑ̃pjɛʁ]) is a commune in the Haute-Marne department in north-eastern France.

== Demography ==
Historical population
Year	Pop.	±% p.a.
1968	334	—
1975	333	−0.04%
1982	340	+0.30%
1990	339	−0.04%
1999	371	+1.01%
2007	361	−0.34%
2012	381	+1.08%
2017	387	+0.31%
2023	382	−0.22%
Source: INSEE

== See also ==
- Communes of the Haute-Marne department
