= Esnouveaux =

- Commune
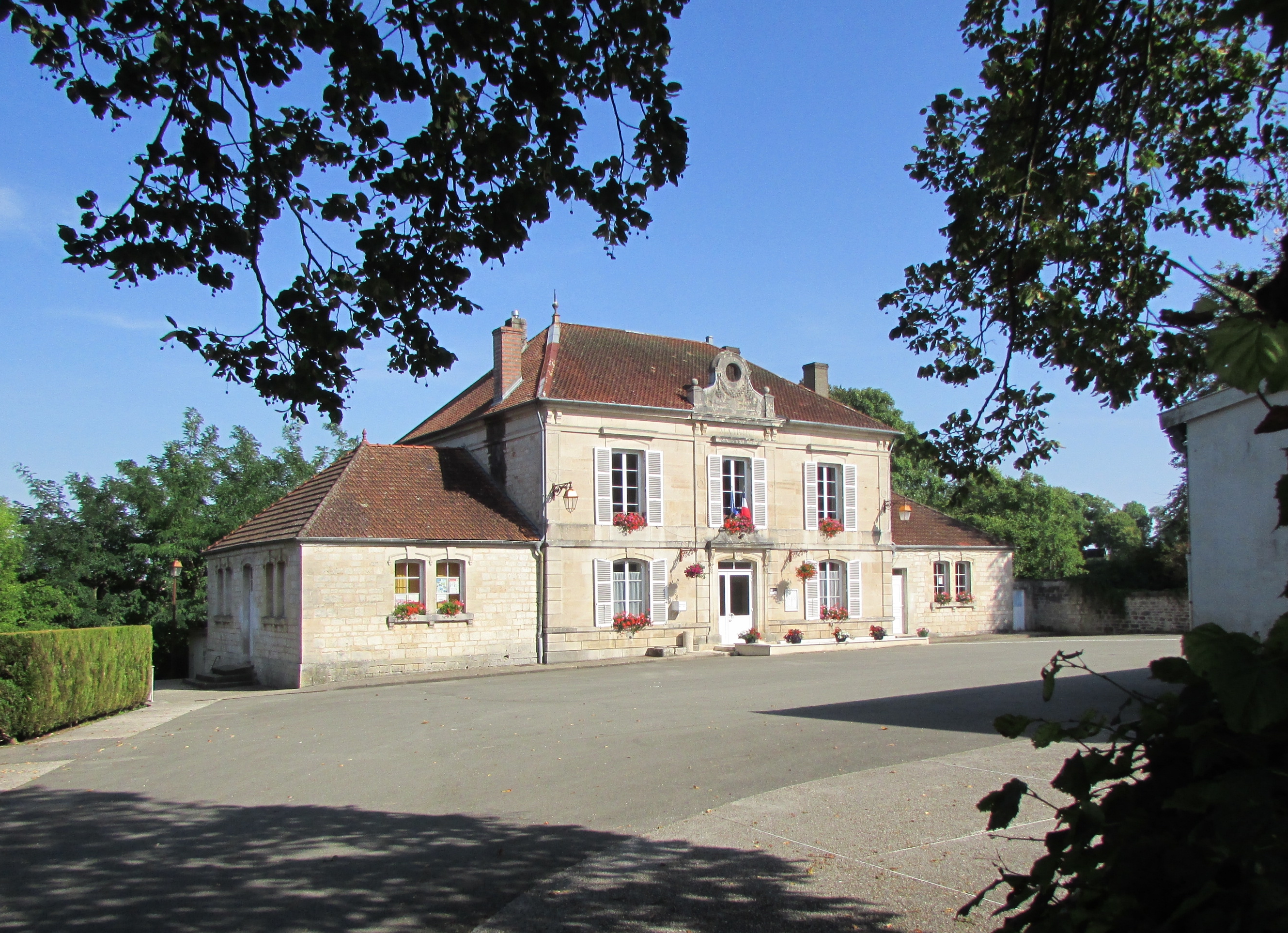
- The town hall in Esnouveaux
- Location of Esnouveaux
- Location within France Location within Grand Est
- Coordinates: 48°07′41″N 5°21′05″E
- Country: France
- Region: Grand Est
- Department: Haute-Marne
- Arrondissement: Chaumont
- Canton: Nogent
- Intercommunality: CA Chaumont

Government
  - Mayor (2024–2026): Laurent Fournet
- Area^{1}: 16.87 km^{2} (6.51 sq mi)
- Elevation: 380 m (1,250 ft)
- Population (2023): 301
  - Density: 17.8/km^{2} (46.2/sq mi)
- Time zone: UTC+01:00 (CET)
  - Summer (DST): UTC+02:00 (CEST)
- INSEE/Postal code: 52190 /52340
- ^{1} French Land Register data, which excludes lakes, ponds, glaciers > 1 km^{2} (0.386 sq mi or 247 acres) and river estuaries.

Esnouveaux is a commune in the Haute-Marne department in north-eastern France.

== See also ==
- Communes of the Haute-Marne department
