= Ageville =

- Commune
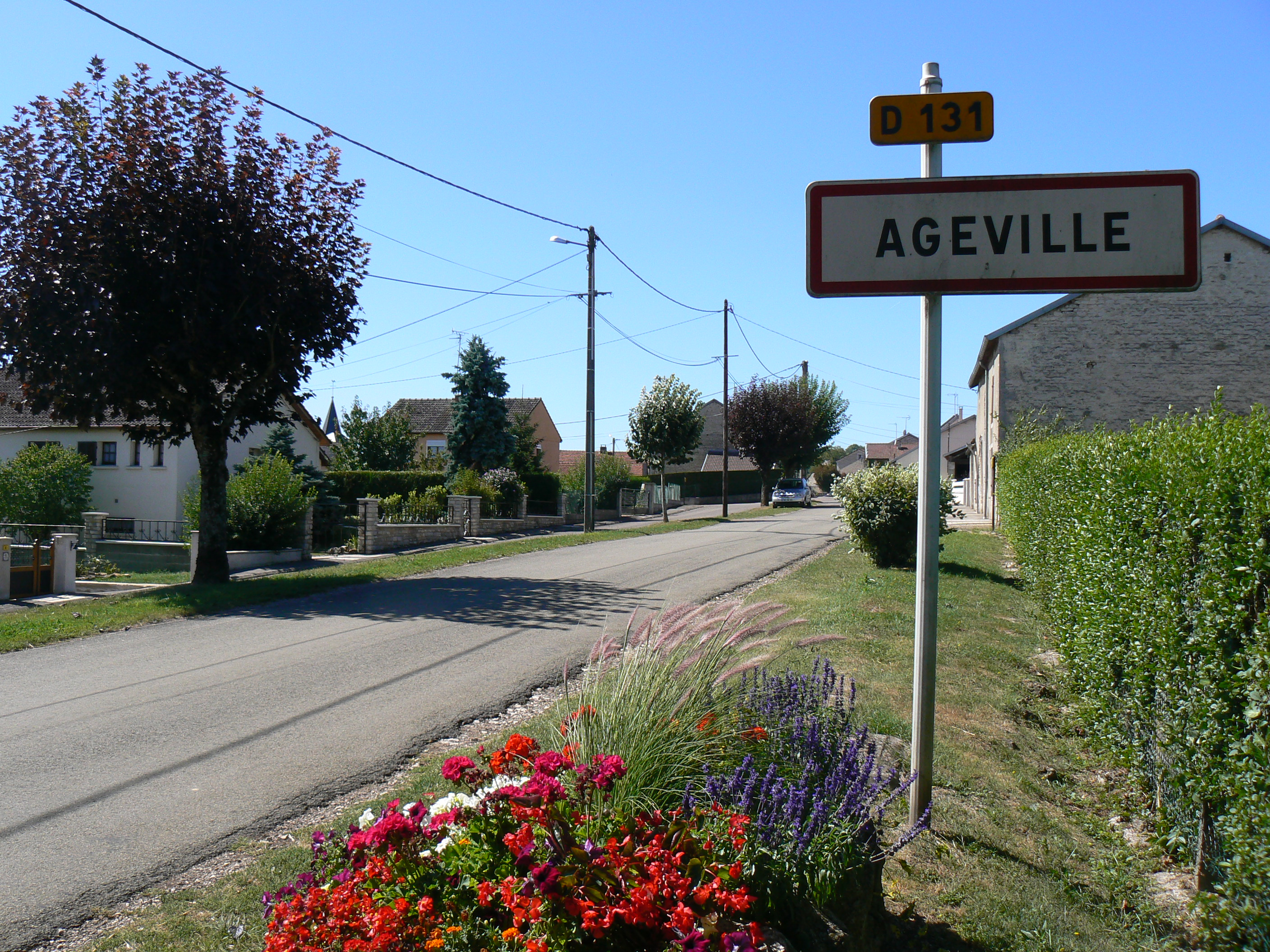
- The road into Ageville
- Location of Ageville
- Location within France Location within Grand Est
- Coordinates: 48°06′38″N 5°21′23″E
- Country: France
- Region: Grand Est
- Department: Haute-Marne
- Arrondissement: Chaumont
- Canton: Nogent
- Intercommunality: CA Chaumont

Government
  - Mayor (2020–2026): Guy Urschel
- Area^{1}: 19.55 km^{2} (7.55 sq mi)
- Elevation: 395 m (1,296 ft)
- Population (2023): 290
  - Density: 15/km^{2} (38/sq mi)
- Time zone: UTC+01:00 (CET)
  - Summer (DST): UTC+02:00 (CEST)
- INSEE/Postal code: 52001 /52340
- ^{1} French Land Register data, which excludes lakes, ponds, glaciers > 1 km^{2} (0.386 sq mi or 247 acres) and river estuaries.

Ageville (French pronunciation: [aʒvil]) is a commune in the Haute-Marne department in the Grand Est region in northeastern France.

== Population ==
Historical population
| Year | Pop. | ±% p.a. |
|---|---|---|
| 1968 | 234 | — |
| 1975 | 240 | +0.36% |
| 1982 | 310 | +3.72% |
| 1990 | 297 | −0.53% |
| 1999 | 292 | −0.19% |
| 2007 | 305 | +0.55% |
| 2012 | 309 | +0.26% |
| 2017 | 309 | +0.00% |
| 2023 | 290 | −1.05% |
Source: INSEE

== See also ==
- Communes of the Haute-Marne department
