= Neuilly-l'Évêque =

- Commune
- Coat of arms
- Location of Neuilly-l'Évêque
- Location within France Location within Grand Est
- Coordinates: 47°55′03″N 5°26′29″E
- Country: France
- Region: Grand Est
- Department: Haute-Marne
- Arrondissement: Langres
- Canton: Nogent
- Intercommunality: Grand Langres

Government
  - Mayor (2020–2026): Eric Oudot
- Area^{1}: 23.76 km^{2} (9.17 sq mi)
- Elevation: 350 m (1,150 ft)
- Highest elevation: 481 m (1,578 ft)
- Lowest elevation: 338 m (1,109 ft)
- Population (2023): 601
  - Density: 25.3/km^{2} (65.5/sq mi)
- Time zone: UTC+01:00 (CET)
  - Summer (DST): UTC+02:00 (CEST)
- INSEE/Postal code: 52348 /52360
- ^{1} French Land Register data, which excludes lakes, ponds, glaciers > 1 km^{2} (0.386 sq mi or 247 acres) and river estuaries.

Neuilly-l'Évêque (French pronunciation: [nøji levɛk]) is a commune in the Haute-Marne department in north-eastern France.

== See also ==
- Communes of the Haute-Marne department
