= Charmes, Haute-Marne =

Charmes
- Commune
- Location of Charmes
- Location within France Location within Grand Est
- Coordinates: 47°55′16″N 5°21′06″E
- Country: France
- Region: Grand Est
- Department: Haute-Marne
- Arrondissement: Langres
- Canton: Nogent
- Intercommunality: Grand Langres

Government
  - Mayor (2020–2026): Bernard Joffrain
- Area^{1}: 6.04 km^{2} (2.33 sq mi)
- Elevation: 350 m (1,150 ft)
- Highest elevation: 456 m (1,496 ft)
- Lowest elevation: 321 m (1,053 ft)
- Population (2023): 151
  - Density: 25.0/km^{2} (64.7/sq mi)
- Time zone: UTC+01:00 (CET)
  - Summer (DST): UTC+02:00 (CEST)
- INSEE/Postal code: 52108 /52360
- ^{1} French Land Register data, which excludes lakes, ponds, glaciers > 1 km^{2} (0.386 sq mi or 247 acres) and river estuaries.

Charmes (French pronunciation: [ʃaʁm]) is a commune in the Haute-Marne department in north-eastern France.

== See also ==
- Communes of the Haute-Marne department
