= Nogent, Haute-Marne =

Nogent
- Commune
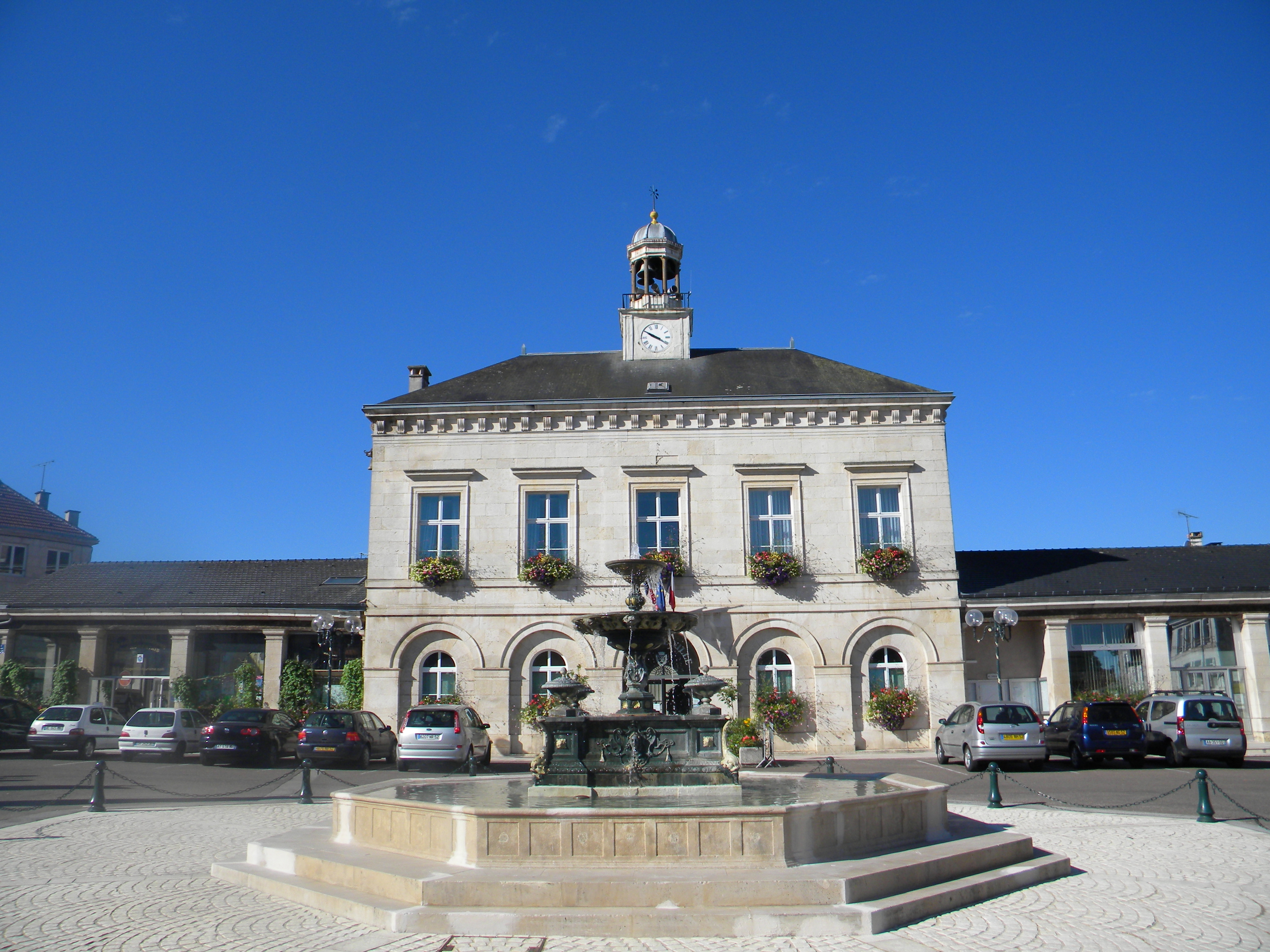
- The town hall in Nogent

- Coat of arms
- Location of Nogent
- Location within France Location within Grand Est
- Coordinates: 48°01′49″N 5°20′46″E
- Country: France
- Region: Grand Est
- Department: Haute-Marne
- Arrondissement: Chaumont
- Canton: Nogent
- Intercommunality: CA Chaumont

Government
  - Mayor (2023–2026): Thierry Ponce
- Area^{1}: 54.63 km^{2} (21.09 sq mi)
- Elevation: 410 m (1,350 ft)
- Highest elevation: 410 m (1,350 ft)
- Population (2023): 3,550
  - Density: 65.0/km^{2} (168/sq mi)
- Demonym(s): Nogentais, Nogentaises
- Time zone: UTC+01:00 (CET)
  - Summer (DST): UTC+02:00 (CEST)
- INSEE/Postal code: 52353 /52800
- Website: villedenogent52.fr
- ^{1} French Land Register data, which excludes lakes, ponds, glaciers > 1 km^{2} (0.386 sq mi or 247 acres) and river estuaries.

Nogent (French pronunciation: [nɔʒɑ̃]) is a commune in the Haute-Marne department, northeastern France.

It is known since the 18th century for the manufacture of knives; the local Musée de la Coutellerie is dedicated to the history of knife making in Nogent.

== Population ==
Historical population
Year	Pop.	±% p.a.
1968	5,142	—
1975	5,265	+0.34%
1982	5,318	+0.14%
1990	4,754	−1.39%
1999	4,343	−1.00%
2007	4,046	−0.88%
2012	3,926	−0.60%
2017	3,752	−0.90%
2023	3,550	−0.92%
Source: INSEE

== See also ==
- Communes of the Haute-Marne department
