= Andilly-en-Bassigny =

- Commune
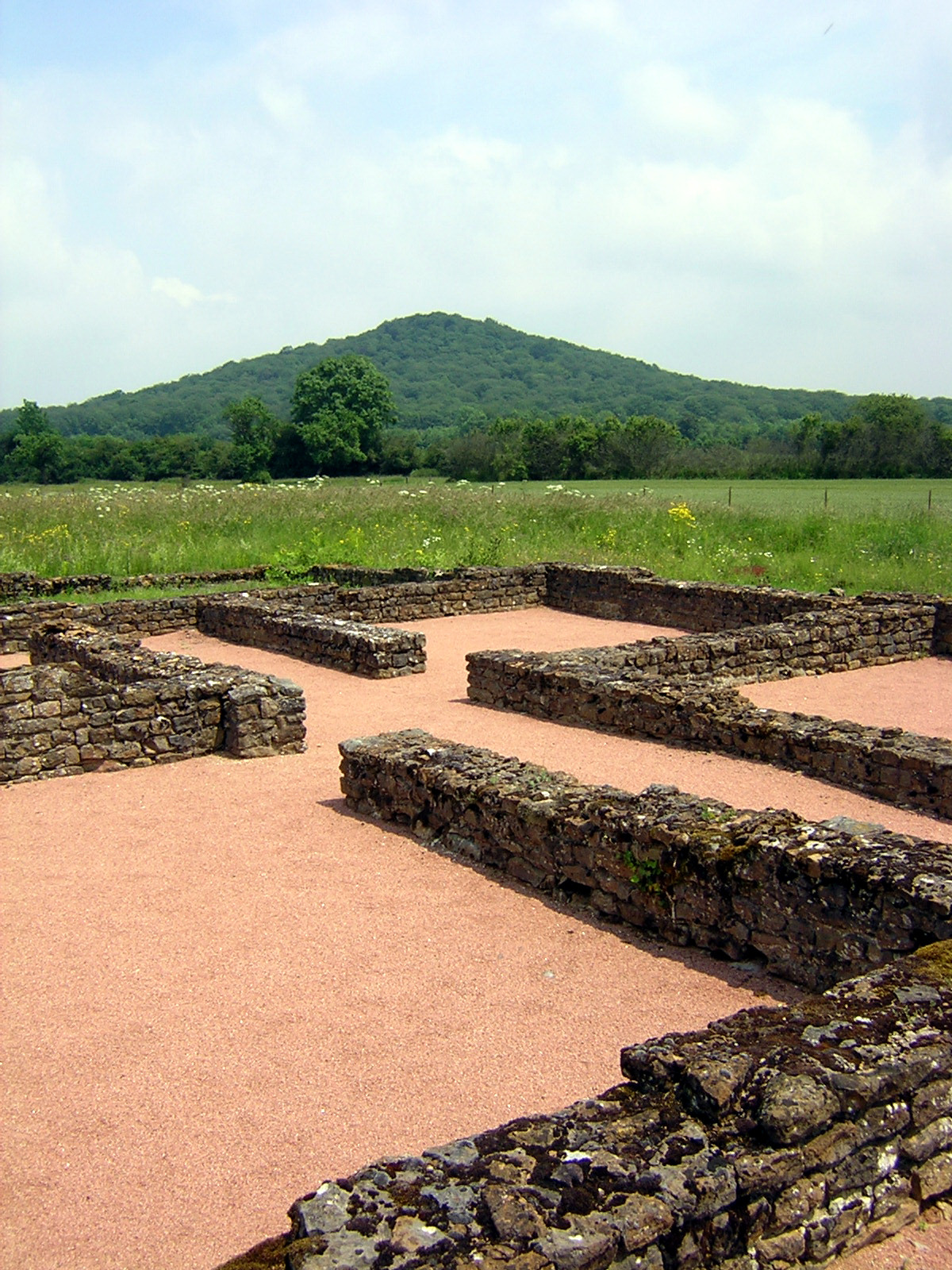
- The remains of the Roman villa in Andilly-en-Bassigny
- Location of Andilly-en-Bassigny
- Location within France Location within Grand Est
- Coordinates: 47°55′25″N 5°31′33″E
- Country: France
- Region: Grand Est
- Department: Haute-Marne
- Arrondissement: Langres
- Canton: Nogent
- Intercommunality: Grand Langres

Government
  - Mayor (2020–2026): Gilles Huot
- Area^{1}: 8.42 km^{2} (3.25 sq mi)
- Elevation: 350 m (1,150 ft)
- Highest elevation: 452 m (1,483 ft)
- Lowest elevation: 310 m (1,020 ft)
- Population (2023): 108
  - Density: 12.8/km^{2} (33.2/sq mi)
- Time zone: UTC+01:00 (CET)
  - Summer (DST): UTC+02:00 (CEST)
- INSEE/Postal code: 52009 /52360
- ^{1} French Land Register data, which excludes lakes, ponds, glaciers > 1 km^{2} (0.386 sq mi or 247 acres) and river estuaries.

Andilly-en-Bassigny (French pronunciation: [ɑ̃diji ɑ̃ basiɲi]) is a commune in the Haute-Marne department in the Grand Est region in northeastern France.

== Population ==
Historical population
Year	Pop.	±% p.a.
1968	182	—
1975	128	−4.90%
1982	128	+0.00%
1990	112	−1.66%
1999	104	−0.82%
2007	108	+0.47%
2012	116	+1.44%
2017	108	−1.42%
2023	108	+0.00%
Source: INSEE

== See also ==
- Communes of the Haute-Marne department
