= Formigny =

Commune in Calvados, France

- Part of Formigny La Bataille
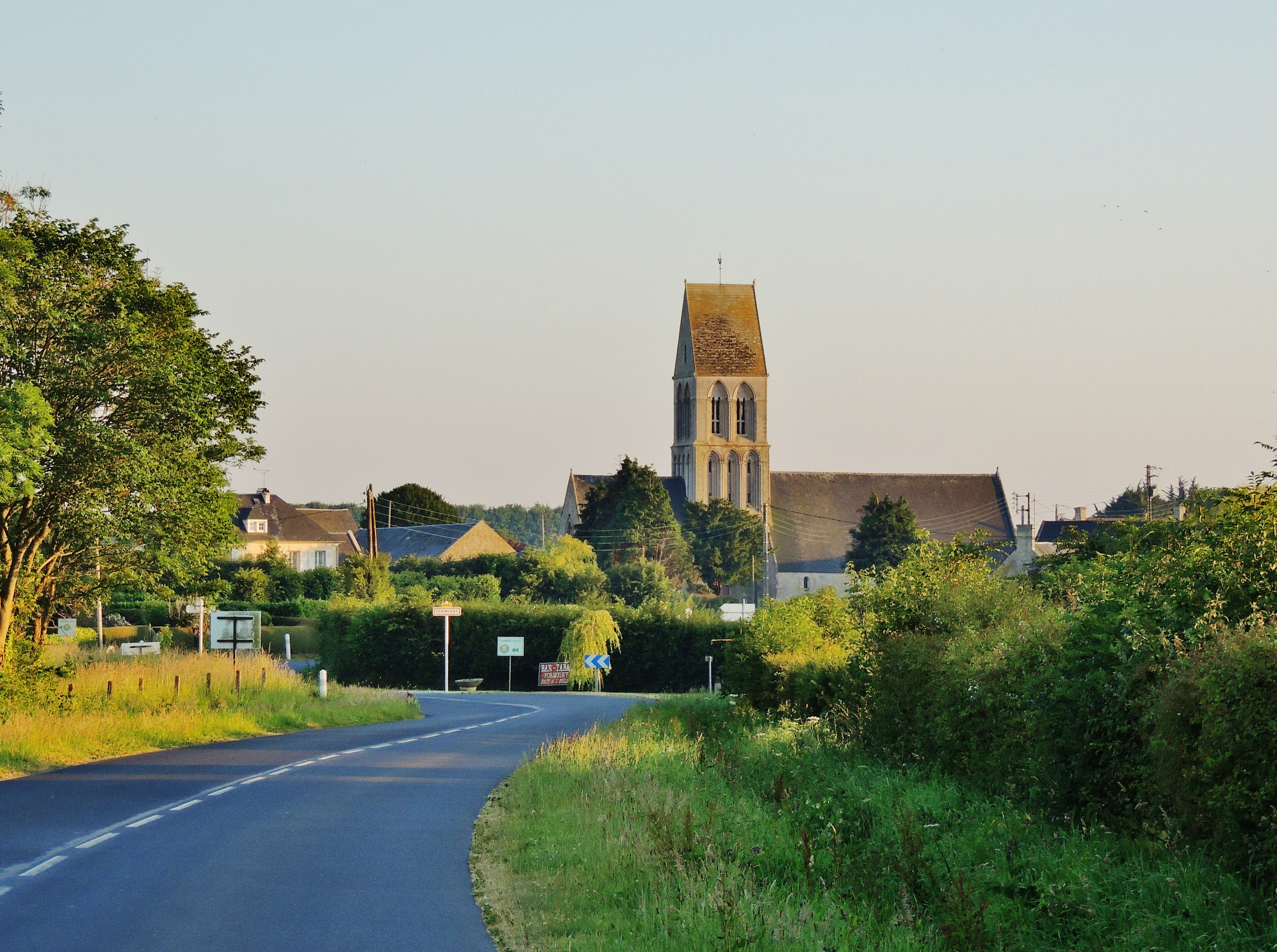
- The Town of Formigny, with the church.
- Location of Formigny
- Location within France Location within Normandy
- Coordinates: 49°20′14″N 0°53′52″W
- Country: France
- Region: Normandy
- Department: Calvados
- Arrondissement: Bayeux
- Canton: Trévières
- Commune: Formigny La Bataille
- Area^{1}: 10.86 km^{2} (4.19 sq mi)
- Highest elevation: 77 m (253 ft)
- Lowest elevation: 2 m (6.6 ft)
- Population (2019): 252
  - Density: 23.2/km^{2} (60.1/sq mi)
- Time zone: UTC+01:00 (CET)
  - Summer (DST): UTC+02:00 (CEST)
- Postal code: 14710
- ^{1} French Land Register data, which excludes lakes, ponds, glaciers > 1 km^{2} (0.386 sq mi or 247 acres) and river estuaries.

Formigny (French pronunciation: [fɔʁmiɲi]) is a former commune in the Calvados department in the Normandy region in northwestern France. On 1 January 2017, it was merged into the new commune Formigny La Bataille.

== History ==
- 15 April 1450: Battle of Formigny. The battle of Formigny took place here and the French victory, marked the end of the Hundred Years War in Normandy.
- In 1823, Formigny (487 inhabitants in 1821) absorbed Véret (70 inhabitants), in the northwest of the territory.
- In 1858, Engranville (228 inhabitants in 1856) is divided between Formigny - most of the territory - and Trévières, in the southeast.
- 8 June 1944: Formigny was liberated by elements of US 1st Infantry Division during the initial breakout from Omaha Beach.

== Population ==
Historical population

Year	Pop.	±% p.a.
1793	538	—
1800	338	−6.42%
1806	519	+7.41%
1821	487	−0.42%
1831	500	+0.26%
1836	539	+1.51%
1841	537	−0.07%
1846	527	−0.38%
1851	552	+0.93%
1856	491	−2.31%
1861	641	+5.48%
1866	617	−0.76%
1872	600	−0.46%
1876	629	+1.19%
1881	572	−1.88%
1886	540	−1.14%
1891	556	+0.59%
1896	544	−0.44%

Year	Pop.	±% p.a.
1901	540	−0.15%
1906	535	−0.19%
1911	452	−3.32%
1921	418	−0.78%
1926	403	−0.73%
1931	378	−1.27%
1936	383	+0.26%
1946	350	−0.90%
1954	342	−0.29%
1962	324	−0.67%
1968	299	−1.33%
1975	256	−2.19%
1982	241	−0.86%
1990	233	−0.42%
1999	244	+0.51%
2007	257	+0.65%
2012	244	−1.03%
2019	252	+0.46%

Source: EHESS and INSEE (2007-2019)

== See also ==
- Communes of the Calvados department
