= Orbigny-au-Val =

- Commune
- Location of Orbigny-au-Val
- Location within France Location within Grand Est
- Coordinates: 47°53′02″N 5°25′58″E
- Country: France
- Region: Grand Est
- Department: Haute-Marne
- Arrondissement: Langres
- Canton: Nogent

Government
  - Mayor (2020–2026): Daniel Blanchard
- Area^{1}: 7.55 km^{2} (2.92 sq mi)
- Elevation: 350 m (1,150 ft)
- Highest elevation: 427 m (1,401 ft)
- Lowest elevation: 346 m (1,135 ft)
- Population (2023): 95
  - Density: 13/km^{2} (33/sq mi)
- Time zone: UTC+01:00 (CET)
  - Summer (DST): UTC+02:00 (CEST)
- INSEE/Postal code: 52363 /52360
- ^{1} French Land Register data, which excludes lakes, ponds, glaciers > 1 km^{2} (0.386 sq mi or 247 acres) and river estuaries.

Orbigny-au-Val (French pronunciation: [ɔʁbiɲi o val]) is a commune in the Haute-Marne department, northeastern France.

== See also ==
- Communes of the Haute-Marne department
