= Louvières, Haute-Marne =

Louvières
- Commune
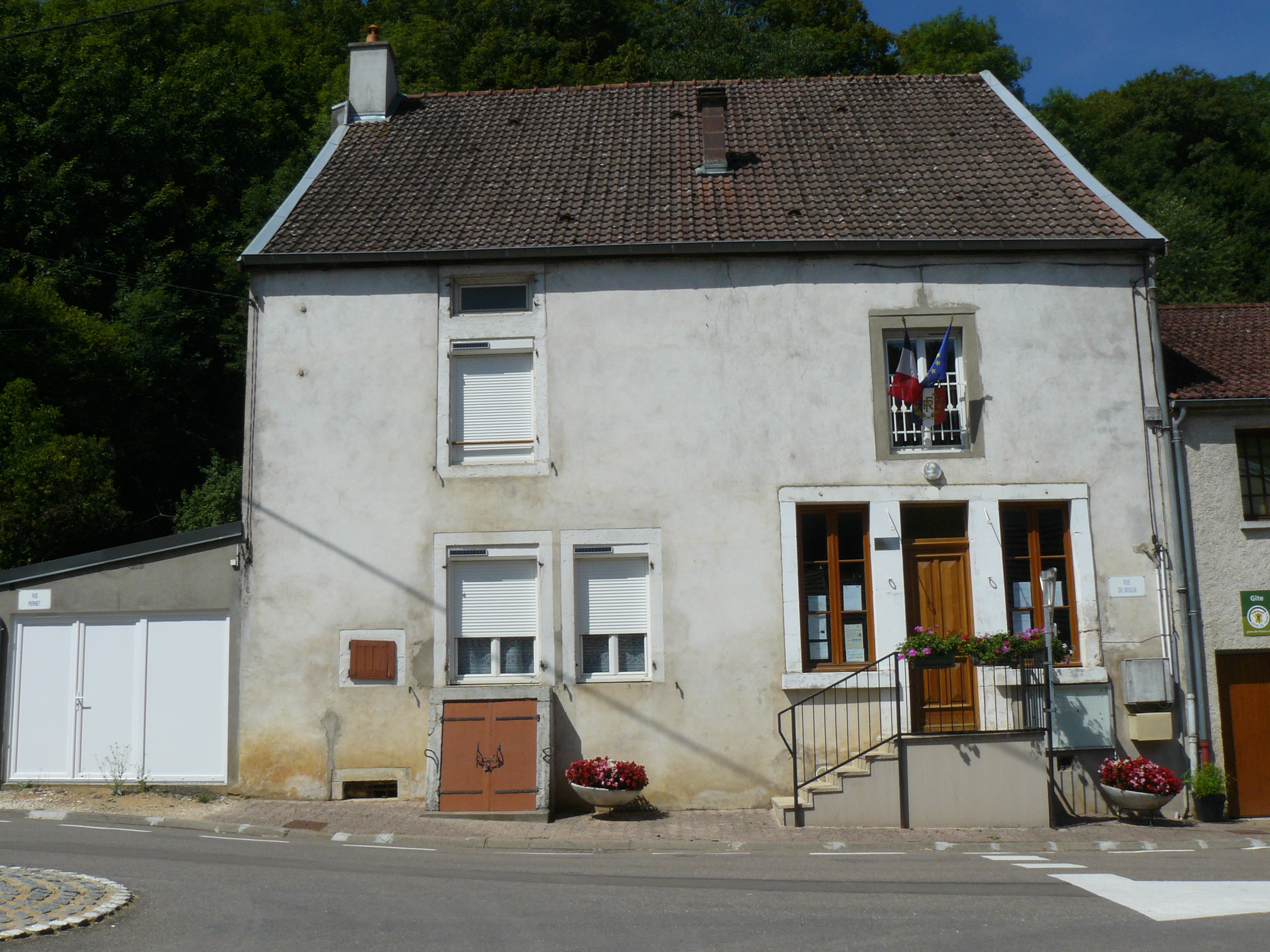
- Town hall
- Location of Louvières
- Location within France Location within Grand Est
- Coordinates: 48°02′06″N 5°16′53″E
- Country: France
- Region: Grand Est
- Department: Haute-Marne
- Arrondissement: Chaumont
- Canton: Nogent
- Intercommunality: CA Chaumont

Government
  - Mayor (2020–2026): Anna Stafiniak
- Area^{1}: 8.62 km^{2} (3.33 sq mi)
- Elevation: 298 m (978 ft)
- Population (2023): 87
  - Density: 10/km^{2} (26/sq mi)
- Time zone: UTC+01:00 (CET)
  - Summer (DST): UTC+02:00 (CEST)
- INSEE/Postal code: 52295 /52800
- ^{1} French Land Register data, which excludes lakes, ponds, glaciers > 1 km^{2} (0.386 sq mi or 247 acres) and river estuaries.

Louvières (French pronunciation: [luvjɛʁ]) is a commune in the Haute-Marne department in north-eastern France.

Inhabitants are known as Hallebardiers (male) or Hallebardières (female) in French.

== See also ==
- Communes of the Haute-Marne department
