= D'Orbigny meteorite =

Meteorite found in Argentina

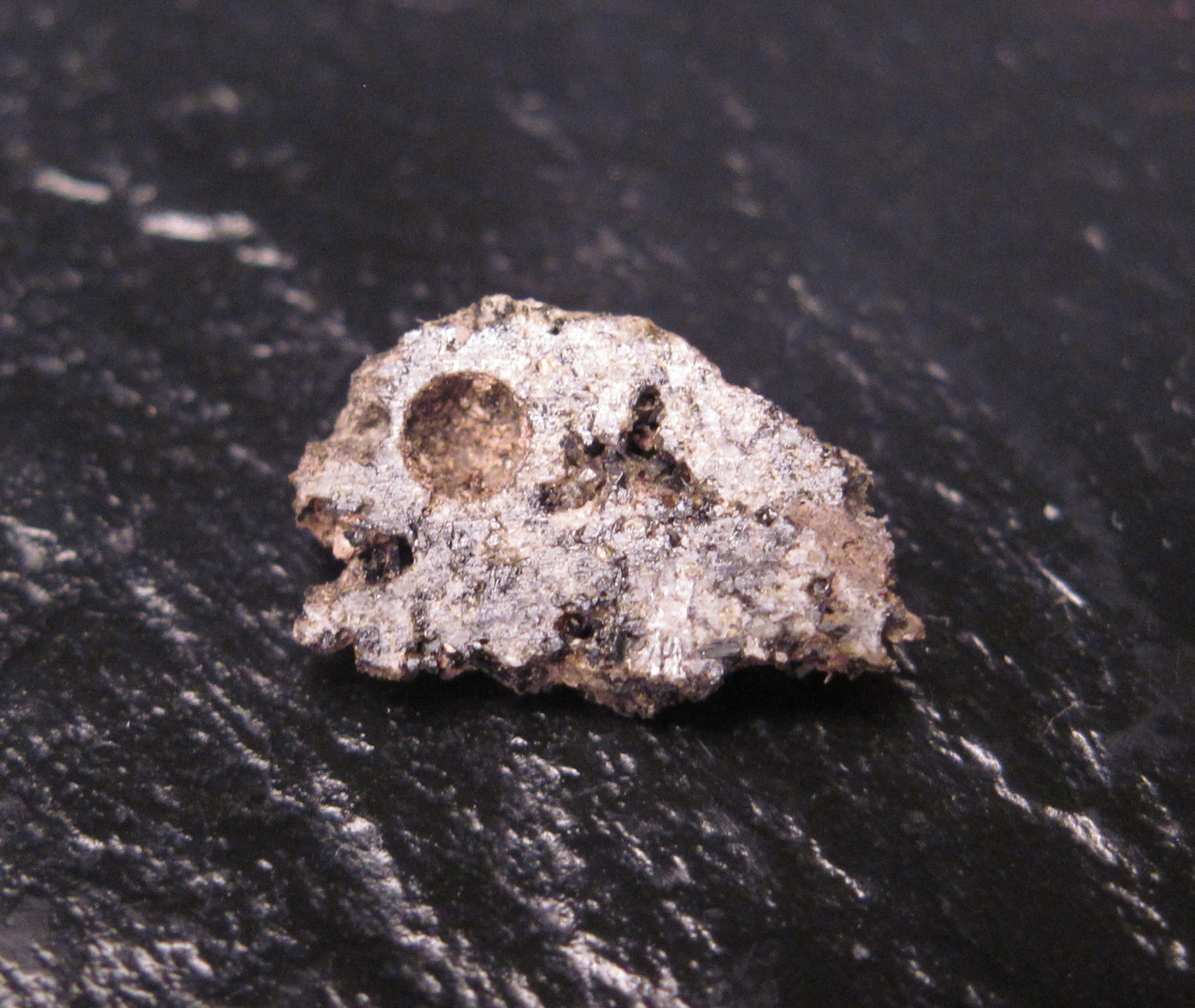
- A fragment of the D'Orbigny meteorite
- Type: Stony
- Class: Achondrite
- Group: Angrite
- Country: Argentina
- Region: Buenos Aires
- Coordinates: 37°40′S 61°39′W
- Observed fall: No
- Found date: 1979-09
- TKW: 16.55 kilograms (36.5 lb)

D'Orbigny meteorite was found near Buenos Aires, Argentina in September 1979. It is the largest angrite found to date.

== History ==
D'Orbigny was found by a farm worker who hit it while plowing a corn field. Not realising its significance he gave it to the landowner who stored it for about twenty years until reading an article on meteorites prompted him to have it analysed.

As of January 2012 fragments of the meteorite were on sale for US$500/g.

== See also ==
Glossary of meteoritics
