= Sarcey, Haute-Marne =

Sarcey
- Commune
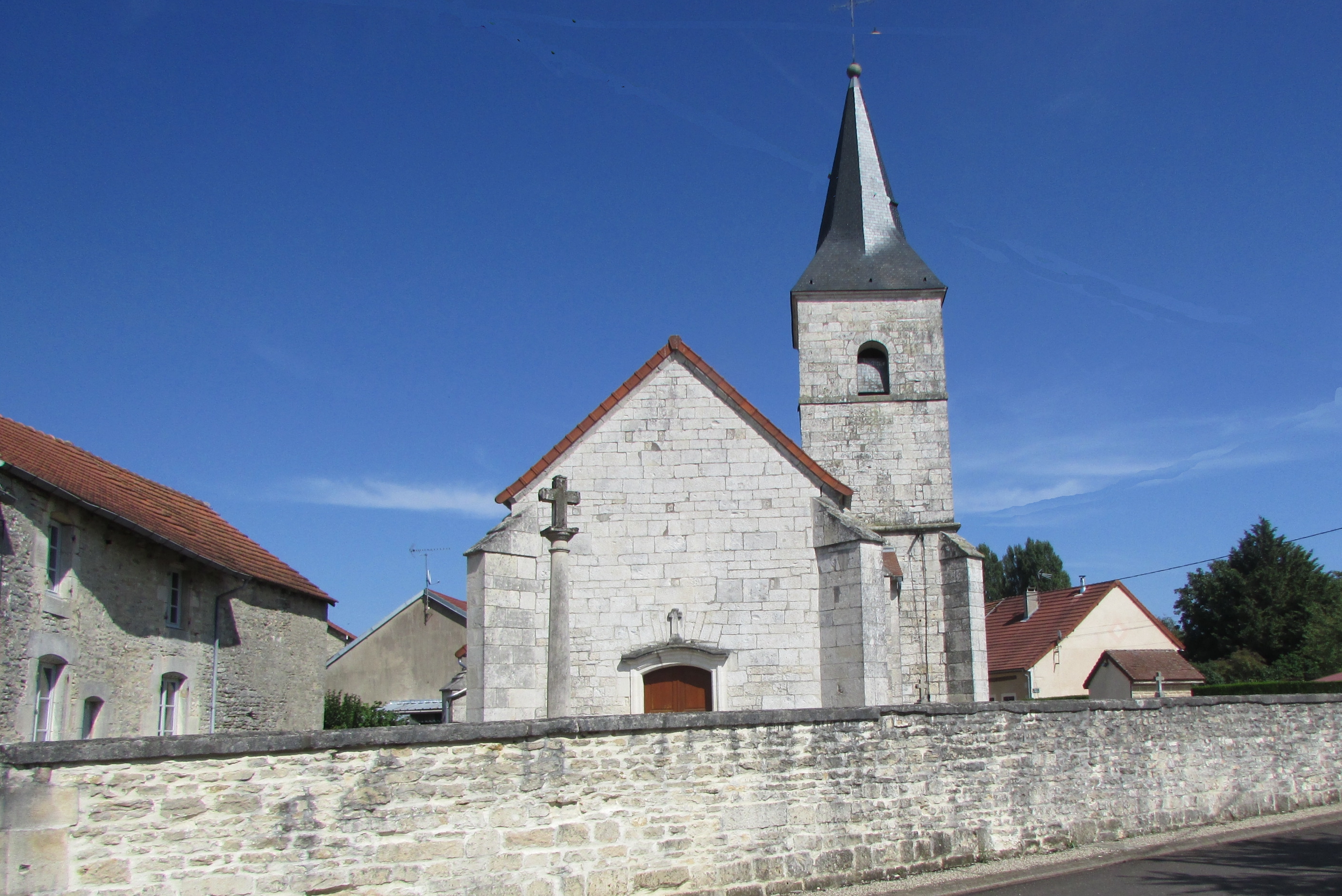
- The church in Sarcey
- Location of Sarcey
- Location within France Location within Grand Est
- Coordinates: 48°03′24″N 5°18′21″E
- Country: France
- Region: Grand Est
- Department: Haute-Marne
- Arrondissement: Chaumont
- Canton: Nogent
- Intercommunality: CA Chaumont

Government
  - Mayor (2020–2026): Franck Trompette
- Area^{1}: 7.22 km^{2} (2.79 sq mi)
- Elevation: 370 m (1,210 ft)
- Population (2023): 97
  - Density: 13/km^{2} (35/sq mi)
- Demonym(s): Sarceyots, Sarceyottes
- Time zone: UTC+01:00 (CET)
  - Summer (DST): UTC+02:00 (CEST)
- INSEE/Postal code: 52459 /52800
- ^{1} French Land Register data, which excludes lakes, ponds, glaciers > 1 km^{2} (0.386 sq mi or 247 acres) and river estuaries.

Sarcey (French pronunciation: [saʁsɛ]) is a commune in the Haute-Marne department in north-eastern France.

== See also ==
- Communes of the Haute-Marne department
