= Orbigny-au-Mont =

- Commune
- Location of Orbigny-au-Mont
- Location within France Location within Grand Est
- Coordinates: 47°52′57″N 5°27′07″E
- Country: France
- Region: Grand Est
- Department: Haute-Marne
- Arrondissement: Langres
- Canton: Nogent
- Intercommunality: Grand Langres

Government
  - Mayor (2023–2026): Michèle Gerbore
- Area^{1}: 9.35 km^{2} (3.61 sq mi)
- Elevation: 420 m (1,380 ft)
- Highest elevation: 441 m (1,447 ft)
- Lowest elevation: 353 m (1,158 ft)
- Population (2023): 138
  - Density: 14.8/km^{2} (38.2/sq mi)
- Time zone: UTC+01:00 (CET)
  - Summer (DST): UTC+02:00 (CEST)
- INSEE/Postal code: 52362 /52360
- ^{1} French Land Register data, which excludes lakes, ponds, glaciers > 1 km^{2} (0.386 sq mi or 247 acres) and river estuaries.

Orbigny-au-Mont (French pronunciation: [ɔʁbiɲi o mɔ̃]) is a commune in the Haute-Marne department, northeastern France.

== See also ==
- Communes of the Haute-Marne department
