= Cuves, Haute-Marne =

Cuves
- Commune
- Location of Cuves
- Location within France Location within Grand Est
- Coordinates: 48°05′43″N 5°26′18″E
- Country: France
- Region: Grand Est
- Department: Haute-Marne
- Arrondissement: Chaumont
- Canton: Nogent
- Intercommunality: CA Chaumont

Government
  - Mayor (2020–2026): Patrice Humblot
- Area^{1}: 5.4 km^{2} (2.1 sq mi)
- Elevation: 346 m (1,135 ft)
- Population (2023): 24
  - Density: 4.4/km^{2} (12/sq mi)
- Time zone: UTC+01:00 (CET)
  - Summer (DST): UTC+02:00 (CEST)
- INSEE/Postal code: 52159 /52240
- ^{1} French Land Register data, which excludes lakes, ponds, glaciers > 1 km^{2} (0.386 sq mi or 247 acres) and river estuaries.

Cuves (French pronunciation: [kyv]) is a commune in the Haute-Marne département in north-eastern France.

== Sights and monuments ==
The Saint Eloi church dates from the 18th century. It houses a processional cross made in 1748 and signed Gillot (a goldsmith from Langres) which has been registered since 1976 as a monument historique French Ministry of Culture.

== See also ==
- Communes of the Haute-Marne department
