= Henri d'Orbigny =

French architect and entomologist

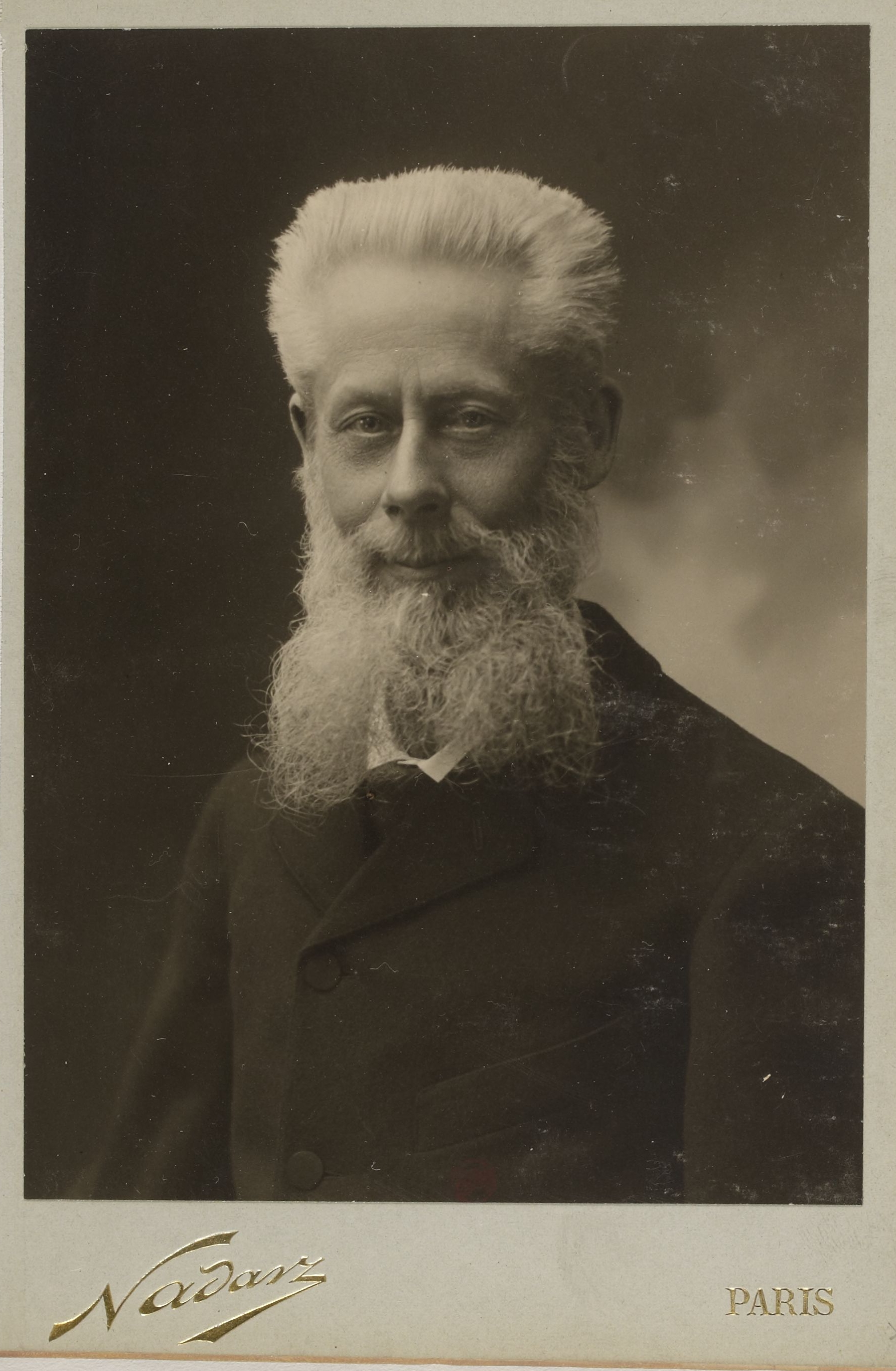
Portrait c. 1905

Henri-Joseph d'Orbigny (16 May 1845, Paris – 29 June 1915, Paris) was a French architect and entomologist, son of the traveller and paleontologist Alcide d'Orbigny (1802–1857).

From 1864 he studied at the École des Beaux-Arts, where he was a pupil of Honoré Daumet (1826–1911). As an architect he built the Musée d'Orbigny-Bernon in La Rochelle. From 1887 to 1889, he was a member of the Société des amis des monuments parisiens.

From the age of 50, he devoted his time to entomology, researching beetles, in particular scarab beetles. His best known written work was Synopsis des Onthophagides d'Afrique (1913), published in the Annales de la Société Entomologique de France. Orbigny was a member of the Société entomologique de France.
