= Aignerville =

- Part of Formigny La Bataille
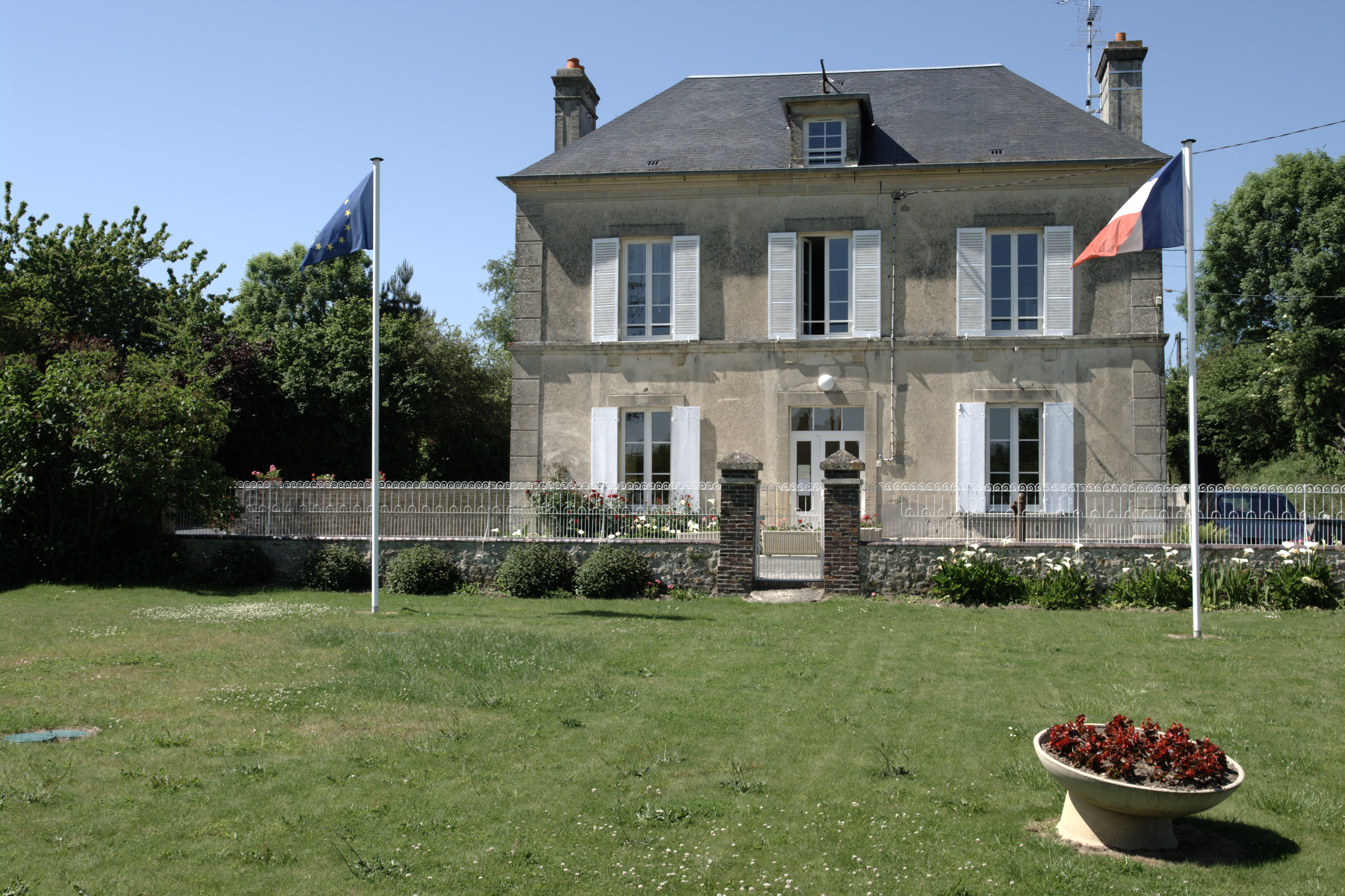
- Town hall
- Location of Aignerville
- Location within France Location within Normandy
- Coordinates: 49°19′13″N 0°55′13″W
- Country: France
- Region: Normandy
- Department: Calvados
- Arrondissement: Bayeux
- Canton: Trévières
- Commune: Formigny La Bataille
- Area^{1}: 4.35 km^{2} (1.68 sq mi)
- Elevation: 20 m (66 ft)
- Highest elevation: 54 m (177 ft)
- Lowest elevation: 1 m (3.3 ft)
- Population (2019): 204
  - Density: 46.9/km^{2} (121/sq mi)
- Time zone: UTC+01:00 (CET)
  - Summer (DST): UTC+02:00 (CEST)
- Postal code: 14710
- ^{1} French Land Register data, which excludes lakes, ponds, glaciers > 1 km^{2} (0.386 sq mi or 247 acres) and river estuaries.

Aignerville (French pronunciation: [ɛɲɛʁvil]) is a former commune in the Calvados department in the Normandy region of northwestern France. On 1 January 2017, it was merged into the new commune Formigny La Bataille.

== Geography ==
Aignerville is located in the Regional Natural Park of Marshes of Cotentin and Bessin, two kilometres north-west of Trevieres and 16 km east by north-east of Bayeux in the valley of the Aure. The commune is bisected in the northern part from west to east by Route nationale N13 Motorway (E46) which runs between Carentan and Bayeux. Aignerville village is reached by road D198 from Asnieres-en-Bessin in the north which passes through the length of the commune and the village and continues south to join the D124 on the southern border. The commune consists almost entirely of farmland with the villages of Carrefour-Berigot, La Grande Route, and Chapelle-Saint-Louis along the north of the motorway and Normanville, Hameau-Lair, La Croix-Toutin, and Aignerville to the south.

The Ruisseau-de-Formigny river flows from south to north through the commune into the Aure Interieur which flows from the east forming the south-eastern border of the commune. In the south of the commune is a network of irrigation canals which is the beginning of a much larger network outside the commune.

== Administration ==
List of Successive Mayors of Aignerville

From	To	Name	Party	Position
1995	2017	Jean-Pierre Marie	SE	Mechanic

== Population ==
The inhabitants of the commune are known as Aignervillais or Aignervillaises in French.

Historical population
Year	Pop.	±% p.a.
2006	136	—
2011	200	+8.02%
2019	204	+0.25%
Source: INSEE

== Sites and monuments ==
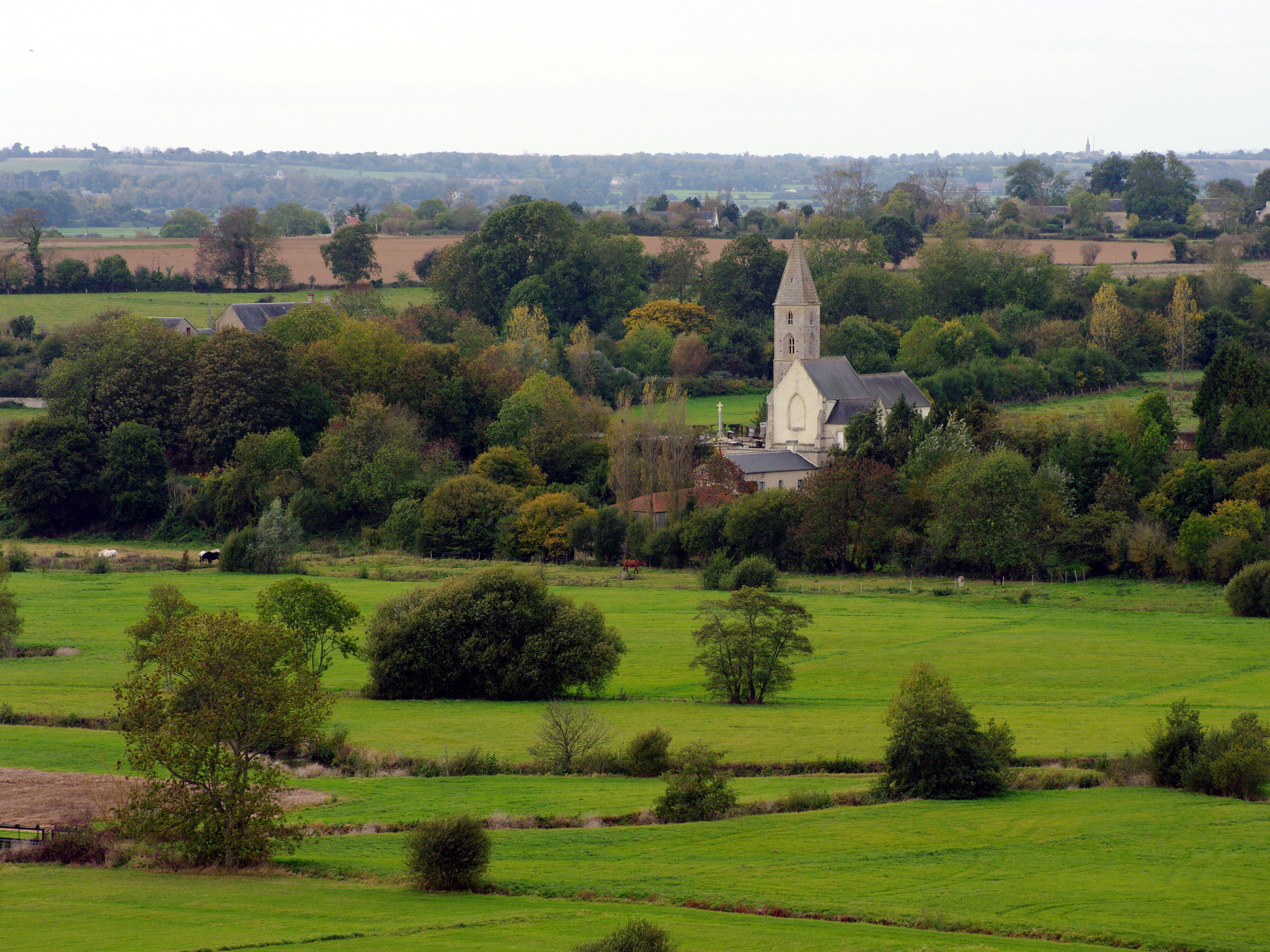
General view of Aignerville with Saint Peter's Church

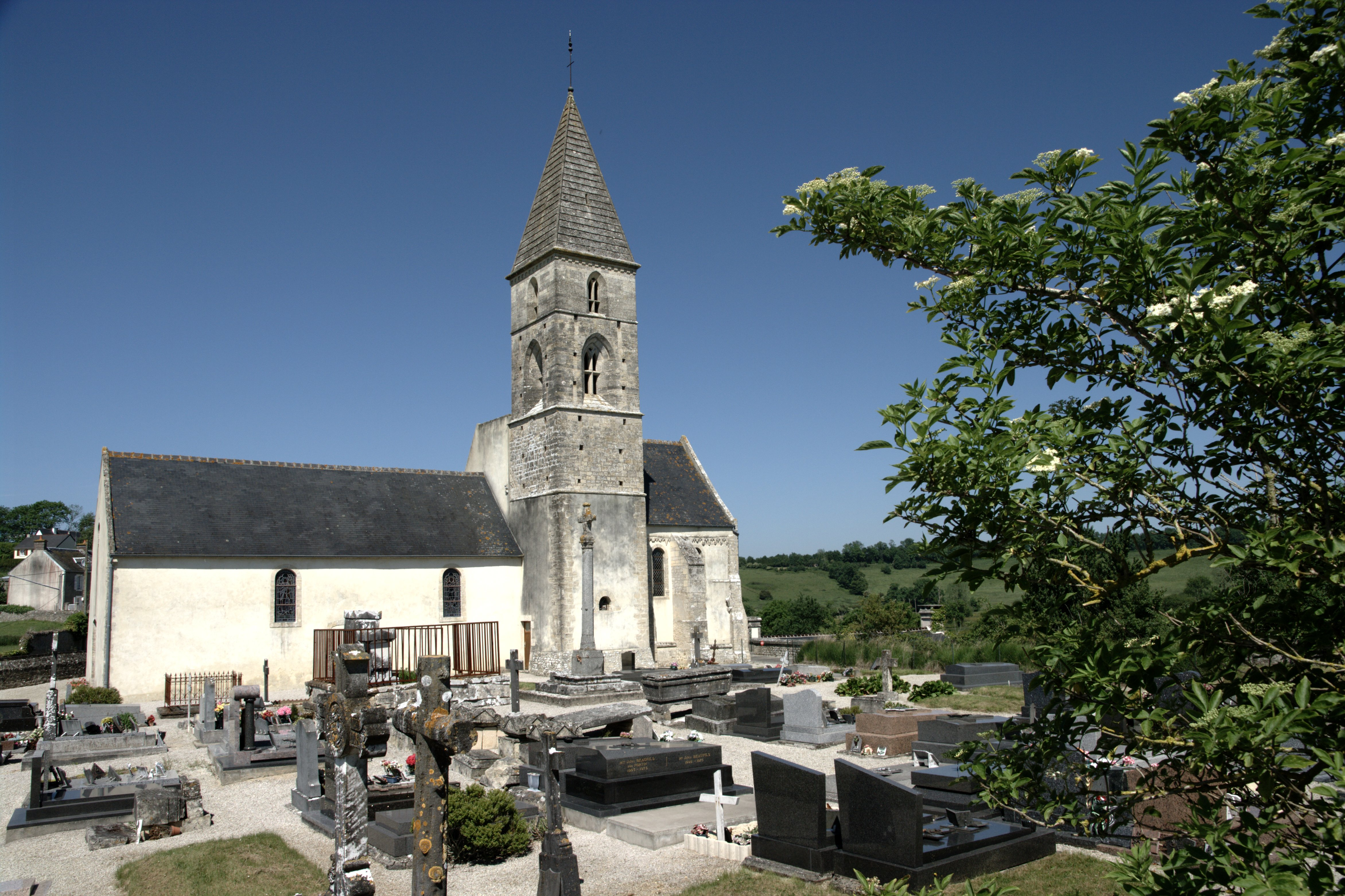
Saint Peter's Church and cemetery

- The Parish Church of Saint Peter dates from the 14th century and contains a Painting: The Judgement of Solomon (16th century) which is registered as an historical object.

== See also ==
- Communes of the Calvados department
