= Écrammeville =

- Part of Formigny La Bataille
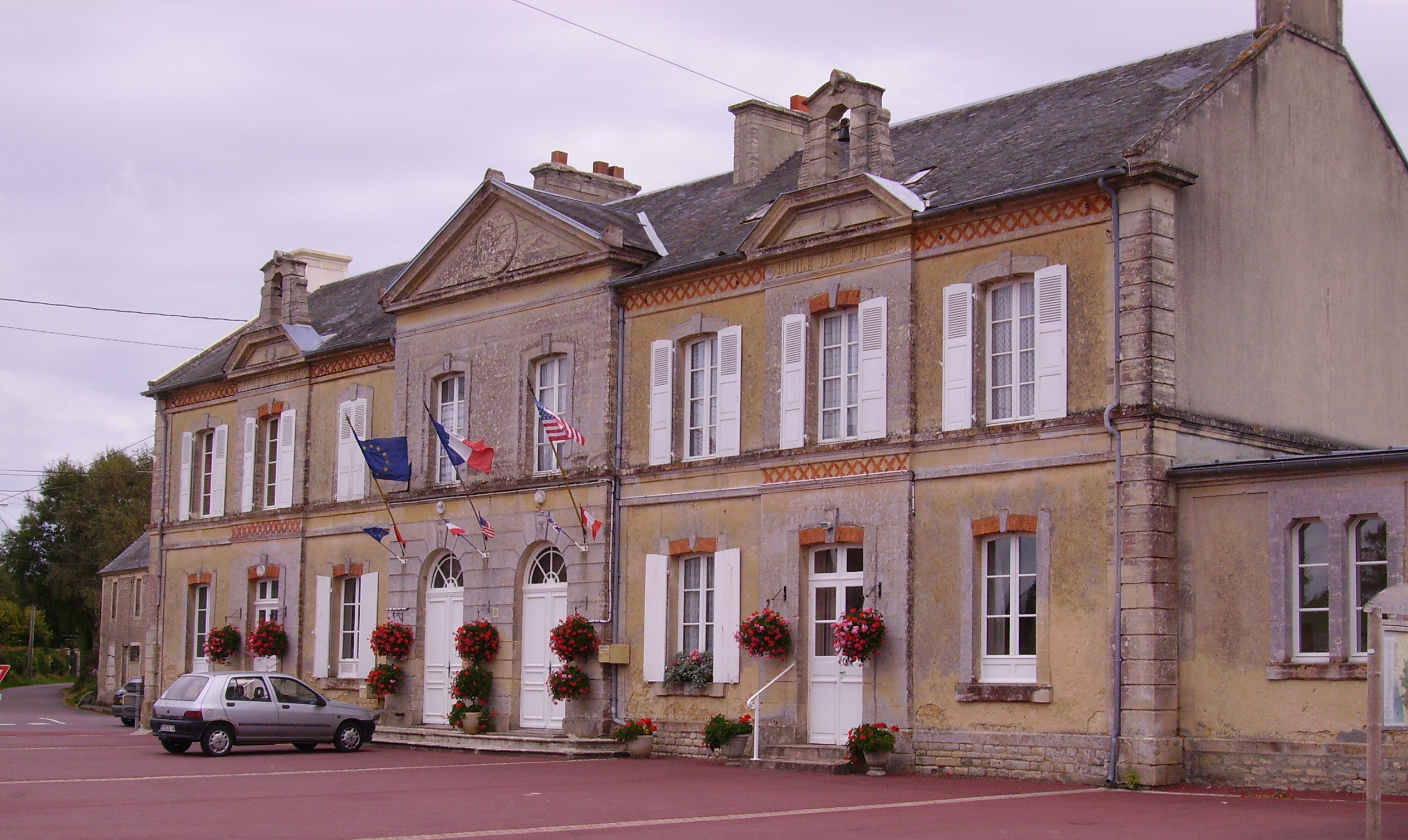
- Town hall
- Location of Écrammeville
- Location within France Location within Normandy
- Coordinates: 49°19′26″N 0°56′35″W
- Country: France
- Region: Normandy
- Department: Calvados
- Arrondissement: Bayeux
- Canton: Trévières
- Commune: Formigny La Bataille
- Area^{1}: 6.84 km^{2} (2.64 sq mi)
- Elevation: 23 m (75 ft)
- Highest elevation: 48 m (157 ft)
- Lowest elevation: 0 m (0 ft)
- Population (2019): 208
  - Density: 30.4/km^{2} (78.8/sq mi)
- Time zone: UTC+01:00 (CET)
  - Summer (DST): UTC+02:00 (CEST)
- Postal code: 14710
- ^{1} French Land Register data, which excludes lakes, ponds, glaciers > 1 km^{2} (0.386 sq mi or 247 acres) and river estuaries.

Écrammeville is a former commune in the Calvados department in the Normandy region in northwestern France. On 1 January 2017, it was merged into the new commune Formigny La Bataille.

== See also ==
- Communes of the Calvados department
