= Louvières, Calvados =

Louvières
- Part of Formigny La Bataille
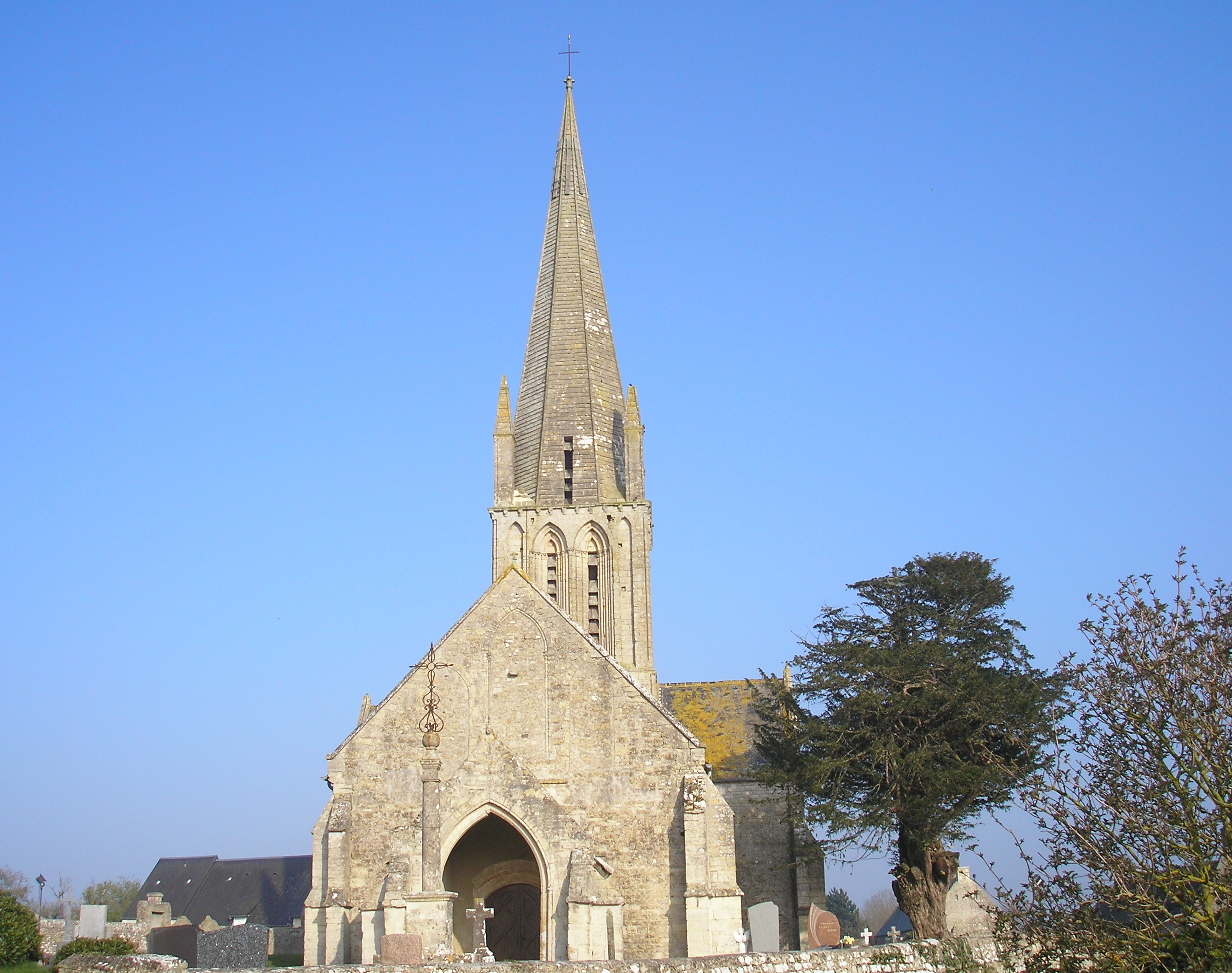
- Location of Louvières
- Location within France Location within Normandy
- Coordinates: 49°21′50″N 0°55′01″W
- Country: France
- Region: Normandy
- Department: Calvados
- Arrondissement: Bayeux
- Canton: Trévières
- Commune: Formigny La Bataille
- Area^{1}: 4.19 km^{2} (1.62 sq mi)
- Elevation: 50 m (160 ft)
- Highest elevation: 49 m (161 ft)
- Lowest elevation: 0 m (0 ft)
- Population (2019): 71
  - Density: 17/km^{2} (44/sq mi)
- Time zone: UTC+01:00 (CET)
  - Summer (DST): UTC+02:00 (CEST)
- Postal code: 14710
- ^{1} French Land Register data, which excludes lakes, ponds, glaciers > 1 km^{2} (0.386 sq mi or 247 acres) and river estuaries.

Louvières (French pronunciation: [luvjɛʁ]) is a former commune in the Calvados department in the Normandy region in northwestern France. On 1 January 2017, it was merged into the new commune Formigny La Bataille.

== See also ==
- Communes of the Calvados department
