= Cirey-lès-Mareilles =

- Commune
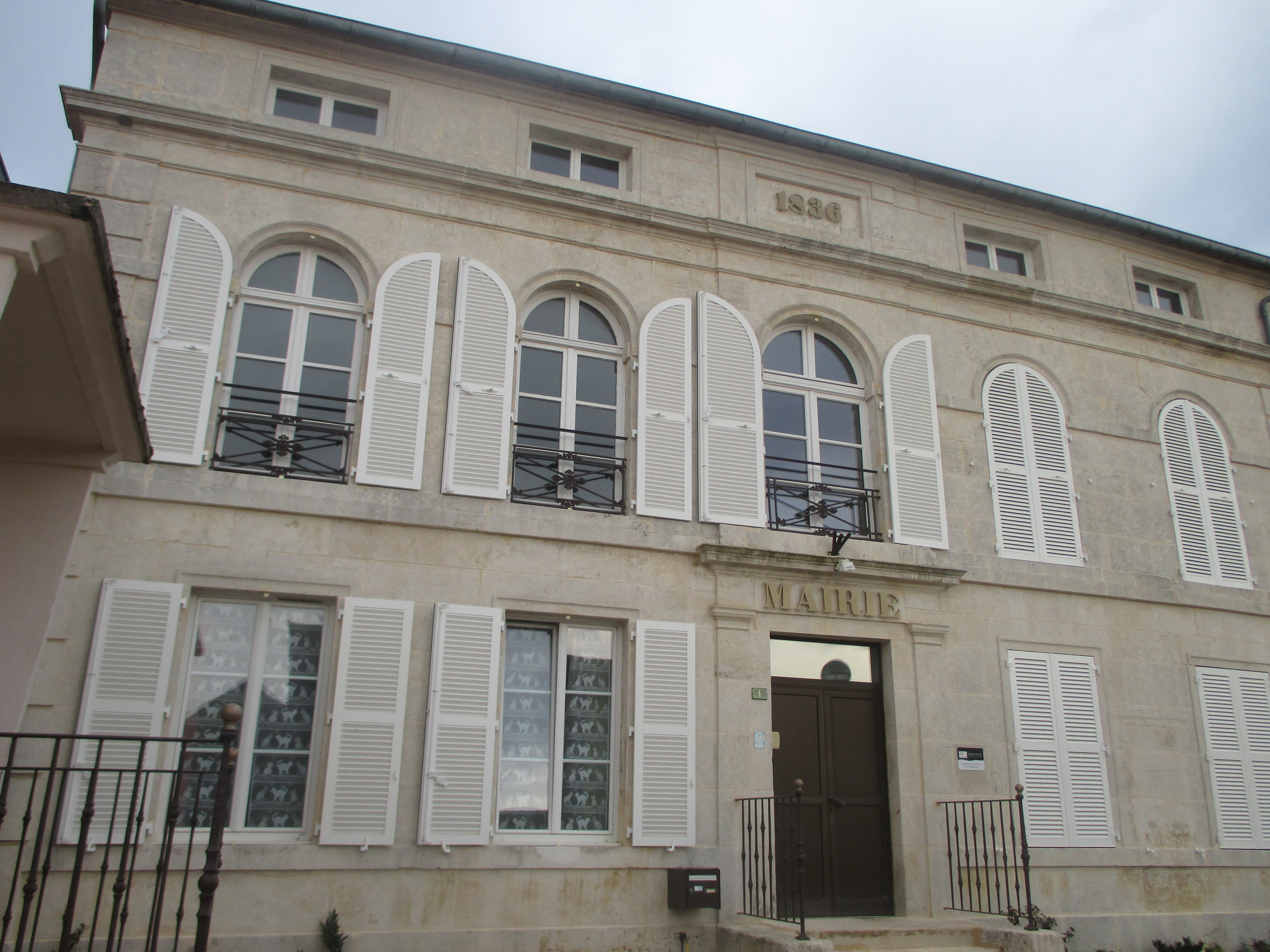
- The town hall in Cirey-lès-Mareilles
- Location of Cirey-lès-Mareilles
- Location within France Location within Grand Est
- Coordinates: 48°11′59″N 5°17′08″E
- Country: France
- Region: Grand Est
- Department: Haute-Marne
- Arrondissement: Chaumont
- Canton: Bologne
- Intercommunality: Meuse Rognon

Government
  - Mayor (2020–2026): Laurent Ecosse
- Area^{1}: 14.59 km^{2} (5.63 sq mi)
- Elevation: 351 m (1,152 ft)
- Population (2023): 155
  - Density: 10.6/km^{2} (27.5/sq mi)
- Time zone: UTC+01:00 (CET)
  - Summer (DST): UTC+02:00 (CEST)
- INSEE/Postal code: 52128 /52700
- ^{1} French Land Register data, which excludes lakes, ponds, glaciers > 1 km^{2} (0.386 sq mi or 247 acres) and river estuaries.

Cirey-lès-Mareilles (French pronunciation: [siʁɛ lɛ maʁɛj], literally Cirey near Mareilles) is a commune in the Haute-Marne department in north-eastern France.

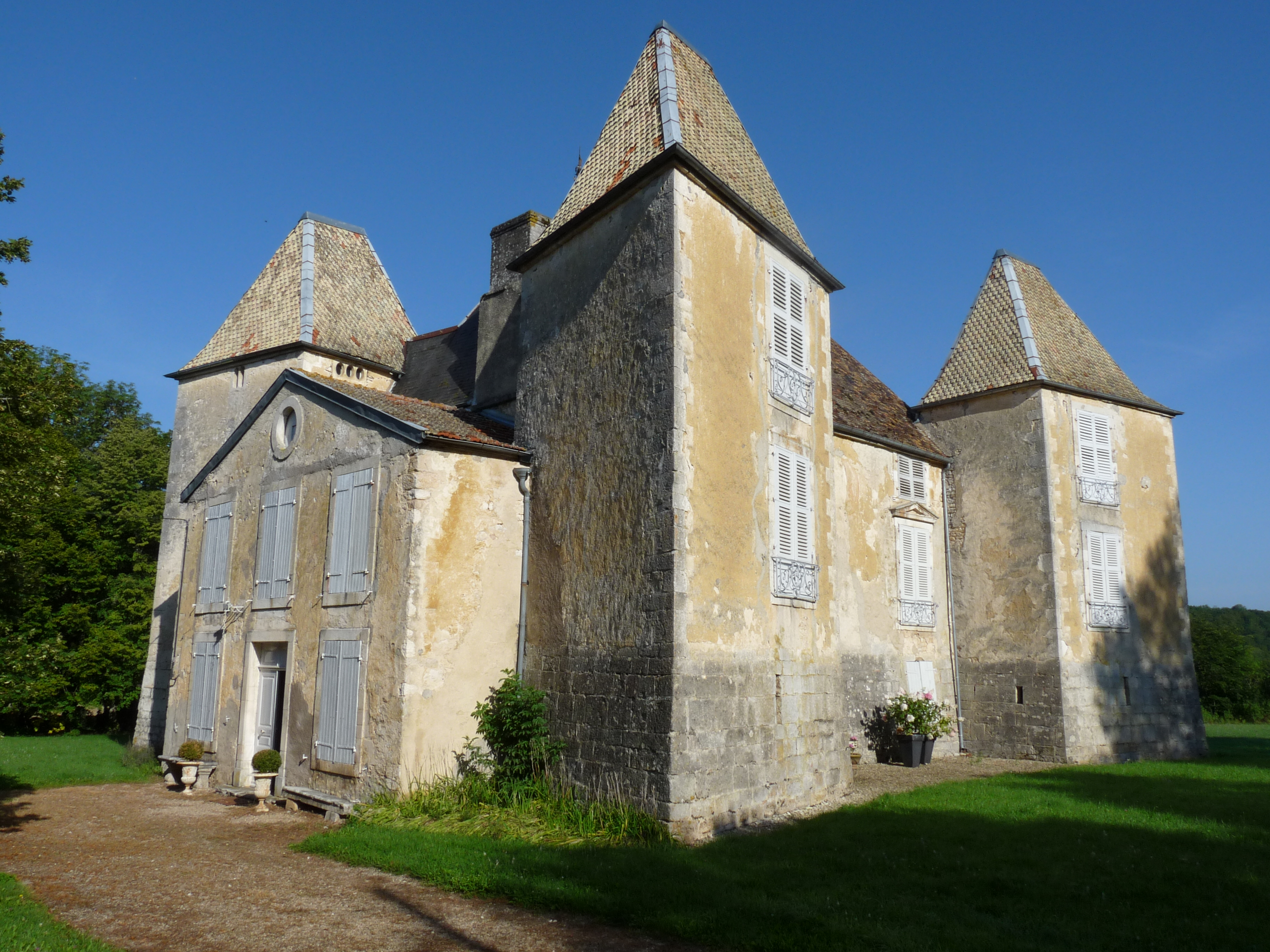
Castle.

== See also ==
- Communes of the Haute-Marne department
