= Briaucourt =

Briaucourt is the name of the following communes in France:

- Briaucourt, Haute-Marne, in the Haute-Marne department
- Briaucourt, Haute-Saône, in the Haute-Saône department
