= Viéville =

- Commune
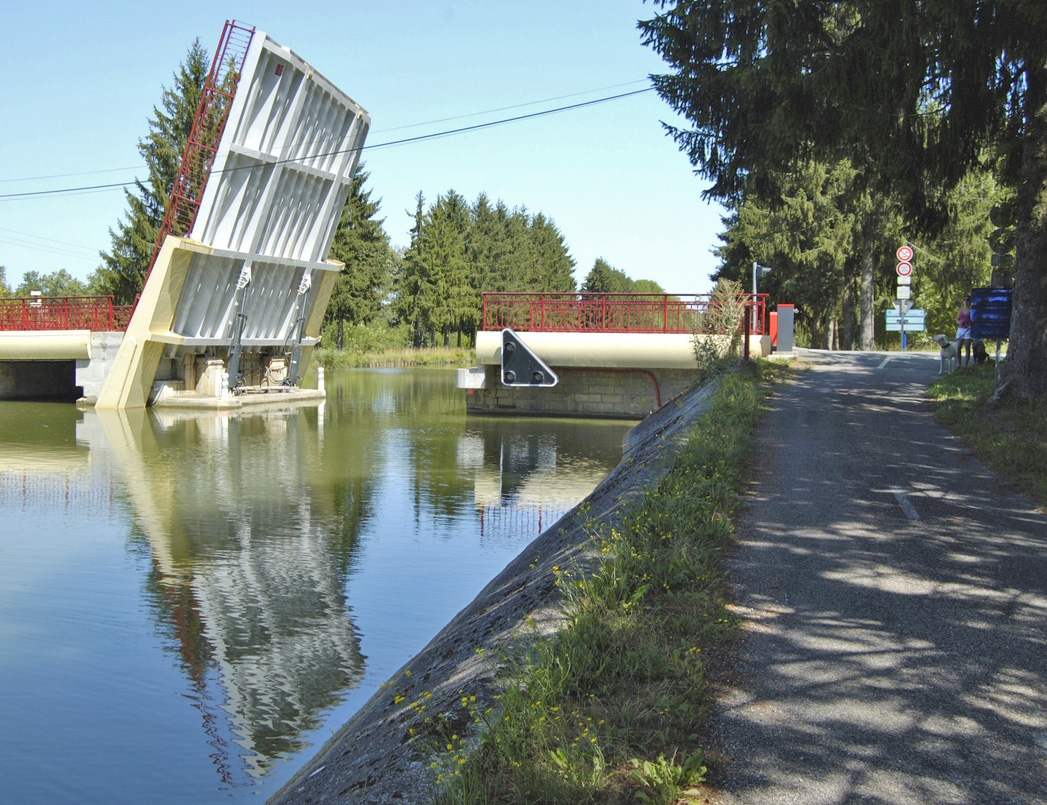
- The lifting bridge in Viéville
- Location of Viéville
- Location within France Location within Grand Est
- Coordinates: 48°14′23″N 5°08′05″E
- Country: France
- Region: Grand Est
- Department: Haute-Marne
- Arrondissement: Chaumont
- Canton: Bologne
- Intercommunality: CA Chaumont

Government
  - Mayor (2020–2026): Audrey Duhoux
- Area^{1}: 11.18 km^{2} (4.32 sq mi)
- Elevation: 235 m (771 ft)
- Population (2023): 324
  - Density: 29.0/km^{2} (75.1/sq mi)
- Time zone: UTC+01:00 (CET)
  - Summer (DST): UTC+02:00 (CEST)
- INSEE/Postal code: 52522 /52310
- ^{1} French Land Register data, which excludes lakes, ponds, glaciers > 1 km^{2} (0.386 sq mi or 247 acres) and river estuaries.

Viéville (French pronunciation: [vjevil]) is a commune in the Haute-Marne department in north-eastern France.

== See also ==
- Communes of the Haute-Marne department
