= Signéville =

- Commune
- Coat of arms
- Location of Signéville
- Location within France Location within Grand Est
- Coordinates: 48°16′01″N 5°16′27″E
- Country: France
- Region: Grand Est
- Department: Haute-Marne
- Arrondissement: Chaumont
- Canton: Bologne
- Intercommunality: Meuse Rognon

Government
  - Mayor (2020–2026): Julien Volot
- Area^{1}: 8.08 km^{2} (3.12 sq mi)
- Elevation: 355 m (1,165 ft)
- Population (2023): 86
  - Density: 11/km^{2} (28/sq mi)
- Time zone: UTC+01:00 (CET)
  - Summer (DST): UTC+02:00 (CEST)
- INSEE/Postal code: 52473 /52700
- ^{1} French Land Register data, which excludes lakes, ponds, glaciers > 1 km^{2} (0.386 sq mi or 247 acres) and river estuaries.

Signéville (French pronunciation: [siɲevil]) is a commune in the Haute-Marne department in north-eastern France. As of 2023, the population of the commune was 86.

== See also ==
- Communes of the Haute-Marne department
