= Rizaucourt-Buchey =

- Commune
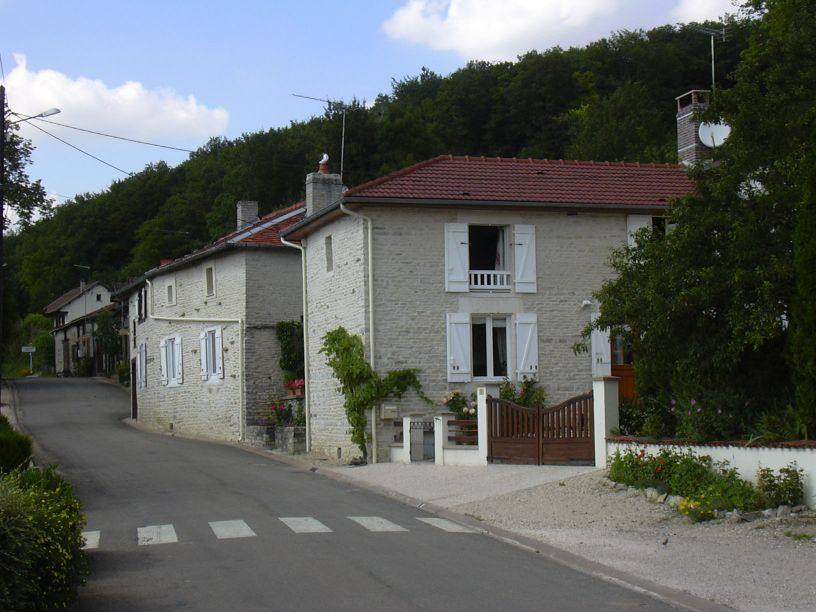
- Houses within Rizaucourt-Buchey

- Coat of arms
- Location of Rizaucourt-Buchey
- Location within France Location within Grand Est
- Coordinates: 48°16′46″N 4°51′59″E
- Country: France
- Region: Grand Est
- Department: Haute-Marne
- Arrondissement: Chaumont
- Canton: Châteauvillain
- Intercommunality: CA Chaumont

Government
  - Mayor (2020–2026): Christine Henry
- Area^{1}: 15.07 km^{2} (5.82 sq mi)
- Elevation: 254 m (833 ft)
- Population (2023): 129
  - Density: 8.56/km^{2} (22.2/sq mi)
- Demonym(s): Rizaucourtois, Rizaucourtoises
- Time zone: UTC+01:00 (CET)
  - Summer (DST): UTC+02:00 (CEST)
- INSEE/Postal code: 52426 /52330
- ^{1} French Land Register data, which excludes lakes, ponds, glaciers > 1 km^{2} (0.386 sq mi or 247 acres) and river estuaries.

Rizaucourt-Buchey (French pronunciation: [ʁizokuʁ byʃɛ]) is a commune in the Haute-Marne department in north-eastern France.

== See also ==
- Communes of the Haute-Marne department
