= Rochefort-sur-la-Côte =

- Commune
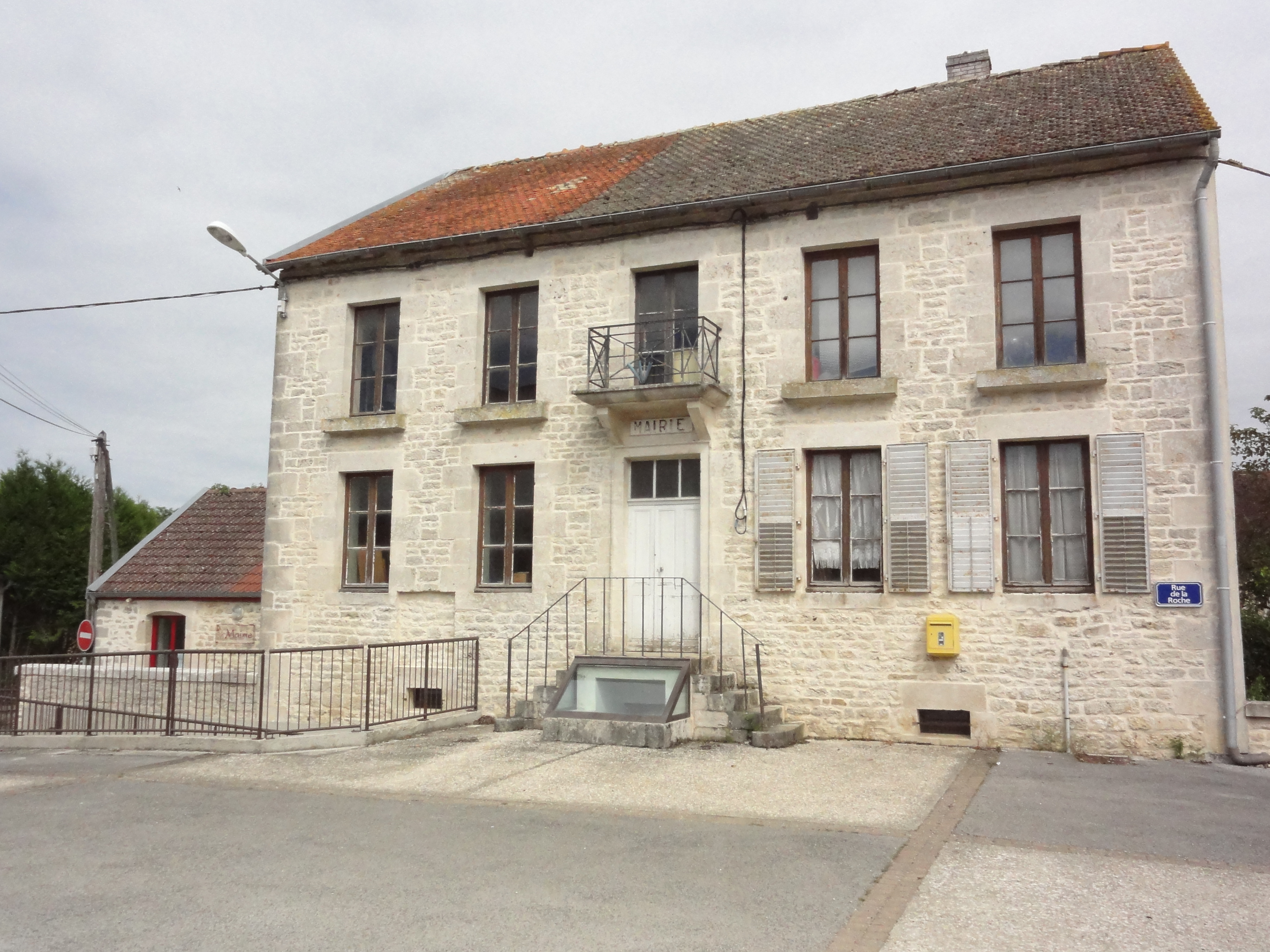
- The town hall in Rochefort-sur-la-Côte
- Location of Rochefort-sur-la-Côte
- Location within France Location within Grand Est
- Coordinates: 48°13′16″N 5°12′16″E
- Country: France
- Region: Grand Est
- Department: Haute-Marne
- Arrondissement: Chaumont
- Canton: Bologne
- Intercommunality: CA Chaumont

Government
  - Mayor (2020–2026): Hélène Haltz
- Area^{1}: 5.18 km^{2} (2.00 sq mi)
- Elevation: 348 m (1,142 ft)
- Population (2023): 66
  - Density: 13/km^{2} (33/sq mi)
- Time zone: UTC+01:00 (CET)
  - Summer (DST): UTC+02:00 (CEST)
- INSEE/Postal code: 52428 /52700
- ^{1} French Land Register data, which excludes lakes, ponds, glaciers > 1 km^{2} (0.386 sq mi or 247 acres) and river estuaries.

Rochefort-sur-la-Côte (French pronunciation: [ʁɔʃfɔʁ syʁ la kot]) is a commune in the Haute-Marne department in north-eastern France.

== See also ==
- Communes of the Haute-Marne department
