= Lamancine =

- Commune
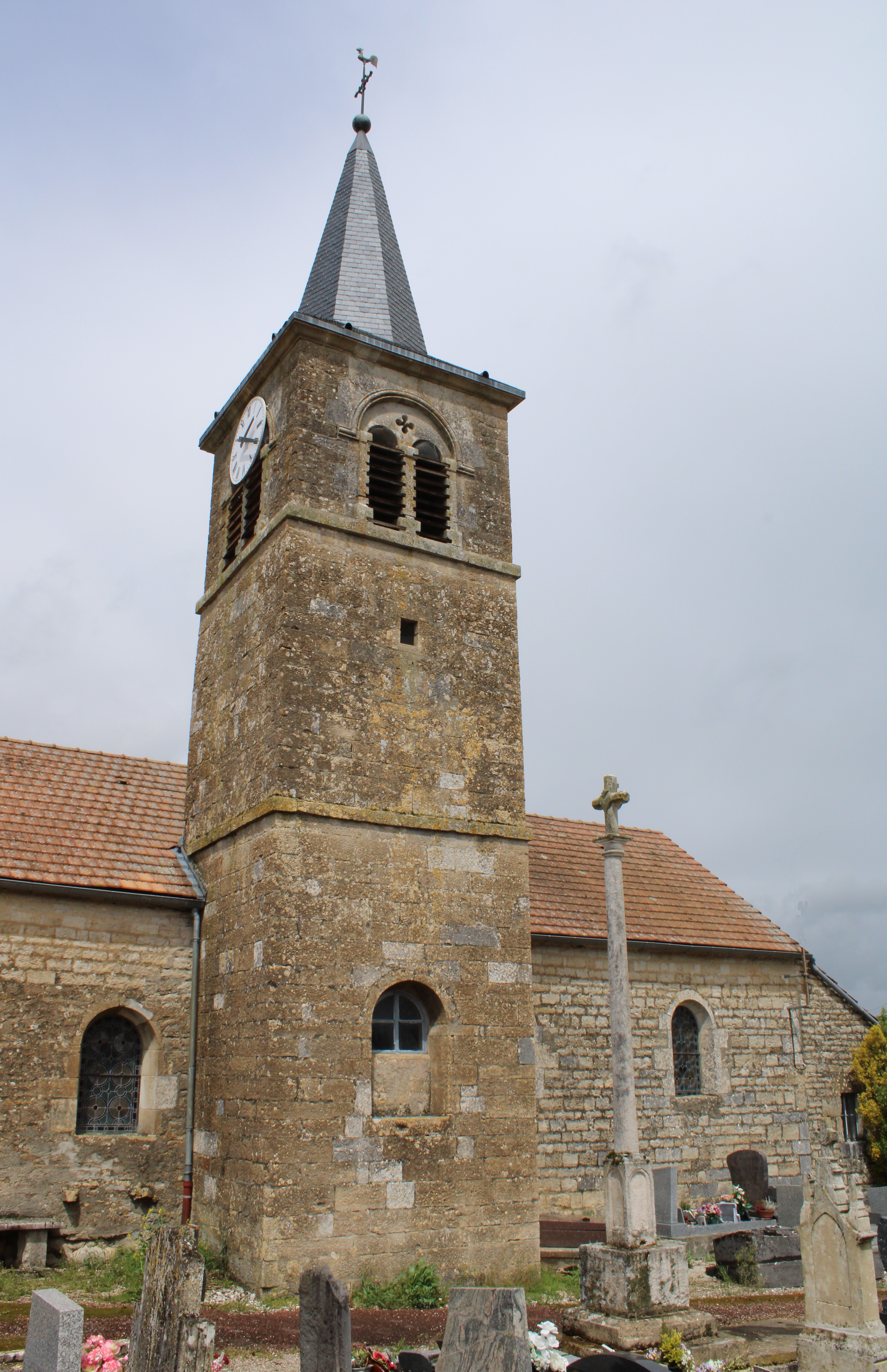
- The church in Lamancine
- Location of Lamancine
- Location within France Location within Grand Est
- Coordinates: 48°12′36″N 5°07′00″E
- Country: France
- Region: Grand Est
- Department: Haute-Marne
- Arrondissement: Chaumont
- Canton: Bologne
- Intercommunality: CA Chaumont

Government
  - Mayor (2020–2026): Michèle Gianino Médard
- Area^{1}: 4.48 km^{2} (1.73 sq mi)
- Elevation: 260 m (850 ft)
- Population (2023): 124
  - Density: 27.7/km^{2} (71.7/sq mi)
- Demonym(s): Lamancinois, Lamancinoises
- Time zone: UTC+01:00 (CET)
  - Summer (DST): UTC+02:00 (CEST)
- INSEE/Postal code: 52260 /52310
- ^{1} French Land Register data, which excludes lakes, ponds, glaciers > 1 km^{2} (0.386 sq mi or 247 acres) and river estuaries.

Lamancine (French pronunciation: [lamɑ̃sin]) is a commune in the Haute-Marne department in north-eastern France.

== See also ==
- Communes of the Haute-Marne department
