= Ecot-la-Combe =

- Commune
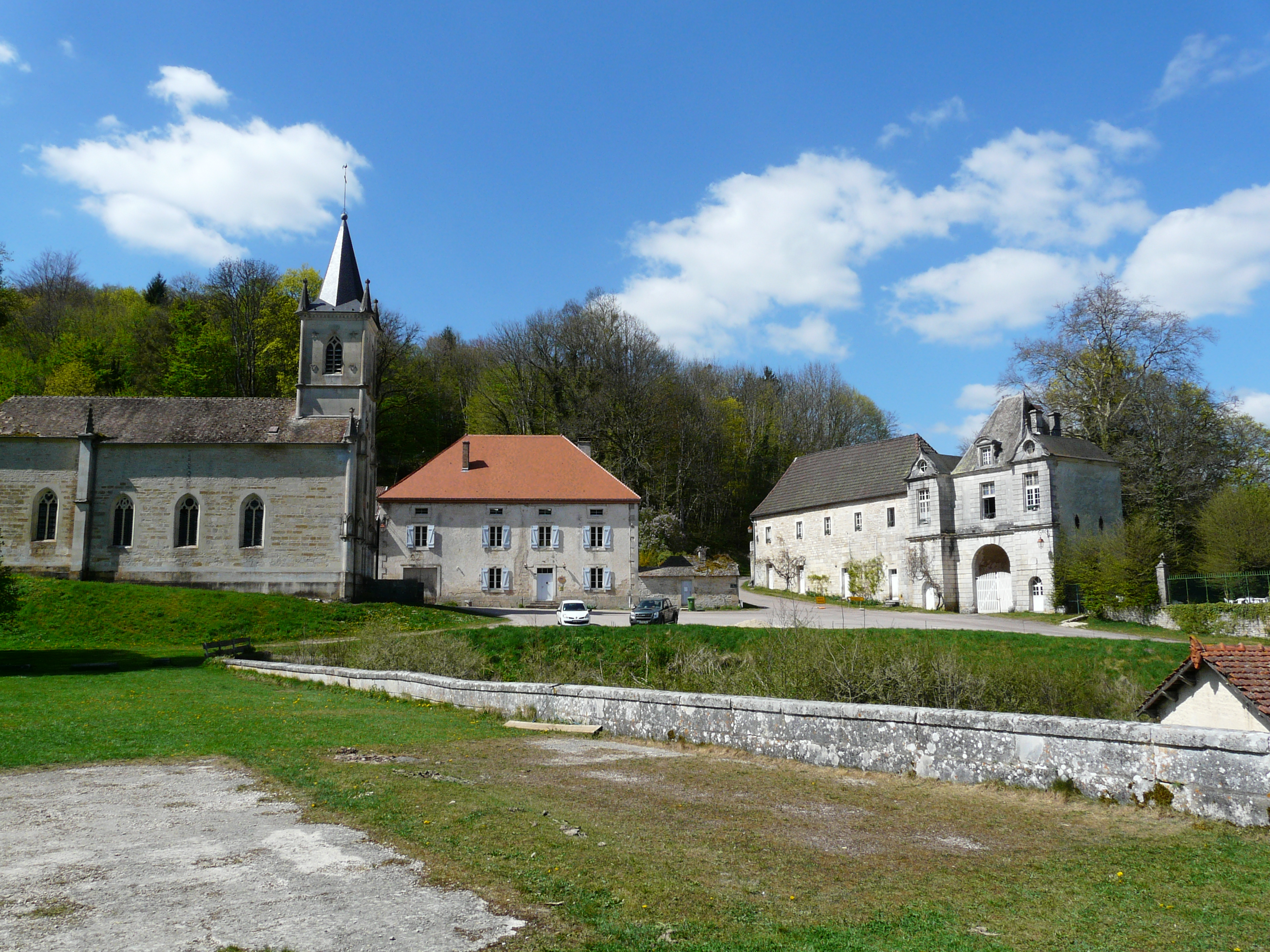
- A general view of Ecot-la-Combe

- Coat of arms
- Location of Ecot-la-Combe
- Location within France Location within Grand Est
- Coordinates: 48°12′33″N 5°22′57″E
- Country: France
- Region: Grand Est
- Department: Haute-Marne
- Arrondissement: Chaumont
- Canton: Bologne

Government
  - Mayor (2020–2026): Edouard Marié
- Area^{1}: 20.93 km^{2} (8.08 sq mi)
- Elevation: 300 m (980 ft)
- Population (2023): 36
  - Density: 1.7/km^{2} (4.5/sq mi)
- Time zone: UTC+01:00 (CET)
  - Summer (DST): UTC+02:00 (CEST)
- INSEE/Postal code: 52183 /52700
- ^{1} French Land Register data, which excludes lakes, ponds, glaciers > 1 km^{2} (0.386 sq mi or 247 acres) and river estuaries.

Ecot-la-Combe (French pronunciation: [eko la kɔ̃b]) is a commune in the Haute-Marne department in north-eastern France.

== See also ==
- Communes of the Haute-Marne department
