= Marbéville =

- Commune
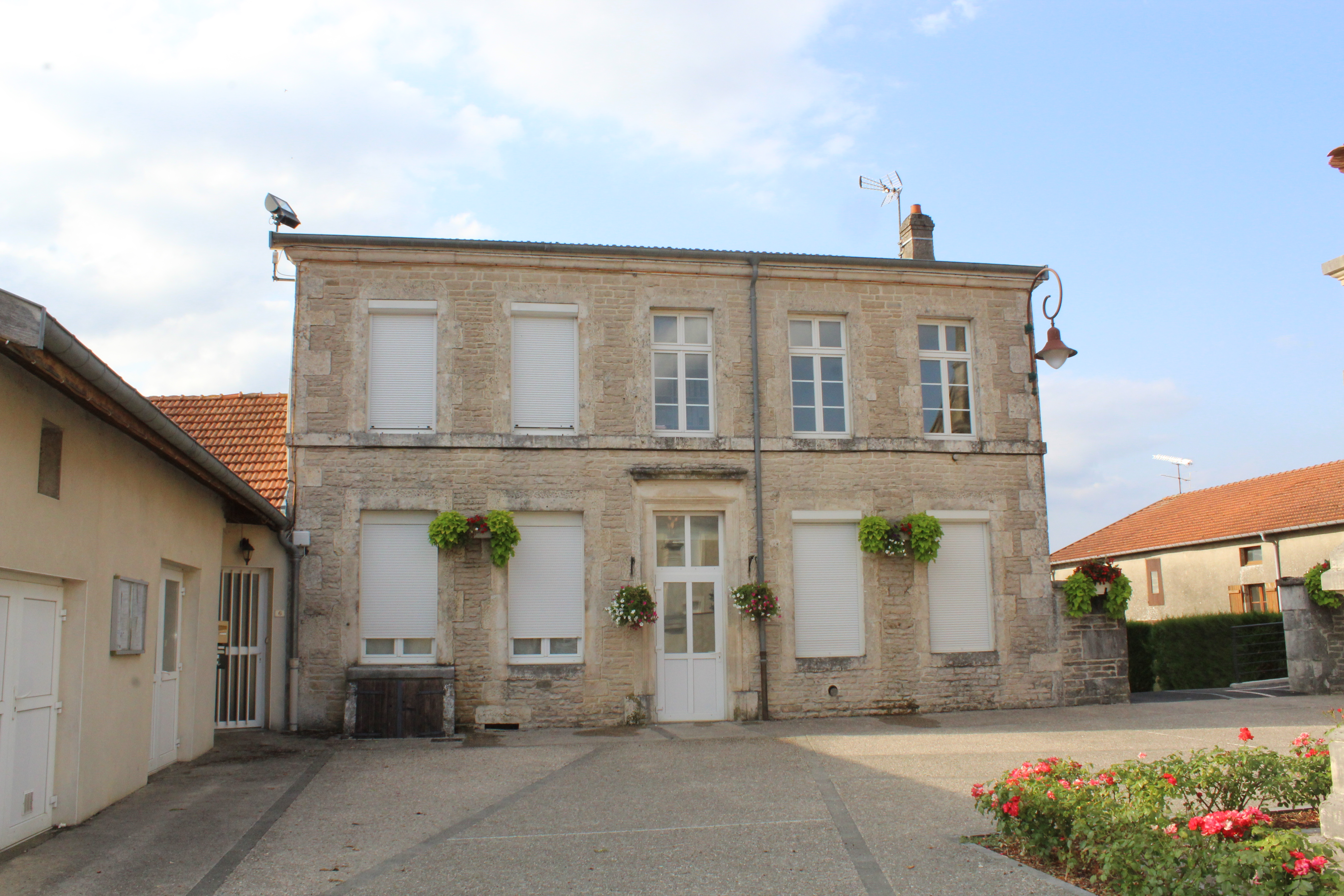
- The town hall in Marbéville
- Location of Marbéville
- Location within France Location within Grand Est
- Coordinates: 48°16′38″N 5°01′25″E
- Country: France
- Region: Grand Est
- Department: Haute-Marne
- Arrondissement: Chaumont
- Canton: Bologne
- Intercommunality: CA Chaumont

Government
  - Mayor (2020–2026): Michel Courageot
- Area^{1}: 17.71 km^{2} (6.84 sq mi)
- Elevation: 315 m (1,033 ft)
- Population (2023): 100
  - Density: 5.6/km^{2} (15/sq mi)
- Time zone: UTC+01:00 (CET)
  - Summer (DST): UTC+02:00 (CEST)
- INSEE/Postal code: 52310 /52320
- ^{1} French Land Register data, which excludes lakes, ponds, glaciers > 1 km^{2} (0.386 sq mi or 247 acres) and river estuaries.

Marbéville (French pronunciation: [maʁbevil]) is a commune in the Haute-Marne department in north-eastern France.

== See also ==
- Communes of the Haute-Marne department
