= Montot-sur-Rognon =

- Commune
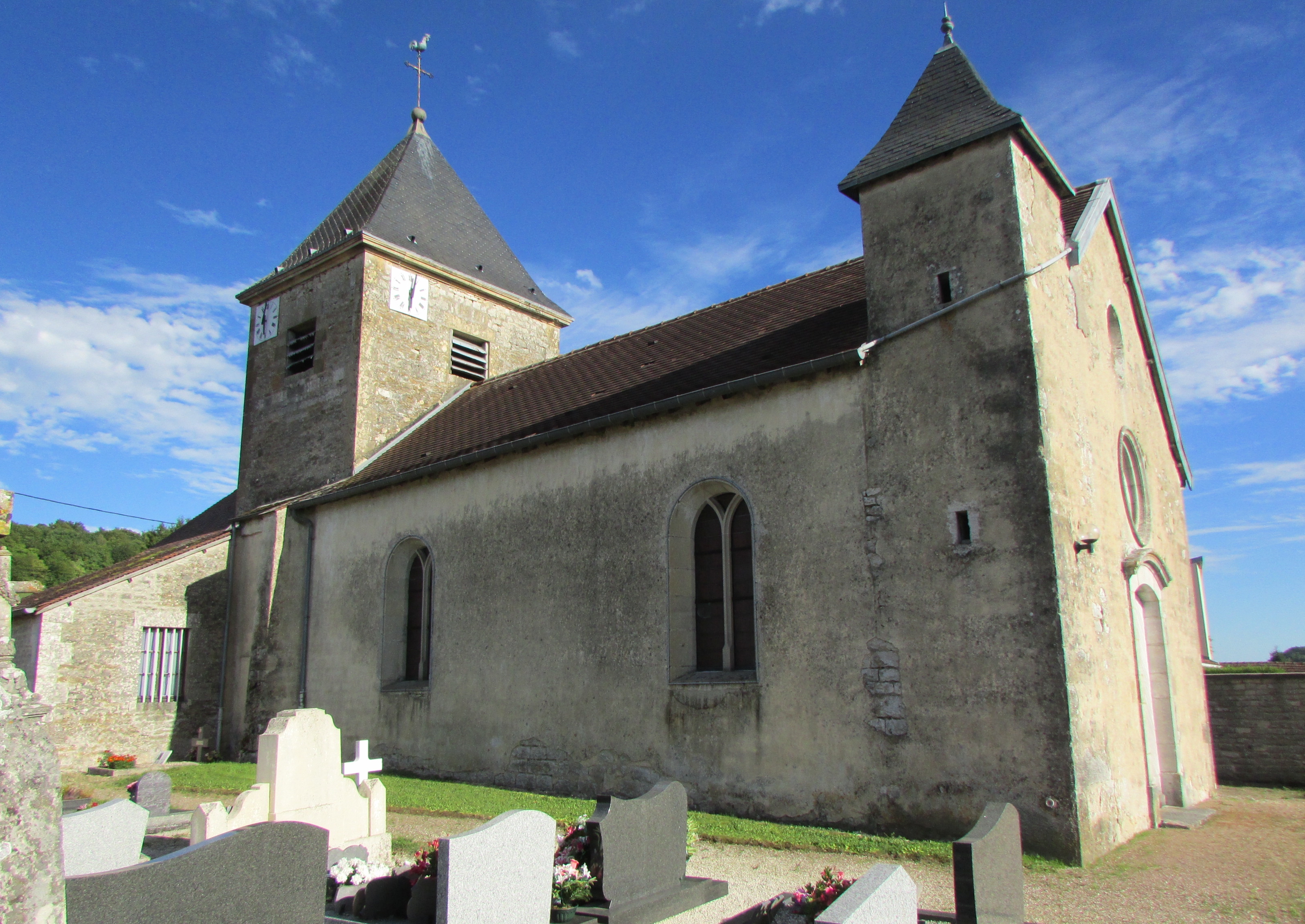
- The church in Montot-sur-Rognon

- Coat of arms
- Location of Montot-sur-Rognon
- Location within France Location within Grand Est
- Coordinates: 48°16′37″N 5°17′23″E
- Country: France
- Region: Grand Est
- Department: Haute-Marne
- Arrondissement: Chaumont
- Canton: Bologne
- Intercommunality: Meuse Rognon

Government
  - Mayor (2020–2026): Michel Boulart
- Area^{1}: 7.84 km^{2} (3.03 sq mi)
- Elevation: 355 m (1,165 ft)
- Population (2023): 109
  - Density: 13.9/km^{2} (36.0/sq mi)
- Time zone: UTC+01:00 (CET)
  - Summer (DST): UTC+02:00 (CEST)
- INSEE/Postal code: 52335 /52700
- ^{1} French Land Register data, which excludes lakes, ponds, glaciers > 1 km^{2} (0.386 sq mi or 247 acres) and river estuaries.

Montot-sur-Rognon (French pronunciation: [mɔ̃to syʁ ʁɔɲɔ̃]) is a commune in the Haute-Marne department in north-eastern France.

== See also ==
- Communes of the Haute-Marne department
