= Soncourt-sur-Marne =

- Commune
- Location of Soncourt-sur-Marne
- Location within France Location within Grand Est
- Coordinates: 48°15′12″N 5°06′54″E
- Country: France
- Region: Grand Est
- Department: Haute-Marne
- Arrondissement: Chaumont
- Canton: Bologne
- Intercommunality: CA Chaumont

Government
  - Mayor (2020–2026): Didier Jolly
- Area^{1}: 13.63 km^{2} (5.26 sq mi)
- Elevation: 225 m (738 ft)
- Population (2023): 326
  - Density: 23.9/km^{2} (61.9/sq mi)
- Time zone: UTC+01:00 (CET)
  - Summer (DST): UTC+02:00 (CEST)
- INSEE/Postal code: 52480 /52320
- ^{1} French Land Register data, which excludes lakes, ponds, glaciers > 1 km^{2} (0.386 sq mi or 247 acres) and river estuaries.

Soncourt-sur-Marne (French pronunciation: [sɔ̃kuʁ syʁ maʁn], literally Soncourt on Marne) is a commune in the Haute-Marne department in north-eastern France.

== See also ==
- Communes of the Haute-Marne department
