= Ormoy-lès-Sexfontaines =

- Commune
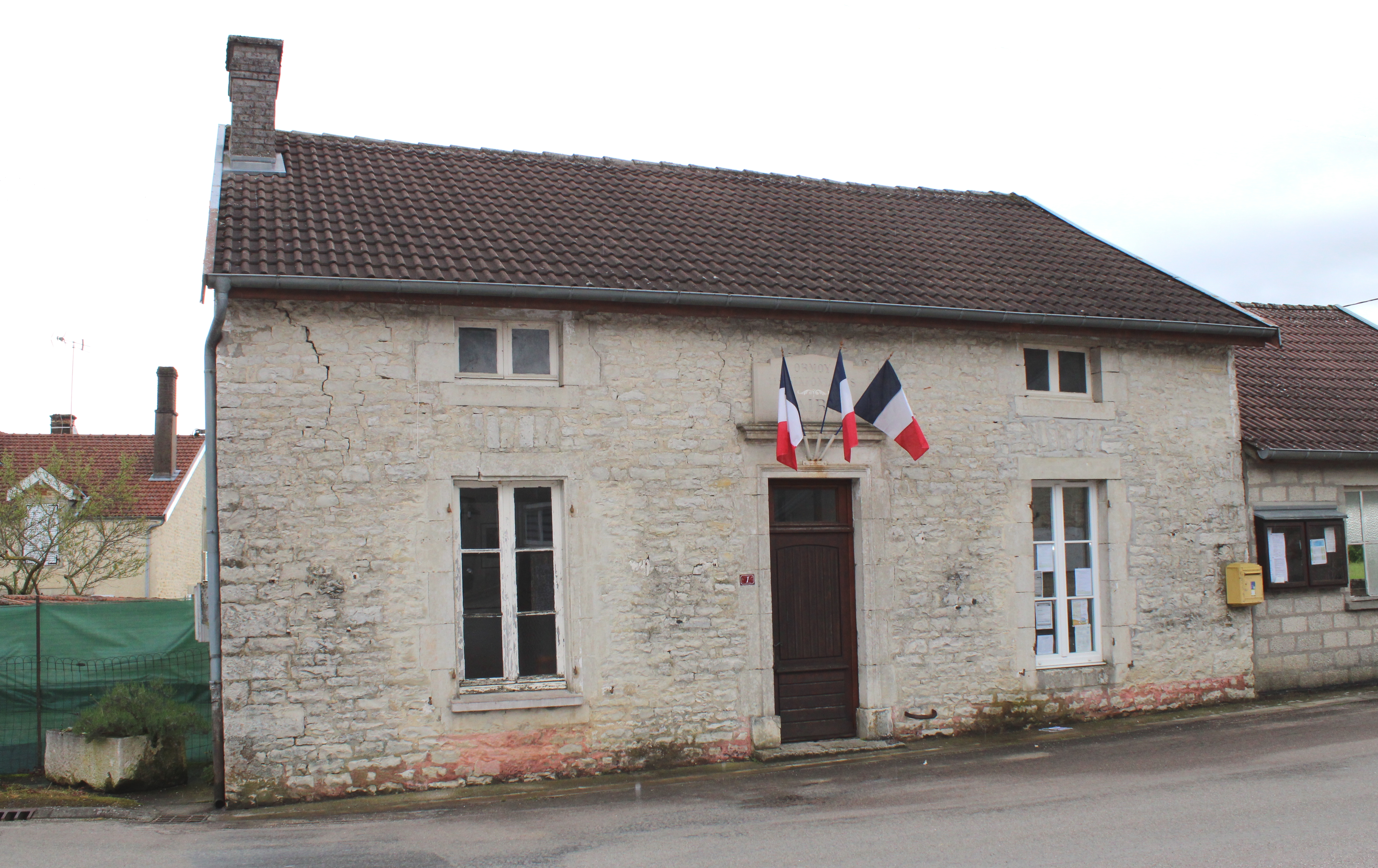
- The town hall in Ormoy-lès-Sexfontaines
- Location of Ormoy-lès-Sexfontaines
- Location within France Location within Grand Est
- Coordinates: 48°13′15″N 5°04′05″E
- Country: France
- Region: Grand Est
- Department: Haute-Marne
- Arrondissement: Chaumont
- Canton: Bologne
- Intercommunality: CA Chaumont

Government
  - Mayor (2020–2026): Céline Oger
- Area^{1}: 5.53 km^{2} (2.14 sq mi)
- Elevation: 294 m (965 ft)
- Population (2023): 40
  - Density: 7.2/km^{2} (19/sq mi)
- Time zone: UTC+01:00 (CET)
  - Summer (DST): UTC+02:00 (CEST)
- INSEE/Postal code: 52367 /52310
- ^{1} French Land Register data, which excludes lakes, ponds, glaciers > 1 km^{2} (0.386 sq mi or 247 acres) and river estuaries.

Ormoy-lès-Sexfontaines is a commune in the Haute-Marne department in north-eastern France. It is home to a selection of attractions and experiences.

== See also ==
- Communes of the Haute-Marne department
