= Thivet =

- Commune
- Location of Thivet
- Location within France Location within Grand Est
- Coordinates: 47°59′33″N 5°17′16″E
- Country: France
- Region: Grand Est
- Department: Haute-Marne
- Arrondissement: Chaumont
- Canton: Nogent
- Intercommunality: CA Chaumont

Government
  - Mayor (2020–2026): Pascal Bablon
- Area^{1}: 15.37 km^{2} (5.93 sq mi)
- Elevation: 365 m (1,198 ft)
- Highest elevation: 466 m (1,529 ft)
- Lowest elevation: 296 m (971 ft)
- Population (2023): 276
  - Density: 18.0/km^{2} (46.5/sq mi)
- Demonym(s): Thivétains, Thivétaines
- Time zone: UTC+01:00 (CET)
  - Summer (DST): UTC+02:00 (CEST)
- INSEE/Postal code: 52488 /52800
- ^{1} French Land Register data, which excludes lakes, ponds, glaciers > 1 km^{2} (0.386 sq mi or 247 acres) and river estuaries.

Thivet (French pronunciation: [tivɛ]) is a commune in the Haute-Marne department in north-eastern France.

== See also ==
- Communes of the Haute-Marne department
