= Ninville =

- Commune
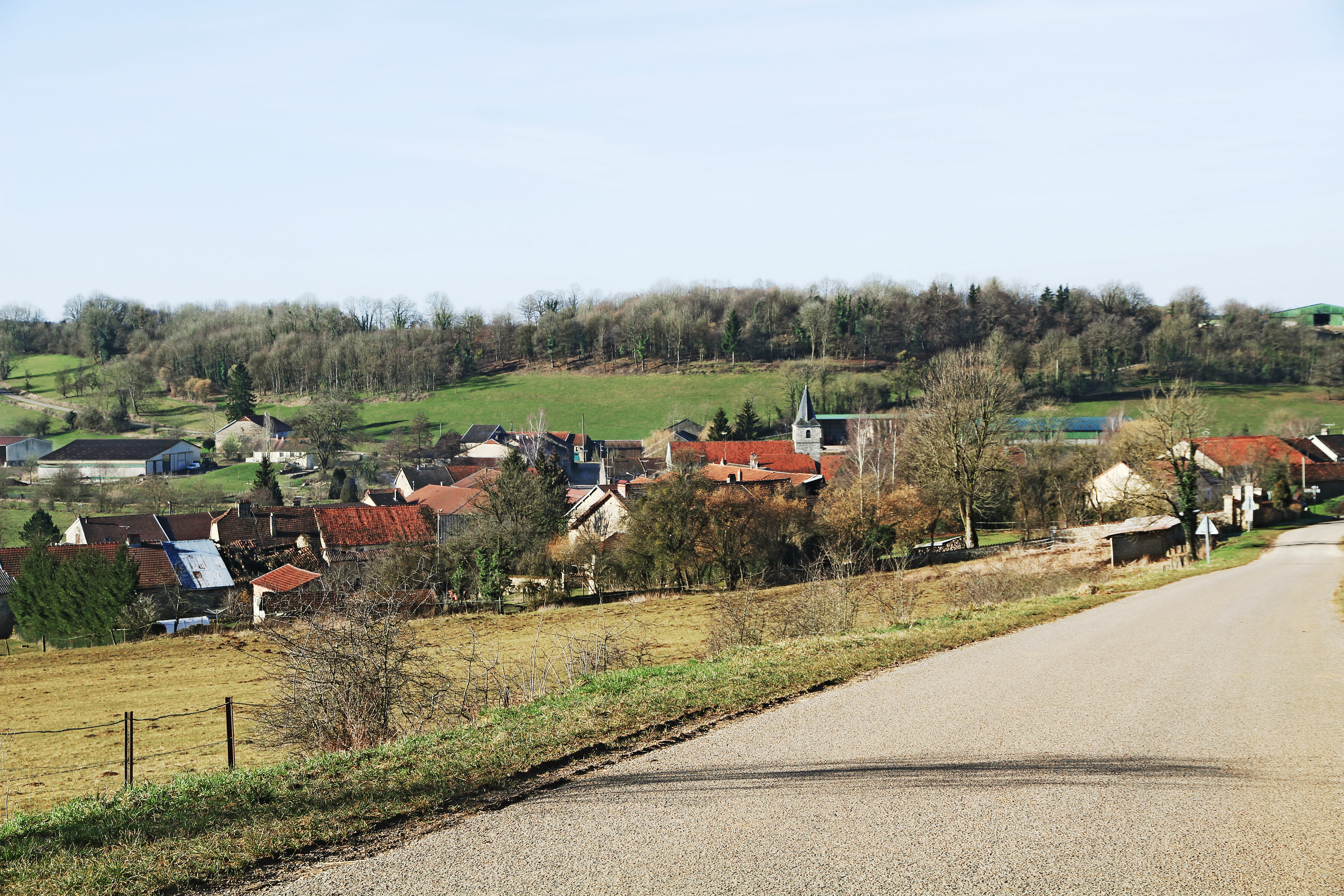
- A general view of Ninville
- Location of Ninville
- Location within France Location within Grand Est
- Coordinates: 48°04′31″N 5°26′15″E
- Country: France
- Region: Grand Est
- Department: Haute-Marne
- Arrondissement: Chaumont
- Canton: Nogent
- Intercommunality: CA Chaumont

Government
  - Mayor (2020–2026): Cyril Moussu
- Area^{1}: 9.03 km^{2} (3.49 sq mi)
- Elevation: 385 m (1,263 ft)
- Population (2023): 62
  - Density: 6.9/km^{2} (18/sq mi)
- Demonym(s): Ninvillois, Ninvilloises
- Time zone: UTC+01:00 (CET)
  - Summer (DST): UTC+02:00 (CEST)
- INSEE/Postal code: 52352 /52800
- ^{1} French Land Register data, which excludes lakes, ponds, glaciers > 1 km^{2} (0.386 sq mi or 247 acres) and river estuaries.

Ninville (French pronunciation: [nɛ̃vil]) is a commune in the Haute-Marne department in north-eastern France.

== See also ==
- Communes of the Haute-Marne department
