= Canton of Bologne =

Coordinates: 48.20°N 5.14°E

The canton of Bologne is an administrative division of the Haute-Marne department, northeastern France. It was created at the French canton reorganisation which came into effect in March 2015. Its seat is in Bologne.

It consists of the following communes:

1. Andelot-Blancheville
2. Annéville-la-Prairie
3. Bologne
4. Bourdons-sur-Rognon
5. Briaucourt
6. Cerisières
7. Chantraines
8. Cirey-lès-Mareilles
9. Consigny
10. Daillancourt
11. Darmannes
12. Domremy-Landéville
13. Doulaincourt-Saucourt
14. Ecot-la-Combe
15. Froncles
16. La Genevroye
17. Guindrecourt-sur-Blaise
18. Lamancine
19. Marbéville
20. Mareilles
21. Meures
22. Mirbel
23. Montot-sur-Rognon
24. Ormoy-lès-Sexfontaines
25. Oudincourt
26. Reynel
27. Rimaucourt
28. Rochefort-sur-la-Côte
29. Roches-Bettaincourt
30. Rouécourt
31. Sexfontaines
32. Signéville
33. Soncourt-sur-Marne
34. Viéville
35. Vignes-la-Côte
36. Vignory
37. Vouécourt
38. Vraincourt
