= Bologne, Haute-Marne =

Bologne
- Commune
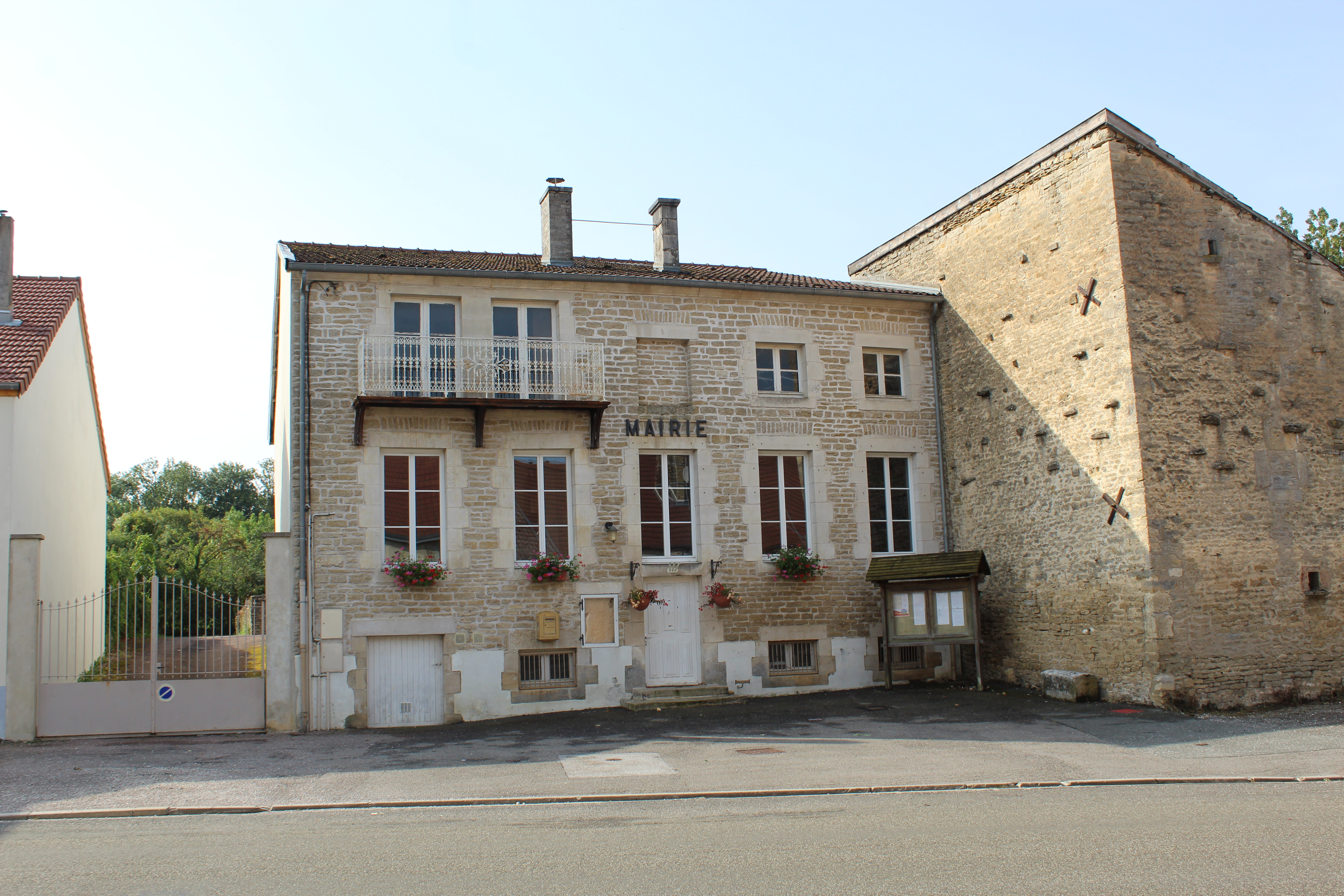
- The town hall in Bologne
- Location of Bologne
- Location within France Location within Grand Est
- Coordinates: 48°12′09″N 5°08′29″E
- Country: France
- Region: Grand Est
- Department: Haute-Marne
- Arrondissement: Chaumont
- Canton: Bologne
- Intercommunality: CA Chaumont

Government
  - Mayor (2022–2026): Maxence Lemoine
- Area^{1}: 31.26 km^{2} (12.07 sq mi)
- Elevation: 241 m (791 ft)
- Highest elevation: 376 m (1,234 ft)
- Lowest elevation: 227 m (745 ft)
- Population (2023): 1,833
  - Density: 58.64/km^{2} (151.9/sq mi)
- Time zone: UTC+01:00 (CET)
  - Summer (DST): UTC+02:00 (CEST)
- INSEE/Postal code: 52058 /52310
- ^{1} French Land Register data, which excludes lakes, ponds, glaciers > 1 km^{2} (0.386 sq mi or 247 acres) and river estuaries.

Bologne (French pronunciation: [bɔlɔɲ]) is a commune in the Haute-Marne department in northeastern France.

== Population ==
Historical population
Year	Pop.	±% p.a.
1968	2,151	—
1975	2,231	+0.52%
1982	2,131	−0.65%
1990	2,041	−0.54%
1999	1,943	−0.55%
2007	1,860	−0.54%
2012	1,870	+0.11%
2017	1,899	+0.31%
2023	1,833	−0.59%
Source: INSEE

== See also ==
- Communes of the Haute-Marne department
