= Daillancourt =

- Commune
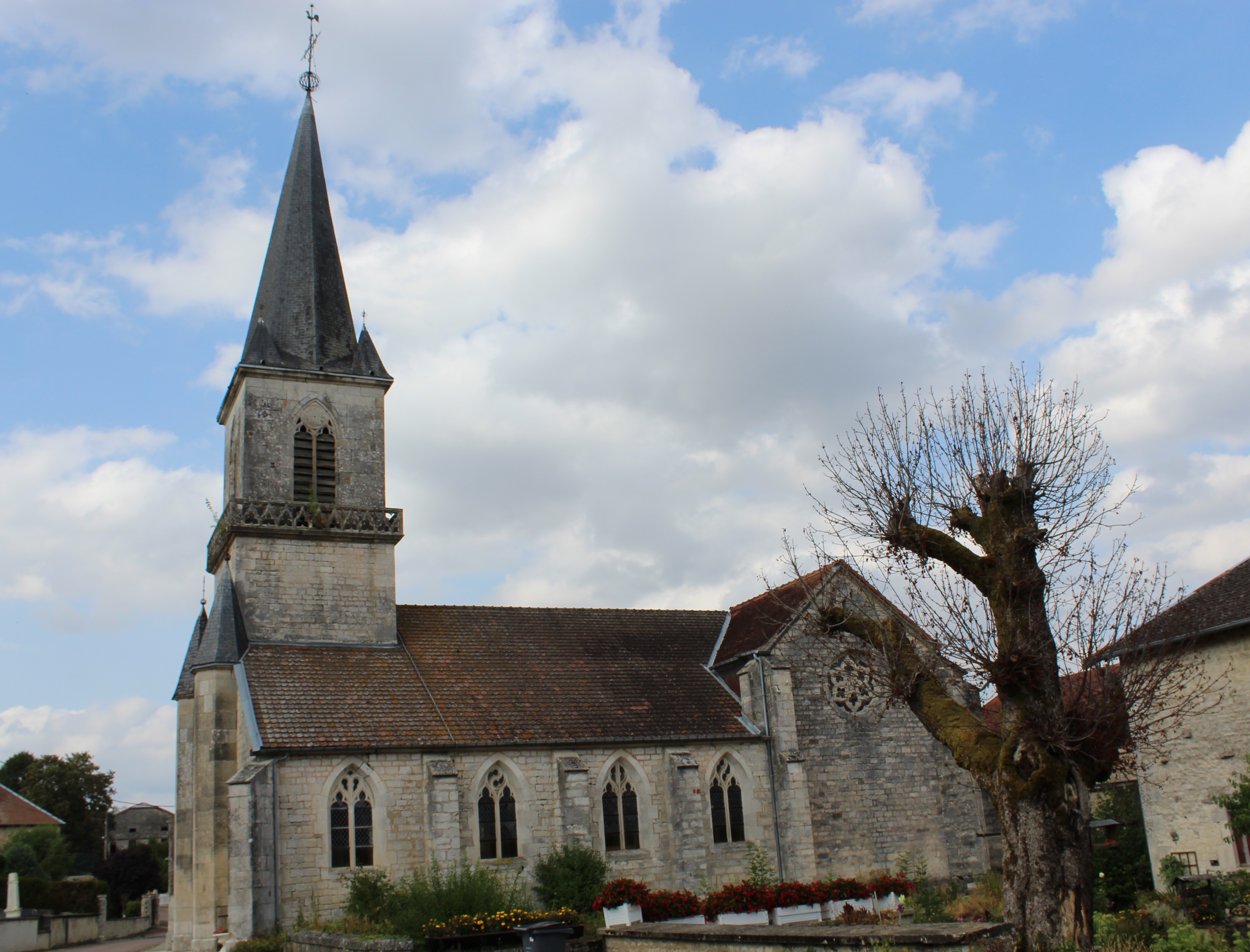
- The church in Daillancourt

- Coat of arms
- Location of Daillancourt
- Location within France Location within Grand Est
- Coordinates: 48°18′11″N 4°57′14″E
- Country: France
- Region: Grand Est
- Department: Haute-Marne
- Arrondissement: Chaumont
- Canton: Bologne
- Intercommunality: CA Chaumont

Government
  - Mayor (2020–2026): Michel Paulin
- Area^{1}: 7.91 km^{2} (3.05 sq mi)
- Elevation: 233 m (764 ft)
- Population (2023): 60
  - Density: 7.6/km^{2} (20/sq mi)
- Demonym(s): Daillancourtois, Daillancourtoises
- Time zone: UTC+01:00 (CET)
  - Summer (DST): UTC+02:00 (CEST)
- INSEE/Postal code: 52160 /52110
- ^{1} French Land Register data, which excludes lakes, ponds, glaciers > 1 km^{2} (0.386 sq mi or 247 acres) and river estuaries.

Daillancourt (French pronunciation: [dajɑ̃kuʁ]) is a commune in the Haute-Marne department in north-eastern France.

== Population ==
Historical population
Year	Pop.	±% p.a.
1968	61	—
1975	62	+0.23%
1982	59	−0.71%
1990	67	+1.60%
1999	85	+2.68%
2007	74	−1.72%
2012	88	+3.53%
2017	67	−5.31%
2023	60	−1.82%
Source: INSEE

== Geography ==
The river Blaise flows through the commune.

== See also ==
- Communes of the Haute-Marne department
