= Annéville-la-Prairie =

- Commune
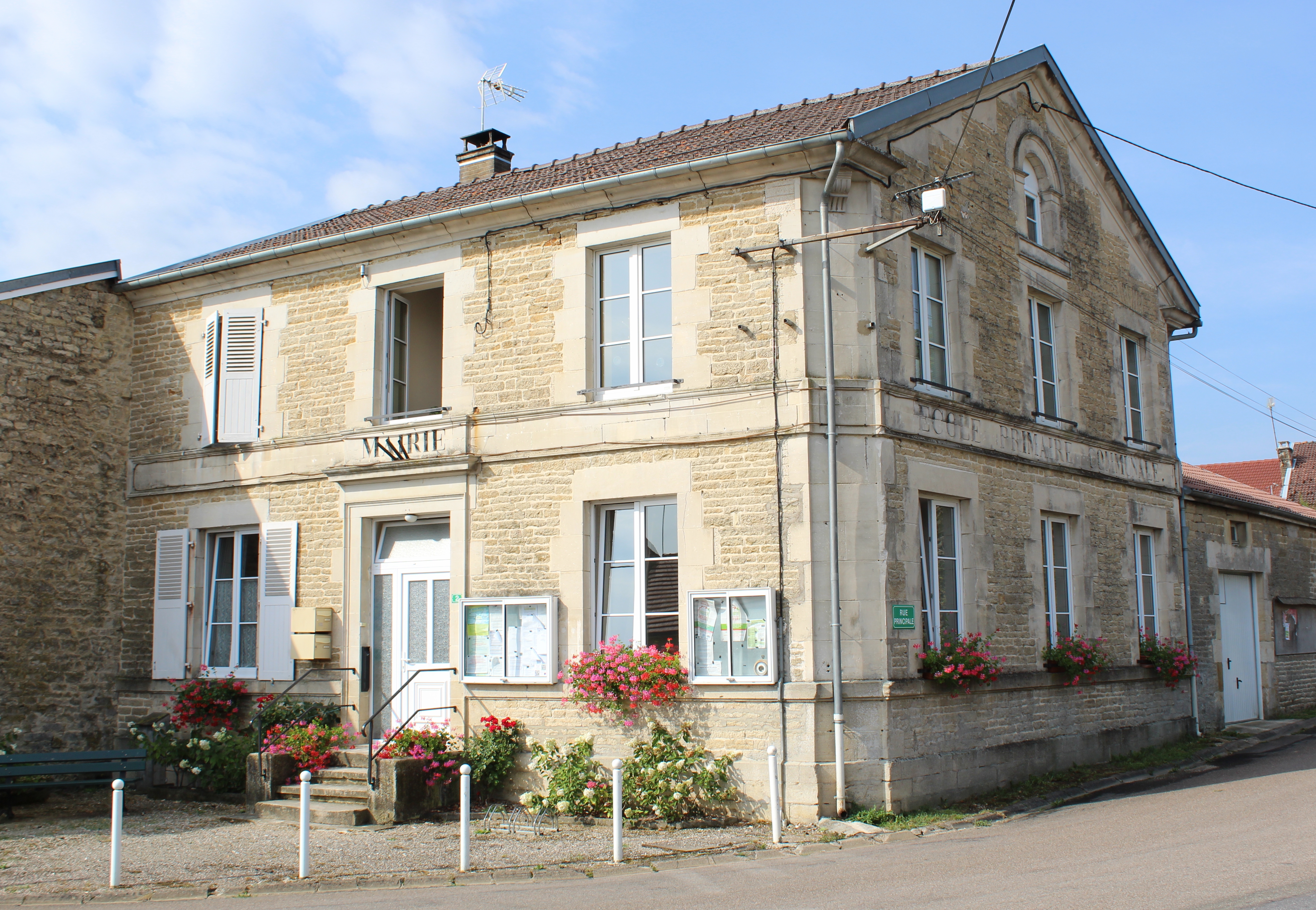
- The town hall in Annéville-la-Prairie

- Coat of arms
- Location of Annéville-la-Prairie
- Location within France Location within Grand Est
- Coordinates: 48°11′52″N 5°05′05″E
- Country: France
- Region: Grand Est
- Department: Haute-Marne
- Arrondissement: Chaumont
- Canton: Bologne
- Intercommunality: CA Chaumont

Government
  - Mayor (2020–2026): Thierry Collot
- Area^{1}: 5.22 km^{2} (2.02 sq mi)
- Elevation: 260 m (850 ft)
- Population (2023): 95
  - Density: 18/km^{2} (47/sq mi)
- Time zone: UTC+01:00 (CET)
  - Summer (DST): UTC+02:00 (CEST)
- INSEE/Postal code: 52011 /52310
- ^{1} French Land Register data, which excludes lakes, ponds, glaciers > 1 km^{2} (0.386 sq mi or 247 acres) and river estuaries.

Annéville-la-Prairie (French pronunciation: [anevil la pʁɛʁi]) is a commune in the Haute-Marne department in the Grand Est region in northeastern France.

== Population ==
Historical population
Year	Pop.	±% p.a.
1968	84	—
1975	82	−0.34%
1982	92	+1.66%
1990	85	−0.98%
1999	84	−0.13%
2007	70	−2.25%
2012	67	−0.87%
2017	86	+5.12%
2023	95	+1.67%
Source: INSEE

== See also ==
- Communes of the Haute-Marne department
