= Meures =

- Commune
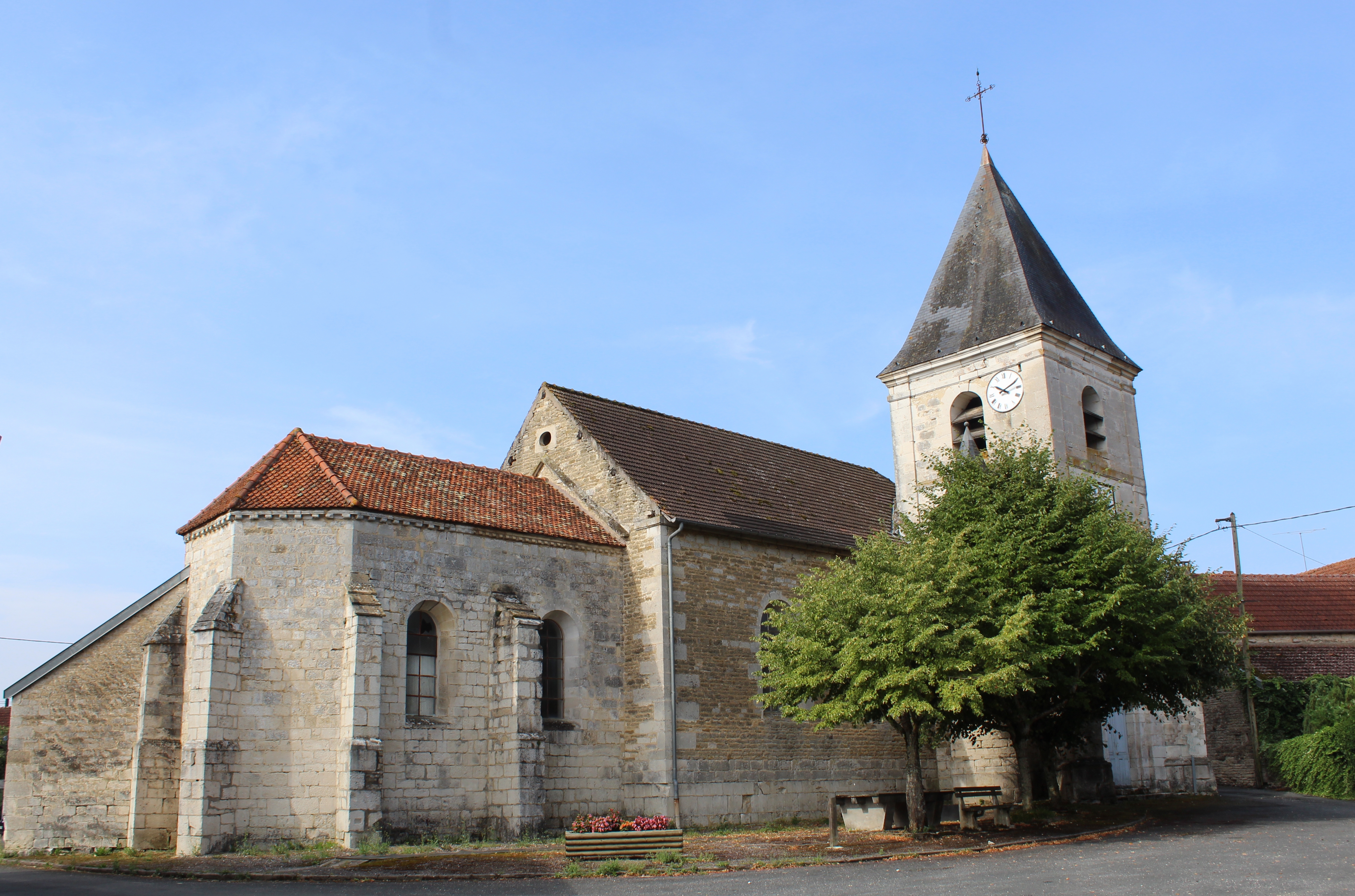
- The church in Meures
- Location of Meures
- Location within France Location within Grand Est
- Coordinates: 48°11′38″N 5°03′59″E
- Country: France
- Region: Grand Est
- Department: Haute-Marne
- Arrondissement: Chaumont
- Canton: Bologne
- Intercommunality: CA Chaumont

Government
  - Mayor (2020–2026): Sylvain Collot
- Area^{1}: 8.17 km^{2} (3.15 sq mi)
- Elevation: 273 m (896 ft)
- Population (2023): 130
  - Density: 16/km^{2} (41/sq mi)
- Demonym(s): Meurois, Meuroises
- Time zone: UTC+01:00 (CET)
  - Summer (DST): UTC+02:00 (CEST)
- INSEE/Postal code: 52322 /52310
- ^{1} French Land Register data, which excludes lakes, ponds, glaciers > 1 km^{2} (0.386 sq mi or 247 acres) and river estuaries.

Meures (French pronunciation: [mœʁ]) is a commune in the Haute-Marne department in north-eastern France.

== See also ==
- Communes of the Haute-Marne department
