= Oudincourt =

- Commune
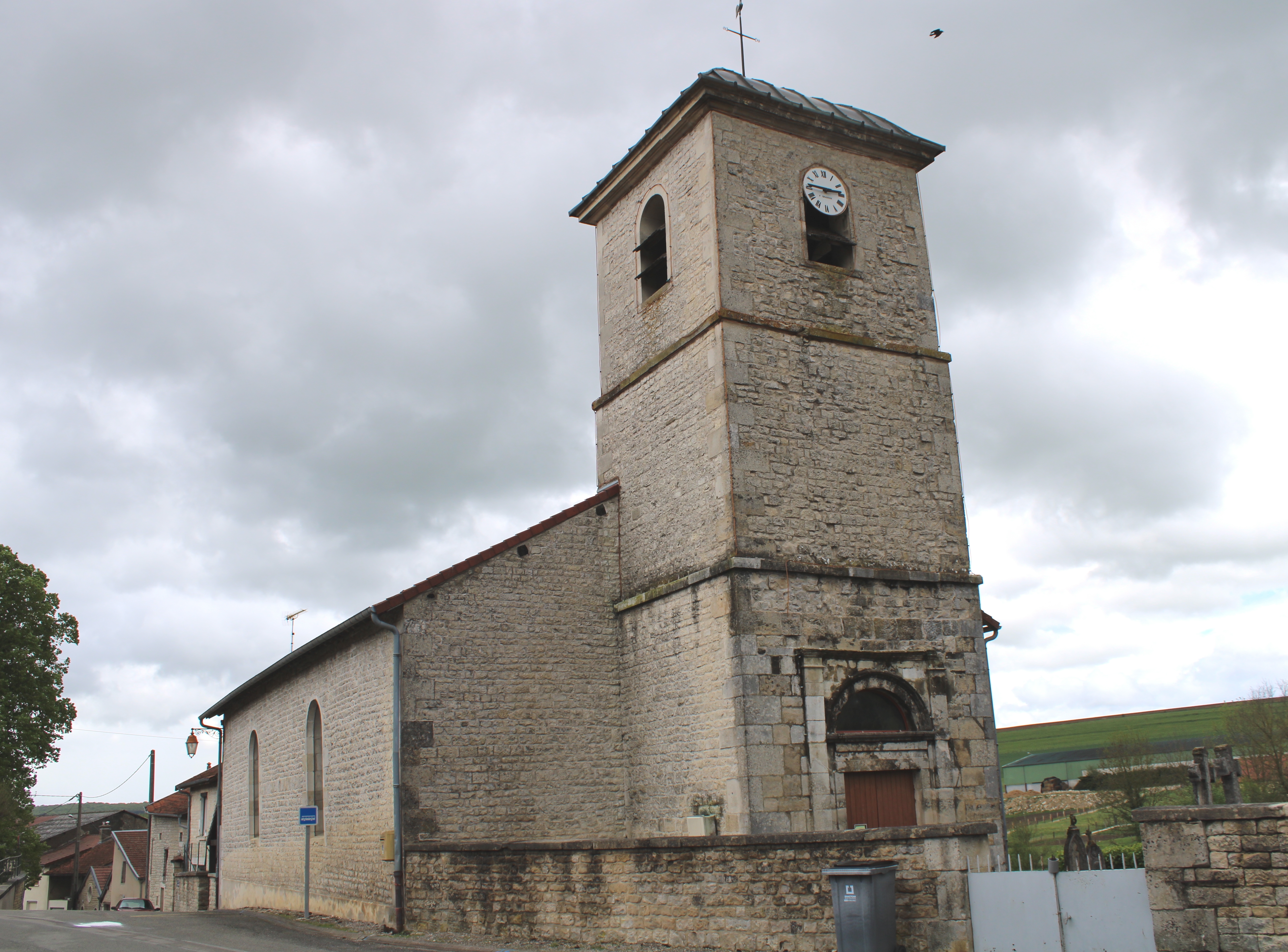
- The church in Oudincourt
- Location of Oudincourt
- Location within France Location within Grand Est
- Coordinates: 48°13′34″N 5°05′40″E
- Country: France
- Region: Grand Est
- Department: Haute-Marne
- Arrondissement: Chaumont
- Canton: Bologne
- Intercommunality: CA Chaumont

Government
  - Mayor (2024–2026): Yolande Martinot
- Area^{1}: 7.44 km^{2} (2.87 sq mi)
- Elevation: 240 m (790 ft)
- Population (2023): 141
  - Density: 19.0/km^{2} (49.1/sq mi)
- Demonym(s): Oudincourtois, Oudincourtoises
- Time zone: UTC+01:00 (CET)
  - Summer (DST): UTC+02:00 (CEST)
- INSEE/Postal code: 52371 /52310
- ^{1} French Land Register data, which excludes lakes, ponds, glaciers > 1 km^{2} (0.386 sq mi or 247 acres) and river estuaries.

Oudincourt (French pronunciation: [udɛ̃kuʁ]) is a commune in the Haute-Marne department in north-eastern France.

== See also ==
- Communes of the Haute-Marne department
