= Foulain =

- Commune
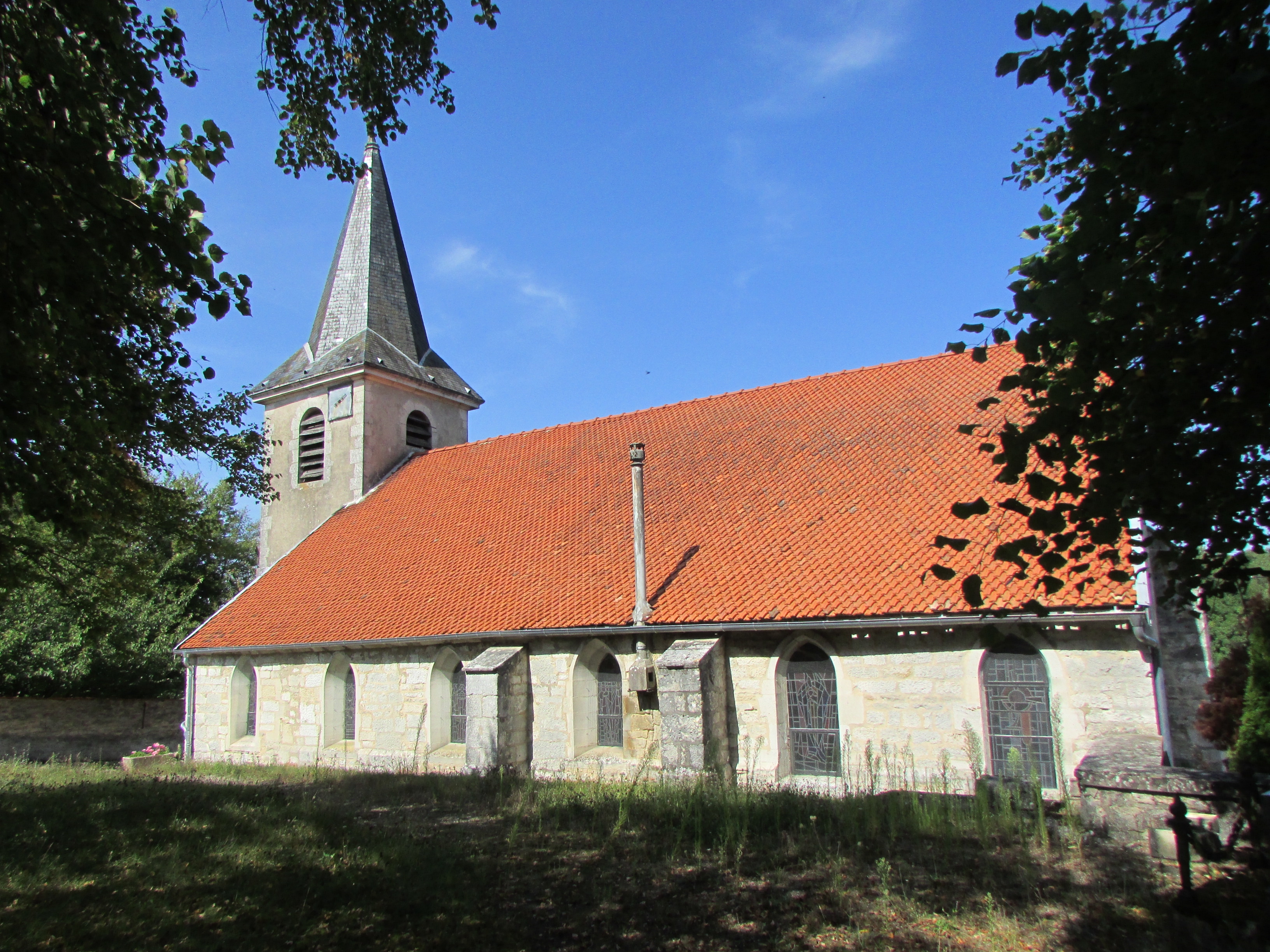
- The church in Foulain
- Location of Foulain
- Location within France Location within Grand Est
- Coordinates: 48°02′24″N 5°12′50″E
- Country: France
- Region: Grand Est
- Department: Haute-Marne
- Arrondissement: Chaumont
- Canton: Chaumont-3
- Intercommunality: CA Chaumont

Government
  - Mayor (2020–2026): Robert Henry
- Area^{1}: 26.28 km^{2} (10.15 sq mi)
- Elevation: 285 m (935 ft)
- Population (2023): 673
  - Density: 25.6/km^{2} (66.3/sq mi)
- Time zone: UTC+01:00 (CET)
  - Summer (DST): UTC+02:00 (CEST)
- INSEE/Postal code: 52205 /52800
- ^{1} French Land Register data, which excludes lakes, ponds, glaciers > 1 km^{2} (0.386 sq mi or 247 acres) and river estuaries.

Foulain (French pronunciation: [fulɛ̃]) is a commune in the Haute-Marne department in north-eastern France. It was created in 1973 by the merger of the former communes Crenay, Luzy-sur-Marne and Foulain.

== See also ==
- Communes of the Haute-Marne department
