= La Genevroye =

- Commune
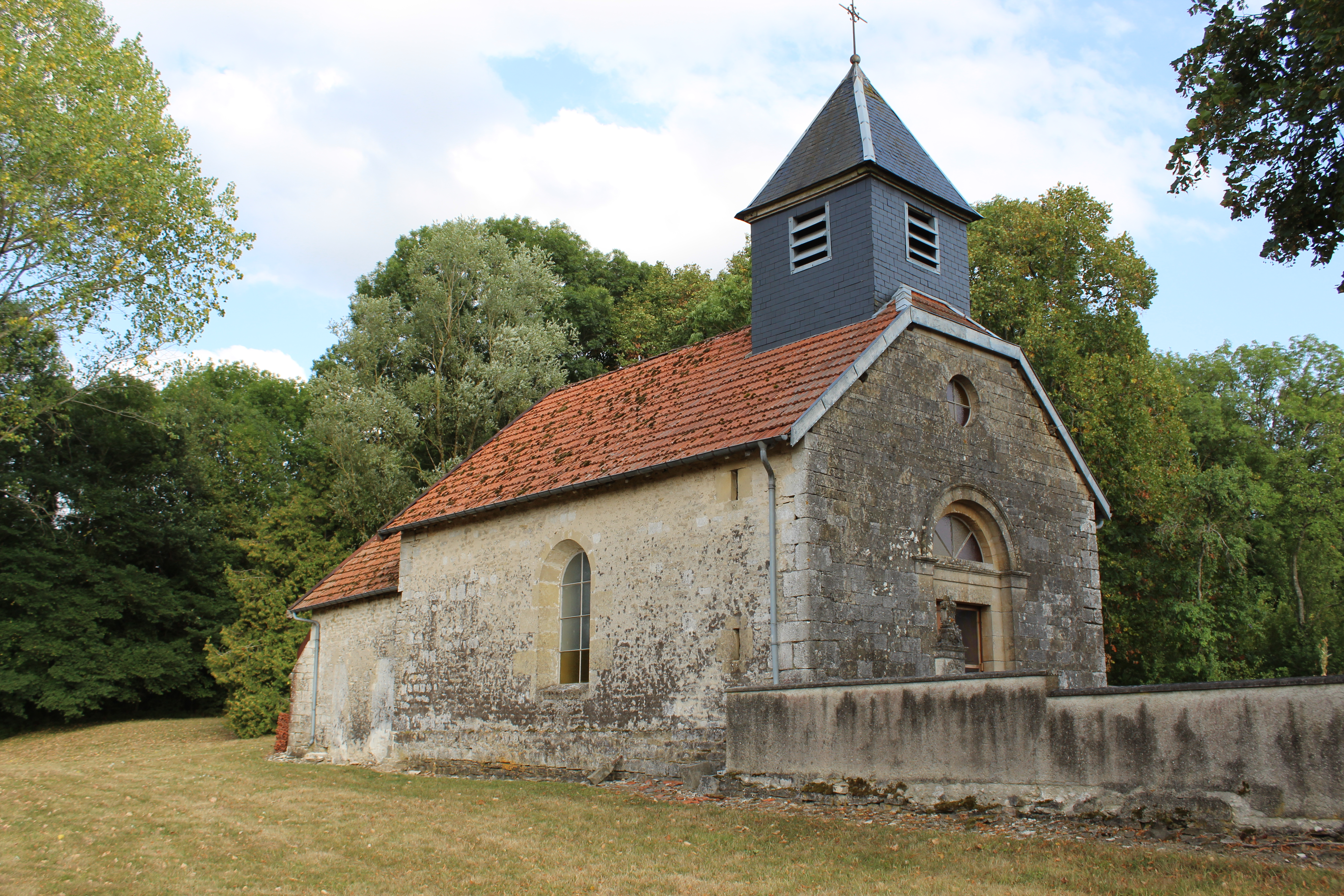
- The church in La Genevroye
- Location of La Genevroye
- Location within France Location within Grand Est
- Coordinates: 48°16′46″N 5°03′15″E
- Country: France
- Region: Grand Est
- Department: Haute-Marne
- Arrondissement: Chaumont
- Canton: Bologne
- Intercommunality: CA Chaumont

Government
  - Mayor (2020–2026): Laurent Pellouard
- Area^{1}: 2.83 km^{2} (1.09 sq mi)
- Elevation: 336 m (1,102 ft)
- Population (2023): 28
  - Density: 9.9/km^{2} (26/sq mi)
- Time zone: UTC+01:00 (CET)
  - Summer (DST): UTC+02:00 (CEST)
- INSEE/Postal code: 52214 /52320
- ^{1} French Land Register data, which excludes lakes, ponds, glaciers > 1 km^{2} (0.386 sq mi or 247 acres) and river estuaries.

La Genevroye (French pronunciation: [la ʒənvʁwa]) is a commune in the Haute-Marne department in north-eastern France.

== See also ==
- Communes of the Haute-Marne department
