= Consigny =

- Commune
- Location of Consigny
- Location within France Location within Grand Est
- Coordinates: 48°10′03″N 5°25′02″E
- Country: France
- Region: Grand Est
- Department: Haute-Marne
- Arrondissement: Chaumont
- Canton: Bologne
- Intercommunality: Meuse Rognon

Government
  - Mayor (2020–2026): Didier Petit
- Area^{1}: 10.95 km^{2} (4.23 sq mi)
- Elevation: 377 m (1,237 ft)
- Population (2023): 79
  - Density: 7.2/km^{2} (19/sq mi)
- Time zone: UTC+01:00 (CET)
  - Summer (DST): UTC+02:00 (CEST)
- INSEE/Postal code: 52142 /52700
- ^{1} French Land Register data, which excludes lakes, ponds, glaciers > 1 km^{2} (0.386 sq mi or 247 acres) and river estuaries.

Consigny (French pronunciation: [kɔ̃siɲi]) is a commune in the Haute-Marne department in north-eastern France.

== See also ==
- Communes of the Haute-Marne department
