= Froncles =

- Commune
- Location of Froncles
- Location within France Location within Grand Est
- Coordinates: 48°18′00″N 5°08′49″E
- Country: France
- Region: Grand Est
- Department: Haute-Marne
- Arrondissement: Chaumont
- Canton: Bologne
- Intercommunality: CA Chaumont

Government
  - Mayor (2020–2026): Patrice Voirin
- Area^{1}: 20.05 km^{2} (7.74 sq mi)
- Elevation: 219 m (719 ft)
- Highest elevation: 376 m (1,234 ft)
- Lowest elevation: 207 m (679 ft)
- Population (2023): 1,369
  - Density: 68.28/km^{2} (176.8/sq mi)
- Demonym(s): Fronclois, Froncloises
- Time zone: UTC+01:00 (CET)
  - Summer (DST): UTC+02:00 (CEST)
- INSEE/Postal code: 52211 /52320
- ^{1} French Land Register data, which excludes lakes, ponds, glaciers > 1 km^{2} (0.386 sq mi or 247 acres) and river estuaries.

Froncles (French pronunciation: [fʁɔ̃kl]) is a commune in the Haute-Marne department in north-eastern France.

== See also ==
- Communes of the Haute-Marne department
