= Rimaucourt =

- Commune
- Coat of arms
- Location of Rimaucourt
- Location within France Location within Grand Est
- Coordinates: 48°15′10″N 5°19′59″E
- Country: France
- Region: Grand Est
- Department: Haute-Marne
- Arrondissement: Chaumont
- Canton: Bologne
- Intercommunality: Meuse Rognon

Government
  - Mayor (2020–2026): Jean-François Gunther
- Area^{1}: 20.26 km^{2} (7.82 sq mi)
- Elevation: 260 m (850 ft)
- Population (2023): 609
  - Density: 30.1/km^{2} (77.9/sq mi)
- Time zone: UTC+01:00 (CET)
  - Summer (DST): UTC+02:00 (CEST)
- INSEE/Postal code: 52423 /52700
- ^{1} French Land Register data, which excludes lakes, ponds, glaciers > 1 km^{2} (0.386 sq mi or 247 acres) and river estuaries.

Rimaucourt (French pronunciation: [ʁimokuʁ]) is a commune in the Haute-Marne department in north-eastern France.

== See also ==
- Communes of the Haute-Marne department
