= Poinson-lès-Nogent =

- Commune
- Location of Poinson-lès-Nogent
- Location within France Location within Grand Est
- Coordinates: 47°59′44″N 5°22′09″E
- Country: France
- Region: Grand Est
- Department: Haute-Marne
- Arrondissement: Chaumont
- Canton: Nogent
- Intercommunality: CA Chaumont

Government
  - Mayor (2020–2026): Jean-Michel Konarski
- Area^{1}: 10.67 km^{2} (4.12 sq mi)
- Elevation: 390 m (1,280 ft)
- Population (2023): 144
  - Density: 13.5/km^{2} (35.0/sq mi)
- Demonym(s): Poinsonnais, Poinsonnaises
- Time zone: UTC+01:00 (CET)
  - Summer (DST): UTC+02:00 (CEST)
- INSEE/Postal code: 52396 /52800
- ^{1} French Land Register data, which excludes lakes, ponds, glaciers > 1 km^{2} (0.386 sq mi or 247 acres) and river estuaries.

Poinson-lès-Nogent (French pronunciation: [pwɛ̃sɔ̃ lɛ nɔʒɑ̃], literally Poinson near Nogent) is a commune in the Haute-Marne department in north-eastern France.

== See also ==
- Communes of the Haute-Marne department
