= Cerisières =

- Commune
- Location of Cerisières
- Location within France Location within Grand Est
- Coordinates: 48°18′30″N 5°04′52″E
- Country: France
- Region: Grand Est
- Department: Haute-Marne
- Arrondissement: Saint-Dizier
- Canton: Bologne
- Intercommunality: CA Chaumont

Government
  - Mayor (2020–2026): Stéphane Fontanesi
- Area^{1}: 10.02 km^{2} (3.87 sq mi)
- Elevation: 332 m (1,089 ft)
- Highest elevation: 403 m (1,322 ft)
- Lowest elevation: 210 m (690 ft)
- Population (2023): 87
  - Density: 8.7/km^{2} (22/sq mi)
- Demonym(s): Cerisièrois, Cerisièroises
- Time zone: UTC+01:00 (CET)
  - Summer (DST): UTC+02:00 (CEST)
- INSEE/Postal code: 52091 /52320
- ^{1} French Land Register data, which excludes lakes, ponds, glaciers > 1 km^{2} (0.386 sq mi or 247 acres) and river estuaries.

Cerisières (French pronunciation: [səʁizjɛʁ]) is a commune in the Haute-Marne department in north-eastern France.

== See also ==
- Communes of the Haute-Marne department
