= Vouécourt =

- Commune
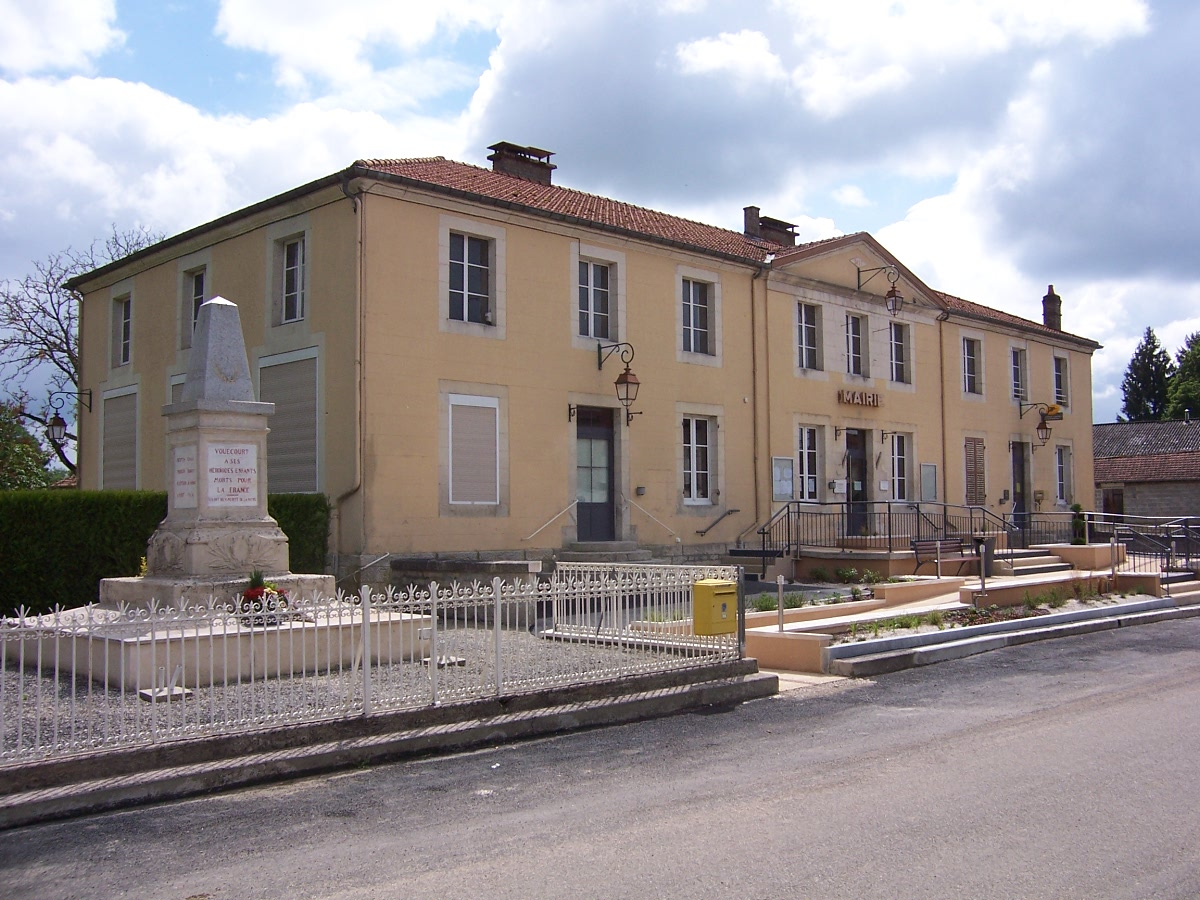
- The town hall in Vouécourt
- Location of Vouécourt
- Location within France Location within Grand Est
- Coordinates: 48°16′05″N 5°08′14″E
- Country: France
- Region: Grand Est
- Department: Haute-Marne
- Arrondissement: Chaumont
- Canton: Bologne
- Intercommunality: CA Chaumont

Government
  - Mayor (2020–2026): Hugues Fischer
- Area^{1}: 13.42 km^{2} (5.18 sq mi)
- Elevation: 288 m (945 ft)
- Population (2023): 210
  - Density: 16/km^{2} (41/sq mi)
- Time zone: UTC+01:00 (CET)
  - Summer (DST): UTC+02:00 (CEST)
- INSEE/Postal code: 52547 /52320
- ^{1} French Land Register data, which excludes lakes, ponds, glaciers > 1 km^{2} (0.386 sq mi or 247 acres) and river estuaries.

Vouécourt (French pronunciation: [vwekuʁ]) is a commune in the Haute-Marne department in north-eastern France.

== See also ==
- Communes of the Haute-Marne department
