= Chantraines =

- Commune
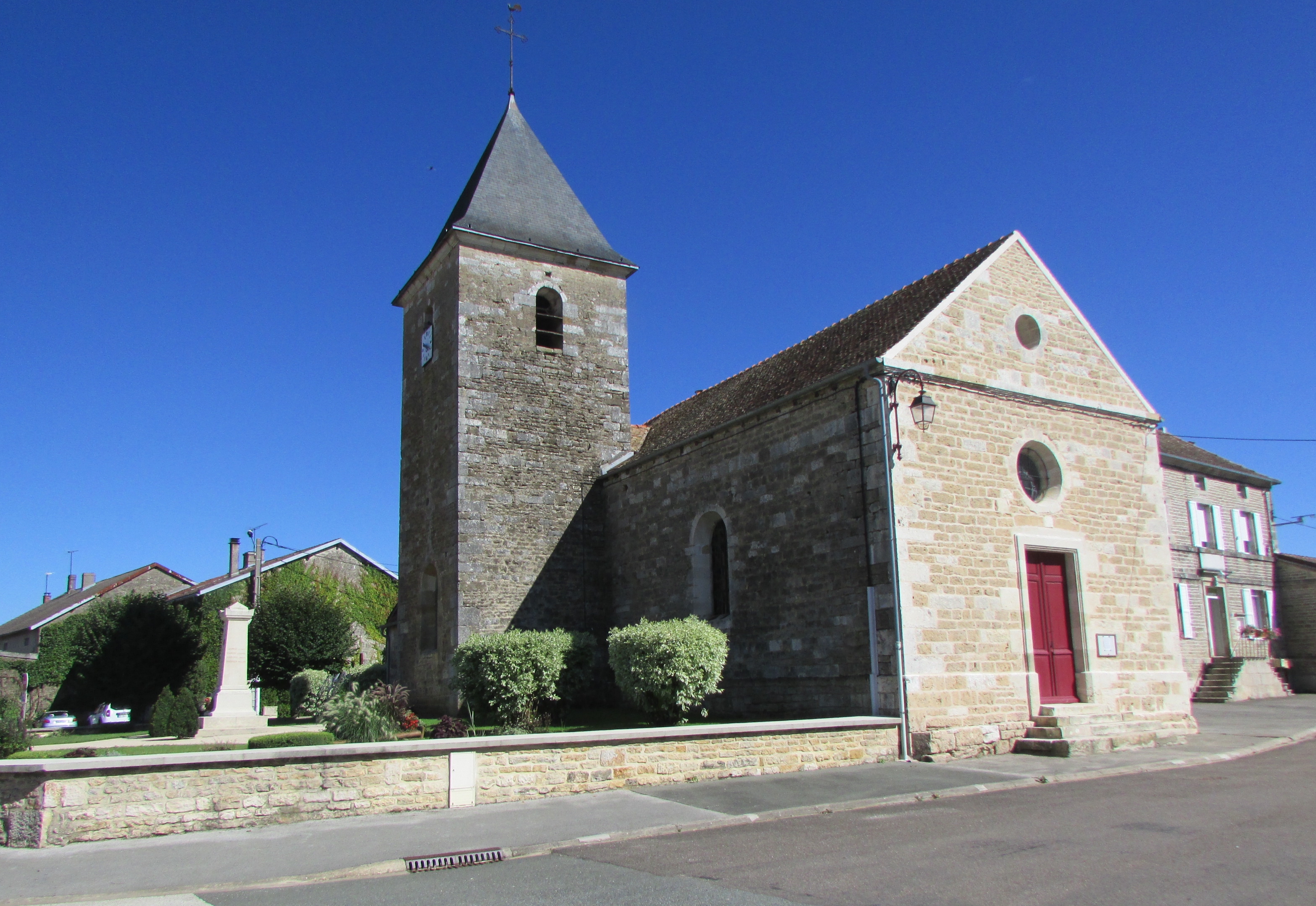
- The church in Chantraines
- Location of Chantraines
- Location within France Location within Grand Est
- Coordinates: 48°13′11″N 5°14′52″E
- Country: France
- Region: Grand Est
- Department: Haute-Marne
- Arrondissement: Chaumont
- Canton: Bologne
- Intercommunality: Meuse Rognon

Government
  - Mayor (2020–2026): Arnaud Van Coppenolle
- Area^{1}: 10.42 km^{2} (4.02 sq mi)
- Highest elevation: 380 m (1,250 ft)
- Lowest elevation: 277 m (909 ft)
- Population (2023): 199
  - Density: 19.1/km^{2} (49.5/sq mi)
- Time zone: UTC+01:00 (CET)
  - Summer (DST): UTC+02:00 (CEST)
- INSEE/Postal code: 52107 /52700
- ^{1} French Land Register data, which excludes lakes, ponds, glaciers > 1 km^{2} (0.386 sq mi or 247 acres) and river estuaries.

Chantraines (French pronunciation: [ʃɑ̃tʁɛn]) is a commune in the Haute-Marne department in north-eastern France.

== See also ==
- Communes of the Haute-Marne department
