= Vraincourt =

- Commune
- Location of Vraincourt
- Location within France Location within Grand Est
- Coordinates: 48°14′32″N 5°07′32″E
- Country: France
- Region: Grand Est
- Department: Haute-Marne
- Arrondissement: Chaumont
- Canton: Bologne
- Intercommunality: CA Chaumont

Government
  - Mayor (2020–2026): Fabien Contal
- Area^{1}: 3.48 km^{2} (1.34 sq mi)
- Elevation: 236 m (774 ft)
- Highest elevation: 387 m (1,270 ft)
- Lowest elevation: 225 m (738 ft)
- Population (2023): 81
  - Density: 23/km^{2} (60/sq mi)
- Time zone: UTC+01:00 (CET)
  - Summer (DST): UTC+02:00 (CEST)
- INSEE/Postal code: 52548 /52310
- ^{1} French Land Register data, which excludes lakes, ponds, glaciers > 1 km^{2} (0.386 sq mi or 247 acres) and river estuaries.

Vraincourt (French pronunciation: [vʁɛ̃kuʁ]) is a commune in the Haute-Marne department in north-eastern France.

== See also ==
- Communes of the Haute-Marne department
