= Doulaincourt-Saucourt =

- Commune
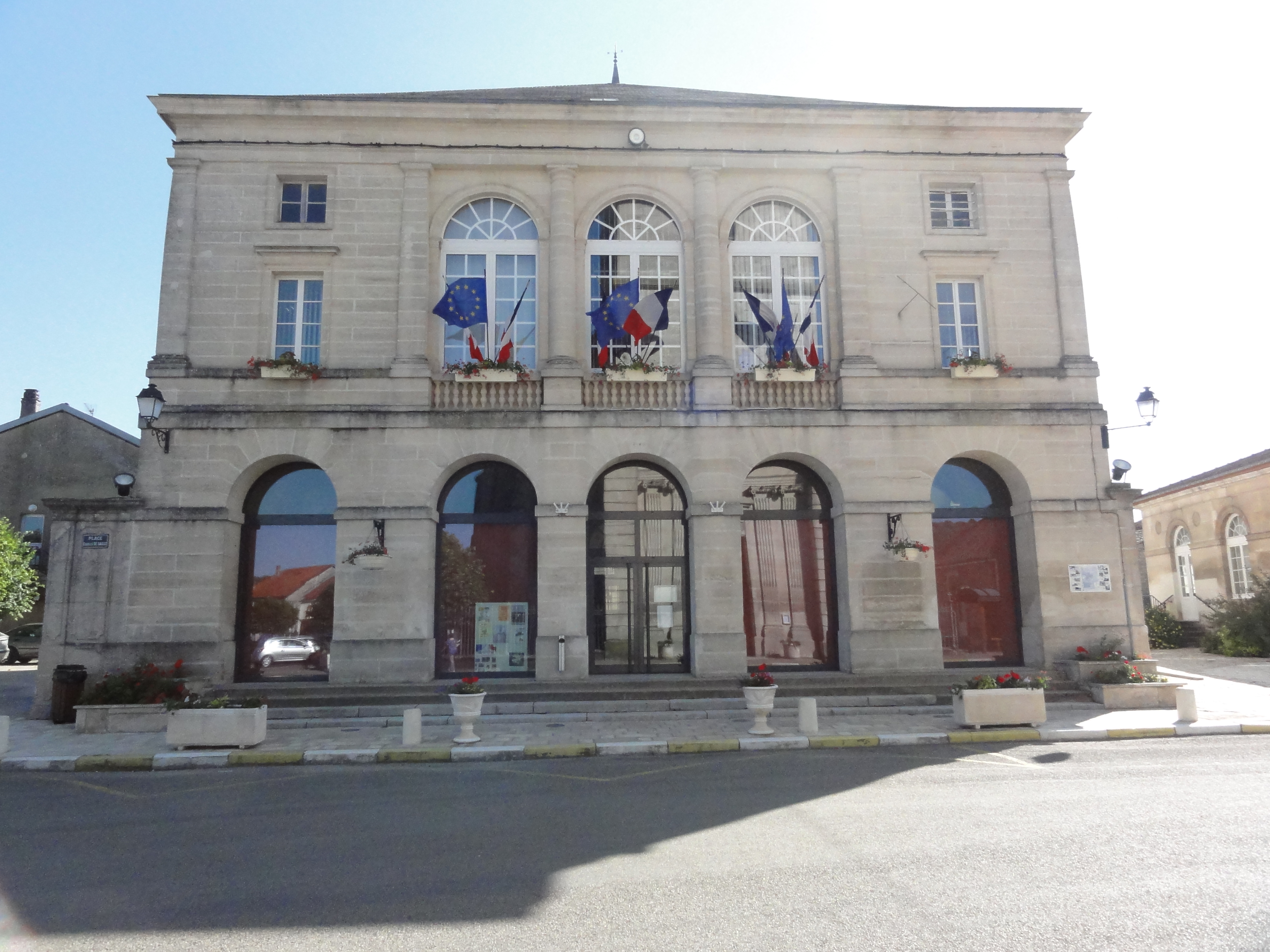
- The town hall in Doulaincourt-Saucourt

- Coat of arms
- Location of Doulaincourt-Saucourt
- Location within France Location within Grand Est
- Coordinates: 48°19′25″N 5°12′24″E
- Country: France
- Region: Grand Est
- Department: Haute-Marne
- Arrondissement: Saint-Dizier
- Canton: Bologne
- Intercommunality: Meuse Rognon

Government
  - Mayor (2020–2026): Frédéric Fabre
- Area^{1}: 43.86 km^{2} (16.93 sq mi)
- Elevation: 220 m (720 ft)
- Highest elevation: 389 m (1,276 ft)
- Lowest elevation: 207 m (679 ft)
- Population (2023): 731
  - Density: 16.7/km^{2} (43.2/sq mi)
- Time zone: UTC+01:00 (CET)
  - Summer (DST): UTC+02:00 (CEST)
- INSEE/Postal code: 52177 /52270
- ^{1} French Land Register data, which excludes lakes, ponds, glaciers > 1 km^{2} (0.386 sq mi or 247 acres) and river estuaries.

Doulaincourt-Saucourt (French pronunciation: [dulɛ̃kuʁ sokuʁ]) is a commune in the Haute-Marne department in north-eastern France. It was created in 1972 by the merger of two former communes: Doulaincourt and Saucourt-sur-Rognon.

== See also ==
- Communes of the Haute-Marne department

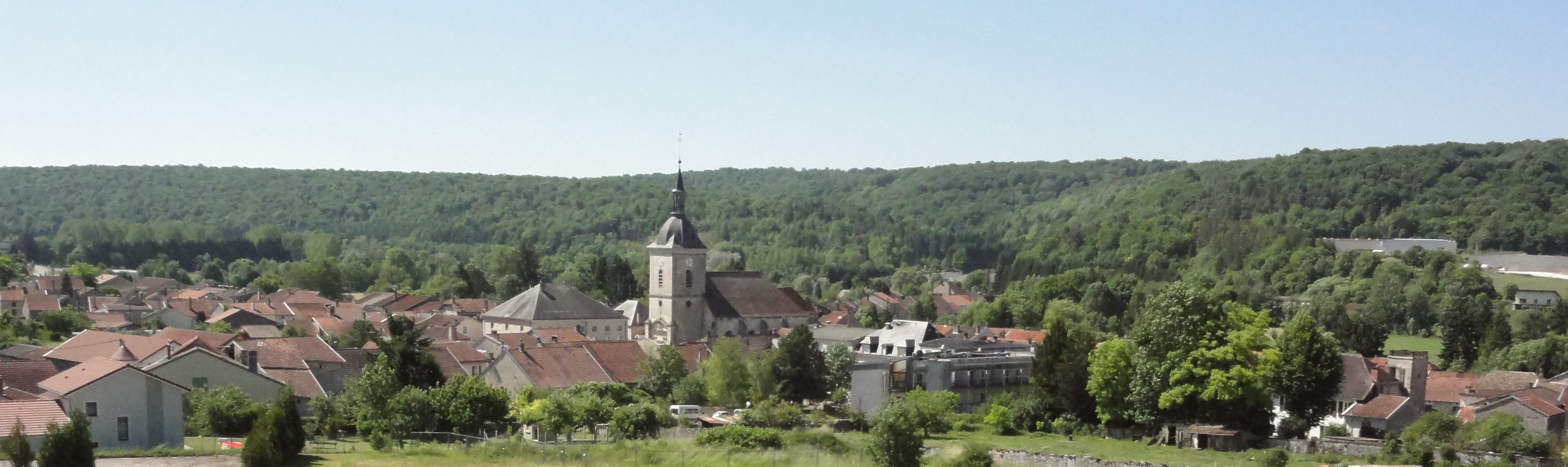
View of Doulaincourt

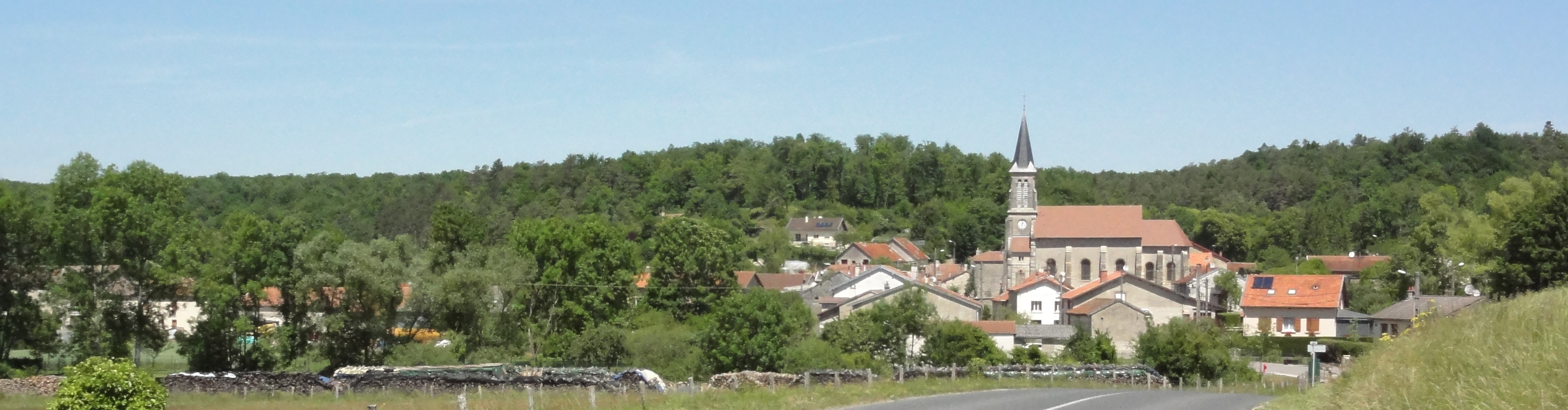
View of Saucourt-sur-Rognon
