= Communauté d'agglomération de Chaumont =

Chaumont
- Communauté d'agglomération
- Interactive map of Chaumont
- Coordinates: 48°08′N 05°08′E
- Country: France
- Region: Grand Est
- Department: Haute-Marne
- No. of communes: {{{nbcomm}}}
- Established: 2017
- Area: 927.0 km^{2} (357.9 sq mi)
- Population (2019): 44,441
  - Density: 47.94/km^{2} (124.2/sq mi)
- Website: www.agglo-chaumont.fr

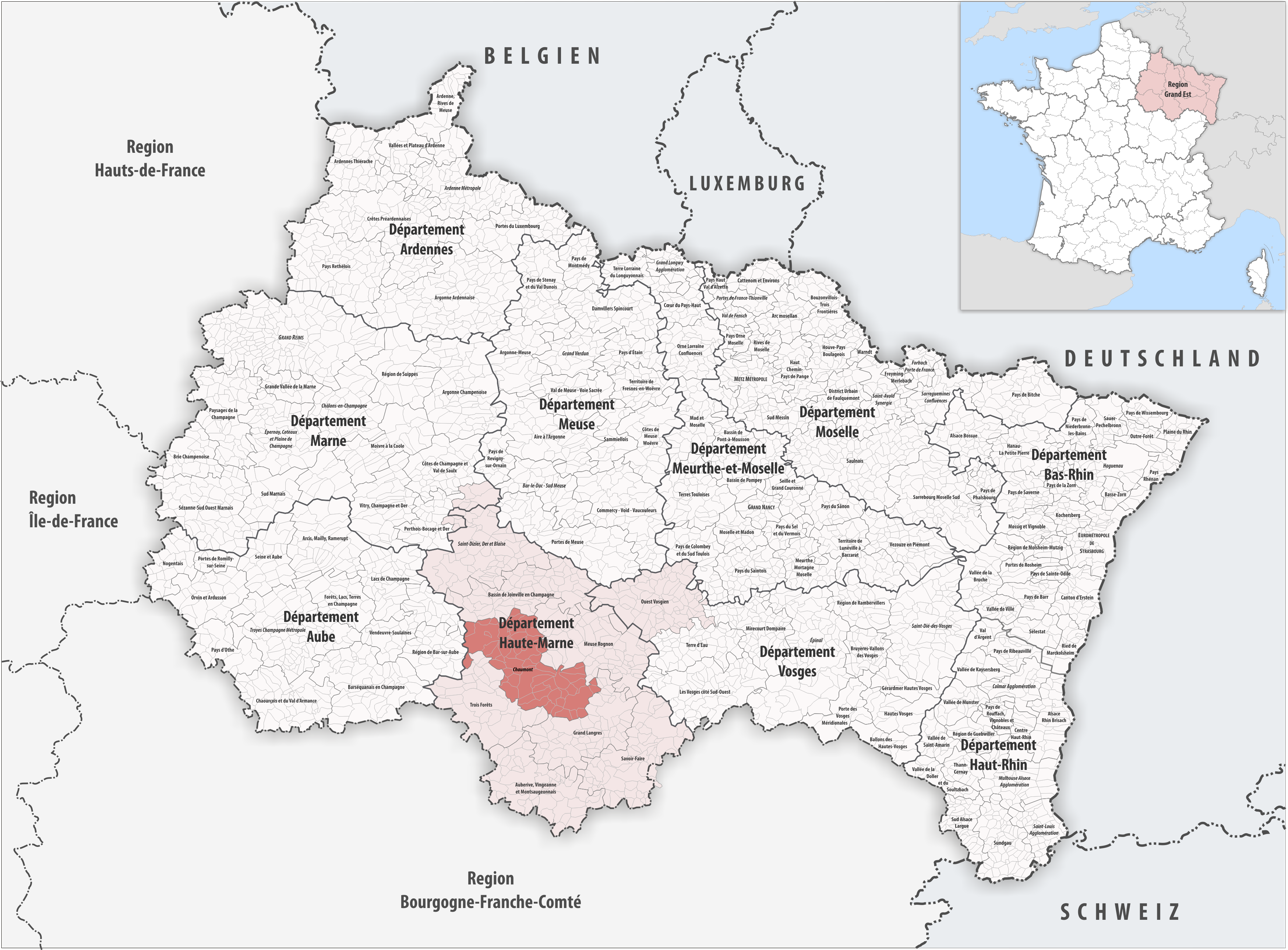
Location of the Chaumont municipal association.

Communauté d'agglomération de Chaumont is the communauté d'agglomération, an intercommunal structure, centred on the town of Chaumont. It is located in the Haute-Marne department, in the Grand Est region, northeastern France. Created in 2017, its seat is in Chaumont. Its area is 927.0 km^{2}. Its population was 44,441 in 2019, of which 21,847 in Chaumont proper.

== Composition ==
The communauté d'agglomération consists of the following 63 communes:

1. Ageville
2. Annéville-la-Prairie
3. Biesles
4. Blaisy
5. Bologne
6. Brethenay
7. Briaucourt
8. Buxières-lès-Villiers
9. Cerisières
10. Chamarandes-Choignes
11. Chaumont
12. Colombey-les-Deux-Églises
13. Condes
14. Curmont
15. Cuves
16. Daillancourt
17. Esnouveaux
18. Euffigneix
19. Forcey
20. Foulain
21. Froncles
22. La Genevroye
23. Gillancourt
24. Guindrecourt-sur-Blaise
25. Jonchery
26. Juzennecourt
27. Lachapelle-en-Blaisy
28. Lamancine
29. Lanques-sur-Rognon
30. Laville-aux-Bois
31. Louvières
32. Luzy-sur-Marne
33. Mandres-la-Côte
34. Marbéville
35. Marnay-sur-Marne
36. Meures
37. Mirbel
38. Neuilly-sur-Suize
39. Ninville
40. Nogent
41. Ormoy-lès-Sexfontaines
42. Oudincourt
43. Poinson-lès-Nogent
44. Poulangy
45. Rennepont
46. Riaucourt
47. Rizaucourt-Buchey
48. Rochefort-sur-la-Côte
49. Rouécourt
50. Sarcey
51. Semoutiers-Montsaon
52. Sexfontaines
53. Soncourt-sur-Marne
54. Thivet
55. Treix
56. Verbiesles
57. Vesaignes-sur-Marne
58. Viéville
59. Vignory
60. Villiers-le-Sec
61. Vitry-lès-Nogent
62. Vouécourt
63. Vraincourt
