= Rouécourt =

- Commune
- Location of Rouécourt
- Location within France Location within Grand Est
- Coordinates: 48°19′30″N 5°04′09″E
- Country: France
- Region: Grand Est
- Department: Haute-Marne
- Arrondissement: Saint-Dizier
- Canton: Bologne
- Intercommunality: CA Chaumont

Government
  - Mayor (2020–2026): Michel Driout
- Area^{1}: 7.82 km^{2} (3.02 sq mi)
- Elevation: 300 m (980 ft)
- Highest elevation: 390 m (1,280 ft)
- Lowest elevation: 277 m (909 ft)
- Population (2023): 48
  - Density: 6.1/km^{2} (16/sq mi)
- Time zone: UTC+01:00 (CET)
  - Summer (DST): UTC+02:00 (CEST)
- INSEE/Postal code: 52436 /52320
- ^{1} French Land Register data, which excludes lakes, ponds, glaciers > 1 km^{2} (0.386 sq mi or 247 acres) and river estuaries.

Rouécourt (French pronunciation: [ʁwekuʁ]) is a commune in the Haute-Marne department in north-eastern France.

== See also ==
- Communes of the Haute-Marne department
