= Briaucourt, Haute-Marne =

Briaucourt
- Commune
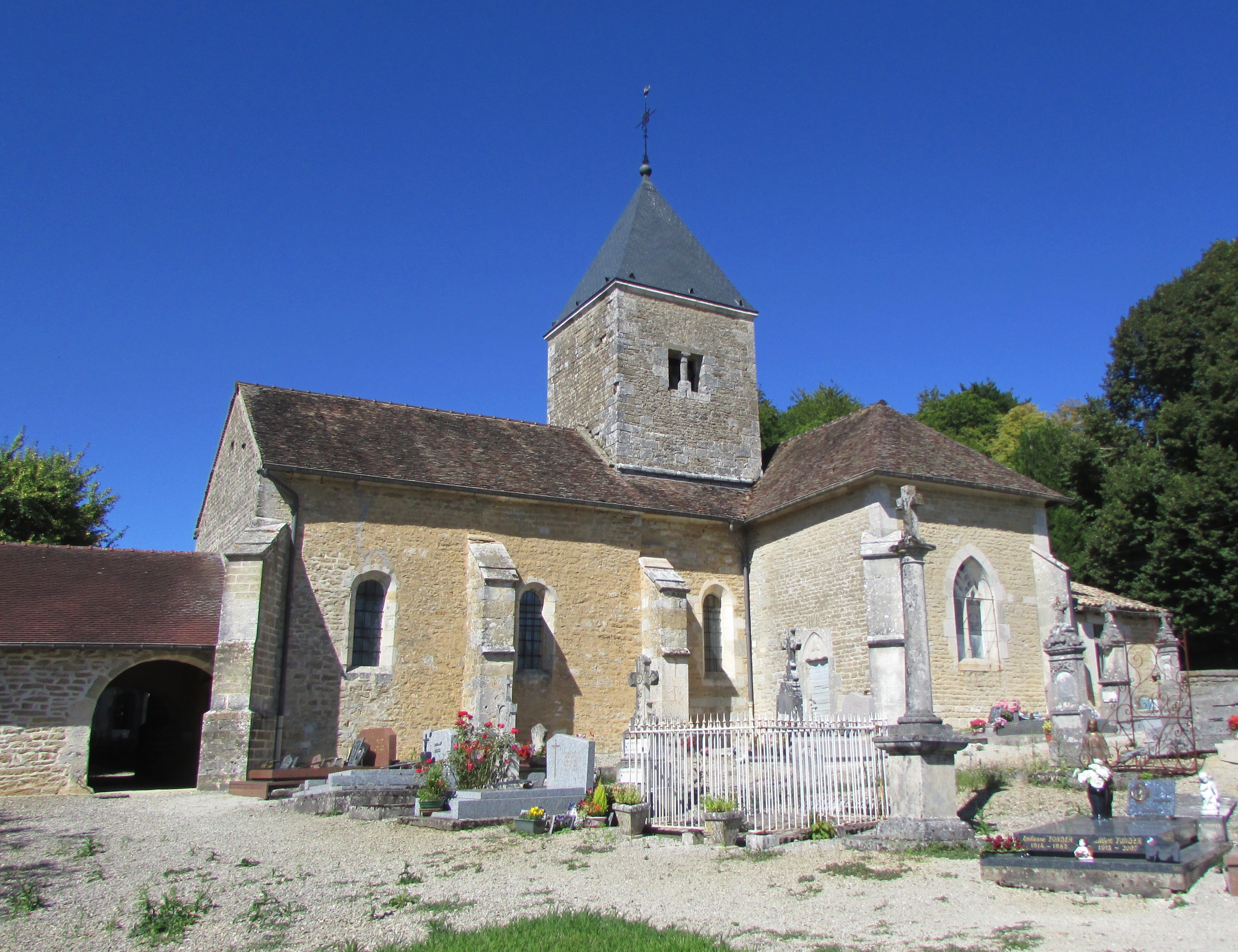
- The church in Briaucourt

- Coat of arms
- Location of Briaucourt
- Location within France Location within Grand Est
- Coordinates: 48°12′32″N 5°11′21″E
- Country: France
- Region: Grand Est
- Department: Haute-Marne
- Arrondissement: Chaumont
- Canton: Bologne
- Intercommunality: CA Chaumont

Government
  - Mayor (2023–2026): Marie-Christine Laurence
- Area^{1}: 9.47 km^{2} (3.66 sq mi)
- Elevation: 275 m (902 ft)
- Population (2023): 168
  - Density: 17.7/km^{2} (45.9/sq mi)
- Time zone: UTC+01:00 (CET)
  - Summer (DST): UTC+02:00 (CEST)
- INSEE/Postal code: 52075 /52700
- ^{1} French Land Register data, which excludes lakes, ponds, glaciers > 1 km^{2} (0.386 sq mi or 247 acres) and river estuaries.

Briaucourt (French pronunciation: [bʁijokuʁ]) is a commune in the Haute-Marne department in northeastern France.

== Population ==
Historical population
Year	Pop.	±% p.a.
1968	139	—
1975	119	−2.19%
1982	157	+4.04%
1990	207	+3.52%
1999	201	−0.33%
2007	196	−0.31%
2012	193	−0.31%
2017	181	−1.28%
2023	168	−1.23%
Source: INSEE

== See also ==
- Communes of the Haute-Marne department
