= Mareilles =

- Commune
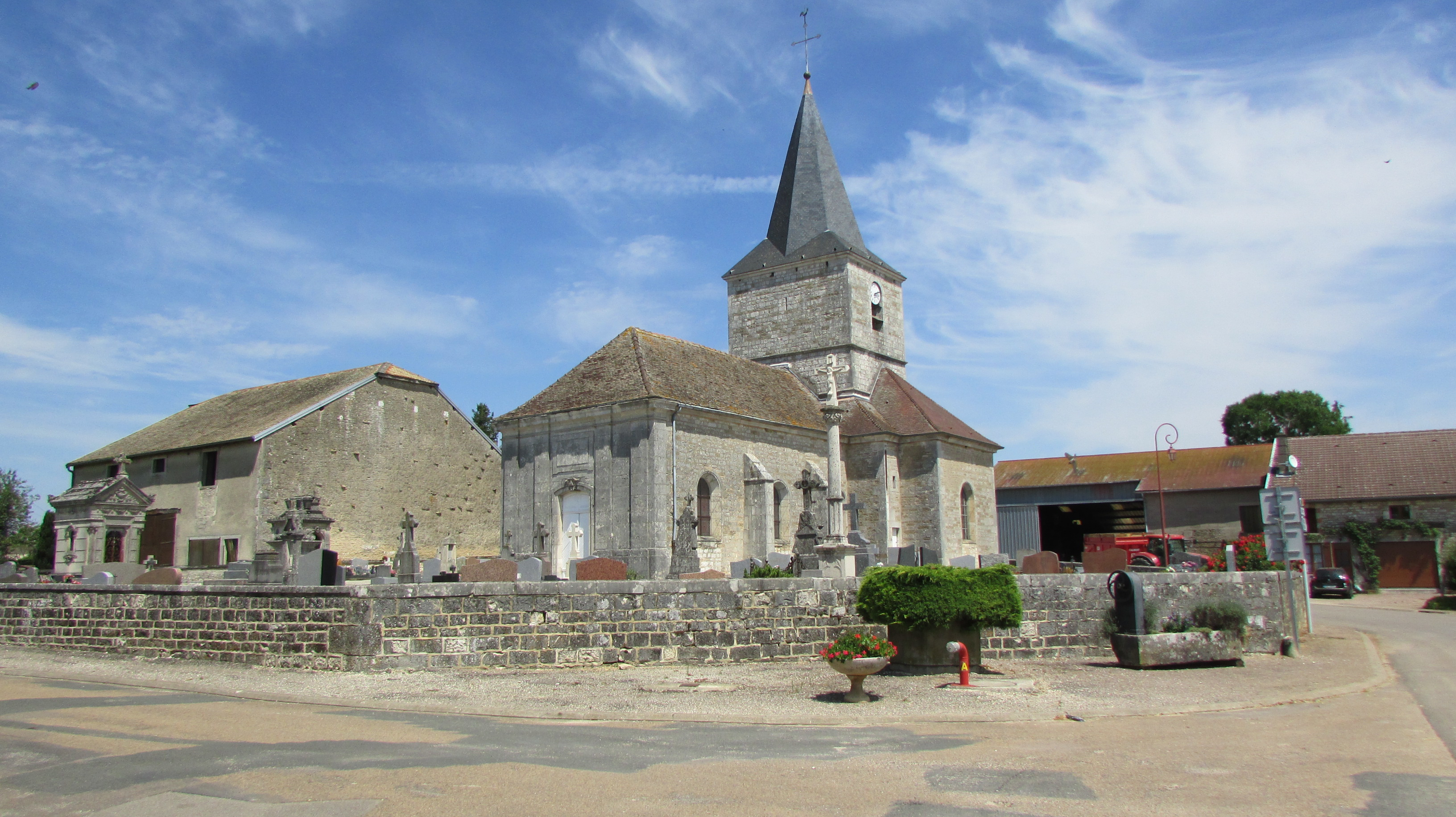
- The church in Mareilles

- Coat of arms
- Location of Mareilles
- Location within France Location within Grand Est
- Coordinates: 48°11′02″N 5°15′50″E
- Country: France
- Region: Grand Est
- Department: Haute-Marne
- Arrondissement: Chaumont
- Canton: Bologne
- Intercommunality: Meuse Rognon

Government
  - Mayor (2020–2026): Luc Vautrin
- Area^{1}: 22.28 km^{2} (8.60 sq mi)
- Elevation: 348 m (1,142 ft)
- Population (2023): 139
  - Density: 6.24/km^{2} (16.2/sq mi)
- Time zone: UTC+01:00 (CET)
  - Summer (DST): UTC+02:00 (CEST)
- INSEE/Postal code: 52313 /52700
- ^{1} French Land Register data, which excludes lakes, ponds, glaciers > 1 km^{2} (0.386 sq mi or 247 acres) and river estuaries.

Mareilles (French pronunciation: [maʁɛj]) is a commune in the Haute-Marne department in north-eastern France.

== See also ==
- Communes of the Haute-Marne department
