= Meuse =

River in western Europe

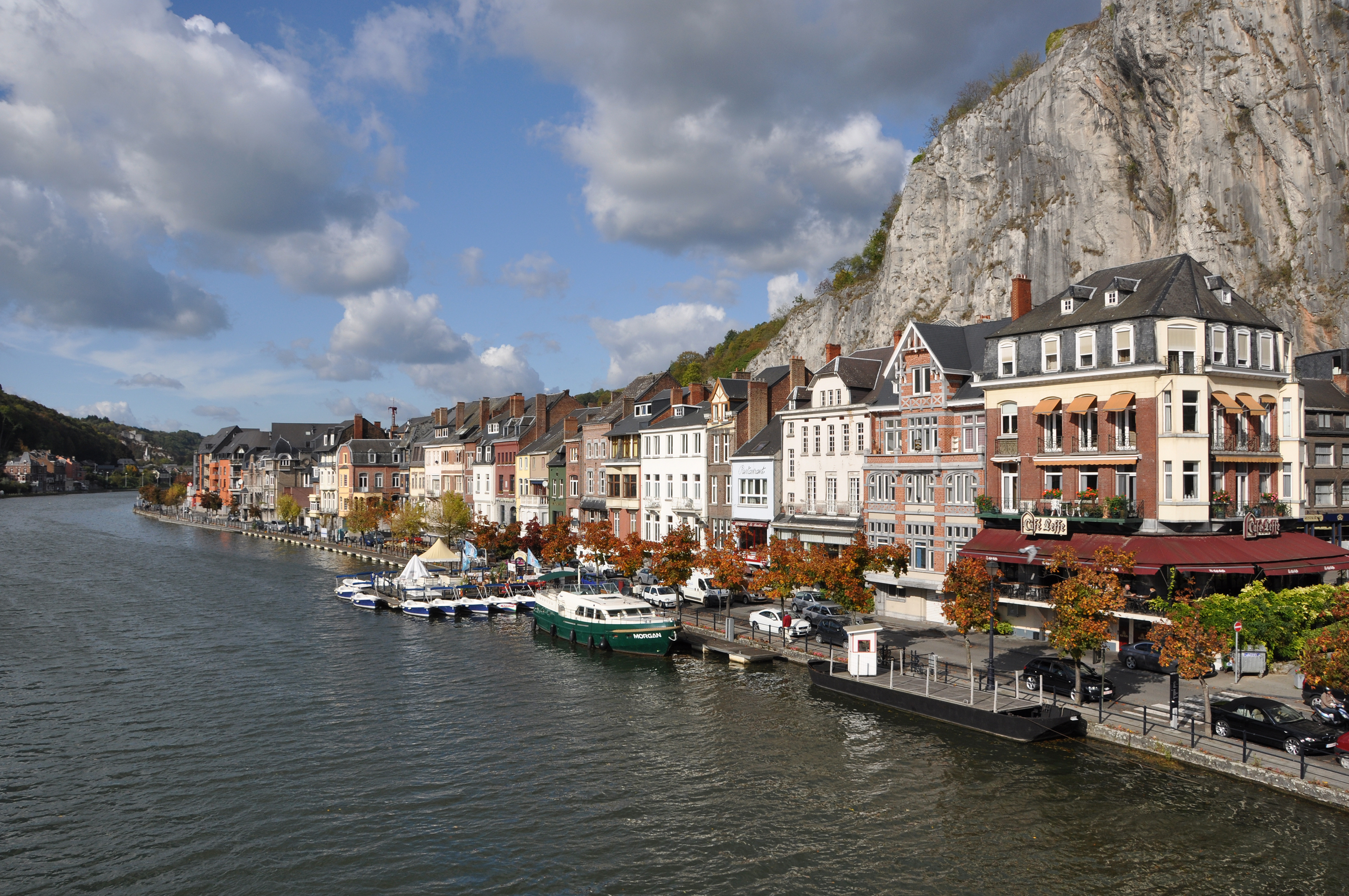
- The Meuse at Dinant

- Basin of the Meuse
- Native name: Meuse (French); Moûze (Walloon); Maas (Dutch); Maos (Limburgish)

Location
- Countries: France; Belgium; Netherlands
- Region: Western Europe
- Cities: Verdun (France); Sedan (France); Charleville-Mézières (France); Namur (Belgium); Liège (Belgium); Maastricht (Netherlands); Venlo (Netherlands); Rotterdam (Netherlands)

Physical characteristics
- Source
  - location: Pouilly-en-Bassigny, Le Châtelet-sur-Meuse, Haute-Marne, Grand Est, France
  - coordinates: 47.9867°N 5.6167°E
  - elevation: 409 m (1,342 ft)
- Mouth: North Sea
  - location: Hollands Diep, North Brabant/South Holland, Netherlands
  - coordinates: 51.715°N 4.6678°E
  - elevation: 0 m (0 ft)
- Length: 925 km (575 mi)
- Basin size: 34,548 km^{2} (13,339 sq mi)
- Discharge
  - average: 350 m^{3}/s (12,000 cu ft/s)

The Meuse (Note: English: /mjuːz/ MEWZ, UK also /mɜːz/, US also /mɜːrz, mʌz/ MU(R)Z, French: [møz]; Walloon: Moûze [muːs].) or Maas (Note: English: /mɑːs/ MAHSS, Dutch: [maːs]; Limburgish: Maos [mɔːs] or Maas [maːs].) is a major European river, rising in France and flowing through Belgium and the Netherlands before draining into the North Sea from the Rhine–Meuse–Scheldt Delta. It has a total length of 925 km (575 miles).

== History ==
From 1301, the upper Meuse roughly marked the western border of the Holy Roman Empire with the Kingdom of France, after Count Henry III of Bar had to receive the western part of the County of Bar (Barrois mouvant) as a French fief from the hands of King Philip IV. In 1408, a Burgundian army led by John the Fearless went to the aid of John III against the citizens of Liège, who were in open revolt. After the battle, which saw the men from Liège defeated, John ordered the drowning in the Meuse of burghers and noblemen in Liège whose loyalties he suspected.

The border remained relatively stable until the annexation of the Three Bishoprics Metz, Toul and Verdun by King Henry II in 1552 and the occupation of the Duchy of Lorraine by the forces of King Louis XIII in 1633. Its lower Belgian (Walloon) portion, part of the sillon industriel, was the first fully industrialized area in continental Europe.

The Afgedamde Maas was created in the late Middle Ages, when a major flood made a connection between the Maas and the Merwede at the town of Woudrichem. From that moment on, the current Afgedamde Maas was the main branch of the lower Meuse. The former main branch eventually silted up and is today called the Oude Maasje. In the late 19th century and early 20th century the connection between the Maas and Rhine was closed off and the Maas was given a new, artificial mouth – the Bergse Maas. The resulting separation of the rivers Rhine and Maas reduced the risk of flooding and was considered to be the greatest achievement in Dutch hydraulic engineering before the completion of the Zuiderzee Works and Delta Works. The former main branch was, after the dam at its southern inlet was completed in 1904, renamed Afgedamde Maas and no longer receives water from the Maas.

The Meuse and its crossings were a key objective of the Battle of France, the Battle of Sedan and also for the last major German WWII counter-offensive on the Western Front, the Battle of the Bulge in December 1944 and January 1945.

The Meuse is represented in the documentary The River People released in 2012 by Xavier Istasse.

In July 2021, the Meuse basin was one of the many regions in Europe to experience catastrophic flooding during the 2021 European floods.

== Etymology ==
The name Meuse is derived from the French name of the river, derived from its Latin name, Mosa, which ultimately derives from the Celtic or Proto-Celtic name *Mosā. This probably derives from the same root as English "maze", referring to the river's twists and turns.

The Dutch name Maas descends from Middle Dutch Mase, which comes from the presumed but unattested Old Dutch form *Masa, from Proto-Germanic *Masō. Modern Dutch and German Maas and Limburgish Maos preserve this Germanic form. Despite the similarity, the Germanic name is not derived from the Celtic name, judging from the change from earlier o into a, which is characteristic of the Germanic languages.

== Geography ==
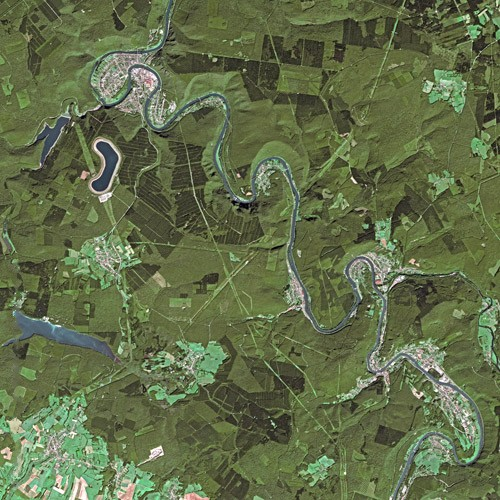
The Meuse seen from SPOT satellite. The village in the lower right of the photo is Bogny-sur-Meuse; the village in the upper left is Revin.

The Meuse rises in Pouilly-en-Bassigny, commune of Le Châtelet-sur-Meuse on the Langres plateau in France from where it flows northwards past Sedan (the head of navigation) and Charleville-Mézières into Belgium.

At Namur it is joined by the Sambre. Beyond Namur the Meuse winds eastwards and passes Liège before turning north. The river then forms part of the Belgian-Dutch border, except that at Maastricht the border lies further to the west. In the Netherlands it continues northwards through Venlo closely along the border to Germany, then turns towards the west, where it runs parallel to the Waal and forms part of the extensive Rhine–Meuse–Scheldt delta, together with the Scheldt to its south and the Rhine to the north. The river has been divided near Heusden into the Afgedamde Maas on the right and the Bergse Maas on the left. The Bergse Maas continues under the name of Amer, which is part of De Biesbosch. The Afgedamde Maas joins the Waal, the main stem of the Rhine at Woudrichem, and then flows under the name of Boven Merwede to Hardinxveld-Giessendam, where it splits into Nieuwe Merwede and Beneden Merwede. Near Lage Zwaluwe, the Nieuwe Merwede joins the Amer, forming the Hollands Diep, which splits into Grevelingen and Haringvliet, before finally flowing into the North Sea.

The Meuse is crossed by railway bridges between the following stations (on the left and right banks respectively):

- Belgium:
  - Hasselt (Belgium) – Maastricht (Netherlands)
- Netherlands:
  - Weert - Roermond
  - Blerick – Venlo
  - Cuijk – Mook-Molenhoek
  - Ravenstein – Wijchen
  - 's-Hertogenbosch – Zaltbommel

There are also numerous road bridges and around 32 ferry crossings.

The Meuse is navigable over a substantial part of its total length: In the Netherlands and Belgium, the river is part of the major inland navigation infrastructure, connecting the Rotterdam-Amsterdam-Antwerp port areas to the industrial areas upstream: 's-Hertogenbosch, Venlo, Maastricht, Liège, Namur. Between Maastricht and Maasbracht, an unnavigable section of the Meuse is bypassed by the 36 km (22.4 mi) Juliana Canal. South of Namur, further upstream, the river can only carry more modest vessels, although a barge as long as 100 m (328 ft). can still reach the French border town of Givet.

From Givet, the river is canalized over a distance of 272 kilometres (169 mi). The canalized Meuse used to be called the "Canal de l'Est — Branche Nord" but was recently rebaptized into "Canal de la Meuse". The waterway can be used by the smallest barges that are still in use commercially almost 40 m (131 ft) long and just over 5 metres (16 ft) wide. Just upstream of the town of Commercy, the Canal de la Meuse connects with the Marne–Rhine Canal by means of a short diversion canal.

The Cretaceous sea reptile Mosasaurus is named after the river Meuse. The first fossils of it were discovered outside Maastricht in 1780.

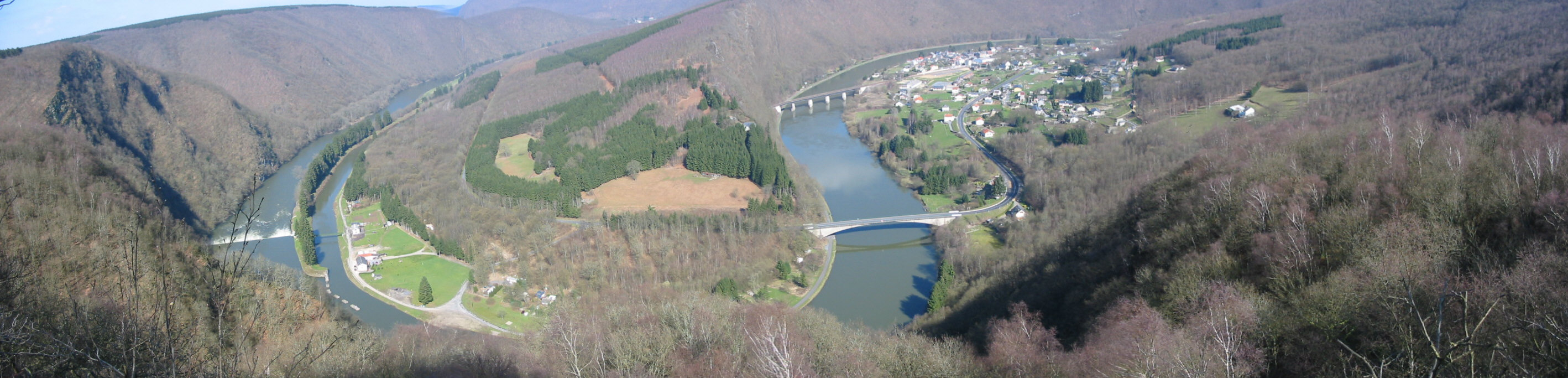
A view of the Meuse in the French Ardennes at Laifour

== Basin area ==
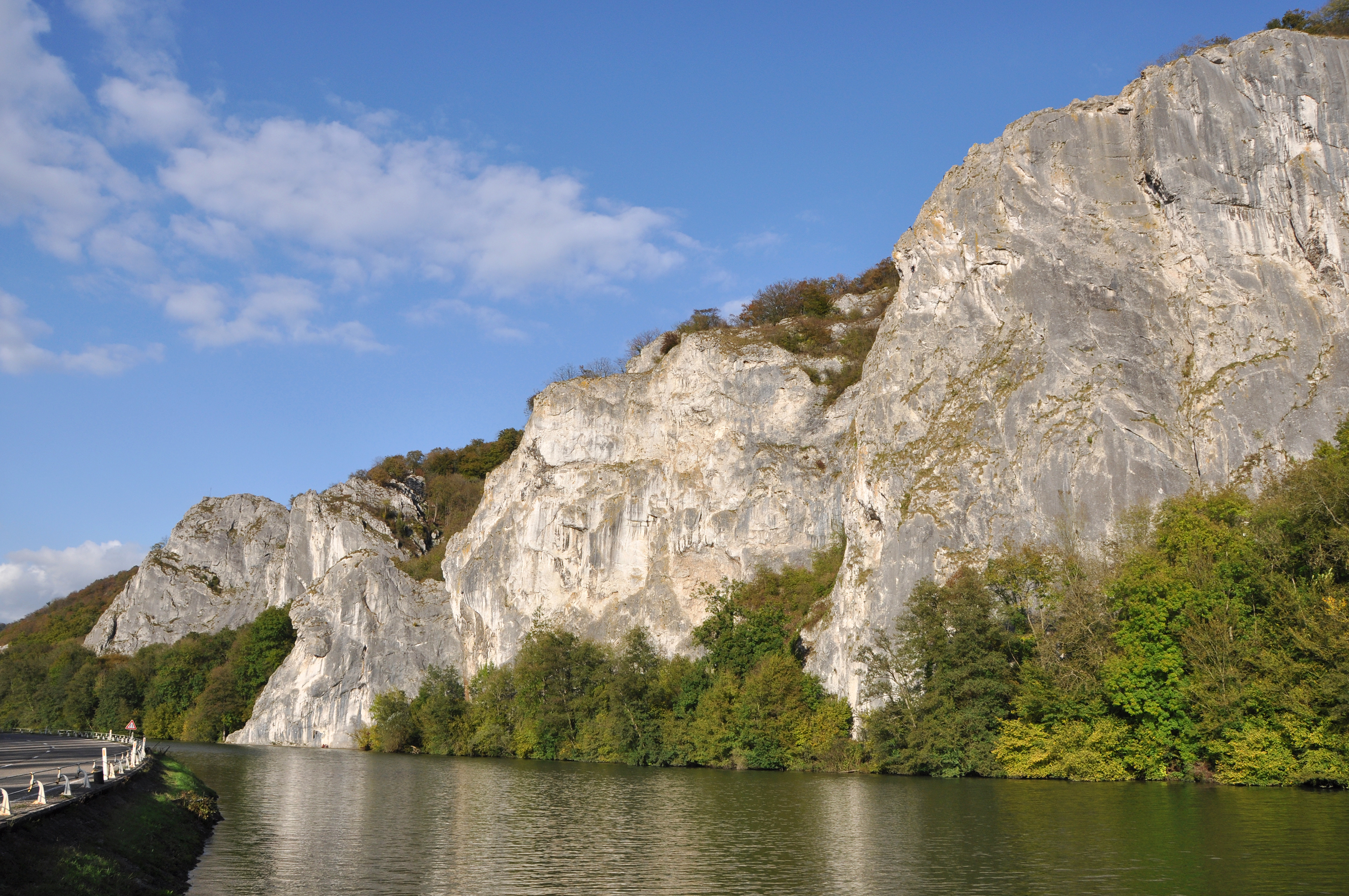
The Meuse and the Rochers de Freÿr, in front of the Castle of Freÿr south of Dinant

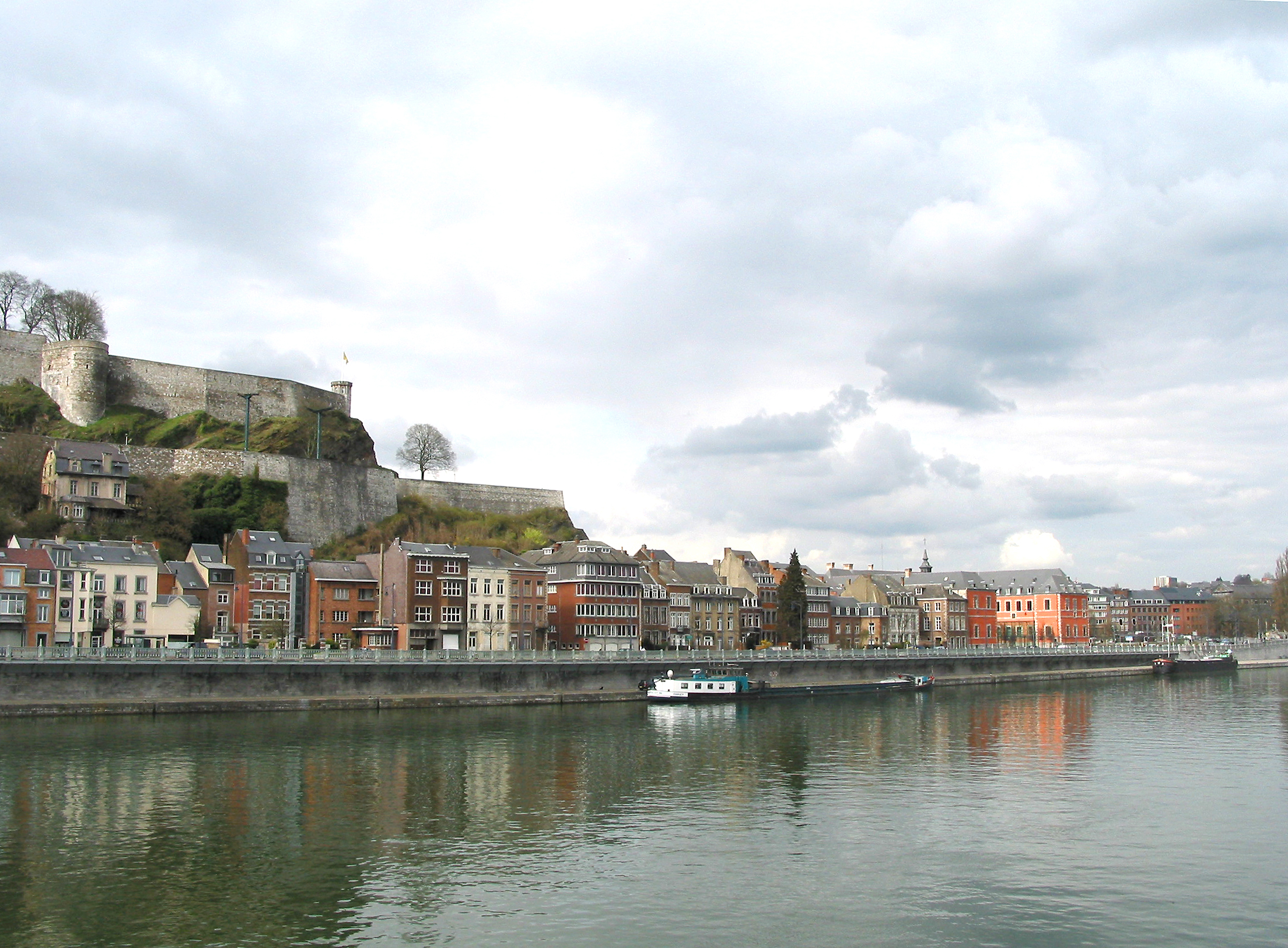
The Meuse at Namur, capital of Belgium's Wallonia

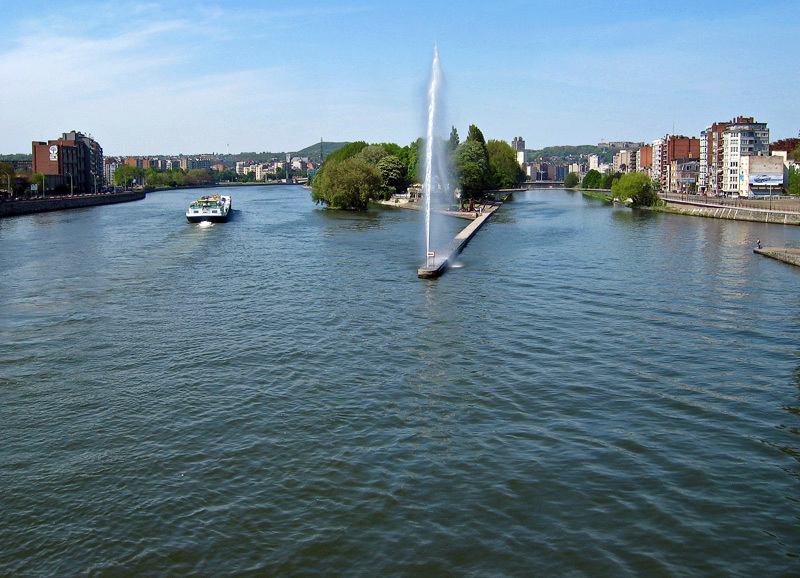
The Meuse at Liège, third river port of Europe

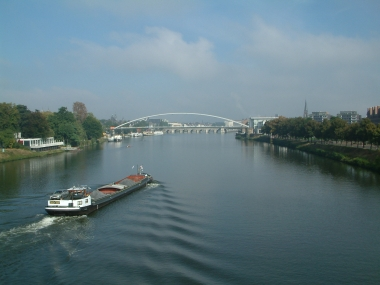
The Meuse (Maas) at Maastricht

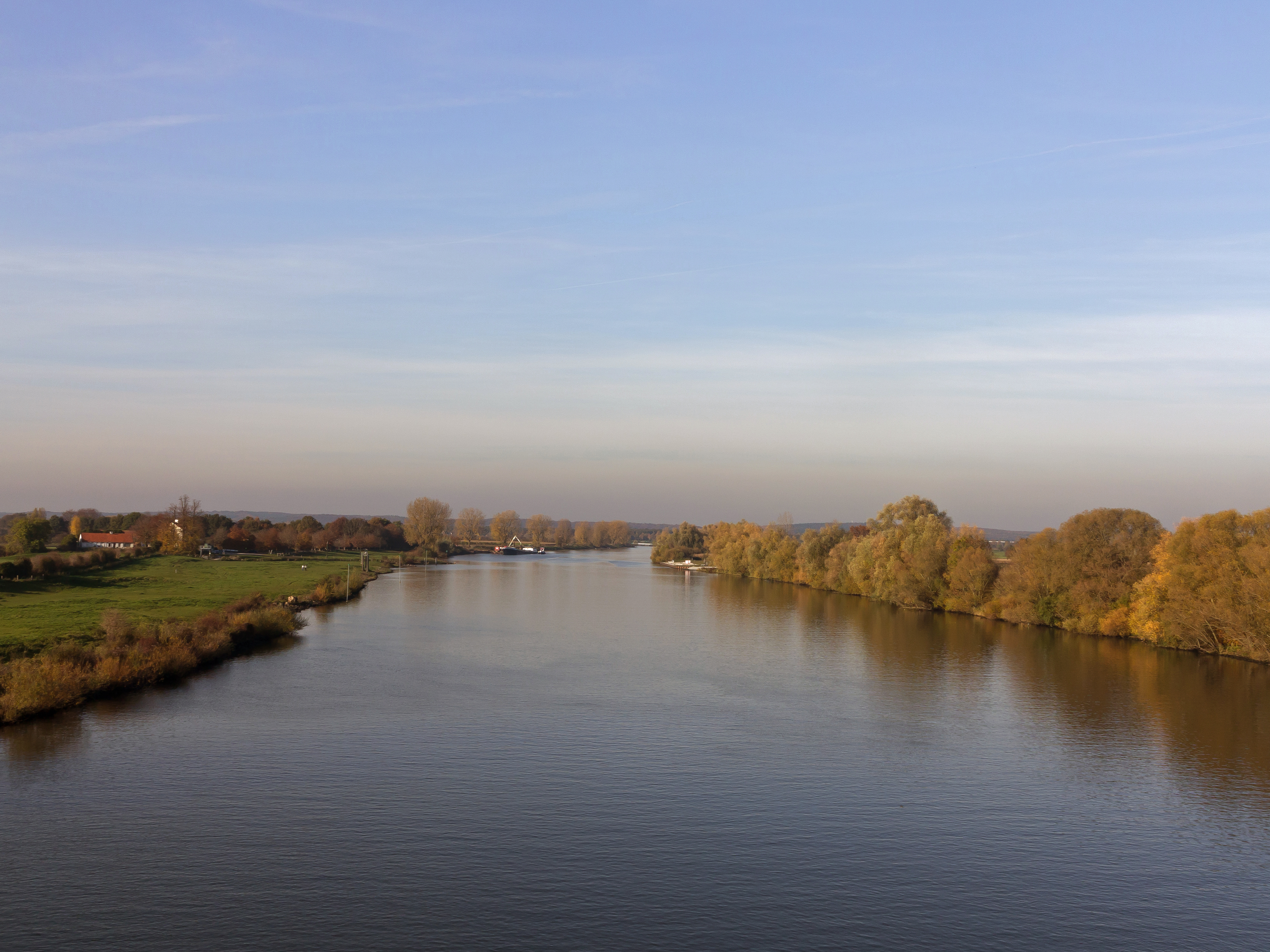
Meuse near Gennep

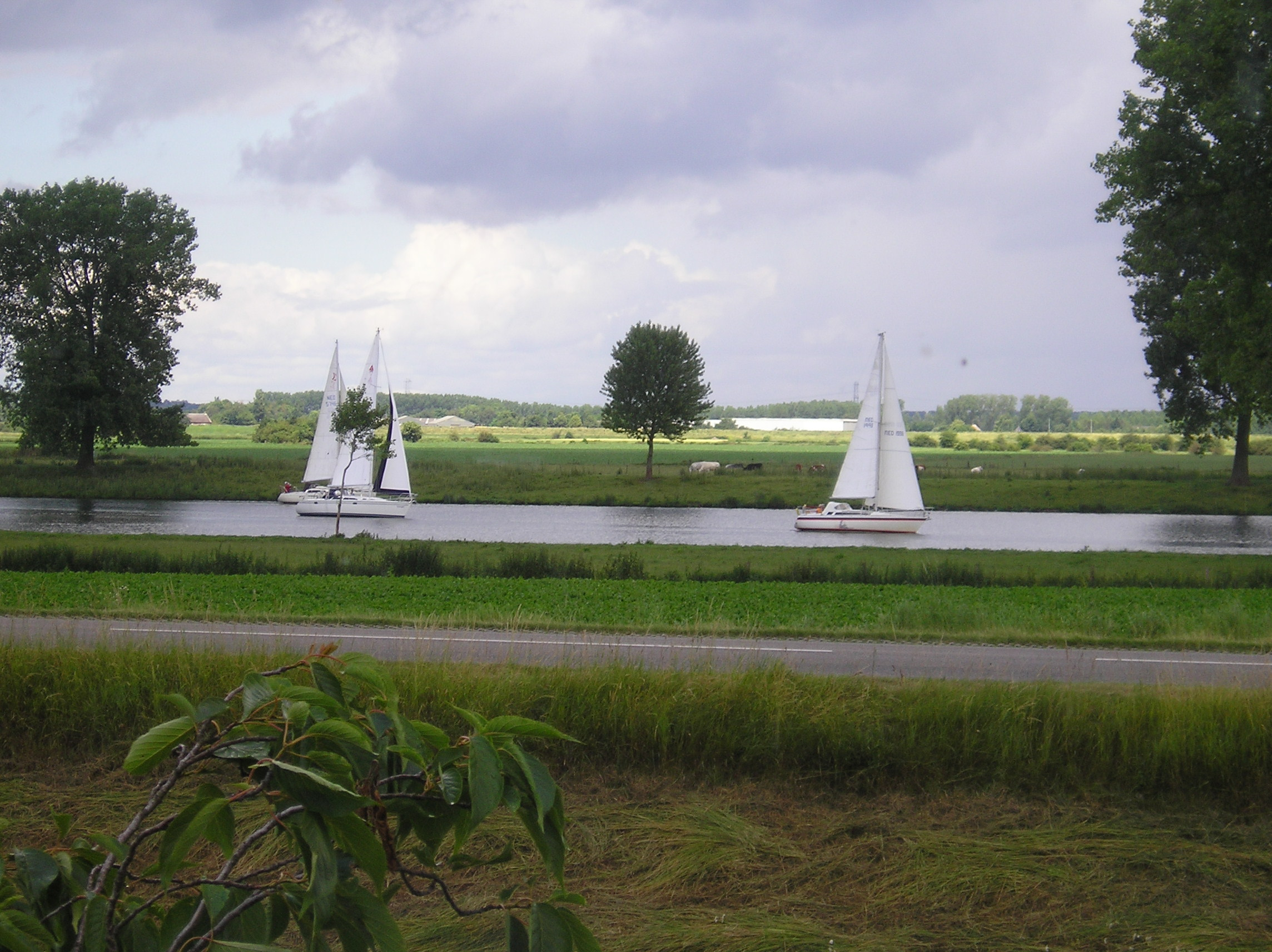
Meuse near Grave

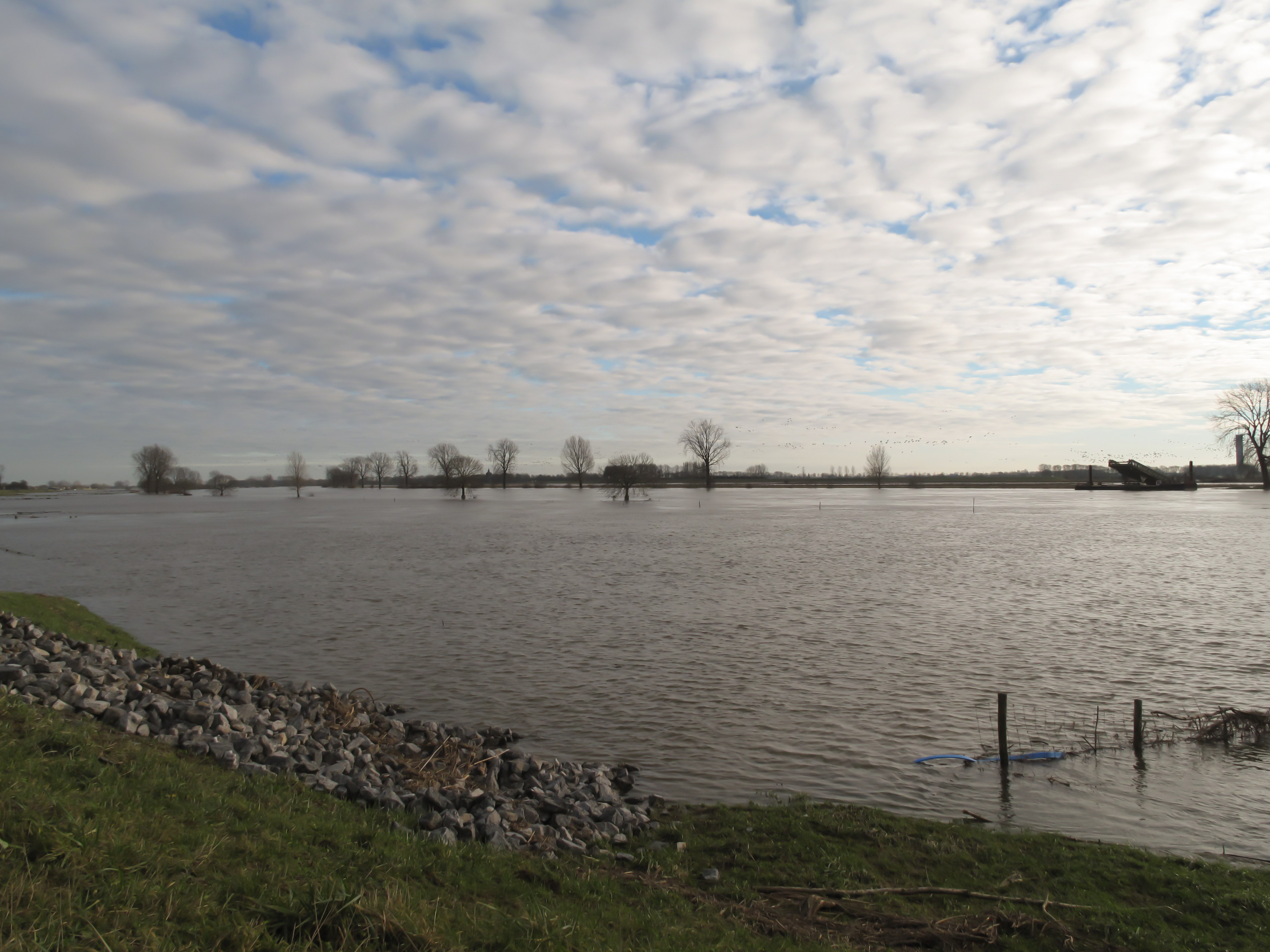
Meuse near Appeltern

An international agreement was signed in 2002 in Ghent, Belgium, about the management of the river amongst France, Germany, Luxembourg, the Netherlands, and Belgium. Also participating in the agreement were the Belgian regional governments of Flanders, Wallonia, and Brussels (which is not in the basin of the Meuse but pumps running water into the Meuse).

Most of the basin area (approximately 36,000 km^{2}) is in Wallonia (12,000 km^{2}), followed by France (9,000 km^{2}), the Netherlands (8,000 km^{2}), Germany (2,000 km^{2}), Flanders (2,000 km^{2}) and Luxembourg (a few km^{2}).

An International Commission on the Meuse has the responsibility of the implementation of the treaty.

The costs of this Commission are met by all these countries, in proportion of their own territory in the basin of the Meuse: Netherlands 30%, Wallonia 30%, France 15%, Germany 14.5%, Flanders 5%, Brussels 4.5%, Kingdom of Belgium 0.5%, and Luxembourg 0.5%.

The map of the basin area of Meuse was joined to the text of the treaty.

As for culture, as a major communication route the River Meuse is the origin of Mosan art, principally (Wallonia and France).

The first landscape painted in the Renaissance was the landscape of Meuse by Joachim Patinir. He was likely the uncle of Henri Blès, who is sometimes defined as a Mosan landscape painter active during the second third of the 16th century (i.e. second generation of landscape painters).

=== Tributaries ===
The main tributaries of the Meuse are listed below in downstream-upstream order, with the town where the tributary meets the river:

- Dieze (near 's-Hertogenbosch)
  - Aa (in 's-Hertogenbosch)
  - Binnendieze (in 's-Hertogenbosch)
  - Dommel (in 's-Hertogenbosch)
    - Gender (in Eindhoven)
- Raam (in Grave)
- Niers (in Gennep)
- Swalm (in Swalmen)
- Rur/Roer (in Roermond)
  - Wurm (in Heinsberg, Germany)
  - Merzbach (in Linnich, Germany)
  - Inde (in Jülich, Germany)
- Kingbeek (near Illikhoven)
- Geleenbeek (near Maasbracht)
- Geul (near Meerssen)
- Geer/Jeker (in Maastricht)
  - Yerne (in Lens-sur-Geer)
- Voer/Fouron (in Eijsden)
- Berwinne/Berwijn (near Moelingen, part of Voeren)
- Ourthe (in Liège)
  - Weser/Vesdre (near Liège)
  - Amel/Amblève (in Comblain-au-Pont)
    - Salm (in Trois-Ponts)
    - Warche (near Malmedy)
- Hoyoux (in Huy)
- Mehaigne (in Wanze)
- Sambre (in Namur)
- Houyoux (in Namur)
- Bocq (in Yvoir)
- Molignée (in Anhée)
- Lesse (in Anseremme, part of Dinant)
- Viroin (in Vireux-Molhain)
- Faux (in Revin)
- Semois or Semoy (in Monthermé)
- Sormonne (in Warcq)
- Bar (near Dom-le-Mesnil)
- Chiers (in Bazeilles)
  - Othain (in Montmédy)
- Vair (in Maxey-sur-Meuse)
- Mouzon (in Neufchâteau, Vosges)
- Saônelle (in Coussey)

== Distributaries ==
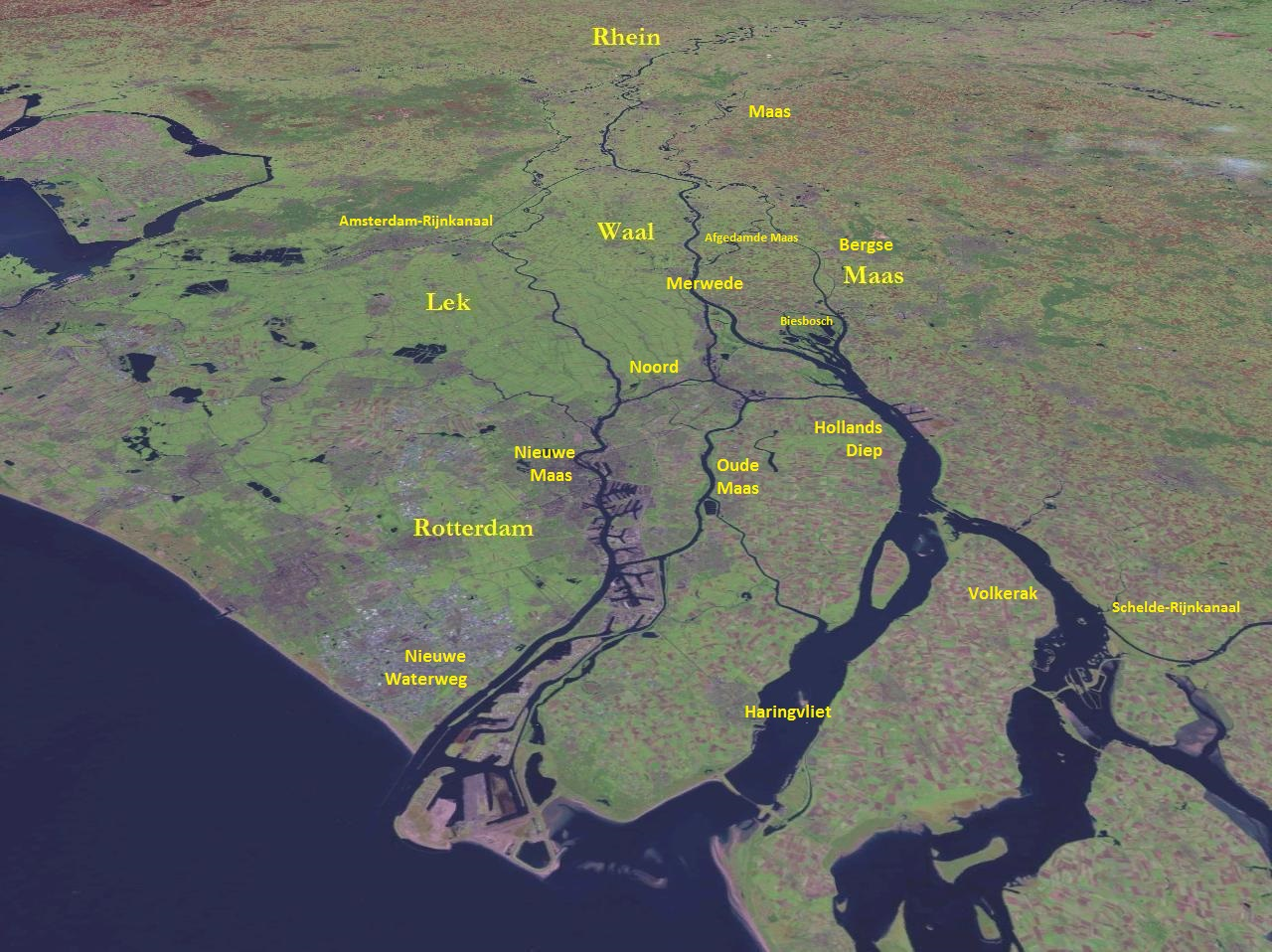
The lower part of the Rhine-Meuse Delta

The mean annual discharge rate of the Meuse has been relatively stable over the last few thousand years. One recent study estimates that average flow has increased by about 10% since 2000 BC. The hydrological distribution of the Meuse changed during the later Middle Ages, when a major flood forced it to shift its main course northwards towards the river Merwede. From then on several stretches of the original Merwede were renamed "Maas" (i.e. Meuse) and served as the primary outflow of that river. Those branches are currently known as the Nieuwe Maas and Oude Maas.

However during another series of severe floods the Meuse found an additional path towards the sea, resulting in the creation of the Biesbosch wetlands and Hollands Diep estuaries. Thereafter the Meuse split near Heusden into two main distributaries, one flowing north to join the Merwede and one flowing direct to the sea. The branch of the Meuse leading direct to the sea eventually silted up (and now forms the Oude Maasje stream), but in 1904 the canalised Bergse Maas was dug to take over the functions of the silted-up branch. At the same time the branch leading to the Merwede was dammed at Heusden (and has since been known as the Afgedamde Maas) so that little water from the Meuse entered the old Maas courses or the Rhine distributaries. The resulting separation of the rivers Rhine and Meuse is considered to be the greatest achievement in Dutch hydraulic engineering before the completion of the Zuiderzee Works and Delta Works. In 1970 the Haringvlietdam has been finished. Since then the reunited Rhine and Meuse waters have reached the North Sea either at this site or, during times of lower discharges of the Rhine, at Hook of Holland.

A 2008 study notes that the difference between summer and winter flow volumes has increased significantly in the last 100–200 years. It points out that the frequency of serious floods (i.e. flows > 1000% of normal) has increased markedly. They predict that winter flooding of the Meuse may become a recurring problem in the coming decades.

== Départements, provinces and towns ==
The Meuse flows through the following departments of France, provinces of Belgium, provinces of the Netherlands and towns:

- (France) Haute-Marne
- (France) Vosges: Neufchâteau
- (France) Meuse: Commercy, Saint-Mihiel, Verdun, Stenay
- (France) Ardennes: Sedan, Charleville-Mézières, Givet
- (Belgium) Namur: Dinant, Namur
- (Belgium) Liège: Huy, Liège, Visé
- (Netherlands) Limburg: Eijsden, Maastricht, Stein, Maasbracht, Roermond, Venlo, Gennep
- (Belgium) Limburg: Stokkem, Maaseik (between Stein and Maasbracht)
- (Netherlands) North Brabant: Boxmeer, Cuijk, Grave, Ravenstein, Lith, Heusden, Aalburg, Woudrichem
- (Netherlands) Gelderland: Maasdriel
- (Netherlands) South Holland: Dordrecht, Maassluis, Rotterdam

== Detailed route ==
Main cities and tributaries will be in bold.

Region	Municipality on the left bank	Municipality on the right bank	Route
(European Union) France Grand Est Region Haute-Marne Department	Le Châtelet-sur-Meuse	Le Châtelet-sur-Meuse	**Source near Pouilly-en-Bassigny** Le Châtelet-sur-Meuse Premier pont de la Meuse
(European Union) France Grand Est Region Haute-Marne Department	Dammartin-sur-Meuse	Dammartin-sur-Meuse	Malroy Pont de Malroy Pont du Pâtis des Vannees Ruisseau de Pré Chatenay
(European Union) France Grand Est Region Haute-Marne Department	Val-de-Meuse	Val-de-Meuse	Meuse Pont de Meuse (D429 Val-de-Meuse - Dombrot-le-Sec) Ruisseau d'Avrecourt Railway bridge Culmont-Chalindrey - Toul line Ru d'Ouette Ru des Fossés Ruisseau de Bocheret Provenchères-sur-Meuse Pont de Val-de-Meuse (D189) Ruisseau des Aimeguenons Pont de l'A31 (A31 Nancy - Dijon) Ruisseau de Joncourt Pont de D132 Ruisseau de l'Étange Ruisseau du Grand Étange
(European Union) France Grand Est Region Haute-Marne Department	Lavilleneuve	Val-de-Meuse	Ruisseau de Rangecourt Pont de Lavilleneuve (D132) Le Viau
(European Union) France Grand Est Region Haute-Marne Department	Val-de-Meuse	Val-de-Meuse	Lénizeul Pont de D228
(European Union) France Grand Est Region Haute-Marne Department	Bassoncourt	Bassoncourt	Ruisseau du Soilleron Pont de Bassin Court sur la Meuse (D33)
(European Union) France Grand Est Region Haute-Marne Department	Breuvannes-en-Bassigny	Breuvannes-en-Bassigny	Ruisseau des Noues Meuvy Pont de Meuvy (D220)
(European Union) France Grand Est Region Haute-Marne Department	Clefmont	Clefmont	/
(European Union) France Grand Est Region Haute-Marne Department	Audeloncourt	Audeloncourt	Ruisseau du Grand Pré
(European Union) France Grand Est Region Haute-Marne Department	Levécourt	Levécourt	Ruisseau de la Hourie Levécourt Pont de Levécourt (D131)
(European Union) France Grand Est Region Haute-Marne Department	Huilliécourt	Doncourt-sur-Meuse	/
(European Union) France Grand Est Region Haute-Marne Department	Hâcourt	Hâcourt	Pont de Hâcourt
(European Union) France Grand Est Region Haute-Marne Department	Bourg-Sainte-Marie	Hâcourt	Hâcourt Ruisseau de Piot
(European Union) France Grand Est Region Haute-Marne Department	Bourg-Sainte-Marie	Brainville-sur-Meuse	Pont de Bourg-Sainte-Marie (D119)
(European Union) France Grand Est Region Haute-Marne Department	Bourmont-entre-Meuse-et-Mouzon	Bourmont-entre-Meuse-et-Mouzon	Bourmont
(European Union) France Grand Est Region Haute-Marne Department	Saint-Thiébault	Bourmont-entre-Meuse-et-Mouzon	Saint-Thiébault Pont de Saint-Thiébault (D16) Ruisseau d'Illoud
(European Union) France Grand Est Region Haute-Marne Department	Bourmont-entre-Meuse-et-Mouzon	Bourmont-entre-Meuse-et-Mouzon	Pont de Gonaincourt (D119) Gonaincourt Le Mordé Pont de Bourmont sur la Meuse (D148) Goncourt
(European Union) France Grand Est Region Haute-Marne Department	Harréville-les-Chanteurs	Harréville-les-Chanteurs	Railway bridges Culmont-Chalindrey - Toul line (2x) Harréville-les-Chanteurs Pont de Harréville-les-Chanteurs (D202)
(European Union) (Vosges (department)) France Grand Est Region Vosges Department	Bazoilles-sur-Meuse	Bazoilles-sur-Meuse	Railway bridges Culmont-Chalindrey - Toul line (2x) Pont de Bazoilles-sur-Meuse (D74 Langres - Neufchâteau) Bazoilles-sur-Meuse
(European Union) (Vosges (department)) France Grand Est Region Vosges Department	Neufchâteau	Neufchâteau	Railway bridge Culmont-Chalindrey - Toul line **Neufchâteau** Pont de Neufchâteau (D674 Chaumont - Neufchâteau) **Mouzon** Railway bridge at Neufchâteau railway station Pont All. Charles Péguy
(European Union) (Vosges (department)) France Grand Est Region Vosges Department	Frebécourt	Frebécourt	Pont de Frebécourt Frebécourt La Saônelle
(European Union) (Vosges (department)) France Grand Est Region Vosges Department	Coussey	Coussey	Coussey Pont de Coussey (D3)
(European Union) (Vosges (department)) France Grand Est Region Vosges Department	Domrémy-la-Pucelle	Domrémy-la-Pucelle	Pont de Domrémy-la-Pucelle (D164 Neufchâteau - Greux) Domrémy-la-Pucelle
(European Union) (Vosges (department)) France Grand Est Region Vosges Department	Greux	Maxey-sur-Meuse	**Vair**
(European Union) (Vosges (department)) France Grand Est Region Vosges Department	Maxey-sur-Meuse	Maxey-sur-Meuse	Maxey-sur-Meuse Pont de D19
(European Union) (Meuse (department)) France Grand Est Region Meuse Department	Brixey-aux-Chanoines	Brixey-aux-Chanoines	Pont de Brixey-aux-Chanoines
(European Union) (Meuse (department)) France Grand Est Region Meuse Department	Sauvigny	Sauvigny	Ruisseau de Ruppes Sauvigny Pont de Sauvigny
(European Union) (Meuse (department)) France Grand Est Region Meuse Department	Montbras	Sauvigny	/
(European Union) (Meuse (department)) France Grand Est Region Meuse Department	Sauvigny	Sauvigny	Pont de Traveron Traveron
(European Union) (Meuse (department)) France Grand Est Region Meuse Department	Pagny-la-Blanche-Côte	Pagny-la-Blanche-Côte	Rivière de Chêtre Pont de Pagny-la-Blanche-Côte (D32) Rivière de Chêtre
(European Union) (Meuse (department)) France Grand Est Region Meuse Department	Montbras	Champougny	/
(European Union) (Meuse (department)) France Grand Est Region Meuse Department	Taillancourt	Champougny	La Haute Meuse
(European Union) (Meuse (department)) France Grand Est Region Meuse Department	Champougny	Champougny	Champougny Pont de Champougny
(European Union) (Meuse (department)) France Grand Est Region Meuse Department	Maxey-sur-Vaise	Maxey-sur-Vaise	/
(European Union) (Meuse (department)) France Grand Est Region Meuse Department	Burey-en-Vaux	Sepvigny	/
(European Union) (Meuse (department)) France Grand Est Region Meuse Department	Sepvigny	Sepvigny	Pont de Sepvigny (D145)
(European Union) (Meuse (department)) France Grand Est Region Meuse Department	Neuville-lès-Vaucouleurs	Neuville-lès-Vaucouleurs	/
(European Union) (Meuse (department)) France Grand Est Region Meuse Department	Vaucouleurs	Chalaines	Chalaines Pont de Chalaines (D960 Toul - Bure) La Haute Meuse
(European Union) (Meuse (department)) France Grand Est Region Meuse Department	Ugny-sur-Meuse	Rigny-la-Salle	Le Goulot de Meuse Ugny-sur-Meuse
(European Union) (Meuse (department)) France Grand Est Region Meuse Department	Ugny-sur-Meuse	Saint-Germain-sur-Meuse	Pont de Ugny-sur-Meuse (D36) Saint-Germain-sur-Meuse Pont de Saint-Germain-sur-Meuse (D144A)
(European Union) (Meuse (department)) France Grand Est Region Meuse Department	Ugny-sur-Meuse	Ourches-sur-Meuse	Ourches-sur-Meuse Pont de D144
(European Union) (Meuse (department)) France Grand Est Region Meuse Department	Pagny-sur-Meuse	Pagny-sur-Meuse	Pont de Pagny-sur-Meuse (N4 Paris - Strasbourg) Pagny-sur-Meuse Pont de D36
(European Union) (Meuse (department)) France Grand Est Region Meuse Department	Troussey	Troussey	Troussey Pont de D36C Marne–Rhine Canal Pont de Troussey (D36)
(European Union) (Meuse (department)) France Grand Est Region Meuse Department	Void-Vacon	Sorcy-Saint-Martin	Ruisseau de Frasne Le Vidus
(European Union) (Meuse (department)) France Grand Est Region Meuse Department	Sorcy-Saint-Martin	Sorcy-Saint-Martin	Pont de Sorcy-Saint-Martin (D10) Sorcy-Saint-Martin Pont de D144
(European Union) (Meuse (department)) France Grand Est Region Meuse Department	Sorcy-Saint-Martin	Euville	Railway bridge Paris-Est–Strasbourg-Ville line Issey Pont d'Euville (D144) Canal de l'Est
(European Union) (Meuse (department)) France Grand Est Region Meuse Department	Commercy	Commercy	Canal de l'Est Pont de D36 Ruisseau de la Noue
(European Union) (Meuse (department)) France Grand Est Region Meuse Department	Vignot	Vignot	Ruisseau d'Aulnois Pont de Vignot (D958 Commercy - Pont-à-Mousson) Vignot
(European Union) (Meuse (department)) France Grand Est Region Meuse Department	Commercy	Commercy	Pont de Rte de Boncourt (D8A) Canal de l'Est
(European Union) (Meuse (department)) France Grand Est Region Meuse Department	Lérouville	Commercy	Canal de l'Est
(European Union) (Meuse (department)) France Grand Est Region Meuse Department	Boncourt-sur-Meuse	Boncourt-sur-Meuse	Railway bridge Lérouville - Metz line Pont de Boncourt-sur-Meuse
(European Union) (Meuse (department)) France Grand Est Region Meuse Department	Pont-sur-Meuse	Pont-sur-Meuse	Pont-sur-Meuse Pont de Pont-sur-Meuse (D12) Ruisseau de Chonville
(European Union) (Meuse (department)) France Grand Est Region Meuse Department	Vadonville	Pont-sur-Meuse	/
(European Union) (Meuse (department)) France Grand Est Region Meuse Department	Mécrin	Mécrin	Pont de Mécrin (D12A) Mécrin
(European Union) (Meuse (department)) France Grand Est Region Meuse Department	Sampigny	Han-sur-Meuse	Rivière de Mont
(European Union) (Meuse (department)) France Grand Est Region Meuse Department	Han-sur-Meuse	Han-sur-Meuse	Brasseitte Pont du Moulin Blussot (D183) Ally-sur-Meuse Han-sur-Meuse
(European Union) (Meuse (department)) France Grand Est Region Meuse Department	Han-sur-Meuse	Saint-Mihiel	Pont de Han-sur-Meuse (D7A)
(European Union) (Meuse (department)) France Grand Est Region Meuse Department	Kœur-la-Petite	Bislée	Pont de D964 (Commercy - Verdun) Canal de l'Est
(European Union) (Meuse (department)) France Grand Est Region Meuse Department	Kœur-la-Grande	Bislée	Pont de Bislée (D171) Bislée
(European Union) (Meuse (department)) France Grand Est Region Meuse Department	Chauvoncourt	Bislée	Canal de l'Est
(European Union) (Meuse (department)) France Grand Est Region Meuse Department	Chauvoncourt	Chauvoncourt	Menonville
(European Union) (Meuse (department)) France Grand Est Region Meuse Department	Saint-Mihiel	Saint-Mihiel	Canal de l'Est Saint-Mihiel Pont de Saint-Mihiel (D901 Saint-Mihiel - Rumont)
(European Union) (Meuse (department)) France Grand Est Region Meuse Department	Les Paroches	Maizey	Le Rehaut Canal de l'Est
(European Union) (Meuse (department)) France Grand Est Region Meuse Department	Maizey	Maizey	Maizy
(European Union) (Meuse (department)) France Grand Est Region Meuse Department	Dompcevrin	Maizey	Pont de Maizy (D101) Dompcevrin Le Hamboquin
(European Union) (Meuse (department)) France Grand Est Region Meuse Department	Bannoncourt	Rouvrois-sur-Meuse	/
(European Union) (Meuse (department)) France Grand Est Region Meuse Department	Bannoncourt	Bannoncourt	La Petite Meuse Pont de Bannoncourt (D109) Bannoncourt Railway bridge LGV Est high speed line (Paris - Strasbourg) Ruisseau de Rompierre
(European Union) (Meuse (department)) France Grand Est Region Meuse Department	Bannoncourt	Lacroix-sur-Meuse	La Prêle
(European Union) (Meuse (department)) France Grand Est Region Meuse Department	Woimbey	Lacroix-sur-Meuse	/
(European Union) (Meuse (department)) France Grand Est Region Meuse Department	Troyon	Troyon	Pont de Troyon Troyon
(European Union) (Meuse (department)) France Grand Est Region Meuse Department	Bouquemont	Troyon	/
(European Union) (Meuse (department)) France Grand Est Region Meuse Department	Tilly-sur-Meuse	Troyon	/
(European Union) (Meuse (department)) France Grand Est Region Meuse Department	Tilly-sur-Meuse	Tilly-sur-Meuse	Pont de Tilly-sur-Meuse Tilly-sur-Meuse
(European Union) (Meuse (department)) France Grand Est Region Meuse Department	Tilly-sur-Meuse	Ambly-sur-Meuse	Ruisseau de Récourt
(European Union) (Meuse (department)) France Grand Est Region Meuse Department	Villers-sur-Meuse	Villers-sur-Meuse	Villers-sur-Meuse Pont de Villers-sur-Meuse (D21)
(European Union) (Meuse (department)) France Grand Est Region Meuse Department	Les Monthairons	Les Monthairons	Pont de Rue du Lavoir Les Monthairons Le Petit Monthairon
(European Union) (Meuse (department)) France Grand Est Region Meuse Department	Dieue-sur-Meuse	Dieue-sur-Meuse	Le Clair Fossé Ruisseau de la Dieue La Petite Meuse Pont de Dieue-sur-Meuse (D159) Dieue-sur-Meuse Ruisseau de Billonneau Ruisseau de la Dieue
(European Union) (Meuse (department)) France Grand Est Region Meuse Department	Dugny-sur-Meuse	Haudainville	Pont de l'Autoroute A4 (Paris - Strasbourg) Ruisseau du Franc Ban
(European Union) (Meuse (department)) France Grand Est Region Meuse Department	Belleray	Belleray	Pont de Belleray (D301) Belleray Canal de l'Est
(European Union) (Meuse (department)) France Grand Est Region Meuse Department	Verdun	Verdun	Saint Vanne Pont de D330 Pont de Rued'Anthouard **Verdun** Saint Vanne Pont Fernand Legay Canal du Puty Pont Chaussée Pont de D603 (Verdun - Metz)
(European Union) (Meuse (department)) France Grand Est Region Meuse Department	Belleville-sur-Meuse	Thierville-sur-Meuse	Railway bridge St-Hilaire-au-Temple-Hagondange line (Verdun-Metz) Canal de l'Est La Scance Pont de D302B
(European Union) (Meuse (department)) France Grand Est Region Meuse Department	Charny-sur-Meuse	Bras-sur-Meuse	Charny-sur-Meuse Pont de Bras-sur-Meuse (D115)
(European Union) (Meuse (department)) France Grand Est Region Meuse Department	Vacherauville	Vacherauville	Vacherauville
(European Union) (Meuse (department)) France Grand Est Region Meuse Department	Marre	Champneuville	Ruisseau de la Claire
(European Union) (Meuse (department)) France Grand Est Region Meuse Department	Chattancourt	Champneuville	/
(European Union) (Meuse (department)) France Grand Est Region Meuse Department	Champneuville	Champneuville	Pont de Champneuville (D214)
(European Union) (Meuse (department)) France Grand Est Region Meuse Department	Cumières-le-Mort-Homme	Champneuville	/
(European Union) (Meuse (department)) France Grand Est Region Meuse Department	Regnéville-sur-Meuse	Samogneux	Regnéville-sur-Meuse Pont de Samogneux Samogneux
(European Union) (Meuse (department)) France Grand Est Region Meuse Department	Forges-sur-Meuse	Brabant-sur-Meuse	Ruisseau de Forges
(European Union) (Meuse (department)) France Grand Est Region Meuse Department	Consenvoye	Consenvoye	Pont de Consenvoye Consenvoye
(European Union) (Meuse (department)) France Grand Est Region Meuse Department	Dannevoux	Sivry-sur-Meuse	Canal de l'Est Ruisseau de Guénoville Le Butel Pont de Dannevoux Ruisseau de Brouzel
(European Union) (Meuse (department)) France Grand Est Region Meuse Department	Vilosnes-Haraumont	Vilosnes-Haraumont	Canal de l'Est Canal de l'Est Vilosnes-Haraumont Pont de Vilosnes-Haraumont (D123B)
(European Union) (Meuse (department)) France Grand Est Region Meuse Department	Brieulles-sur-Meuse	Brieulles-sur-Meuse	Ruisseau de Domfontaine Brieulles-sur-Meuse Le Wassieu
(European Union) (Meuse (department)) France Grand Est Region Meuse Department	Cléry-le-Petit	Liny-devant-Dun	Le Doua La Tranchée
(European Union) (Meuse (department)) France Grand Est Region Meuse Department	Cléry-le-Petit	Dun-sur-Meuse	Canal de l'Est
(European Union) (Meuse (department)) France Grand Est Region Meuse Department	Doulcon	Dun-sur-Meuse	Dun-sur-Meuse Pont de Dun-sur-Meuse (D998) Doulcon L'Andon
(European Union) (Meuse (department)) France Grand Est Region Meuse Department	Sassey-sur-Meuse	Milly-sur-Bradon	Ruisseau de Bradon Canal de l'Est
(European Union) (Meuse (department)) France Grand Est Region Meuse Department	Sassey-sur-Meuse	Sassey-sur-Meuse	Sassey-sur-Meuse Pont de Sassey-sur-Meuse (D30) Ruisseau des Gaules
(European Union) (Meuse (department)) France Grand Est Region Meuse Department	Mont-devant-Sassey	Sassey-sur-Meuse	Ruisseau de Mont Ruisseau de Longvaux
(European Union) (Meuse (department)) France Grand Est Region Meuse Department	Saulmory-Villefranche	Mouzay	Ruisseau de Froide Fontaine Le Grand Mohat Le Petit Mohat
(European Union) (Meuse (department)) France Grand Est Region Meuse Department	Wiseppe	Mouzay	/
(European Union) (Meuse (department)) France Grand Est Region Meuse Department	Stenay	Mouzay	Canal de l'Est
(European Union) (Meuse (department)) France Grand Est Region Meuse Department	Stenay	Stenay	Pont de Stenay (D947 Stenay - Montmédy) Stenay Canal de l'Est La Wiseppe Ruisseau de Cervizy
(European Union) (Meuse (department)) France Grand Est Region Meuse Department	Martincourt-sur-Meuse	Martincourt-sur-Meuse	Pont de Martincourt-sur-Meuse Martincourt-sur-Meuse
(European Union) (Meuse (department)) France Grand Est Region Meuse Department	Luzy-Saint-Martin	Inor	Ruisseau de Cesse Pont de Luz Inor Canal de l'Est
(European Union) (Meuse (department)) France Grand Est Region Meuse Department	Pouilly-sur-Meuse	Inor	Ruisseau du Fond de Noue
(European Union) (Meuse (department)) France Grand Est Region Meuse Department	Pouilly-sur-Meuse	Pouilly-sur-Meuse	Pont de Pouilly-sur-Meuse Pouilly-sur-Meuse
(European Union) (Ardennes (department)) / (Meuse (department)) France Grand Est Region Ardennes Department / Meuse Department	Létanne (Ardennes (department))	Pouilly-sur-Meuse (Meuse (department))	La Wame Létanne
(European Union) (Ardennes (department)) France Grand Est Region Ardennes Department	Létanne	Mouzon	Le Bras de Vincy Canal de l'Est Canal de l'Est
(European Union) (Ardennes (department)) France Grand Est Region Ardennes Department	Mouzon	Mouzon	Mouzon Pont de D19
(European Union) (Ardennes (department)) France Grand Est Region Ardennes Department	Autrecourt-et-Pourron	Mouzon	Yoncq Autrecourt Ruisseau de Brouhan
(European Union) (Ardennes (department)) France Grand Est Region Ardennes Department	Villers-devant-Mouzon	Mouzon	Villers-devant-Mouzon Ruisseau de la Vignette Ruisseau des Trois Fontaines Coupure de Remilly
(European Union) (Ardennes (department)) France Grand Est Region Ardennes Department	Remilly-Aillicourt	Douzy	/
(European Union) (Ardennes (department)) France Grand Est Region Ardennes Department	Remilly-Aillicourt	Remilly-Aillicourt	Petit Remilly Pont de Remilly-Aillicourt (D4) Remilly
(European Union) (Ardennes (department)) France Grand Est Region Ardennes Department	Remilly-Aillicourt	Bazeilles	**Chiers** Aillicourt Pont de Bazeilles (D129) Coupure de Remilly
(European Union) (Ardennes (department)) France Grand Est Region Ardennes Department	Noyers-Pont-Maugis	Bazeilles	Ruisseau de Thélonne Railway bridge Mohon-Thionville line (Sedan - Thionville) Pont-Maugis
(European Union) (Ardennes (department)) France Grand Est Region Ardennes Department	Noyers-Pont-Maugis	Balan	Ruisseau de Batelotte
(European Union) (Ardennes (department)) France Grand Est Region Ardennes Department	Wadelincourt	Balan	Wadelincourt
(European Union) (Ardennes (department)) France Grand Est Region Ardennes Department	Wadelincourt	Sedan	Pont de Sedan (N43 Sedan - Charleville-Mézières)
(European Union) (Ardennes (department)) France Grand Est Region Ardennes Department	Sedan	Sedan	Pont de l'Avenue Philippoteaux (D8043A) Canal de l'Est Pont du Boulevard Fabert **Sedan** Pont de Meuse Passerelle Saint-Vincent de Paul Canal de l'Est Pont-Neuf de Sedan
(European Union) (Ardennes (department)) France Grand Est Region Ardennes Department	Glaire	Floing	Ruz de Glaire Floing Glaire Tour à Glaire (Glaire) Ruisseau de Floing Igles (Glaire)
(European Union) (Ardennes (department)) France Grand Est Region Ardennes Department	Glaire	Saint-Menges	Ruisseau du Bas Caillou Saint-Menges
(European Union) (Ardennes (department)) France Grand Est Region Ardennes Department	Glaire	Donchery	Ruisseau de la Falizette Villette (Glaire) Pont de Glaire (A34 Sedan - Charleville-Mézières) Railway bridge Mohon-Thionville line (Charleville-Mézières - Sedan)
(European Union) (Ardennes (department)) France Grand Est Region Ardennes Department	Sedan	Donchery	Frénois (Sedan)
(European Union) (Ardennes (department)) France Grand Est Region Ardennes Department	Donchery	Donchery	Pont de Donchery (D24) Donchery
(European Union) (Ardennes (department)) France Grand Est Region Ardennes Department	Villers-sur-Bar	Donchery	Vrigne
(European Union) (Ardennes (department)) France Grand Est Region Ardennes Department	Villers-sur-Bar	Vrigne-Meuse	Vrigne-Meuse **Bar**
(European Union) (Ardennes (department)) France Grand Est Region Ardennes Department	Dom-le-Mesnil	Vrigne-Meuse	**Canal des Ardennes**
(European Union) (Ardennes (department)) France Grand Est Region Ardennes Department	Dom-le-Mesnil	Nouvion-sur-Meuse	Nouvion-sur-Meuse Pont de Nouvion-sur-Meuse (D33)
(European Union) (Ardennes (department)) France Grand Est Region Ardennes Department	Flize	Nouvion-sur-Meuse	Ruisseau des Trois Fontaines Flize Ruisseau de Boutancourt
(European Union) (Ardennes (department)) France Grand Est Region Ardennes Department	Chalandry-Elaire	Nouvion-sur-Meuse	Elaire (Chalandry-Elaire)
(European Union) (Ardennes (department)) France Grand Est Region Ardennes Department	Les Ayvelles	Lumes	Lumes
(European Union) (Ardennes (department)) France Grand Est Region Ardennes Department	Lumes	Lumes	Railway bridge Mohon-Thionville line (Charleville-Mézières - Sedan)
(European Union) (Ardennes (department)) France Grand Est Region Ardennes Department	Villers-Semeuse	Lumes	Pont de Lumes (A34 Sedan - Charleville-Mézières) Ruisseau de la Truie Dérivation de Romery
(European Union) (Ardennes (department)) France Grand Est Region Ardennes Department	Villers-Semeuse	Saint-Laurent	Dérivation de Romery
(European Union) (Ardennes (department)) France Grand Est Region Ardennes Department	Villers-Semeuse	Charleville-Mézières	Le Theux (Charleville-Mézières)
(European Union) (Ardennes (department)) France Grand Est Region Ardennes Department	Charleville-Mézières	Charleville-Mézières	Vence Railway bridge Soissons - Givet line (Charleville-Mézières - Reims) Mohon (Charleville-Mézières) Canal de l'Est Pont de la Victoire (D8043A) Mézières (Charleville-Mézières) Pont de Pierre Saint-Julien (Charleville-Mézières)
(European Union) (Ardennes (department)) France Grand Est Region Ardennes Department	Prix-lès-Mézières	Charleville-Mézières	Pont de Manchester (N43 Charleville-Mézières - Sedan) Ruisseau du Marbay Manchester (Charleville-Mézières) Prix-lès-Mézières Ruisseau des Rejets Ruisseau de Praëlle
(European Union) (Ardennes (department)) France Grand Est Region Ardennes Department	Warcq	Charleville-Mézières	Warcq Pont de Warcq (D16) **Sormonne**
(European Union) (Ardennes (department)) France Grand Est Region Ardennes Department	Charleville-Mézières	Charleville-Mézières	Pont de N43 (Charleville-Mézières - Sedan) Passerelle Bayard Pont d'Arches (D8043A) Canal de l'Est Railway bridge Soissons - Givet line (Charleville-Mézières - Reims) Railway bridge Soissons - Givet line (Charleville-Mézières - Givet) Canal de l'Est **Charleville-Mézières** Pont de Mocy (D58) Montcy-Saint-Pierre (Charleville-Mézières) Passerelle du Mont Olympe
(European Union) (Ardennes (department)) France Grand Est Region Ardennes Department	Montcy-Notre-Dame	Charleville-Mézières	Ruisseau de la Fontaine du Prince Ruisseau de Soiru Montcy-Notre-Dame Pont de Montcy-Notre-Dame (D58A) Canal de l'Est
(European Union) (Ardennes (department)) France Grand Est Region Ardennes Department	Montcy-Notre-Dame	Aiglemont	/
(European Union) (Ardennes (department)) France Grand Est Region Ardennes Department	Montcy-Notre-Dame	Nouzonville	/
(European Union) (Ardennes (department)) France Grand Est Region Ardennes Department	Nouzonville	Nouzonville	Nouzonville La Goutelle Ruisseau du Pré Allard Pont de Nouzonville (D13)
(European Union) (Ardennes (department)) France Grand Est Region Ardennes Department	Joigny-sur-Meuse	Joigny-sur-Meuse	Pont de Joigny-sur-Meuse (D1A) Joigny-sur-Meuse
(European Union) (Ardennes (department)) France Grand Est Region Ardennes Department	Bogny-sur-Meuse	Bogny-sur-Meuse	Braux Pont Jean-Rogissart (D1) Levrézy Bogny-sur-Meuse Pont Rue Jourde (D1C) Château Regnault
(European Union) (Ardennes (department)) France Grand Est Region Ardennes Department	Monthermé	Bogny-sur-Meuse	Railway bridge Soissons - Givet line (Charleville-Mézières - Givet)
(European Union) (Ardennes (department)) France Grand Est Region Ardennes Department	Monthermé	Monthermé	**Semois** Monthermé Pont de Monthermé (D989)
(European Union) (Ardennes (department)) France Grand Est Region Ardennes Department	Deville	Monthermé	Deville Ruisseau de Mairupt
(European Union) (Ardennes (department)) France Grand Est Region Ardennes Department	Laifour	Monthermé	Ruisseau de la Lambrèque
(European Union) (Ardennes (department)) France Grand Est Region Ardennes Department	Laifour	Revin	Ruisseau de la Grande Commune Ruisseau de la Petite Commune Laifour Railway bridge Soissons - Givet line (Charleville-Mézières - Givet) Pont de Laifour (D1)
(European Union) (Ardennes (department)) France Grand Est Region Ardennes Department	Les Mazures	Revin	/
(European Union) (Ardennes (department)) France Grand Est Region Ardennes Department	Anchamps	Revin	Railway bridge Soissons - Givet line (Charleville-Mézières - Givet) Anchamps Pont d'Anchamps (D1B) Ru de la Pille Ruisseau des Meurtriers
(European Union) (Ardennes (department)) France Grand Est Region Ardennes Department	Revin	Revin	Orzy Pont d'Orzy Railway bridge Soissons - Givet line (Charleville-Mézières - Givet) Revin Pont de la Bouverie (D988 Charleville-Mézières - Givet) Sartnizon
(European Union) (Ardennes (department)) France Grand Est Region Ardennes Department	Rocroi	Revin	Pont de Saint-Nicolas Saint-Nicolas (Rocroi) Faux Ruisseau de Falières
(European Union) (Ardennes (department)) France Grand Est Region Ardennes Department	Revin	Revin	Pont de Fumay (D988 Charleville-Mézières - Givet) Ruisseau des Cochons
(European Union) (Ardennes (department)) France Grand Est Region Ardennes Department	Fumay	Revin	Ruisseau de Come
(European Union) (Ardennes (department)) France Grand Est Region Ardennes Department	Fumay	Fumay	Ruisseau des Manises Railway bridge Soissons - Givet line (Charleville-Mézières - Givet) Ruisseau de la Folie
(European Union) (Ardennes (department)) France Grand Est Region Ardennes Department	Fumay	Haybes	Fumay Pont de Fumay (D7) Ri d'Alyse
(European Union) (Ardennes (department)) France Grand Est Region Ardennes Department	Haybes	Haybes	Pont de la Guerre (D7B) Haybes Ruisseau de Mohron
(European Union) (Ardennes (department)) France Grand Est Region Ardennes Department	Fépin	Haybes	Ruisseau d'Hargnies Fépin
(European Union) (Ardennes (department)) France Grand Est Region Ardennes Department	Montigny-sur-Meuse	Vireux-Wallerand	Risdoux Fond de la Mènerie Montigny-sur-Meuse
(European Union) (Ardennes (department)) France Grand Est Region Ardennes Department	Vireux-Molhain	Vireux-Wallerand	Vireux-Molhain Vireux-Wallerand Pont de Vireux (D989)
(European Union) (Ardennes (department)) France Grand Est Region Ardennes Department	Hierges	Vireux-Wallerand	Viroin
(European Union) (Ardennes (department)) France Grand Est Region Ardennes Department	Aubrives	Aubrives	Aubrives
(European Union) (Ardennes (department)) France Grand Est Region Ardennes Department	Aubrives	Ham-sur-Meuse	Ham-sur-Meuse Pont de Ham (D46DB)
(European Union) (Ardennes (department)) France Grand Est Region Ardennes Department	Chooz	Ham-sur-Meuse	Chooz Nuclear Power Plant
(European Union) (Ardennes (department)) France Grand Est Region Ardennes Department	Chooz	Chooz	Pont de Chemin de Mission Chooz Pont de Chooz
(European Union) (Ardennes (department)) France Grand Est Region Ardennes Department	Chooz	Rancennes	Le Fond des Vaux Les Trois Fontaines (Chooz)
(European Union) (Ardennes (department)) France Grand Est Region Ardennes Department	Givet	Rancennes	/
(European Union) (Ardennes (department)) France Grand Est Region Ardennes Department	Givet	Givet	Ruisseau de Rancennes Givet Pont des Américains (D949) Houille
(European Union) / / (Ardennes (department)) / France / Belgium Grand Est Region / Wallonia Region Ardennes Department / Namur Province	Givet (France)	Hastière (Belgium)	Ruisseau de Mon Idée Heer (Hastière)
(European Union) Belgium Wallonia Region Namur Province	Hastière	Hastière	Heer-Agimont Pont de N909 Hermeton-sur-Meuse Hermeton Ruisseau de Féron Hastière-Lavaux Hastière-par-delà Pont de Hastière-Lavaux (N915) Fond des Vaux Ruisseau de Bonsoy Ruisseau de la Roule Waulsort Ruisseau du Chestia
(European Union) Belgium Wallonia Region Namur Province	Hastière	Dinant	Freÿr (Hastière) Moniat (Hastière)
(European Union) Belgium Wallonia Region Namur Province	Dinant	Dinant	Anseremme Noyon Pré Railway bridge line 166 Libramont - Bertrix - Dinant **Lesse** Viaduc Charlemagne (N97 Ciney - Philippeville) Neffe Saint-Paul **Dinant** Pont Charles de Gaulle (N936) Leffe Ruisseau de Leffe Bouvignes-sur-Meuse
(European Union) Belgium Wallonia Region Namur Province	Dinant	Yvoir	/
(European Union) Belgium Wallonia Region Namur Province	Anhée	Yvoir	Houx (Yvoir) Railway bridge line 154 Dinant - Namur Anhée Molignée Pont d'Anhée (N92 Namur - Dinant) Yvoir Bocq**Bocq** Hun (Anhée) Rouillon (Anhée) Pont de Rouillon (N947a)
(European Union) Belgium Wallonia Region Namur Province	Profondeville	Yvoir	Godinne (Yvoir) Rivière (Profondeville)
(European Union) Belgium Wallonia Region Namur Province	Profondeville	Profondeville	Burnot Burnot Pont de Lustin (N947) Profondeville Tailfer Ruisseau de Tailfer
(European Union) Belgium Wallonia Region Namur Province	Namur	Profondeville	Boreuville (Namur)
(European Union) Belgium Wallonia Region Namur Province	Namur	Namur	Pont de Wépion Grand Ry Dave Ruisseau de Dave Wépion Marlagne La Plante Pont de Jambes Jambes Passerelle l'Enjambée **Sambre** **Namur** Pont des Ardennes (N90 Namur - Liège) Houyoux Railway bridge 'Pont de Luxembourg' line 154 Dinant - Namur Bouge Pont des Grands Malades (N905) Viaduc du Beez (E411 Namur - Arlon) Beez Lives-sur-Meuse Brumagne Gelbresse Marche-les-Dames
(European Union) Belgium Wallonia Region Namur Province	Andenne	Andenne	Samson Samson Pont de Namêche (N942) Namêche Sclayn Pont de N968 Ruisseau de la Loysse Seilles **Andenne** Pont d'Andenne (N921) Andenelle
(European Union) Belgium Wallonia Region Liège Province	Wanze	Huy	Gisves (Huy) Java (Wanze) Ben (Huy) Bas-Oha (Wanze) Solière Pont Père Pire (N643) Wanze Mehaigne
(European Union) Belgium Wallonia Region Liège Province	Huy	Huy	Anhin Railway bridge Pont Roi Baudouin (N64 Tienen - Huy) **Huy** Hoyoux Pont de l'Europe
(European Union) Belgium Wallonia Region Liège Province	Amay	Huy	Tihange Nuclear Power Station Tihange (Huy) Pont d'Ampsin (N684) Ampsin (Amay) Neuville-sous-Huy (Huy)
(European Union) Belgium Wallonia Region Liège Province	Amay	Amay	Pont d'Ombret (N696) Amay Ombret-Rawsa
(European Union) Belgium Wallonia Region Liège Province	Amay	Engis	Ruisseau d'Oxhe Flône (Amay)
(European Union) Belgium Wallonia Region Liège Province	Saint-Georges-sur-Meuse	Engis	Pont de Hermalle Hermalle-sous-Huy (Engis) Mallieue (Saint-Georges-sur-Meuse)
(European Union) Belgium Wallonia Region Liège Province	Engis	Engis	Engis Pont d'Engis (N639)
(European Union) Belgium Wallonia Region Liège Province	Flémalle	Flémalle	Ramioul Ramet Chokier Ivoz Pont barrage d'Ivoz-Ramet (N677) Flémalle
(European Union) Belgium Wallonia Region Liège Province	Flémalle	Seraing	Ruisseau de Ville en Cour Railway bridge line 125A (Liers - Liège - Flémalle-Haute) Val
(European Union) Belgium Wallonia Region Liège Province	Seraing	Seraing	Troque Jemeppe-sur-Meuse **Seraing** Pont de Seraing (A604 highway Liège Airport - Seraing)
(European Union) Belgium Wallonia Region Liège Province	Saint-Nicolas	Seraing	Tilleur (Saint-Nicolas)
(European Union) Belgium Wallonia Region Liège Province	Liège	Seraing	Ougrée (Seraing) Sclessin (Liège) Pont d'Ougrée (N63 Liège - Marche-en-Famenne) Railway bridge cargo line
(European Union) Belgium Wallonia Region Liège Province	Liège	Liège	Kinkempois Pont de Liège (E25 highway Liège - Luxembourg City ) Railway bridge high speed line 3 (Liège - Aachen (Germany) ) Angleur Canal de l'Ourthe Pont de Fragnée **Ourthe** Passerelle la Belle Liègeoise Pont du Roi Albert 1er (N30) Pont Kennedy Passerelle Saucy **Liège** Pont des Arches (N3 Liège – Germany ) Pont Maghin Pont Atlas Bressoux Jupille-sur-Meuse **Albert Canal** Pont - Barrage de Monsin Monsin Island Canal de Monsin
(European Union) Belgium Wallonia Region Liège Province	Herstal	Liège	Herstal Wandre (Liège) Pont de Wandre (N667) Pont d'Autorute E40 (Liège - Aachen (Germany) )
(European Union) Belgium Wallonia Region Liège Province	Oupeye	Visé	Cheratte (Visé) Argenteau (Visé) Julienne Hermalle-sous-Argenteau (Oupeye) Pont de Hermalle-sous-Argenteau Richelle (Visé) Pont Trilogiport
(European Union) Belgium Wallonia Region Liège Province	Visé	Visé	Visé Pont de Visé (N618) Canal de Haccourt - Visé Railway bridge 'Pont des Allemands' Pont et barrage de Lixhe (N602)
(European Union) / / (Limburg (Belgium)) Belgium Wallonia Region / Flanders Region Liège Province / Limburg Province	Visé (Wallonia)	Voeren (Flanders)	Lixhe (Visé) Berwinne Nivelle (Visé)
(European Union) / / (Limburg (Netherlands)) Belgium / Netherlands Wallonia Region / Limburg Province Liège Province (Belgium)	Visé (Belgium)	Eijsden-Margraten (Netherlands)	Voer Eijsden (Eijsden-Margraten) Lanaye (Visé) Bike ferry service Lanaye - Eijsden Canal de Lanaye Petit Lanaye (Visé)
(European Union) (Limburg (Netherlands)) Netherlands Limburg Province	Maastricht	Maastricht	**Maastricht** John F. Kennedybrug N278 (Maastricht - Aachen (Germany) ) Jeker**Jeker** Pedestrial bridge 'Hoge Brug' Pedestrial bridge 'Sint-Servaasbrug' Wilhelminabrug Railway bridge Maastricht Noorderbrug **Zuid-Willemsvaart** **Juliana Canal** Borgharen
(European Union) / / (Limburg (Netherlands)) (Limburg (Belgium)) Belgium / Netherlands Flanders Region / Limburg Province Limburg (Belgium)	Lanaken (Belgium)	Maastricht (Netherlands)	Smeermaas (Lanaken) Itteren (Maastricht) Neerharen (Lanaken)
(European Union) / / (Limburg (Netherlands)) (Limburg (Belgium)) Belgium / Netherlands Flanders Region / Limburg Province Limburg (Belgium)	Maasmechelen (Belgium)	Meerssen (Netherlands)	Geul Uikhoven (Maasmechelen) Bike ferry service Uikhoven - Geulle aan de Maas Geulle aan de Maas (Meerssen) Oude Broekgraaf
(European Union) / / (Limburg (Netherlands)) (Limburg (Belgium)) Belgium / Netherlands Flanders Region / Limburg Province Limburg (Belgium)	Maasmechelen (Belgium)	Stein (Netherlands)	Kotem Elsloo Scharbergbrug (E314 (Belgium) / A76 (Netherlands) Genk (Belgium) - Heerlen (Netherlands) - Aachen (Germany) ) Stein Meers **Maasmechelen** Kirkbeek Maasband Leut (Maasmechelen) Ur Urmond (Stein) Berg aan de Maas (Stein) Car ferry service Meeswijk - Berg aan de Maas
(European Union) / / (Limburg (Netherlands)) (Limburg (Belgium)) Belgium / Netherlands Flanders Region / Limburg Province Limburg (Belgium)	Dilsen-Stokkem (Belgium)	Sittard-Geleen (Netherlands)	Obbicht (Sittard-Geleen) Boyen (Dilsen-Stokkem) Vrietselbeek Bike ferry service Rotem - Grevenbicht Grevenbicht (Sittard-Geleen) Kogbeek Kingbeek
(European Union) / / (Limburg (Netherlands)) (Limburg (Belgium)) Belgium / Netherlands Flanders Region / Limburg Province Limburg (Belgium)	Dilsen-Stokkem (Belgium)	Echt-Susteren (Netherlands)	Illikhoven (Sittard-Geleen) Visserweert (Sittard-Geleen)
(European Union) / / (Limburg (Netherlands)) (Limburg (Belgium)) Belgium / Netherlands Flanders Region / Limburg Province Limburg (Belgium)	Maaseik (Belgium)	Echt-Susteren (Netherlands)	Heppeneert (Maaseik) Kokkelert (Sittard-Geleen) Zanderbeek **Maaseik** Pater Sangersbrug (N761 (Belgium) / N296 (Netherlands) Maaseik (Belgium) - Susteren (Netherlands) )
(European Union) / / (Limburg (Netherlands)) (Limburg (Belgium)) Belgium / Netherlands Flanders Region / Limburg Province Limburg (Belgium)	Maaseik (Belgium)	Maasgouw (Netherlands)	Ohé en Laak (Maasgouw) Bosbeek Aldeneik (Maaseik)
(European Union) / / (Limburg (Netherlands)) (Limburg (Belgium)) Belgium / Netherlands Flanders Region / Limburg Province Limburg (Belgium)	Kinrooi (Belgium)	Maasgouw (Netherlands)	Ophoven (Kinrooi) Bike ferry service Ophoven - Ohé en Laak Albeek Stevensweert (Maasgouw)
(European Union) (Limburg (Netherlands)) Netherlands Limburg Province	Maasgouw	Maasgouw	Maasbracht Wessem Bike ferry service Thorn - Wessem Bike ferry service Maasbracht - Wessem Maasbrug bij Wessem (A2 Eindhoven - Maastricht) **Juliana Canal** Wessem-Nederweert Canal Linne-Buggenum Canal
(European Union) (Limburg (Netherlands)) Netherlands Limburg Province	Roermond	Maasgouw	Vlootbeek Linne (Maasgouw)
(European Union) (Limburg (Netherlands)) Netherlands Limburg Province	Roermond	Roermond	Merum Bike ferry service Ool - Oolderhuuske Ool Herten **Roermond** **Rur** Louis Raemaekersbrug (N280 Roermond - Weert) Maasnielderbeek Railway bridge Buggenum (Iron Rhine Weert - Roermond)
(European Union) (Limburg (Netherlands)) Netherlands Limburg Province	Leudal	Roermond	Linne-Buggenum Canal Buggenum (Leudal) Neerbeek **Swalm**
(European Union) (Limburg (Netherlands)) Netherlands Limburg Province	Leudal	Beesel	Bike ferry service Neer - Rijkel Rijkel (Beesel) Neer (Leudal)
(European Union) (Limburg (Netherlands)) Netherlands Limburg Province	Peel en Maas	Beesel	Beesel Kessel-Eik (Peel en Maas) Huilbeek Kessel (Peel en Maas) Car ferry service Kessel - Beesel Tasbeek Reuver (Beesel) Scheikensbeek
(European Union) (Limburg (Netherlands)) Netherlands Limburg Province	Peel en Maas	Venlo	Oijen (Peel en Maas) Belfeld (Venlo) Aalsbeek Steyl (Venlo) Car ferry service Baarlo - Steyl
(European Union) (Limburg (Netherlands)) Netherlands Limburg Province	Venlo	Venlo	Engerbeek Tegelen Springbeek Zuiderbrug (A73 Nijmegen - Venlo) Wijlderbeek Blerick Stadsbrug Venlo (N556) Railway bridge Venlo (Venlo–Eindhoven and Nijmegen–Venlo lines) **Venlo** Rijnbeek Stepkensbeek Noorderbrug (A67 Venlo - Duisburg (Germany) )
(European Union) (Limburg (Netherlands)) Netherlands Limburg Province	Horst aan de Maas	Venlo	Stopbeek Baarsdonk Everlose Beek Vorstermolenbeek Grubbenvorst (Horst aan de Maas) Velden (Venlo) Car ferry service Grubbenvorst - Velden Latbeek Hasselt (Venlo) Salderbeek Houthuizen (Horst aan de Maas) Molenbeek van Lotum Lomm (Venlo) Wielder (Horst aan de Maas) Tassbeek Lottum (Horst aan de Maas) Car ferry service Lottum - Lomm Pedestrian ferry service Lottum - Arcen Arcen (Venlo) Aarsbeek Broekhuizen (Horst aan de Maas) Car ferry service Broekhuizen - Arcen Molenbeek Broekhuizenvorst (Horst aan de Maas) Rode Beek
(European Union) (Limburg (Netherlands)) Netherlands Limburg Province	Horst aan de Maas	Bergen	Geldernsch-Nierkanaal
(European Union) (Limburg (Netherlands)) Netherlands Limburg Province	Venray	Bergen	Wellerlooi (Bergen) Blitterswijck (Venray) Bike ferry service Blitterswijck - Wellerlooi Sohr Koninginnebrug N270 (Venray - Eindhoven) Well (Bergen) Wanssum (Venray) Grote Molenbeek Oostrumsche Beek Geijsteren (Venray)
(European Union) (Limburg (Netherlands)) / Netherlands Limburg Province / North Brabant province	Land van Cuijk (North Brabant)	Bergen (Limburg (Netherlands))	Maashees Ayensebeek Aijen (Bergen) Vierlingsbeek (Land van Cuijk) Car ferry service Vierlingsbeek - Bergen Bergen Molenbeek Heukelomsebeek Heukelom (Bergen) Eckeltse Beek Rekgraaf Afferden (Bergen) Car ferry service Sambeek - Afferden Sint-Jansbeek Sambeek (Land van Cuijk)
(European Union) (Limburg (Netherlands)) / Netherlands Limburg Province / North Brabant province	Land van Cuijk (North Brabant)	Gennep (Limburg (Netherlands))	Boxmeer (Land van Cuijk) Maasbrug van Boxmeer (A77 Boxmeer - Cologne (Germany) ) Heijen (Gennep) Gennep Maasbrug van Gennep (N264 Gennep - Veghel) **Niers** Oeffeltsche Raam Milsbeek (Gennep) Tielebeek
(European Union) (Limburg (Netherlands)) / Netherlands Limburg Province / North Brabant province	Land van Cuijk (North Brabant)	Mook en Middelaar (Limburg (Netherlands))	Sint-Agatha (Land van Cuijk) Middelaar (Mook en Middelaar) Virdsche Graaf Cuijk (Land van Cuijk) Car ferry service Cuijk - Middelaar Mooks Kanaal Mook (Mook en Middelaar) Katwijk (Land van Cuijk) Railway bridge Mook (Nijmegen–Venlo line) Molenhoek (Mook en Middelaar)
(European Union) / Netherlands Gelderland / North Brabant province	Land van Cuijk (North Brabant)	Heumen (Gelderland)	**Maas–Waal Canal** Heumen Maasbrug van Heumen (A73 Nijmegen - Venlo) Overasselt (Heumen) Tochtsloot Grave (Land van Cuijk) John S. Thompsonbrug (N324 Grave - Nijmegen) Nederasselt (Heumen) **Raam**
(European Union) / Netherlands Gelderland / North Brabant province	Land van Cuijk (North Brabant)	Wijchen (Gelderland)	Balgoij (Wijchen)
(European Union) / Netherlands Gelderland / North Brabant province	Oss (North Brabant)	Wijchen (Gelderland)	Keent (Oss) Neerloon (Oss) Niftrik (Wijchen) Maasbrug van Ravenstein (A50 Nijmegen - Eindhoven) Ravenstein (Oss) Bike ferry service Ravenstein - Niftrik Railway bridge 'Edithbrug' (Tilburg-Nijmegen line) Neerlangel (Oss) Demen (Oss) Batenburg (Wijchen) Bike ferry service Demen - Batenburg Dieden (Oss)
(European Union) / Netherlands Gelderland / North Brabant province	Oss (North Brabant)	West Maas en Waal (Gelderland)	Nieuwe Wetering Appeltern (West Maas en Waal) De Vliet Car ferry service Appeltern - Megen Megen (Oss) Car ferry service Maasbommel - Megen-West Maasbommel (West Maas en Waal) Burgemeester Delenkanaal Boveneind (Oss) Berghuizen (West Maas en Waal) Oijen (Oss) Car ferry service Oijen - Nieuwe Schans Greffeling (West Maas en Waal) Alphen (West Maas en Waal) Lithoijen (Oss) Lith (Oss) Moordhuizen (West Maas en Waal) Car ferry service Lith - Moordhuizen
(European Union) / Netherlands Gelderland / North Brabant province	Oss (North Brabant)	Maasdriel (Gelderland)	Voorne (Maasdriel) Heerewaarden (Maasdriel) Bike ferry service Heerewaarden - Lithse Ham Maren-Kessel (Oss) Sint Andries canal Car ferry service Alem - Maren-Kessel 't Wild (Oss) Kerkdriel (Maasdriel) Hertogswetering Hoefgraaf
(European Union) / Netherlands Gelderland / North Brabant province	's-Hertogenbosch (North Brabant)	Maasdriel (Gelderland)	Gewande ('s-Hertogenbosch) Hoenzadriel (Maasdriel) Máxima Canal Empel ('s-Hertogenbosch) Maasbrug van Empel (A2 's-Hertogenbosch - Utrecht) **'s-Hertogenbosch** Railway bridge 'Hedelse spoorbrug' (Utrecht–Boxtel line) Prinses Irenebrigadebrug Hedel (Maasdriel) Oude Dieze **Dieze** Bokhoven ('s-Hertogenbosch) Ammerzoden (Maasdriel)
(European Union) / Netherlands Gelderland / North Brabant province	Heusden (North Brabant)	Maasdriel (Gelderland)	Well (Maasdriel) Zooislagen Buitendijkse Loop
(European Union) / Netherlands Gelderland / North Brabant province	Heusden (North Brabant)	Zaltbommel (Gelderland)	Car ferry service Bern - Herpt Bern (Zaltbommel) Heusden Heusden Canal
(European Union) Netherlands North Brabant province	Heusden	Altena	Maasbrug van Heusden (N267 Heusden - Giessen) Heesbeen (Heusden) Genderen (Altena) Doeveren (Heusden)
(European Union) Netherlands North Brabant province	Waalwijk	Altena	Afwateringskanaal 's-Hertogenbosch - Drongelen Drongelen (Altena) **Waalwijk** Car ferry service Drongelen - Waalwijk Car ferry service Dussen - Capelle Dussen (Altena)
(European Union) Netherlands North Brabant province	Geertruidenberg	Altena	Peerenboom (Altena) Keizersveerbrug (A27 Breda - Utrecht) Raamsdonksveer (Geertruidenberg) Geertruidenberg Nieuwe Merwede **Mouth into the North Sea**

== Mention in patriotic songs ==
The Meuse (Maas) is mentioned in the first stanza of Germany's old national anthem, the Deutschlandlied. However, since its re-adoption as national anthem in 1952, only the third stanza of the Deutschlandlied has been sung as the German national anthem, the first and second stanzas being omitted. This was confirmed after German reunification in 1991 when only the third stanza was defined as the official anthem. The lyrics written in 1841 describe a then–disunited Germany with the river as its western boundary, where King William I of the Netherlands had joined the German Confederation with his Duchy of Limburg in 1839. Though the duchy's territory officially became an integral part of the Netherlands by the 1867 Treaty of London, the text passage remained unchanged when the Deutschlandlied was declared the national anthem of the Weimar Republic in 1922.

The name of the rivers also forms part of the title of "Le Régiment de Sambre et Meuse", written after the French defeat in the Franco-Prussian War of 1870, and a popular patriotic song for the rest of the 19th century and into the 20th.

== See also ==
- 1930 Meuse Valley fog
- Moulin de Rouvres
- Rida (River)
- List of rivers by age
