= Ugny-sur-Meuse =

- Commune
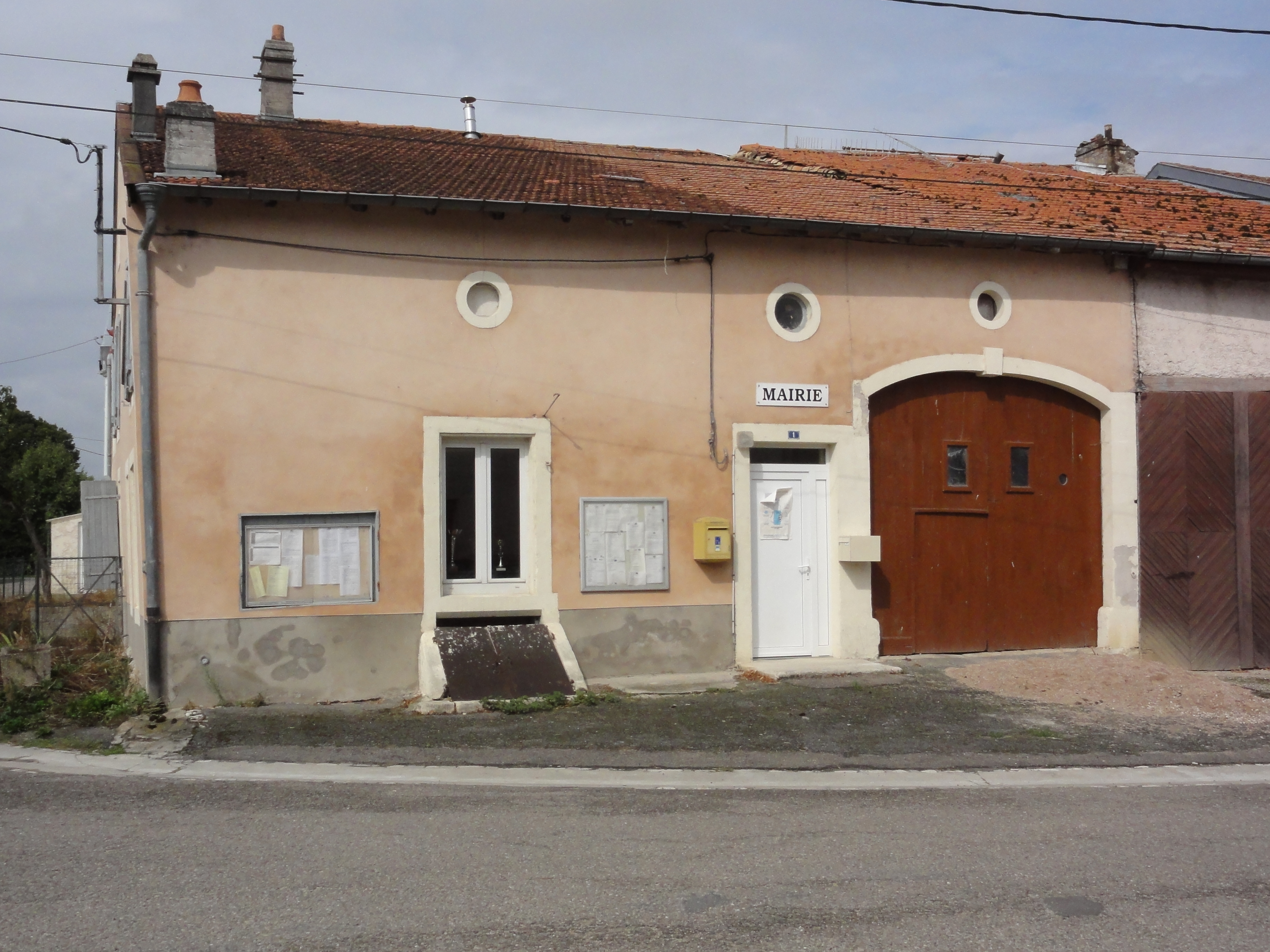
- The town hall in Ugny-sur-Meuse

- Coat of arms
- Location of Ugny-sur-Meuse
- Location within France Location within Grand Est
- Coordinates: 48°38′25″N 5°42′17″E
- Country: France
- Region: Grand Est
- Department: Meuse
- Arrondissement: Commercy
- Canton: Vaucouleurs

Government
  - Mayor (2020–2026): Régis Figel
- Area^{1}: 4.29 km^{2} (1.66 sq mi)
- Elevation: 255 m (837 ft)
- Highest elevation: 305 m (1,001 ft)
- Lowest elevation: 240 m (790 ft)
- Population (2023): 103
  - Density: 24.0/km^{2} (62.2/sq mi)
- Time zone: UTC+01:00 (CET)
  - Summer (DST): UTC+02:00 (CEST)
- INSEE/Postal code: 55522 /55140
- ^{1} French Land Register data, which excludes lakes, ponds, glaciers > 1 km^{2} (0.386 sq mi or 247 acres) and river estuaries.

Ugny-sur-Meuse (French pronunciation: [yɲi syʁ møz], literally Ugny on Meuse) is a commune in the Meuse department in Grand Est in north-eastern France.

== See also ==
- Communes of the Meuse department
