= Audeloncourt =

- Commune
- Location of Audeloncourt
- Location within France Location within Grand Est
- Coordinates: 48°06′37″N 5°31′18″E
- Country: France
- Region: Grand Est
- Department: Haute-Marne
- Arrondissement: Chaumont
- Canton: Poissons
- Intercommunality: CC Meuse Rognon

Government
  - Mayor (2020–2026): Dominique Begin
- Area^{1}: 11.6 km^{2} (4.5 sq mi)
- Elevation: 340 m (1,120 ft)
- Population (2023): 77
  - Density: 6.6/km^{2} (17/sq mi)
- Time zone: UTC+01:00 (CET)
  - Summer (DST): UTC+02:00 (CEST)
- INSEE/Postal code: 52025 /52240
- ^{1} French Land Register data, which excludes lakes, ponds, glaciers > 1 km^{2} (0.386 sq mi or 247 acres) and river estuaries.

Audeloncourt (French pronunciation: [odlɔ̃kuʁ]) is a commune in the Haute-Marne department in the Grand Est region in northeastern France.

== Population ==
Historical population
Year	Pop.	±% p.a.
1968	164	—
1975	150	−1.27%
1982	129	−2.13%
1990	114	−1.53%
1999	98	−1.67%
2007	100	+0.25%
2012	89	−2.30%
2017	87	−0.45%
2023	77	−2.01%
Source: INSEE

== See also ==
- Communes of the Haute-Marne department
