= Levécourt =

- Commune
- Location of Levécourt
- Location within France Location within Grand Est
- Coordinates: 48°08′25″N 5°33′42″E
- Country: France
- Region: Grand Est
- Department: Haute-Marne
- Arrondissement: Chaumont
- Canton: Poissons

Government
  - Mayor (2020–2026): Monique Charlet
- Area^{1}: 6.7 km^{2} (2.6 sq mi)
- Elevation: 325 m (1,066 ft)
- Population (2023): 91
  - Density: 14/km^{2} (35/sq mi)
- Time zone: UTC+01:00 (CET)
  - Summer (DST): UTC+02:00 (CEST)
- INSEE/Postal code: 52287 /52150
- ^{1} French Land Register data, which excludes lakes, ponds, glaciers > 1 km^{2} (0.386 sq mi or 247 acres) and river estuaries.

Levécourt (French pronunciation: [ləvekuʁ]) is a commune in the Haute-Marne department in north-eastern France. The Hemony brothers, carillon bell founders in Amsterdam in the 17th century, were born here.

== See also ==
- Communes of the Haute-Marne department
