= Champougny =

- Commune
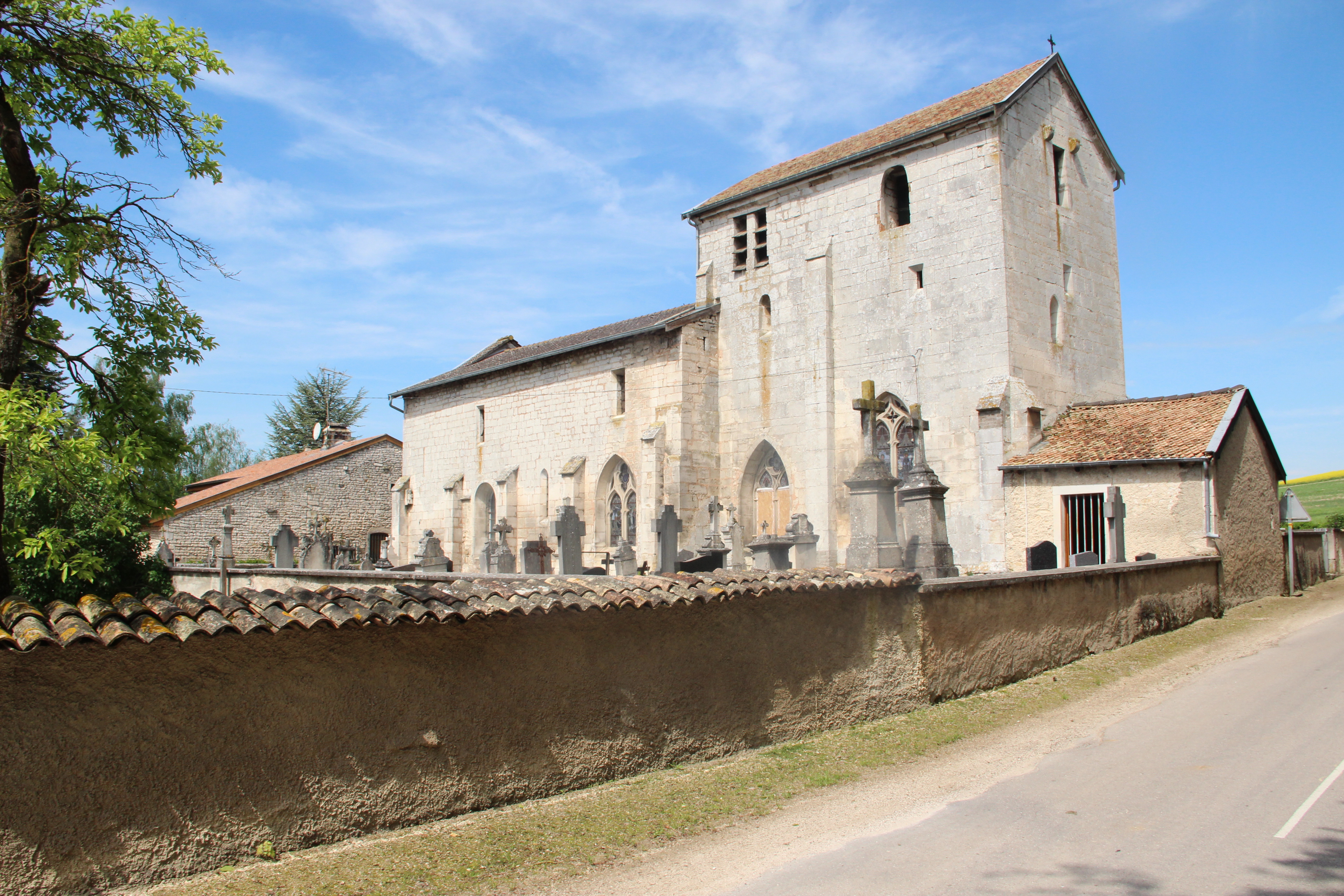
- The church in Champougny

- Coat of arms
- Location of Champougny
- Location within France Location within Grand Est
- Coordinates: 48°32′43″N 5°41′44″E
- Country: France
- Region: Grand Est
- Department: Meuse
- Arrondissement: Commercy
- Canton: Vaucouleurs

Government
  - Mayor (2020–2026): Éric Vincent
- Area^{1}: 5.91 km^{2} (2.28 sq mi)
- Population (2023): 92
  - Density: 16/km^{2} (40/sq mi)
- Time zone: UTC+01:00 (CET)
  - Summer (DST): UTC+02:00 (CEST)
- INSEE/Postal code: 55100 /55140
- ^{1} French Land Register data, which excludes lakes, ponds, glaciers > 1 km^{2} (0.386 sq mi or 247 acres) and river estuaries.

Champougny (French pronunciation: [ʃɑ̃puɲi]) is a commune in the Meuse department in Grand Est in north-eastern France.

== See also ==
- Communes of the Meuse department
