= Belleray =

- Commune
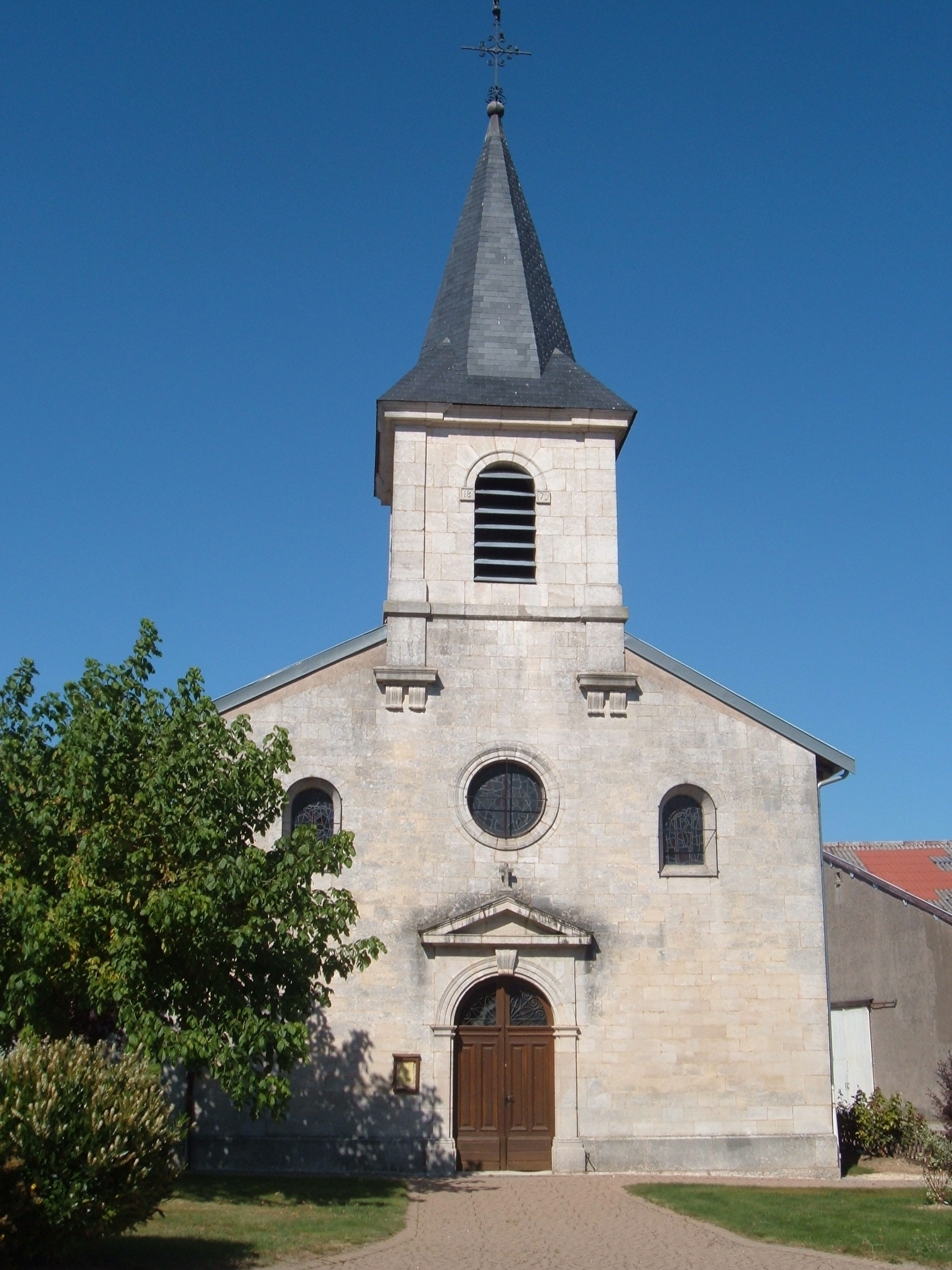
- The church in Belleray

- Coat of arms
- Location of Belleray
- Location within France Location within Grand Est
- Coordinates: 49°07′57″N 5°24′00″E
- Country: France
- Region: Grand Est
- Department: Meuse
- Arrondissement: Verdun
- Canton: Verdun-2
- Intercommunality: CA Grand Verdun

Government
  - Mayor (2020–2026): Régis Brocard
- Area^{1}: 5.1 km^{2} (2.0 sq mi)
- Elevation: 210 m (690 ft)
- Highest elevation: 298 m (978 ft)
- Lowest elevation: 196 m (643 ft)
- Population (2023): 464
  - Density: 91/km^{2} (240/sq mi)
- Time zone: UTC+01:00 (CET)
  - Summer (DST): UTC+02:00 (CEST)
- INSEE/Postal code: 55042 /55100
- ^{1} French Land Register data, which excludes lakes, ponds, glaciers > 1 km^{2} (0.386 sq mi or 247 acres) and river estuaries.

Belleray (French pronunciation: [bɛlʁɛ]) is a commune in the Meuse department in the Grand Est region in northeastern France.

== Population ==
Historical population
Year	Pop.	±% p.a.
1968	280	—
1975	379	+4.42%
1982	510	+4.33%
1990	513	+0.07%
1999	439	−1.72%
2007	421	−0.52%
2012	459	+1.74%
2017	508	+2.05%
2023	464	−1.50%
Source: INSEE

== See also ==
- Communes of the Meuse department
