= Hâcourt =

- Commune
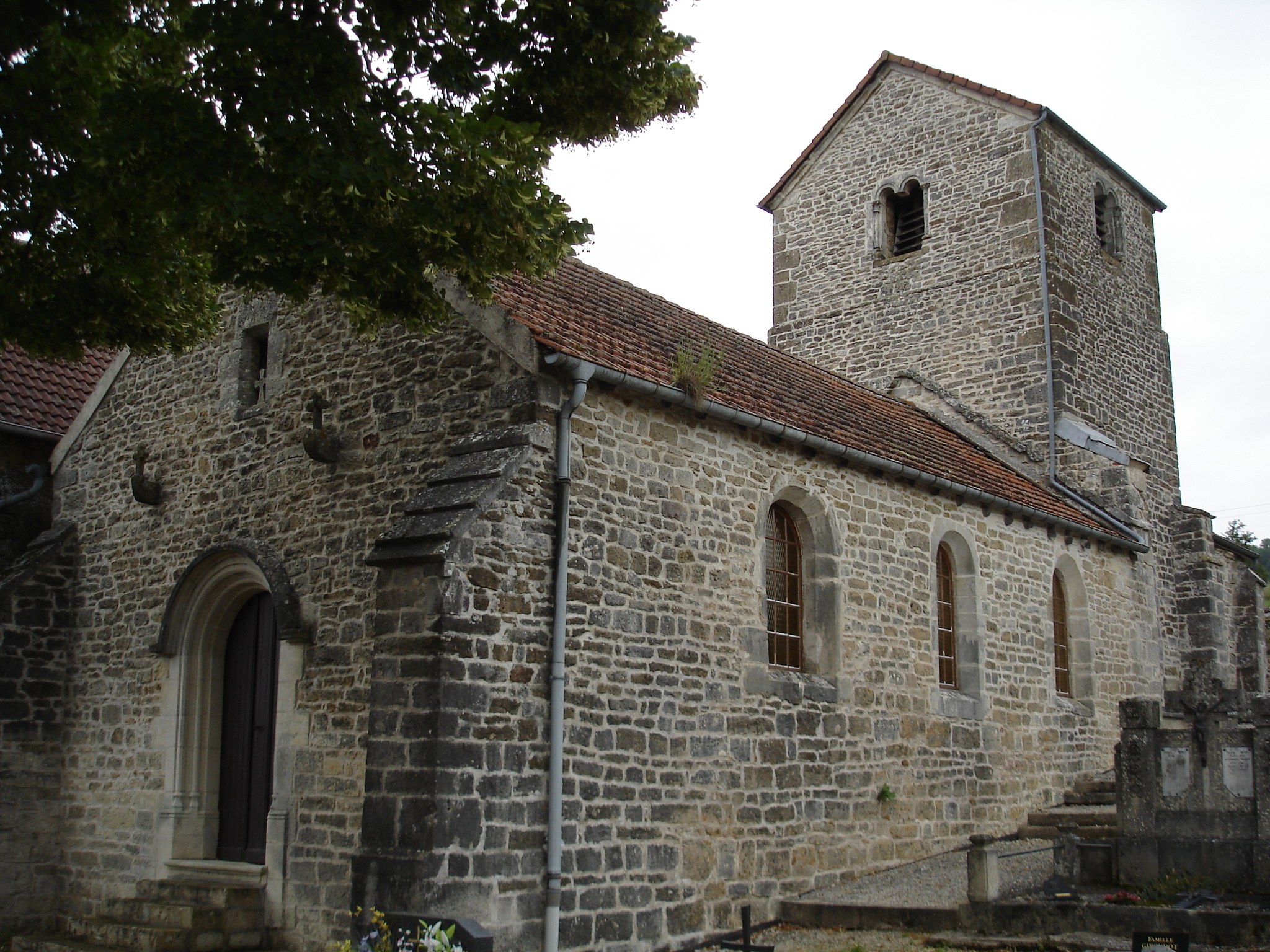
- The church in Hâcourt
- Location of Hâcourt
- Location within France Location within Grand Est
- Coordinates: 48°09′52″N 5°34′27″E
- Country: France
- Region: Grand Est
- Department: Haute-Marne
- Arrondissement: Chaumont
- Canton: Poissons
- Intercommunality: Meuse Rognon

Government
  - Mayor (2020–2026): Sébastien Huot
- Area^{1}: 2.94 km^{2} (1.14 sq mi)
- Elevation: 316 m (1,037 ft)
- Population (2023): 41
  - Density: 14/km^{2} (36/sq mi)
- Time zone: UTC+01:00 (CET)
  - Summer (DST): UTC+02:00 (CEST)
- INSEE/Postal code: 52234 /52150
- ^{1} French Land Register data, which excludes lakes, ponds, glaciers > 1 km^{2} (0.386 sq mi or 247 acres) and river estuaries.

Hâcourt (French pronunciation: [akuʁ]) is a commune in the Haute-Marne department in north-eastern France.

== Population ==
Historical population
Year	Pop.	±% p.a.
1968	47	—
1975	49	+0.60%
1982	34	−5.09%
1990	33	−0.37%
1999	33	+0.00%
2007	36	+1.09%
2012	35	−0.56%
2017	39	+2.19%
2023	41	+0.84%
Source: INSEE

== See also ==
- Communes of the Haute-Marne department
