= Niftrik =

- Village
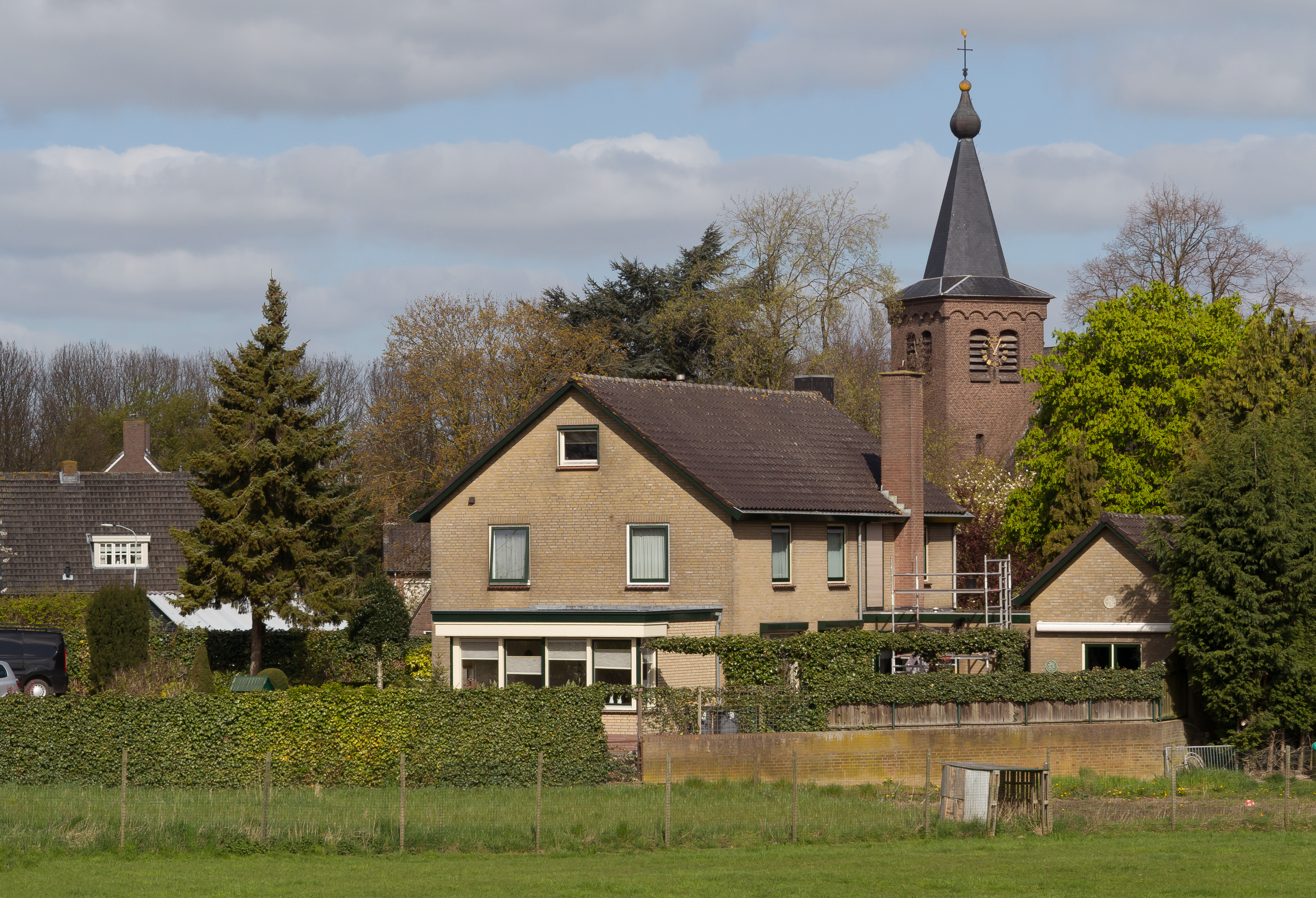
- Niftrik, churchtower in the village

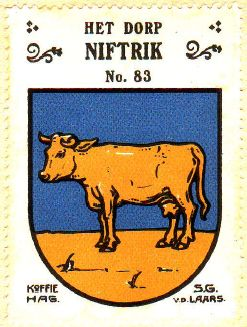
- Coat of arms

- Location in the province of Gelderland in the Netherlands Niftrik (Netherlands)
- Coordinates: 51°47′45″N 5°40′14″E
- Country: Netherlands
- Province: Gelderland
- Municipality: Wijchen

Area
  - Total: 6.74 km^{2} (2.60 sq mi)
- Elevation: 8 m (26 ft)

Population (2021)
  - Total: 405
  - Density: 60.1/km^{2} (156/sq mi)
- Time zone: UTC+1 (CET)
  - Summer (DST): UTC+2 (CEST)
- Postal code: 6606
- Dialing code: 0486

Niftrik (Dutch pronunciation: [ˈnɪftrɪk]) is a village in the Dutch province of Gelderland. It is located in the municipality of Wijchen, about 4 km southwest of that town.

The village was first mentioned in 1117 as Nifterka. The etymology is unclear.

The first church was built in 1308. After the Eighty Years' War, it became a Dutch Reformed church. In 1715, the Catholics built a clandestine church in the village. In 1795, the village church was returned to Roman Catholic church. A new church was constructed between 1891 and 1892. On 10 May 1940, the day of the German invasion of the Netherlands, the church as well as the houses which were visible over the dike were demolished by the Dutch army in order to have an unobstructed view. The church was rebuilt later that year.

Niftrik was home to 327 people 1840. Niftrik was a separate municipality until 1818, when it was merged with Wijchen.

== Gallery ==
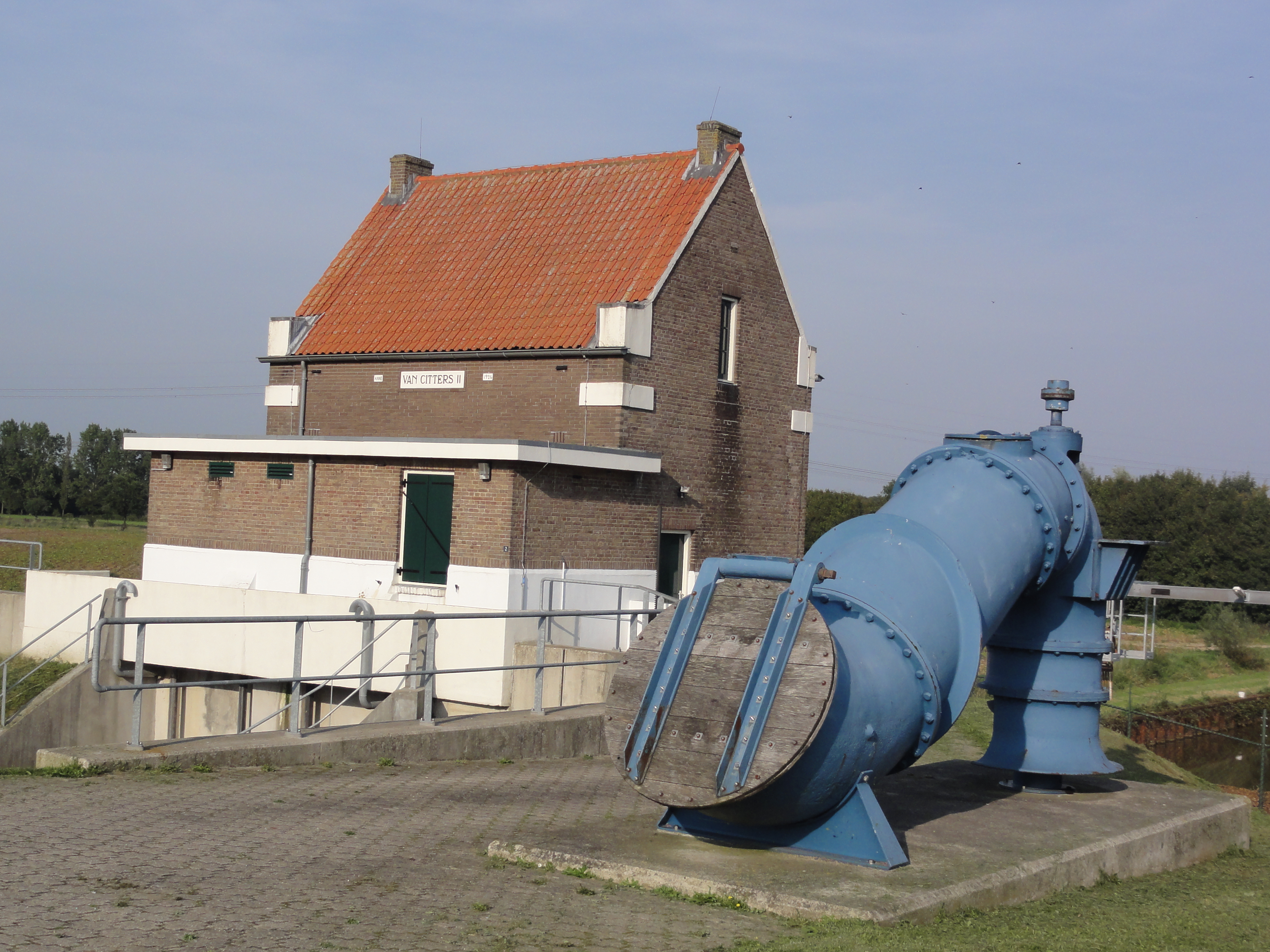
Pumping station Citters II

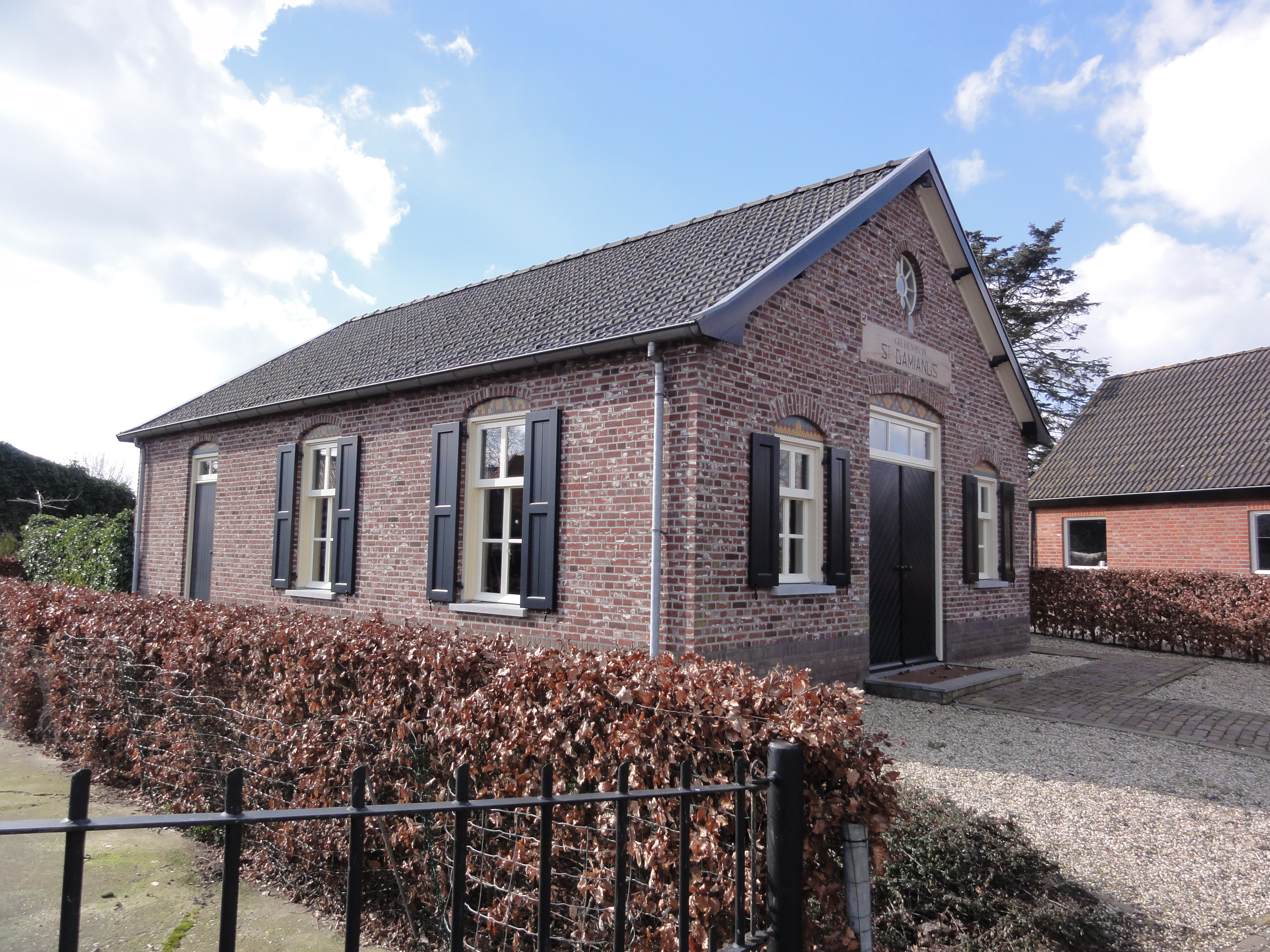
Guild House

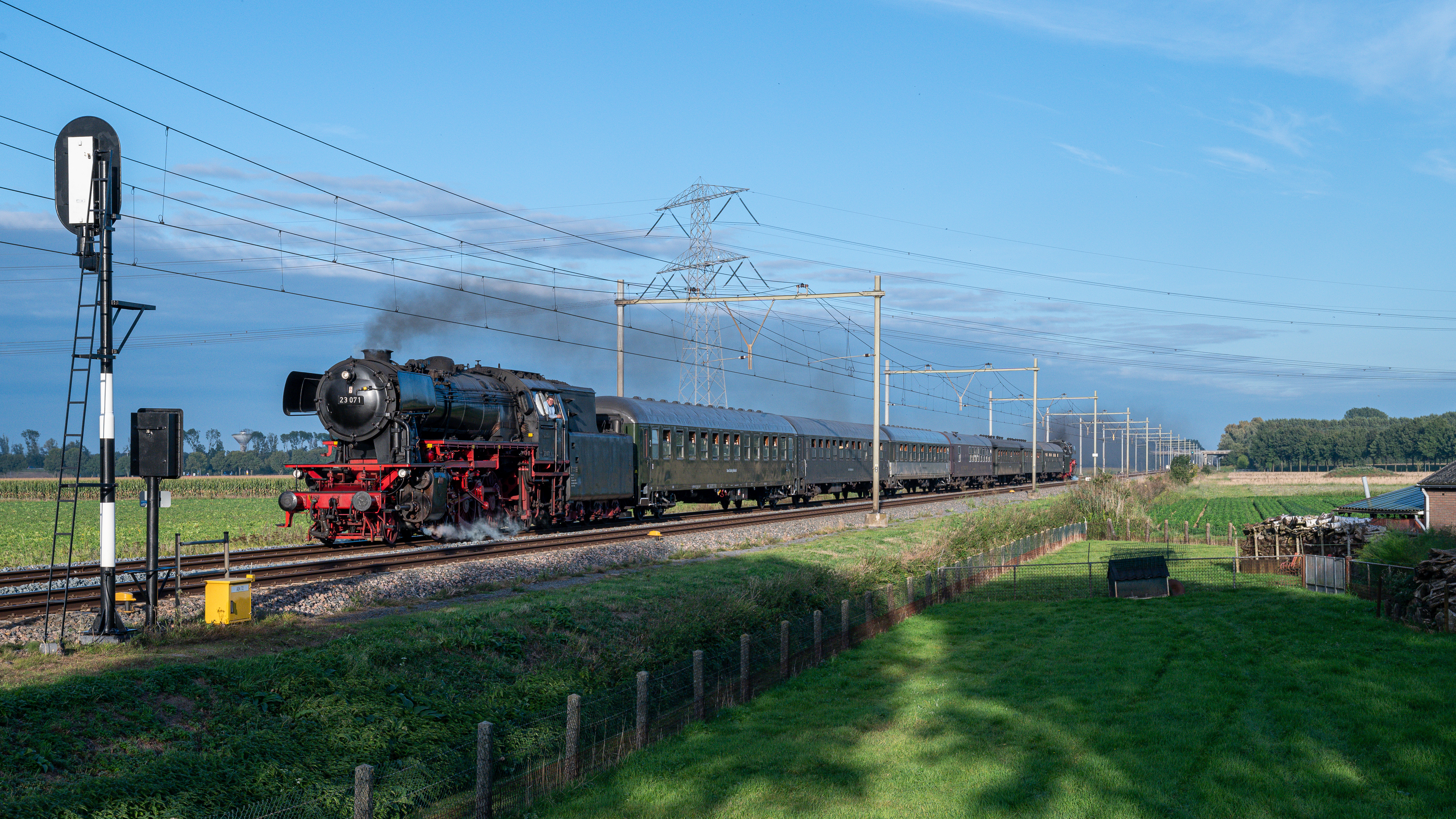
Steam train

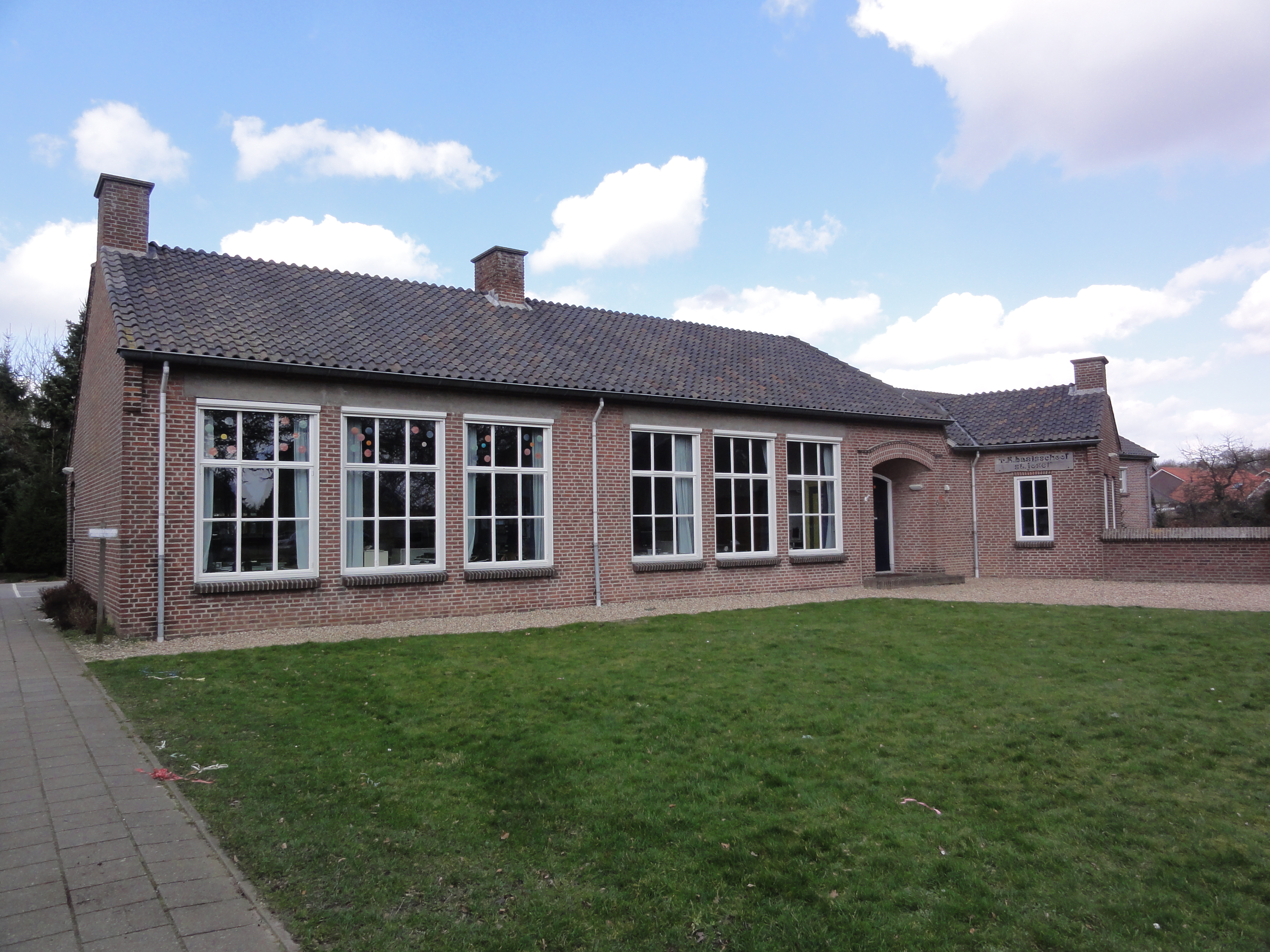
School in Niftrik
