= Montbras =

- Commune
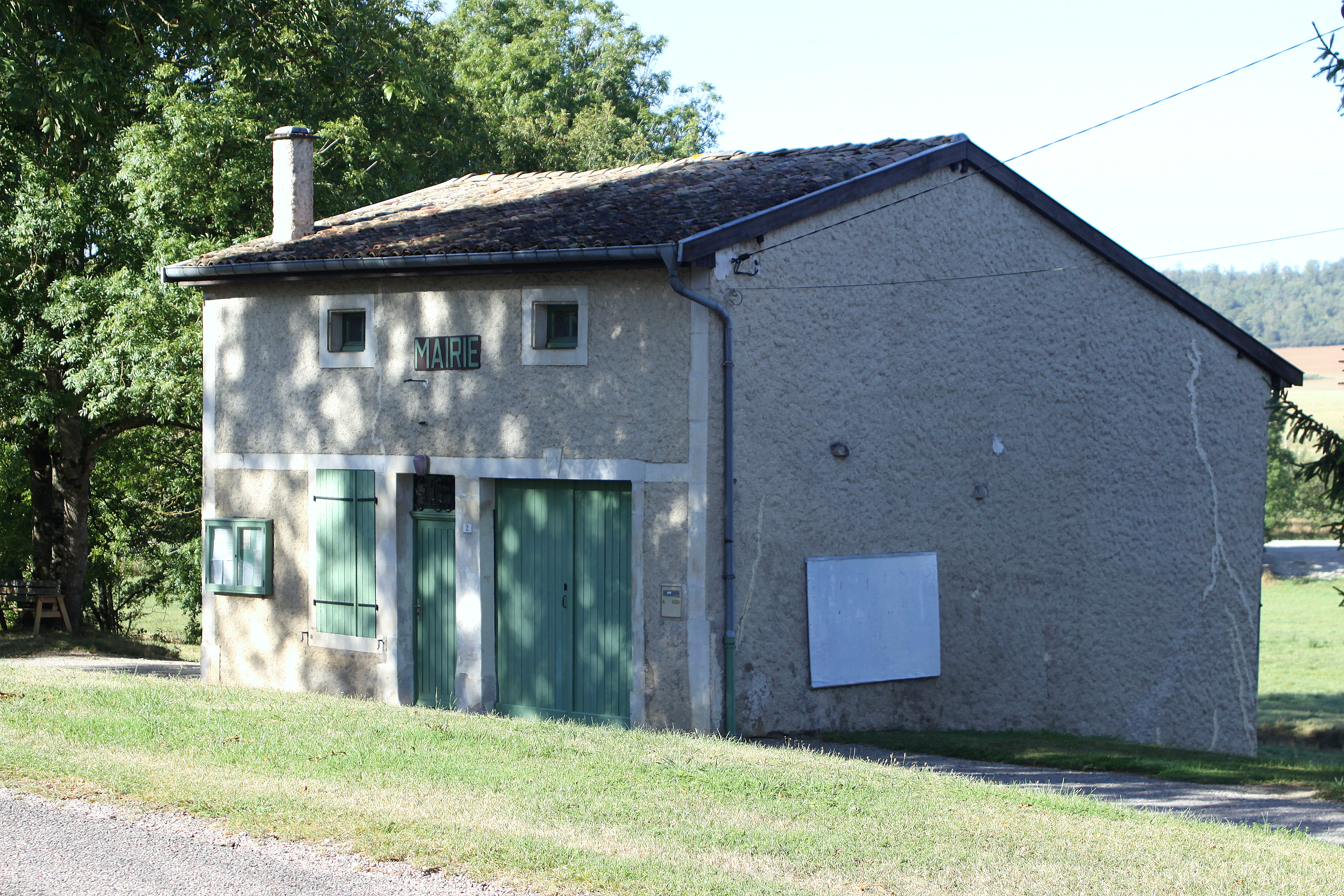
- The town hall in Montbras

- Coat of arms
- Location of Montbras
- Location within France Location within Grand Est
- Coordinates: 48°31′44″N 5°41′41″E
- Country: France
- Region: Grand Est
- Department: Meuse
- Arrondissement: Commercy
- Canton: Vaucouleurs

Government
  - Mayor (2020–2026): Jean Boyer
- Area^{1}: 5.4 km^{2} (2.1 sq mi)
- Elevation: 262 m (860 ft)
- Highest elevation: 330 m (1,080 ft)
- Lowest elevation: 257 m (843 ft)
- Population (2023): 20
  - Density: 3.7/km^{2} (9.6/sq mi)
- Time zone: UTC+01:00 (CET)
  - Summer (DST): UTC+02:00 (CEST)
- INSEE/Postal code: 55344 /55140
- ^{1} French Land Register data, which excludes lakes, ponds, glaciers > 1 km^{2} (0.386 sq mi or 247 acres) and river estuaries.

Montbras (French pronunciation: [mɔ̃bʁa]) is a commune in the Meuse department in Grand Est in north-eastern France.

== See also ==
- Communes of the Meuse department
