= Saint-Thiébault =

- Commune
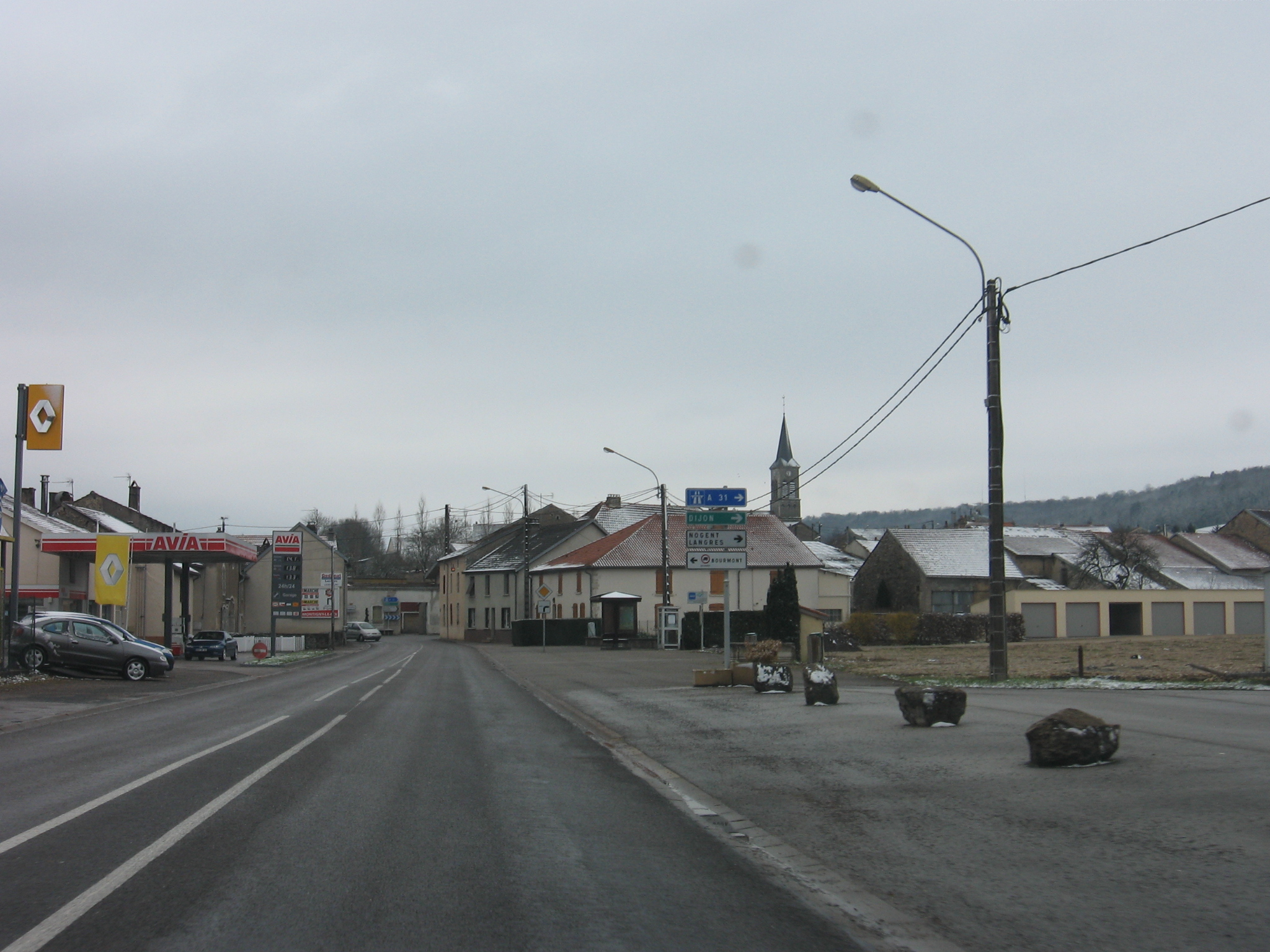
- The road into Saint-Thiébault
- Location of Saint-Thiébault
- Location within France Location within Grand Est
- Coordinates: 48°12′06″N 5°34′49″E
- Country: France
- Region: Grand Est
- Department: Haute-Marne
- Arrondissement: Chaumont
- Canton: Poissons

Government
  - Mayor (2020–2026): Marion Lerat
- Area^{1}: 0.6 km^{2} (0.23 sq mi)
- Population (2023): 257
  - Density: 430/km^{2} (1,100/sq mi)
- Time zone: UTC+01:00 (CET)
  - Summer (DST): UTC+02:00 (CEST)
- INSEE/Postal code: 52455 /52150
- ^{1} French Land Register data, which excludes lakes, ponds, glaciers > 1 km^{2} (0.386 sq mi or 247 acres) and river estuaries.

Saint-Thiébault (French pronunciation: [sɛ̃ tjebo]) is a commune in the Haute-Marne department in north-eastern France.

== See also ==
- Communes of the Haute-Marne department
