= Bourg-Sainte-Marie =

- Commune
- Location of Bourg-Sainte-Marie
- Location within France Location within Grand Est
- Coordinates: 48°10′49″N 5°33′24″E
- Country: France
- Region: Grand Est
- Department: Haute-Marne
- Arrondissement: Chaumont
- Canton: Poissons

Government
  - Mayor (2020–2026): Francis Bouvenot
- Area^{1}: 9.19 km^{2} (3.55 sq mi)
- Elevation: 330 m (1,080 ft)
- Population (2023): 83
  - Density: 9.0/km^{2} (23/sq mi)
- Time zone: UTC+01:00 (CET)
  - Summer (DST): UTC+02:00 (CEST)
- INSEE/Postal code: 52063 /52150
- ^{1} French Land Register data, which excludes lakes, ponds, glaciers > 1 km^{2} (0.386 sq mi or 247 acres) and river estuaries.

Bourg-Sainte-Marie (French pronunciation: [buʁ sɛ̃t maʁi]) is a commune in the Haute-Marne department in northeastern France.

== Population ==
Historical population
| Year | Pop. | ±% p.a. |
|---|---|---|
| 1968 | 147 | — |
| 1975 | 147 | +0.00% |
| 1982 | 125 | −2.29% |
| 1990 | 117 | −0.82% |
| 1999 | 110 | −0.68% |
| 2007 | 90 | −2.48% |
| 2012 | 99 | +1.92% |
| 2017 | 101 | +0.40% |
| 2023 | 83 | −3.22% |
Source: INSEE

== See also ==
- Communes of the Haute-Marne department
