= Neuville-lès-Vaucouleurs =

Neuville-les-Vaucouleurs
- Commune
- Coat of arms
- Location of Neuville-les-Vaucouleurs
- Location within France Location within Grand Est
- Coordinates: 48°34′42″N 5°40′25″E
- Country: France
- Region: Grand Est
- Department: Meuse
- Arrondissement: Commercy
- Canton: Vaucouleurs

Government
  - Mayor (2020–2026): Alain Tirlicien
- Area^{1}: 8.35 km^{2} (3.22 sq mi)
- Elevation: 253 m (830 ft)
- Highest elevation: 386 m (1,266 ft)
- Lowest elevation: 250 m (820 ft)
- Population (2023): 143
  - Density: 17.1/km^{2} (44.4/sq mi)
- Time zone: UTC+01:00 (CET)
  - Summer (DST): UTC+02:00 (CEST)
- INSEE/Postal code: 55381 /55140
- ^{1} French Land Register data, which excludes lakes, ponds, glaciers > 1 km^{2} (0.386 sq mi or 247 acres) and river estuaries.

Neuville-lès-Vaucouleurs (French pronunciation: [nøvil lɛ vokulœʁ], literally Neuville near Vaucouleurs) is a commune in the Meuse department in Grand Est in north-eastern France.

== See also ==
- Communes of the Meuse department
