= Lavilleneuve =

- Commune
- Location of Lavilleneuve
- Location within France Location within Grand Est
- Coordinates: 48°02′23″N 5°30′38″E
- Country: France
- Region: Grand Est
- Department: Haute-Marne
- Arrondissement: Langres
- Canton: Bourbonne-les-Bains
- Intercommunality: Grand Langres

Government
  - Mayor (2020–2026): Charlotte Roger
- Area^{1}: 5.15 km^{2} (1.99 sq mi)
- Elevation: 340 m (1,120 ft)
- Population (2023): 57
  - Density: 11/km^{2} (29/sq mi)
- Time zone: UTC+01:00 (CET)
  - Summer (DST): UTC+02:00 (CEST)
- INSEE/Postal code: 52277 /52140
- ^{1} French Land Register data, which excludes lakes, ponds, glaciers > 1 km^{2} (0.386 sq mi or 247 acres) and river estuaries.

Lavilleneuve (French pronunciation: [lavilnœv]) is a commune in the Haute-Marne department in north-eastern France.

== See also ==
- Communes of the Haute-Marne department
