= Municipalities of Limburg (Netherlands) =

This article gives a list of current and former municipalities of the Dutch province of Limburg. Limburg has 33 municipalities.

Position of Limburg within the Netherlands.

== Current municipalities ==
Municipality /	Coat of arms	Main town	Location	COROP	Inhabitants	Area (km²)	Population centres	Image
Beek		Beek		South Limburg	16,710	21.00		Timber framed houses in Spaubeek
Beekdaelen		Nuth		South Limburg	35,853	78.29		Old farmhouse in Arensgenhuis
Beesel		Reuver		Middle Limburg	13,852	29.21		Kasteel Nieuwenbroek in Beesel
Bergen		Bergen		North Limburg	13,432	109.42		Church in the town of Afferden
Brunssum		Brunssum		South Limburg	29,494	17.29		The Brunssumerheide
Echt-Susteren		Echt		Middle Limburg	32,333	104.60		Landricuskerk in Echt
Eijsden-Margraten		Margraten		South Limburg	24,839	78.46		Eijsden Castle
Gennep		Gennep		North Limburg	17,104	50.40		Gennep city hall
Gulpen-Wittem		Gulpen		South Limburg	11,419	20.76		Timber-framed house in Elzet
Heerlen		Heerlen		South Limburg	90,125	45.50		Centre of Heerlen
Horst aan de Maas		Horst		North Limburg	41,786	122.55		Church of St. Lambertus
Kerkrade		Kerkrade		South Limburg	47,421	22.17		Rolduc Abbey
Landgraaf		Landgraaf		South Limburg	38,600	24.69		Megaland, area of the annual Pinkpop festival
Leudal		Heythuysen		Middle Limburg	36,787	164.86		The Friedesse mill in Neer
Maasgouw		Heel & Maasbracht		Middle Limburg	24,318	45.81		Abbey in Thorn
Maastricht		Maastricht		South Limburg	117,548	60.06		View of Maastricht from St.-Janskerk
Meerssen		Meerssen		South Limburg	19,567	27.71		Basilica of Meerssen
Mook en Middelaar		Mook		North Limburg	8,069	18.84		The town of Mook
Nederweert		Nederweert		North Limburg	16,619	101.79		The Weerterbos
Peel en Maas		Panningen		North Limburg	43,020	161.3		Church of the village Panningen
Roerdalen		Sint Odiliënberg		Middle Limburg	21,298	88.65		View on Sint Odiliënberg
Roermond		Roermond		Middle Limburg	55,176	71.19		View on Roermond
Simpelveld		Simpelveld		South Limburg	10,995	16.03		The church of Simpelveld
Sittard-Geleen		Geleen		South Limburg	96,275	80.62		Sittard Main Square
Stein		Stein		South Limburg	25,660	22.78		Castle of Stein
Vaals		Vaals		South Limburg	9,874	23.90		Winter view over Vaals
Valkenburg aan de Geul		Valkenburg		South Limburg	17,097	36.91		Valkenburg city centre
Venlo		Venlo		North Limburg	100,328	128.44		Venlo city hall
Venray		Venray		North Limburg	42,785	146.36		Shopping street in Venray
Voerendaal		Voerendaal		South Limburg	12,711	31.55		Haeren castle
Weert		Weert		North Limburg	48,405	105.44		Martinus church in Weert

== Former municipalities ==
Municipality	Coat of arms	Main town	Location	Population centres	Image
Arcen en Velden		Arcen		Merged into municipality Venlo on 1 January 2010.	Municipality building of Arcen and Velden
Eijsden		Eijsden		Merged into municipality Eijsden-Margraten on 1 January 2011.	Eijsden Castle
Helden		Panningen		Merged into the new municipality Peel en Maas on 1 January 2010.	Church in Panningen
Kessel		Kessel		Merged into the new municipality Peel en Maas on 1 January 2010.	View on Kessel
Linne		Linne		Merged into the municipality Maasbracht, now itself part of Maasgouw, in 1991.	Martinus Church in Linne
Maasbracht		Maasbracht		Merged into the new municipality Maasgouw on 1 January 2007.	Church of Maasbracht
Margraten		Margraten		Merged into the new municipality Eijsden-Margraten on 1 January 2011.	Square in Margraten
Nuth		Nuth		Merged into the new municipality Beekdaelen on 1 January 2019.	Church of the village Schimmert
Onderbanken		Schinveld		Merged into the new municipality Beekdaelen on 1 January 2019.	Church of the village Jabeek
Schinnen		Schinnen		Merged into the new municipality Beekdaelen on 1 January 2019.	The village of Sweikhuizen
