= Stevensweert =

- Village
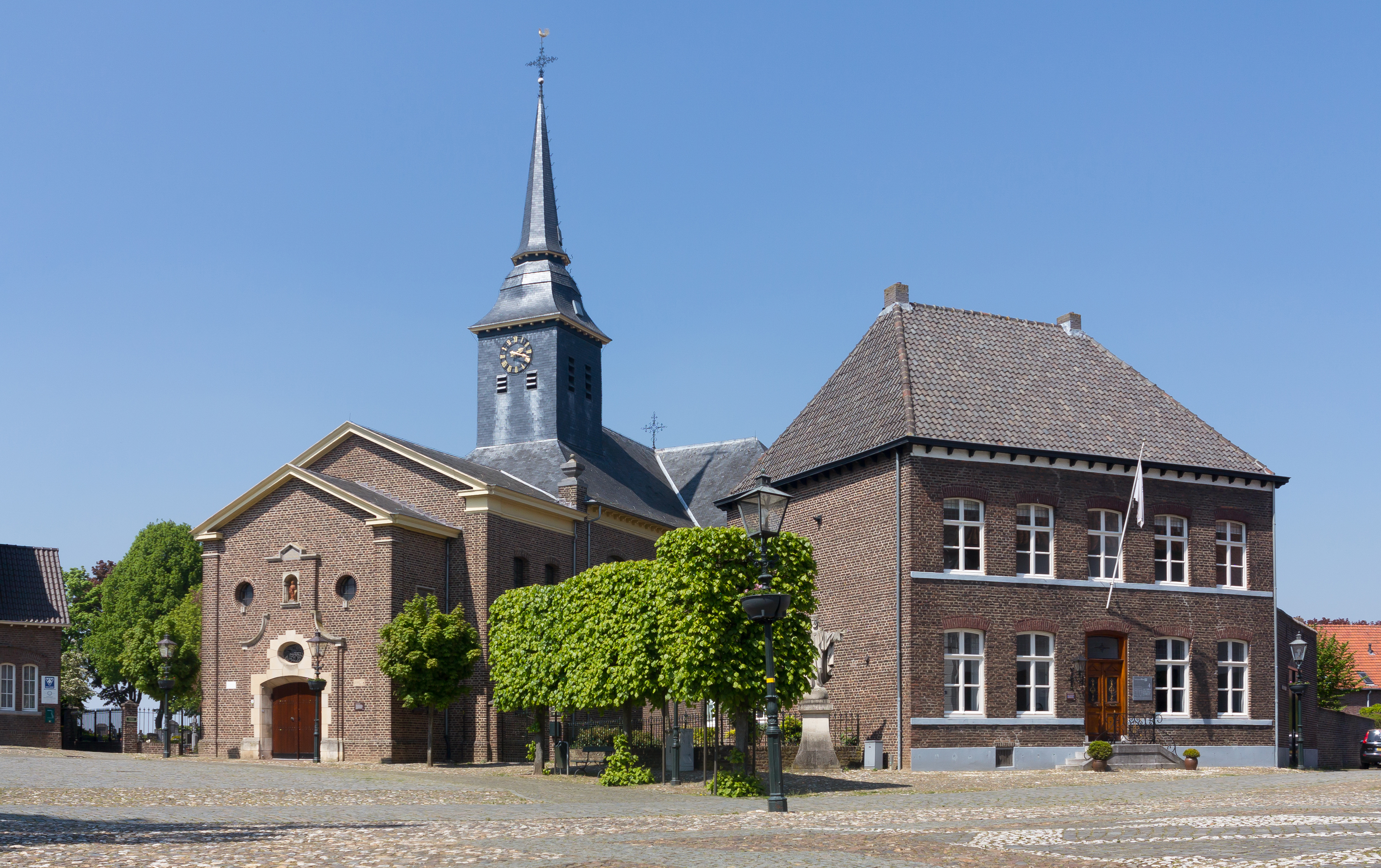
- St Stephanus Church and the presbytery

- Coat of arms

- Location in the Netherlands Location in the province of Limburg in the Netherlands
- Coordinates: 51°07′50″N 5°50′45″E
- Country: Netherlands
- Province: Limburg
- Municipality: Maasgouw

Area
  - Total: 7.39 km^{2} (2.85 sq mi)
- Elevation: 26 m (85 ft)

Population (2021)
  - Total: 1,610
  - Density: 218/km^{2} (564/sq mi)
- Time zone: UTC+1 (CET)
  - Summer (DST): UTC+2 (CEST)
- Postal code: 6107
- Dialing code: 0475

Stevensweert is a village in the Dutch province of Limburg. It is located in the municipality of Maasgouw. It lies on the right bank of the river Meuse, which forms the border with Kessenich in Belgium. There was also a ferry to this village.

== History ==
The village was first mentioned in 1221 as in Werde, and means "land near water dedicated to Saint Stephen".

With Ohé en Laak, Stevensweert is situated on an island in the Meuse. The Spanish built a fortress in 1633 during the Eighty Years War, this is still apparent in the street plan of the town. Stevensweert once was part of the Duchy of Guelders. In 1702, it was conquered by the Dutch Republic.

The Catholic St Stephanus is a cruciform church built in 1781 as a replacement of the 13th century church. It was damaged in 1944 and 1945, and restored and enlarged by Pierre Cuypers jr.. The church contains a Roman baptismal font from around 1200. The Dutch Reformed church is a little aisleless church built in 1822. In 1951, the war damage was repaired.

The grist mill Hompesche Molen was built in 1722 as part of the castle complex, and is the only remaining part. The top of the sail measures 37 metres (121 ft) making it the tallest windmill in the province of Limburg. In October 1944, it was hit several times by British artillery from the liberated Belgian side. The wind mill was restored between 1948 and 1949. In the 1950s, the mill went out of service. From 1975 to 1977, it was restored and returned to occasional service. The barn next to the mill contains a brasserie.

Stevensweert was home to 600 people in 1840. It was an independent municipality until 1991 when it was merged into Maasbracht. In 2007, it became part of the municipality of Maasgouw.

== Gallery ==
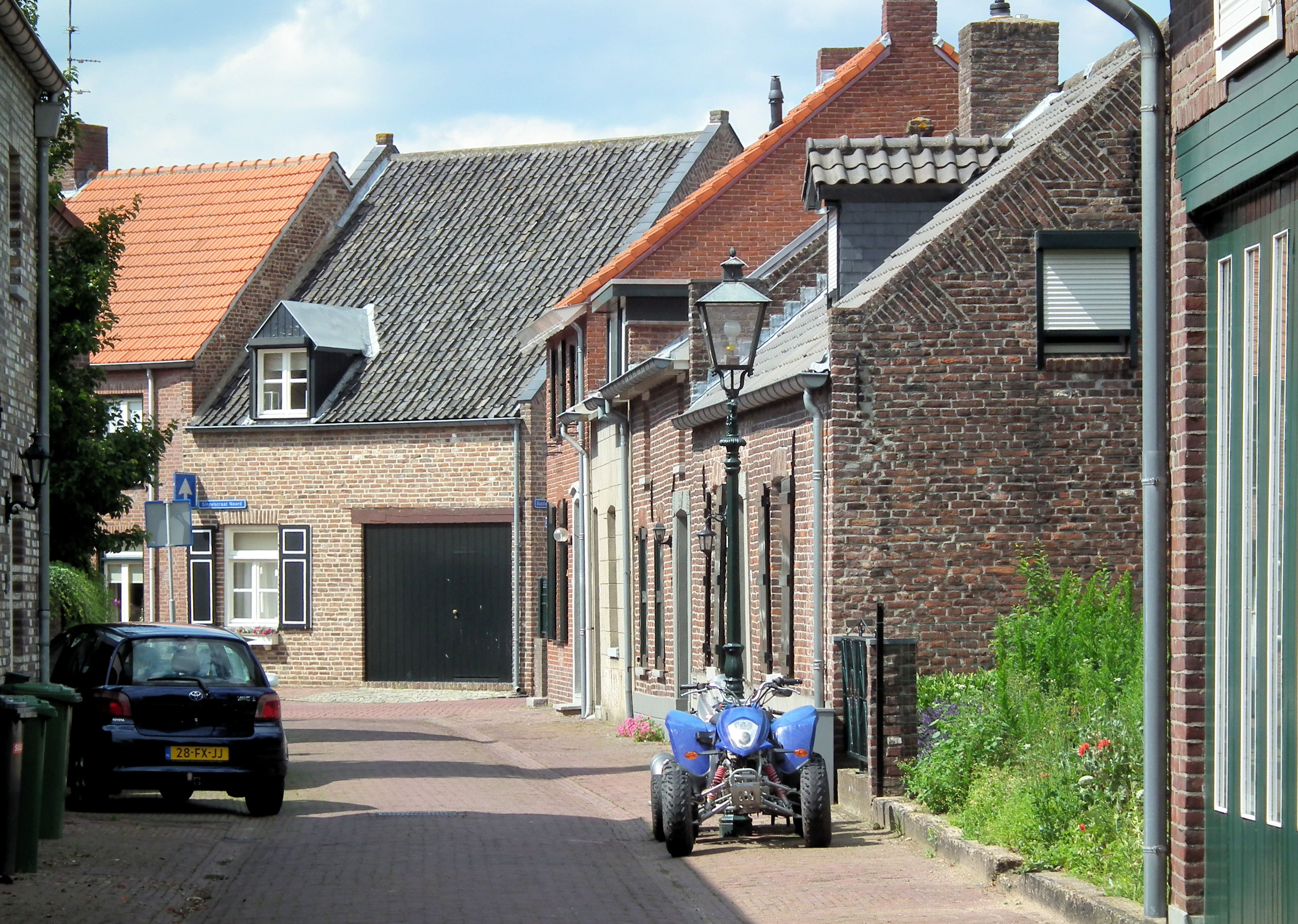
Street view

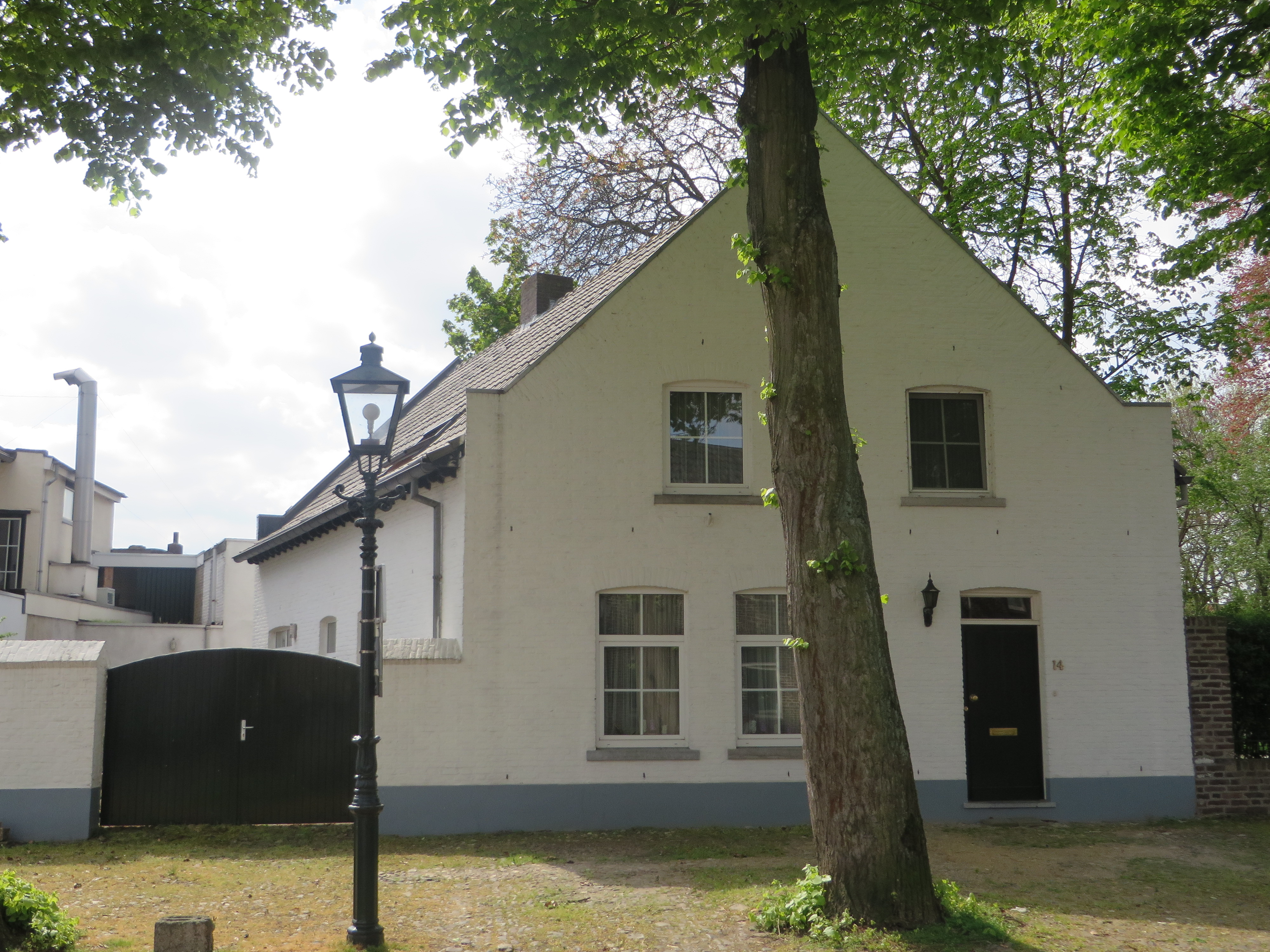
House in Stevensweert

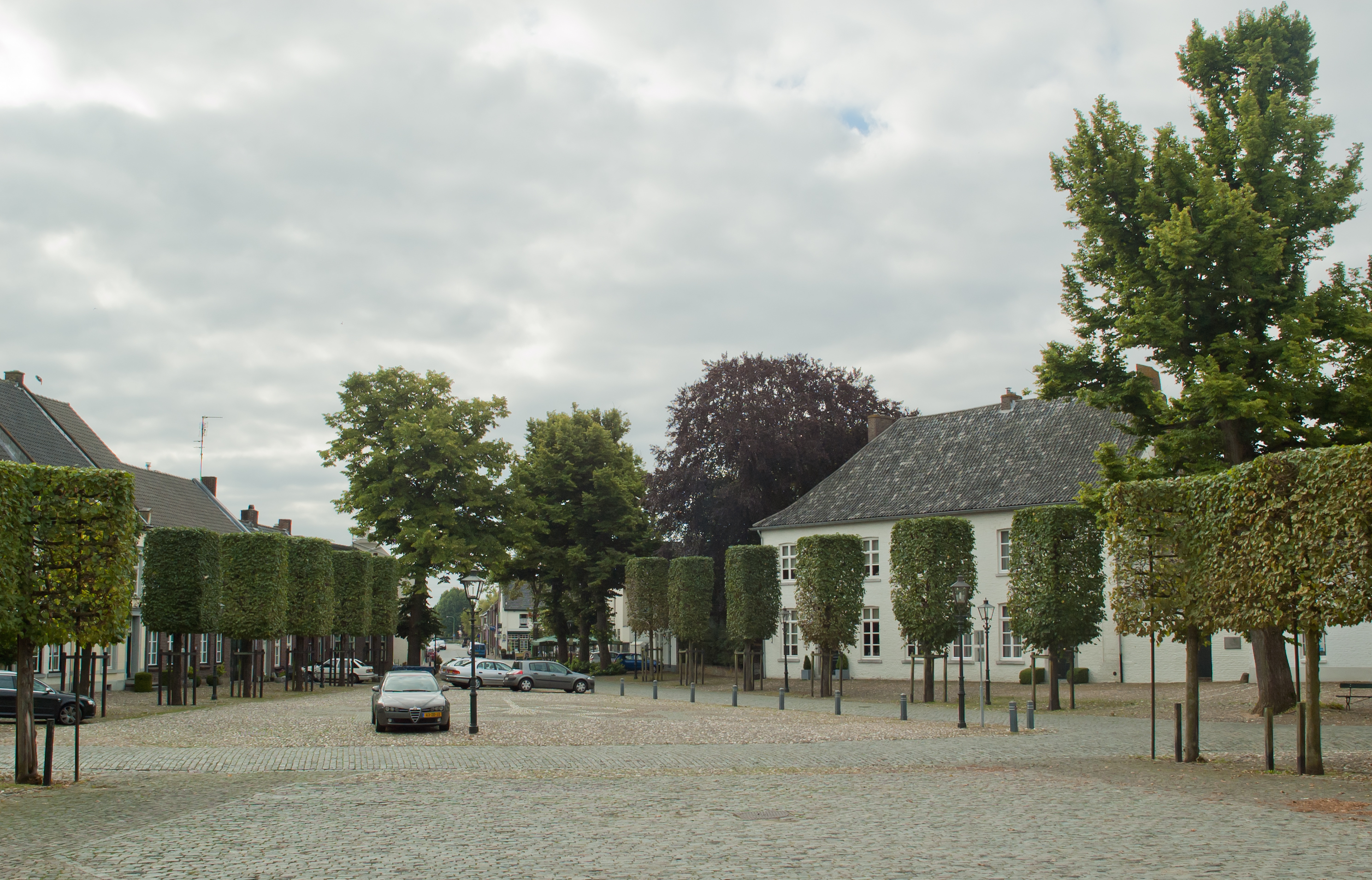
Square

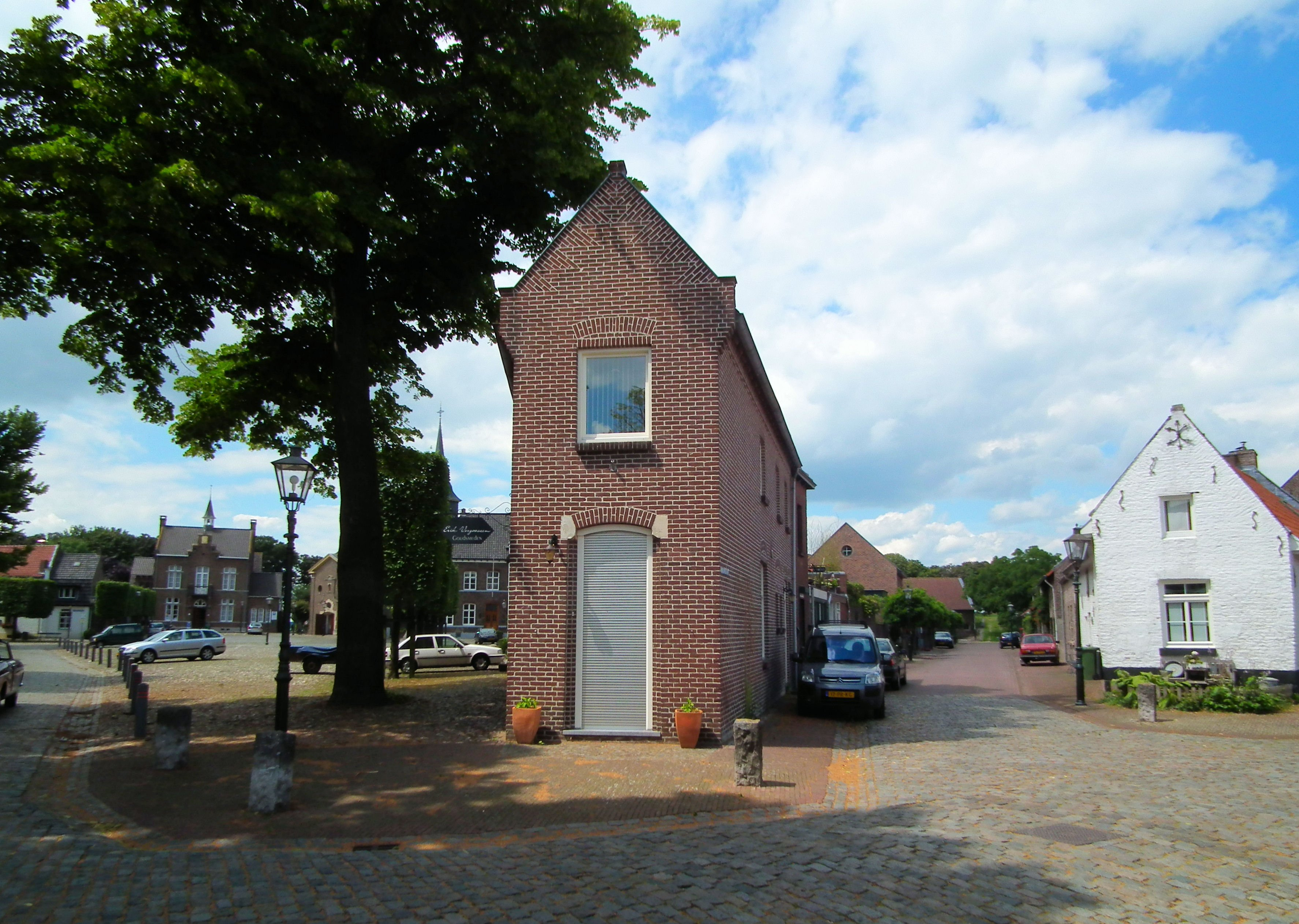
House in Stevensweert
