= Wessem =

- Small city
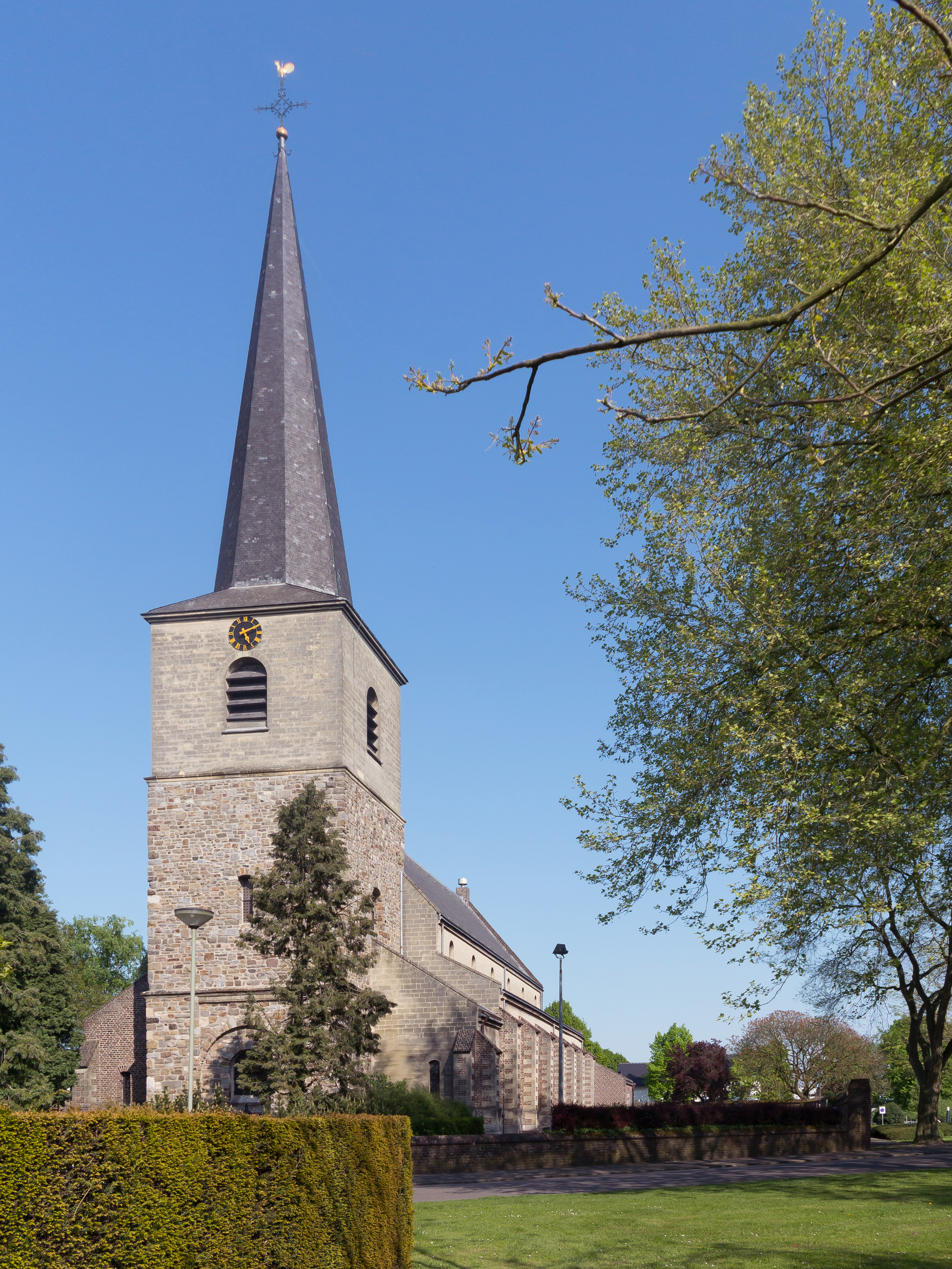
- The Medardus Church

- Flag Coat of arms

- Location in the Netherlands Location in the province of Limburg in the Netherlands
- Coordinates: 51°09′40″N 5°52′55″E
- Country: Netherlands
- Province: Limburg
- Municipality: Maasgouw

Area
  - Total: 5.37 km^{2} (2.07 sq mi)
- Elevation: 23 m (75 ft)

Population (2021)
  - Total: 2,030
  - Density: 378/km^{2} (979/sq mi)
- Time zone: UTC+1 (CET)
  - Summer (DST): UTC+2 (CEST)
- Postal code: 6019
- Dialing code: 0475
- Major roads: A2

Wessem is a small city in the Netherlands, in the province of Limburg. Wessem is a part of the municipality of Maasgouw (As of 1991). It received city rights around 1320.

== History ==
First mentioned in 965 as Wisheim, which means "good settlement", it received city rights around 1320.

Little is known about the early history. The name sounds Frankish and excavation show that it was inhabited in pre-Roman times. It was inhabited in that time by the Eburones, a Belgic tribe based on north-eastern Gaul in the 1st century BC. Julius Caesar described them as being of Germanic origin. They are believed to have lived between the rivers Meuse and Rhine. Ambiorix, an Eburonian chief, is known for having led a rebellion against the Romans in 54 BC. Because of this rebellion the Eburones were all but exterminated by the Romans and their land was destroyed. They were replaced by the Tungri, a Germanic tribe that was Celticised but in villages on the other side of the river Meuse the Eburones continued to exist what would explain the fact that the Limburgs language spoken on the west bank of the river Meuse still has some traces of the old Celtic language spoken by the Eburones.

The first written proof of Wessem's existence found, according to Baron Louis de Crassier in his Dictionnaire is in a Charter of 946, when Emperor Otto I confirmed to the abbey of Gembloux, the possession in Wessem of a mill and a brewery.

There was also a relationship with the abbey of St. Pantaleon in Cologne since bishop Bruno left all his assets, rights and possessions in the "hof Wessem" to the abbey in his last will and testament in 946.

In 946 Wessem acquired the right to make their own coins, collect taxes and to choose a guardian and a mayor. In the 12th century BC, Wessem received full city rights and from then on suffered the same fate as so many small communities in Limburg. Through marriages, agreements, war, and inheritances and legacies, Wessem was owned by one noble family after another. For example, in 1219 Willem I van Horn acquired Wessem as a guardian. The reign of the van Horne's lasted until 1568 when Philips van Montmorency together with Lamoraal van Egmond were decapitated in Brussels by Spanish noblemen.

In style with local customs at the time the executors received the victims' possessions and Wessem became Gelders. The Lords of Gelre en Gulick received all possessions of the Lords of Horne. Horn in contemporary Dutch and Hör in Limburgs, is still a small town very near to Wessem on the banks of the river Meuse and even the castle still exists and descendants of the noble family still live there.

In this period Wessem was a small town with fortifications. It had its own courtroom and jurisdiction, and being the main town in the Land van Horne (The land of the Lords of Horne), it had jurisdiction over most of the other towns in the Land van Horne.

In 1609 the confiscations granted to the lords of Gelre en Gulick expired. The princes of Chimay took possession of Wessem in 1620, a reign that would until the French Revolutionary Army arrived in 1790.

Situated strategically on the banks of the busy river Meuse and on most main roads in Limburg, Wessem's economy boomed in the 17th century. It was an important centre for trade and shipping. Relics from that time can still be seen in the form of big warehouses and storage-barns. The old city centre is well preserved and show Wessem's riches in those days.

The arrival of the French in 1790 preluded a harsh time for Wessem. The government and jurisdiction were changed at the will of the new rulers. The community had a love-hate relationship with the French Empire and flourished until in the years after the downfall of Emperor Napoleon I, Wessem became a part of the United Kingdom of the Netherlands, a status it still has nowadays with a short interval in the years 1830–1839, when it chose the side of the Belgians in their independence struggle against the Dutch. The Dutch occupied Wessem because of its strategic importance and Wessem became a part of the Netherlands.

Wessem was a separate municipality until 1991, when it was merged with Heel. Wessem had a quiet history, which can be seen by walking through the old centre which has streets paved with maaskeitjes (small square stones of which can be found in the river Meuse).

A must-see in Wessem is the former city hall with Wessems main square. A mosaic of maaskeitjes shows the city-crest. The Roman church, built in 964, was destroyed by the Germans in 1914, but has been restored to its former glory.

Wessem has a sjutterie (schutterij in Dutch, Schützenverein in German), a club of riflemen. They participate in the OLS (Old Limburgs rifleshooting-fair), an annual cultural event for Limburgian-people from every country where every Limburgian village sends a delegation, every year. In 2004 they won the OLS, and in 2005 they organised it.

The table tennis club (Westa), the soccer club (R.K.S.V.W.) and the volleyball team (VC Maasdal) belong to the top in the Netherlands.

== Gallery ==
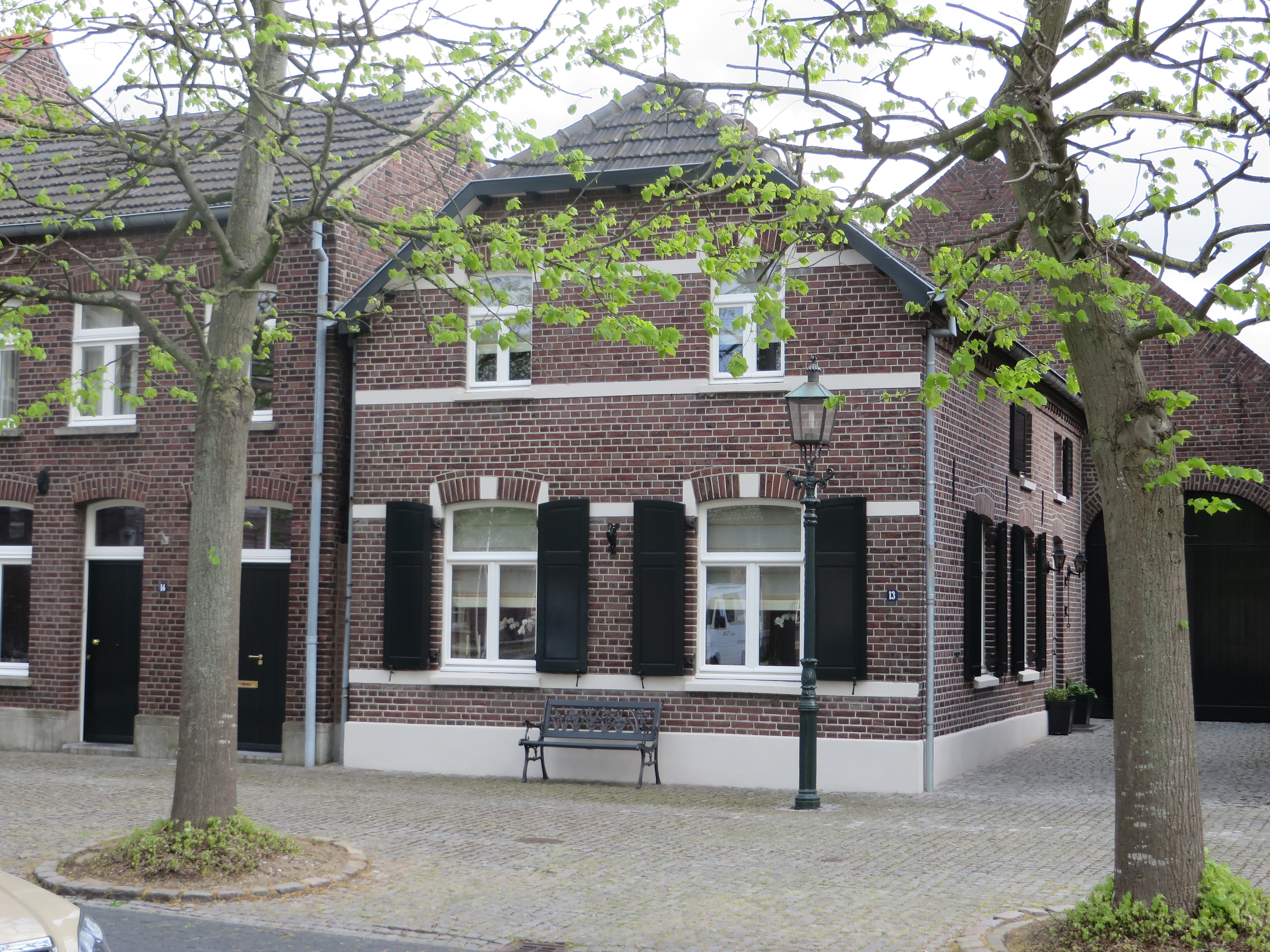
House in Wessem

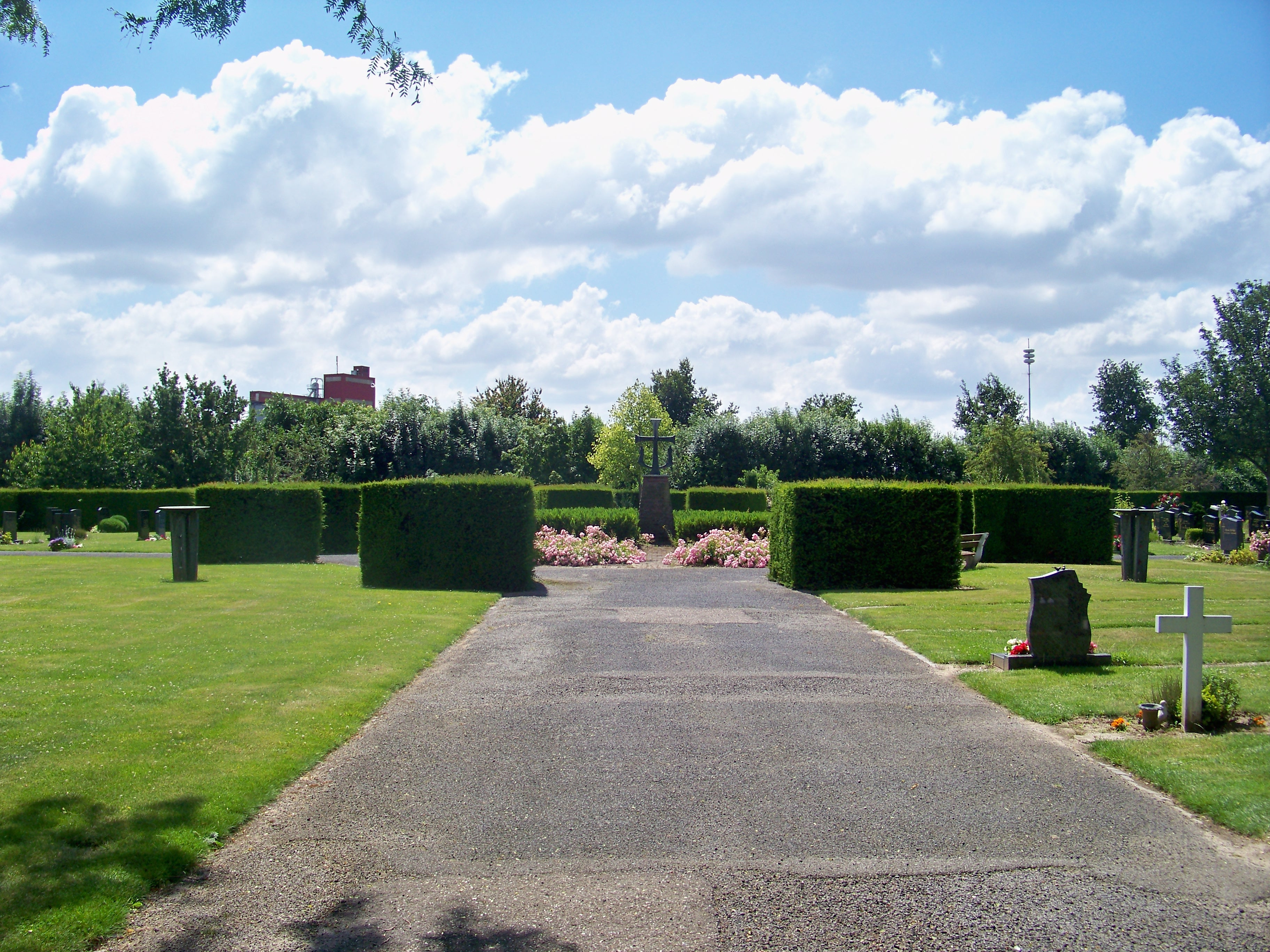
Cemetery in Wessem

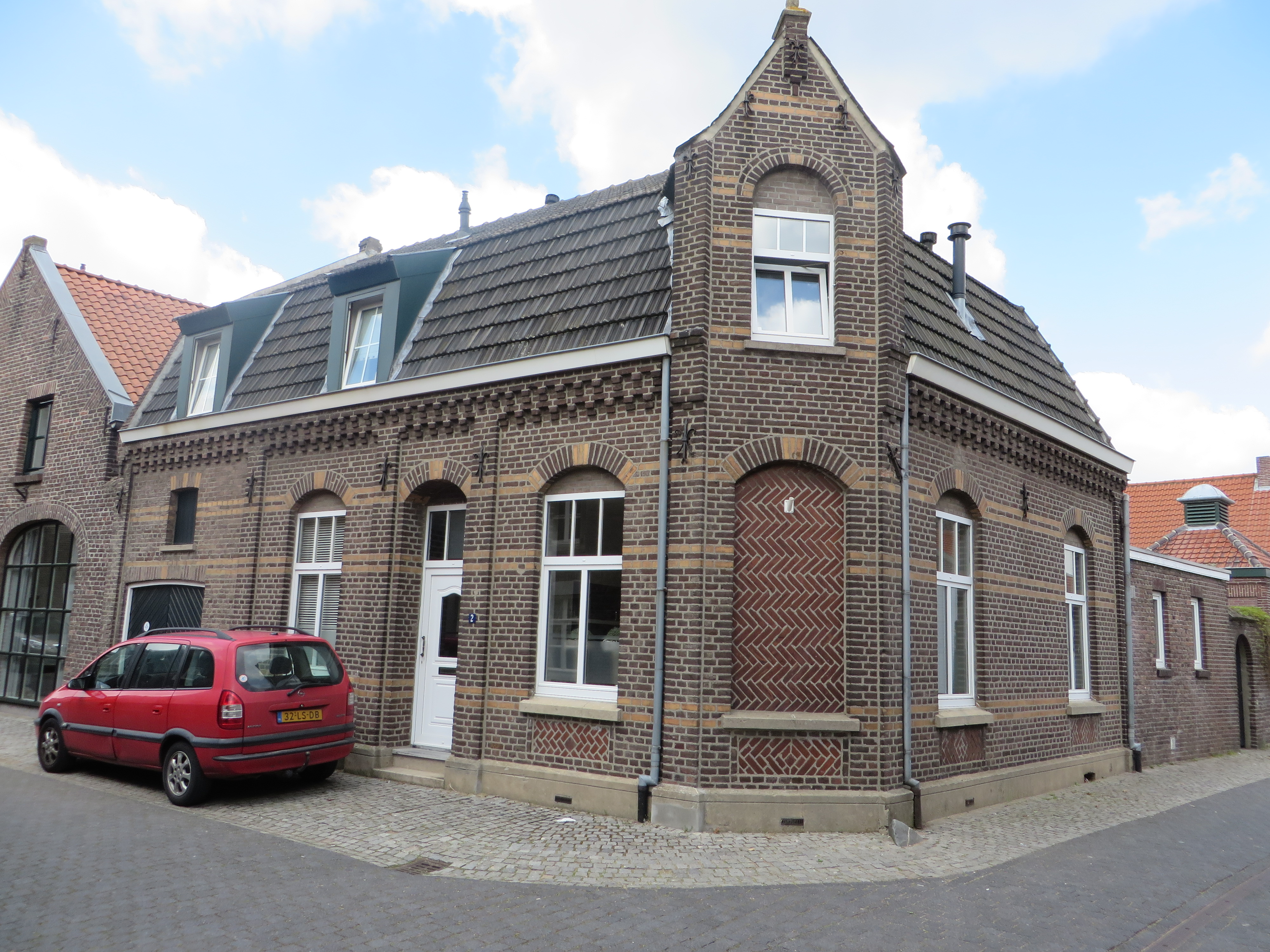
House in Wessem

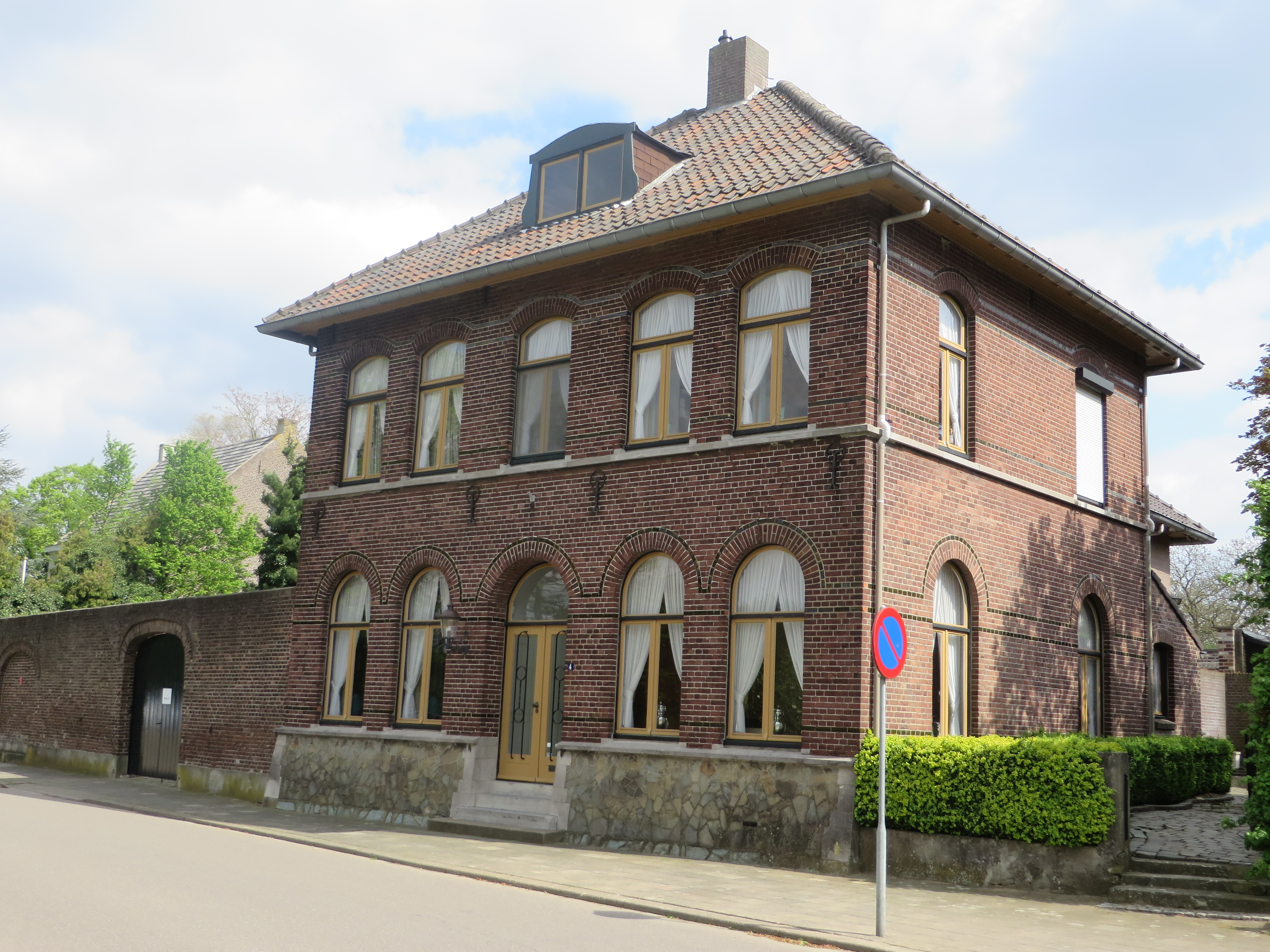
House in Wessem
