= Linne =

- Village
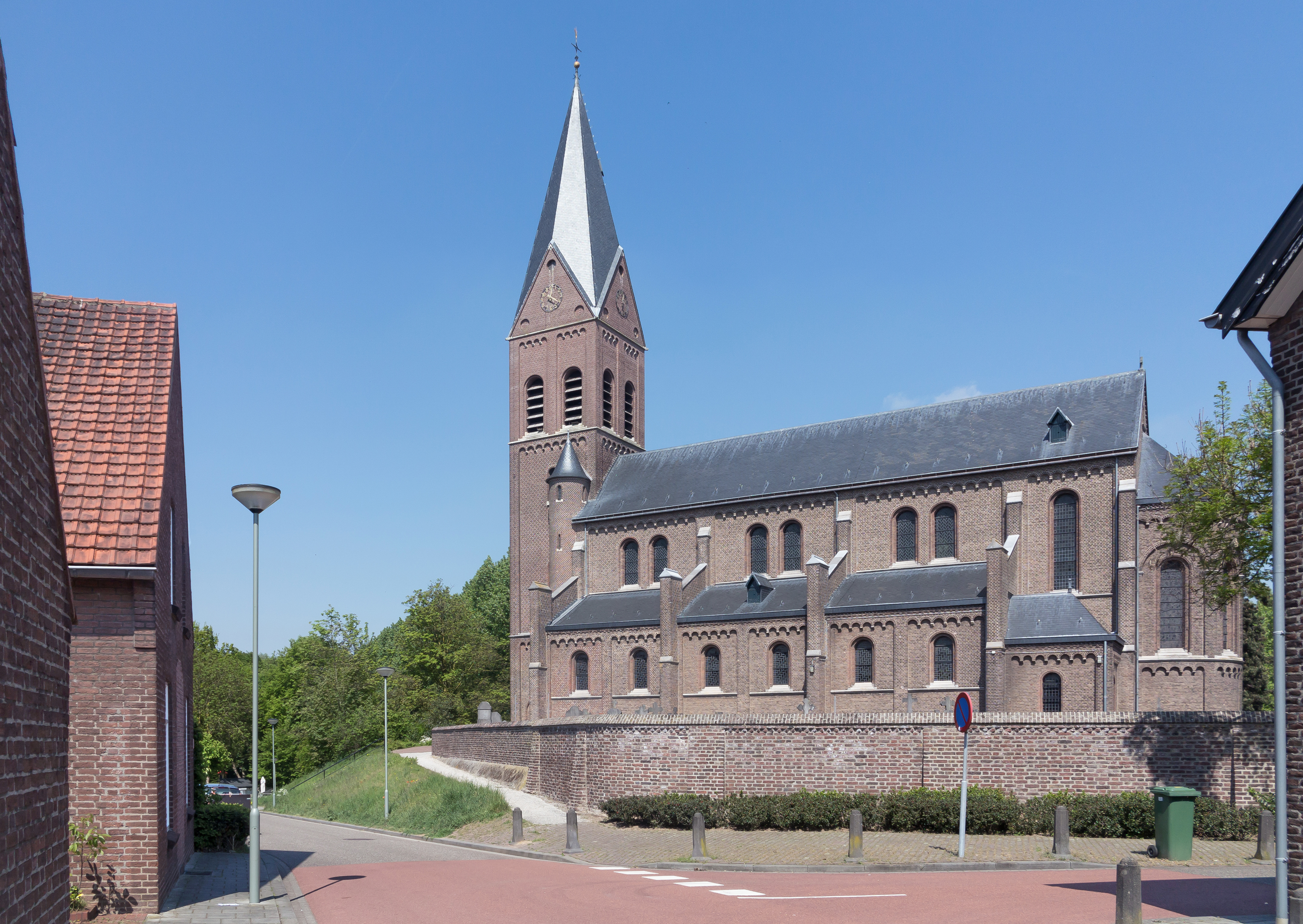
- St Martinus Church

- Location in the Netherlands Location in the province of Limburg in the Netherlands
- Coordinates: 51°9′N 5°56′E
- Country: Netherlands
- Province: Limburg
- Municipality: Maasgouw

Area
  - Total: 3.97 km^{2} (1.53 sq mi)
- Elevation: 28 m (92 ft)

Population (2021)
  - Total: 3,680
  - Density: 927/km^{2} (2,400/sq mi)
- Time zone: UTC+1 (CET)
  - Summer (DST): UTC+2 (CEST)
- Postal code: 6067
- Dialing code: 0475
- Major roads: A73

Linne is a village in the Dutch province of Limburg. It is a part of the municipality of Maasgouw, and lies about 6 km southwest of Roermond.

== History ==
The village was first mentioned in 943 as Linne. The etymology is unclear. Linne developed in the Early Middle Ages along the Maas. It used to be part of Ambt Montfort. In 1716, it became part of the Dutch Republic.

The Catholic St Martinus Church is a three aisled basilica-like church built in 1897 to replace the medieval church. The tower was blown up in 1945, and restored between 1950 and 1951. In 1993, it received a copy of its original crown after the 1992 earthquake.

Linne was home to 621 people in 1840. In January 1945, Linne was liberated from German occupation within the scope of 'Operation Blackcock'.

Linne was a separate municipality until 1991, when it was merged with Maasbracht. In 1992, the village which was hit by an earthquake with a magnitude of 5.5 on the Richter scale. Many buildings were damaged, but there were only 15 wounded. In 2007, it became part of the municipality of Maasgouw.

== Gallery ==
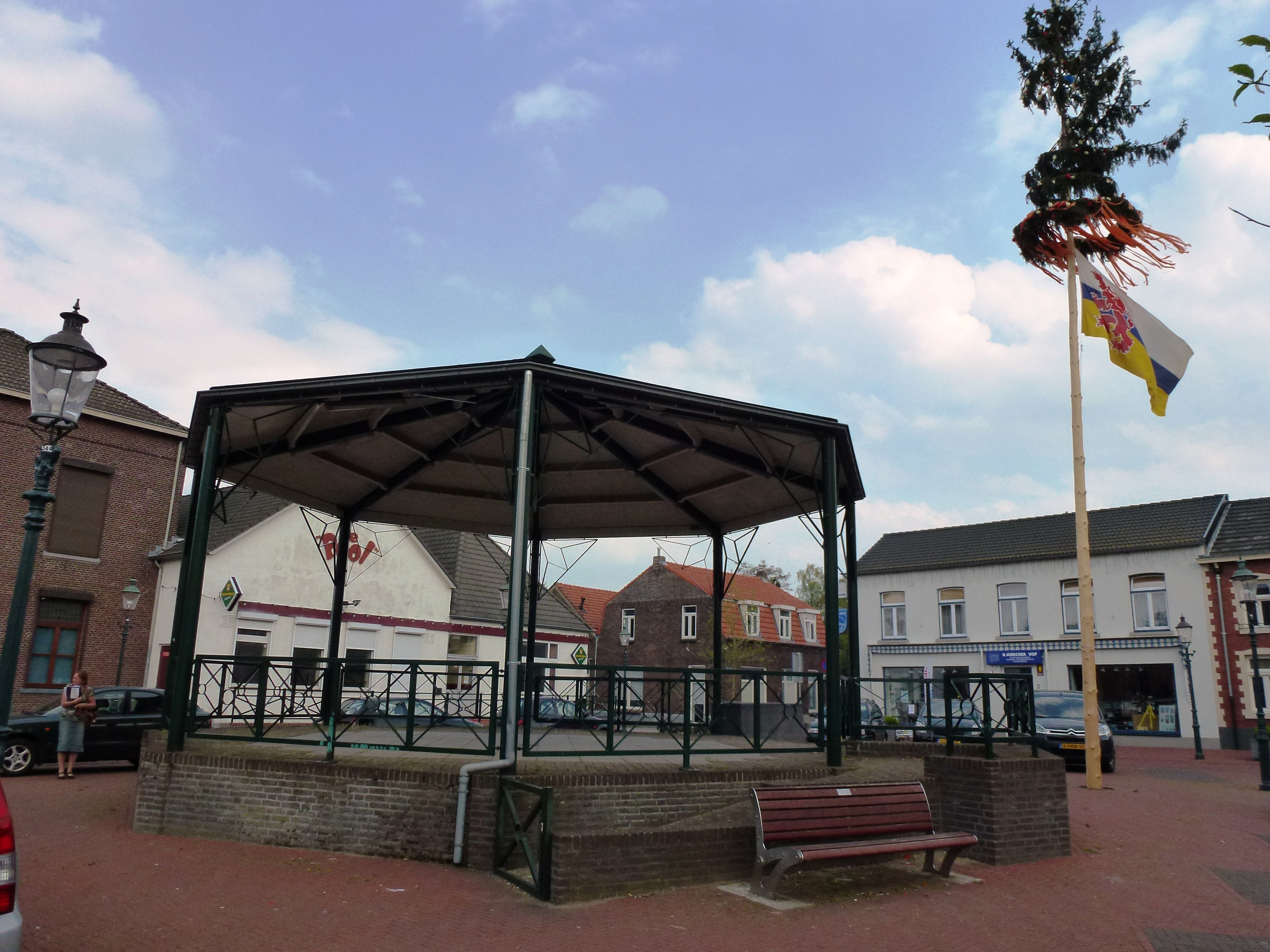
Bandstand

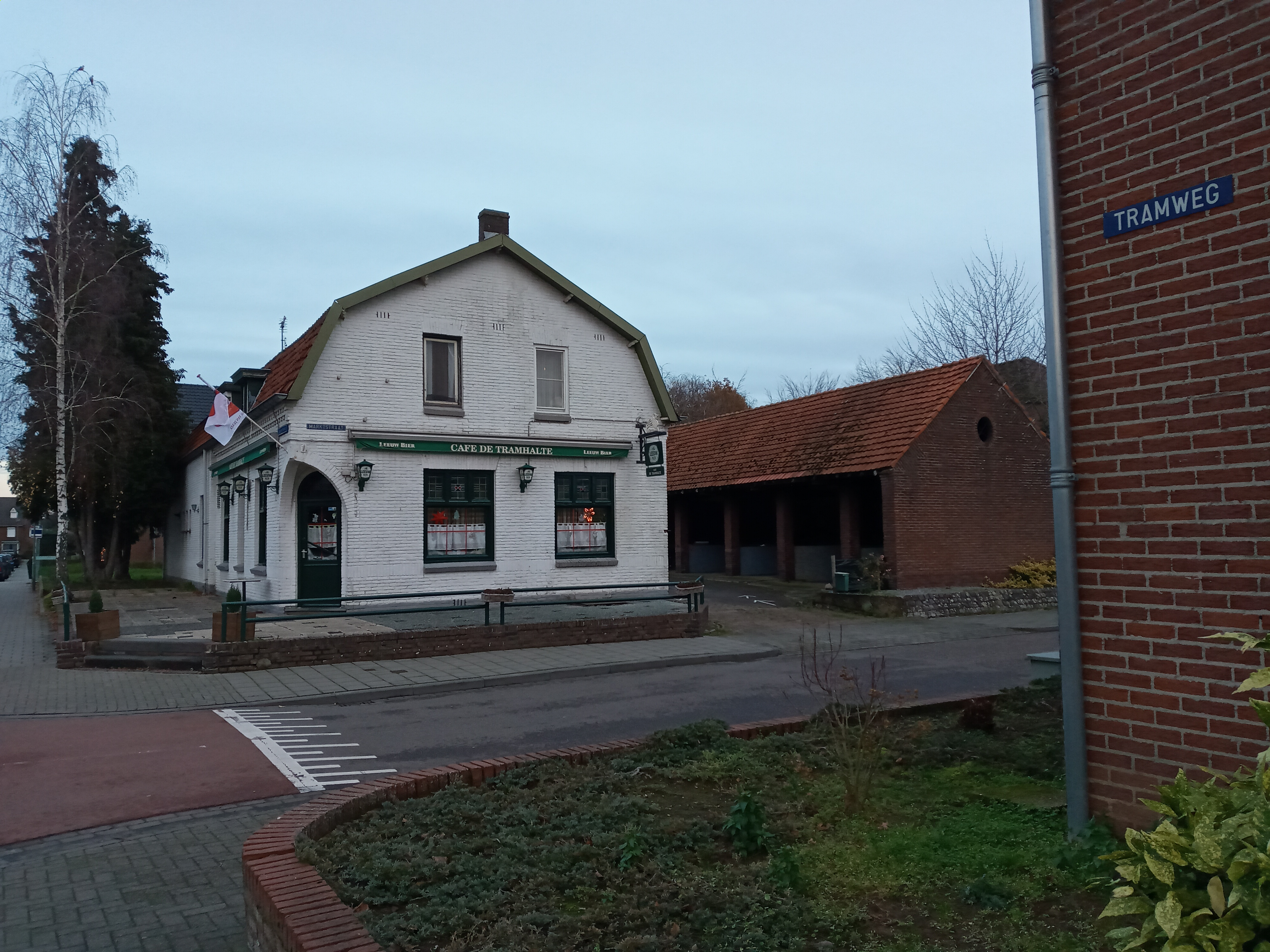
Pub de Tramhalte

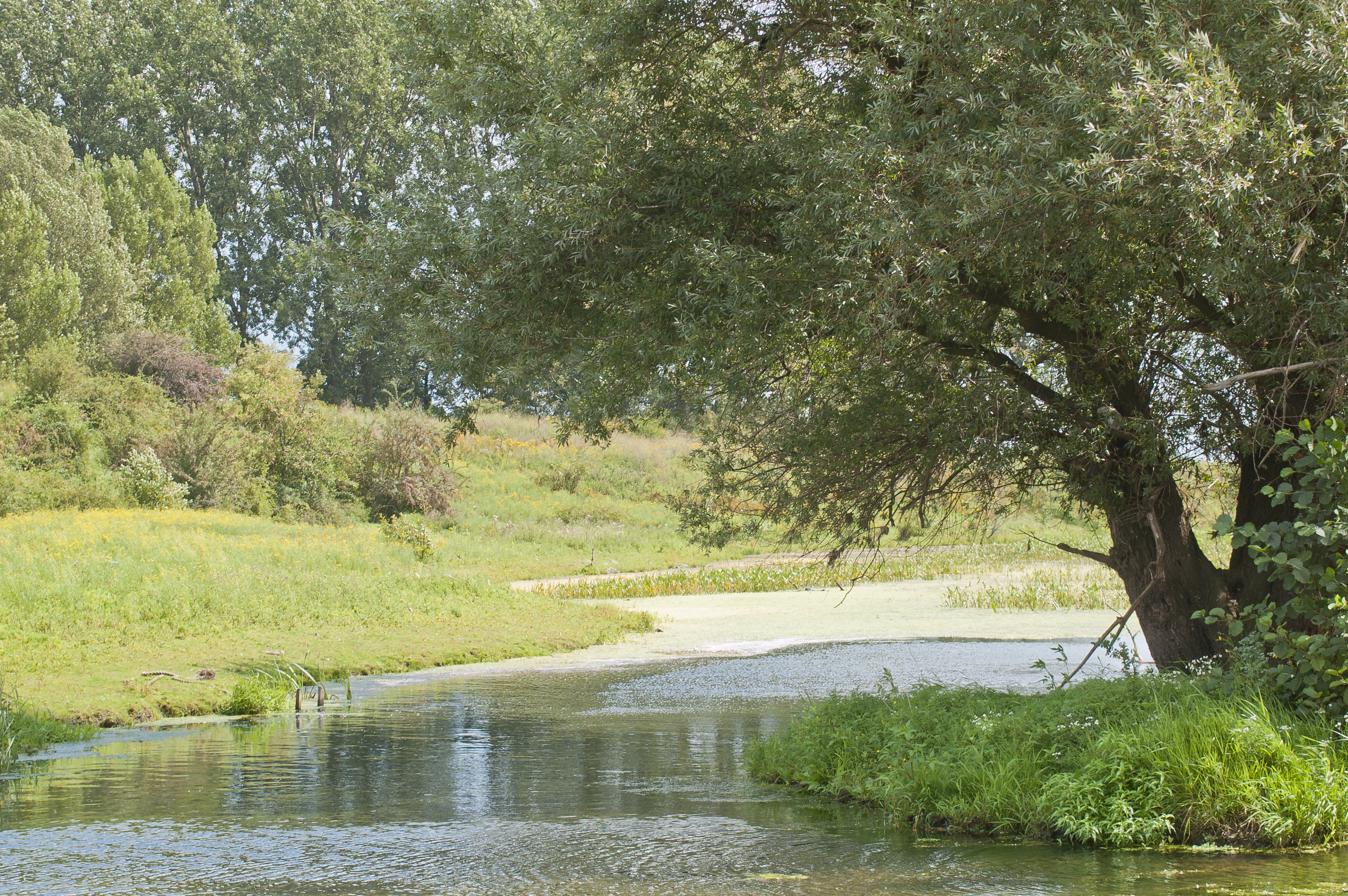
Nature near Linne

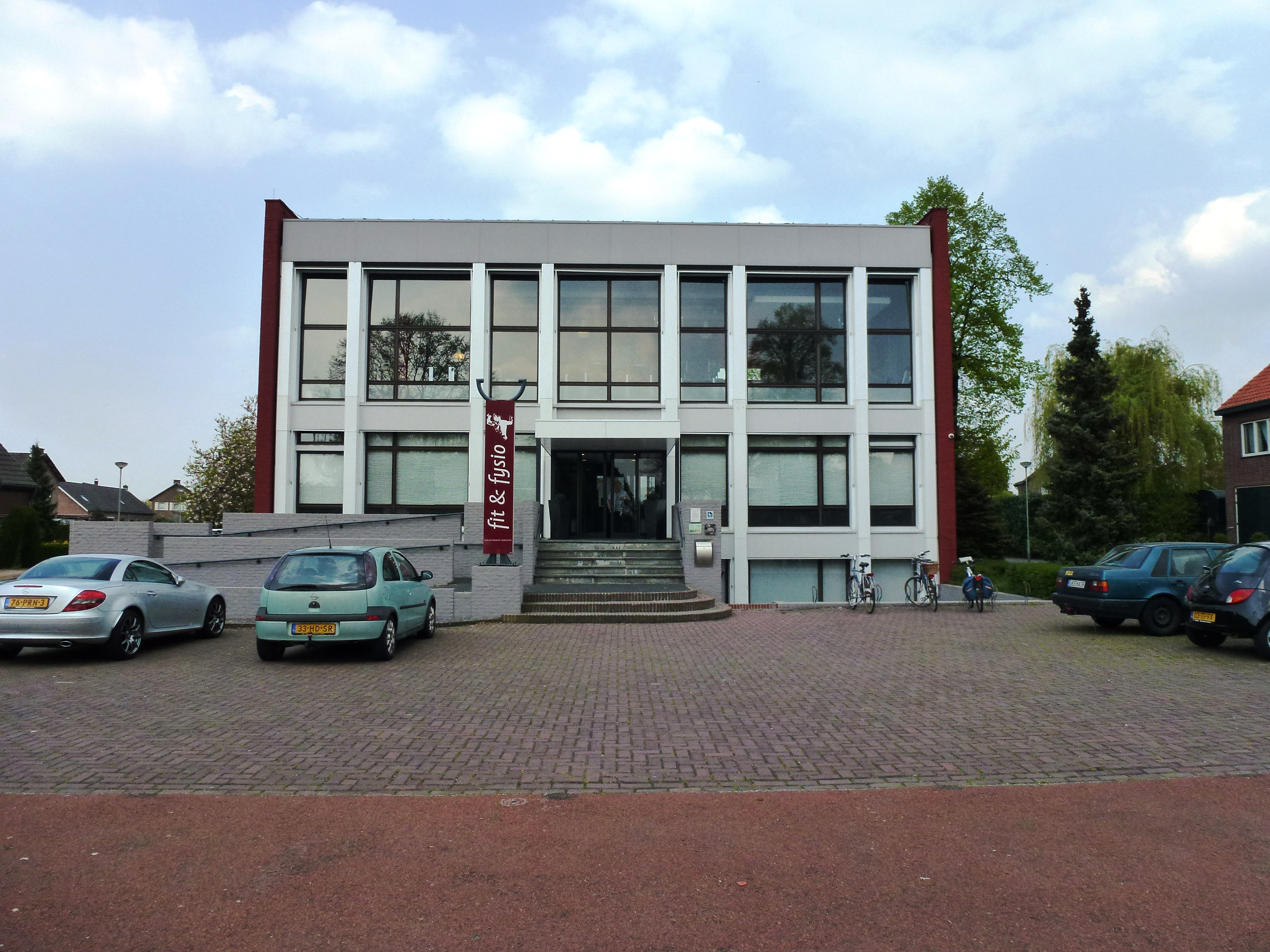
Former town hall
