= Heel, Netherlands =

Heel Hael
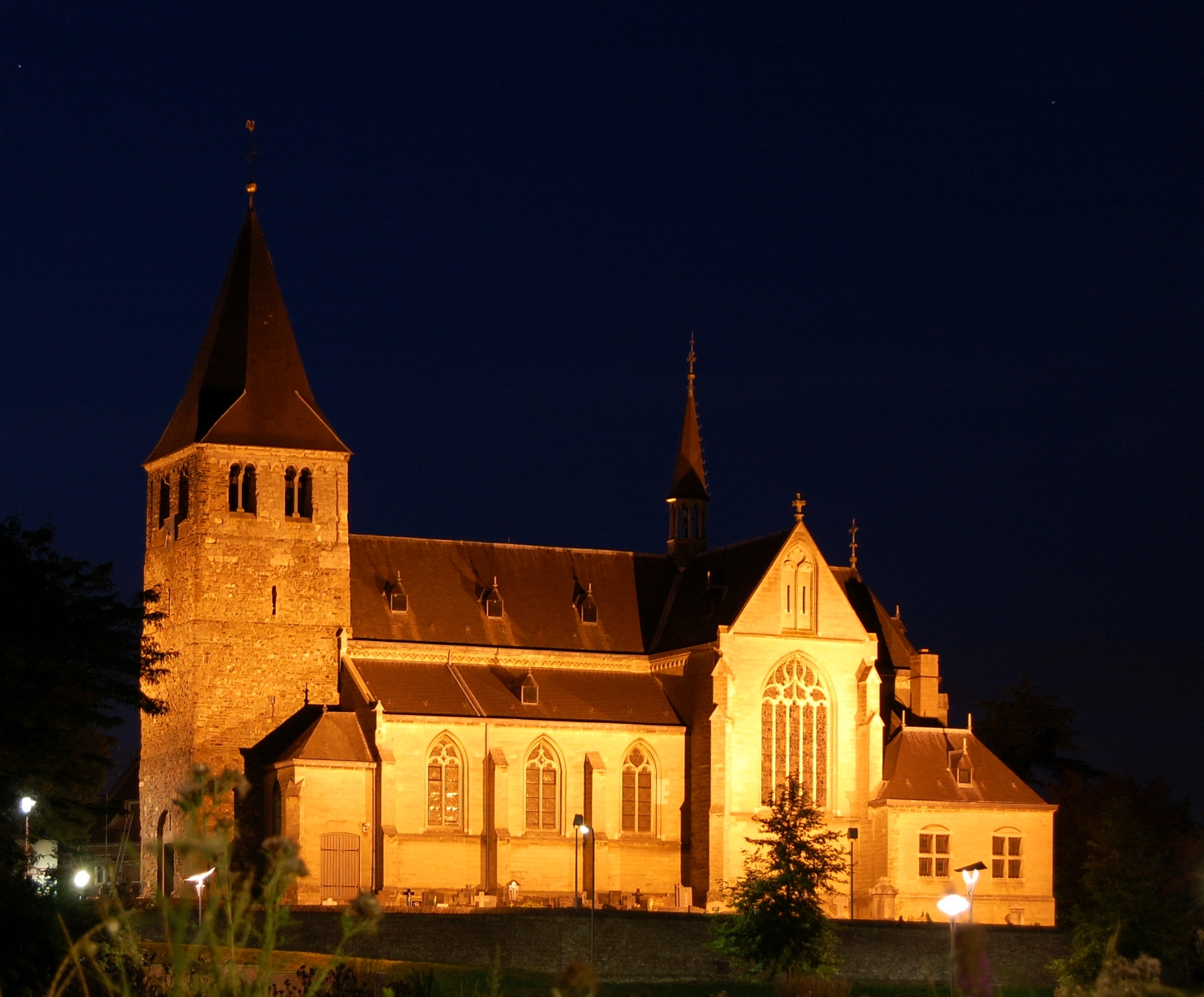
- St. Stephanus church

- Flag

- Location in the Netherlands Location in the province of Limburg in the Netherlands
- Coordinates: 51°10′N 5°53′E
- Country: Netherlands
- Province: Limburg
- Municipality: Maasgouw

Area
  - Total: 10.47 km^{2} (4.04 sq mi)
- Elevation: 24 m (79 ft)

Population (2021)
  - Total: 4,225
  - Density: 403.5/km^{2} (1,045/sq mi)
- Time zone: UTC+1 (CET)
  - Summer (DST): UTC+2 (CEST)
- Postal code: 6097
- Dialing code: 0475

Heel (Dutch: [ɦeːl]; Limburgish: Hael) is a village and former municipality in the southeastern Netherlands. The village is located near the E25 motorway and the river Meuse.

== History ==
In pre-Roman times, this was the location of the Gallic town of Catualium.

In 1821, the municipality of Pol en Panheel, covering the village of Panheel and the hamlet Pol, merged with Heel to form a municipality called Heel en Panheel. In 1991, it was renamed simply Heel. On January 1, 2007, the municipality of Heel was merged into the municipality of Maasgouw.

== Surrounding area ==
Major cities in the surrounding areas are;

- Roermond (Northeast, 10 kilometers)
- Maastricht (South, 45 kilometers)
- Eindhoven (Northwest, 50 kilometers)

== Notable people ==
- Lies Visschedijk (born 1974), actress
- Jesse Huta Galung (born 1985), tennis player

== Gallery ==
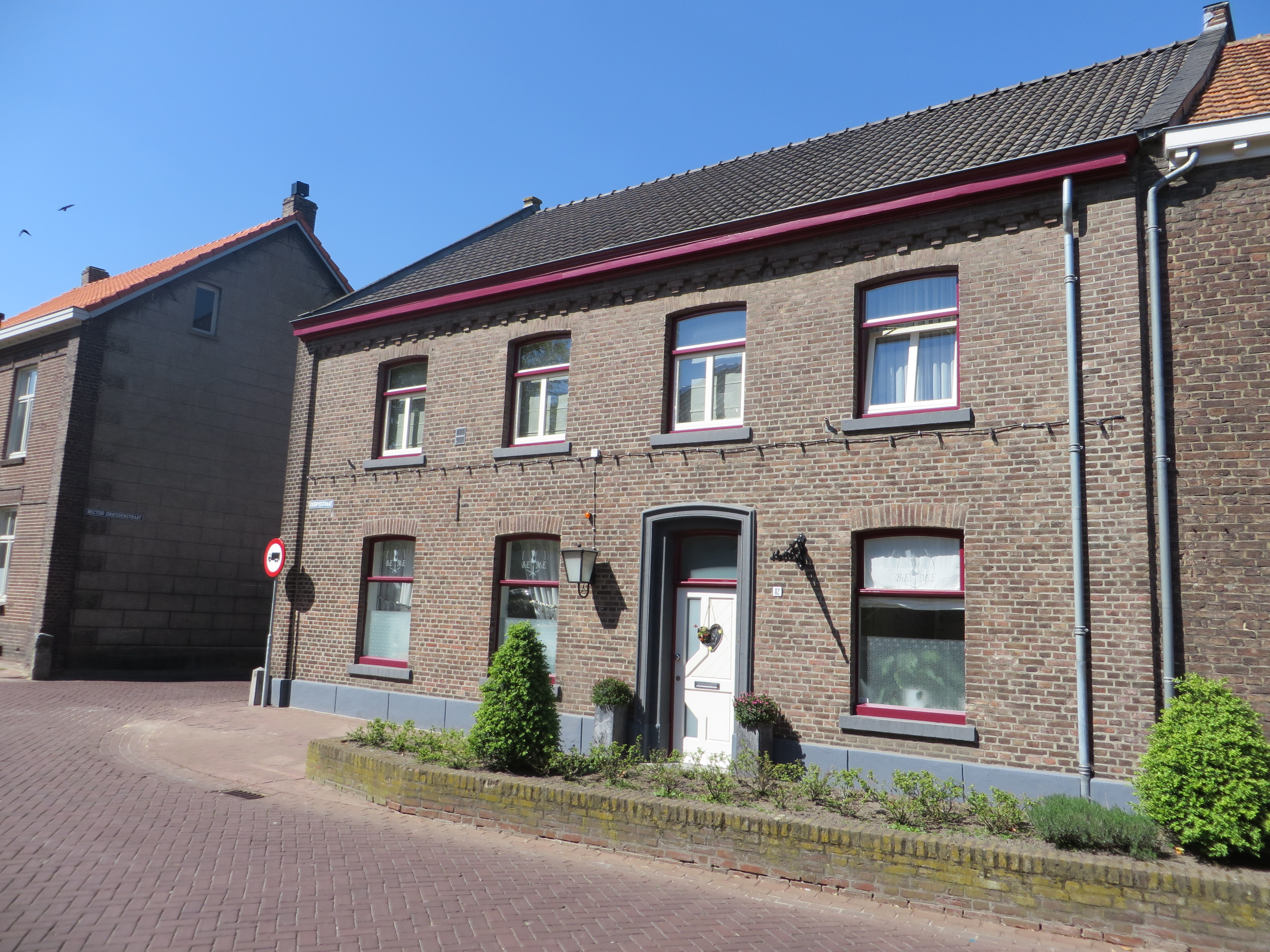
House in Heel

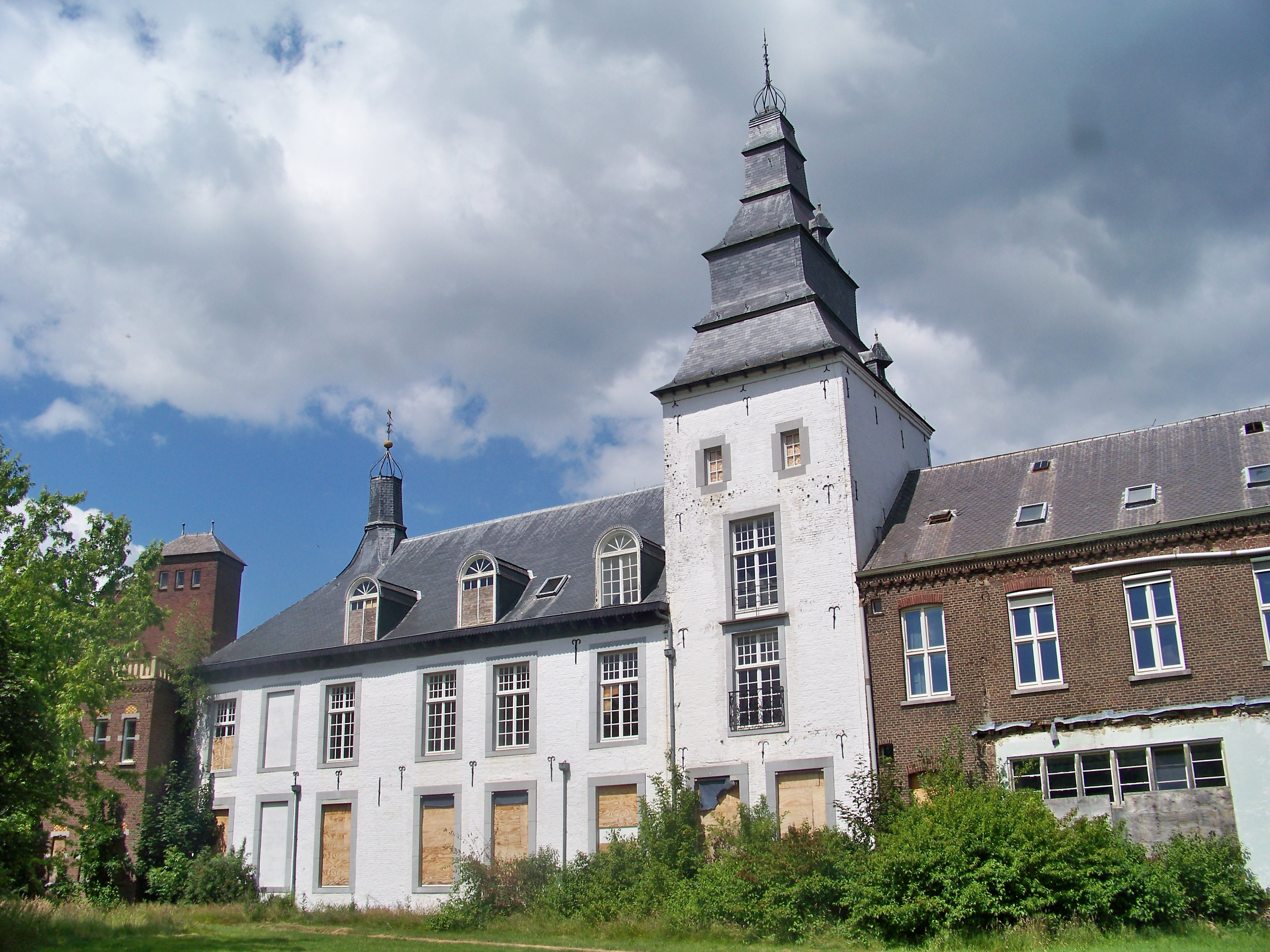
Building in Heel

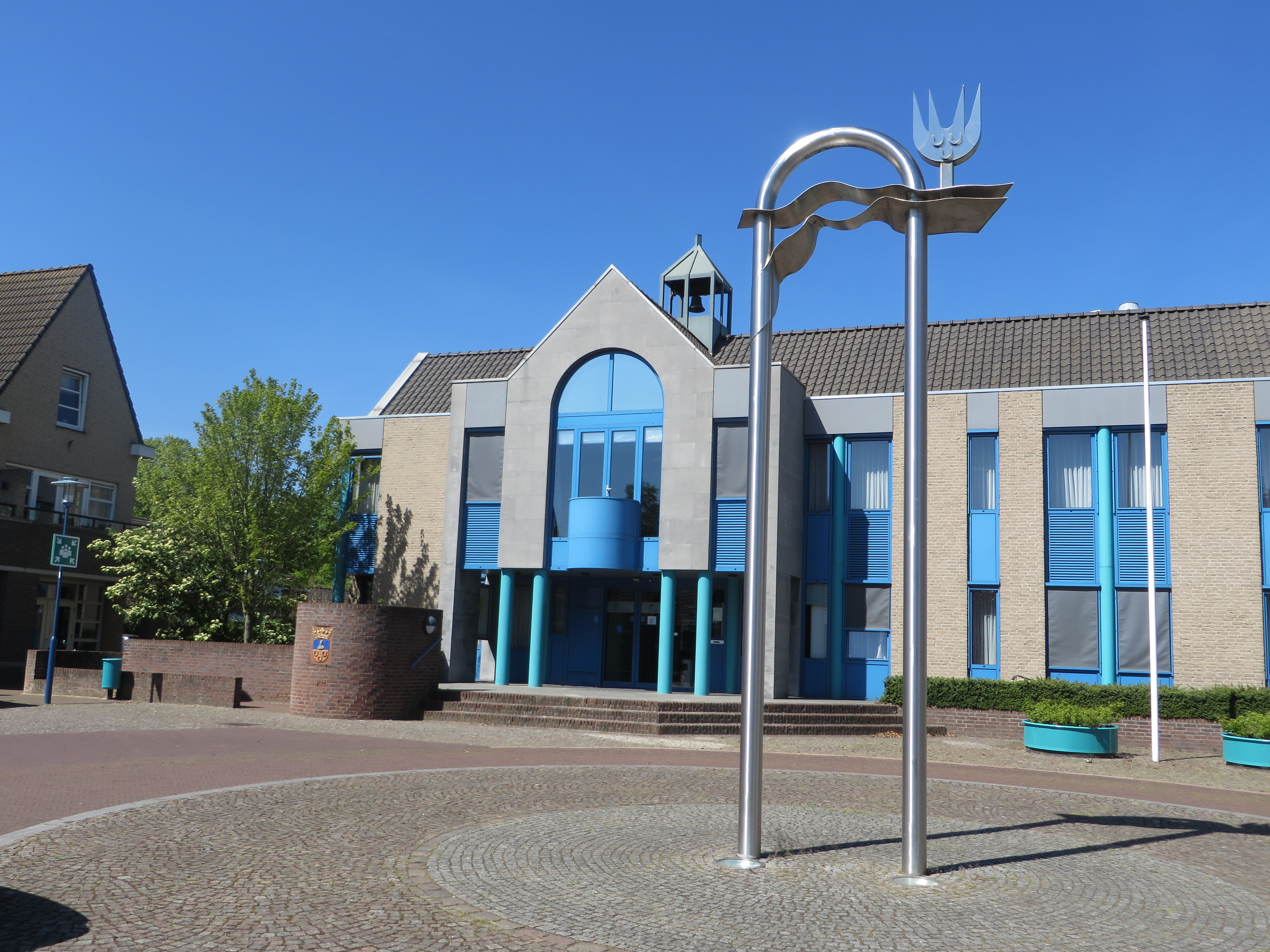
Former town hall

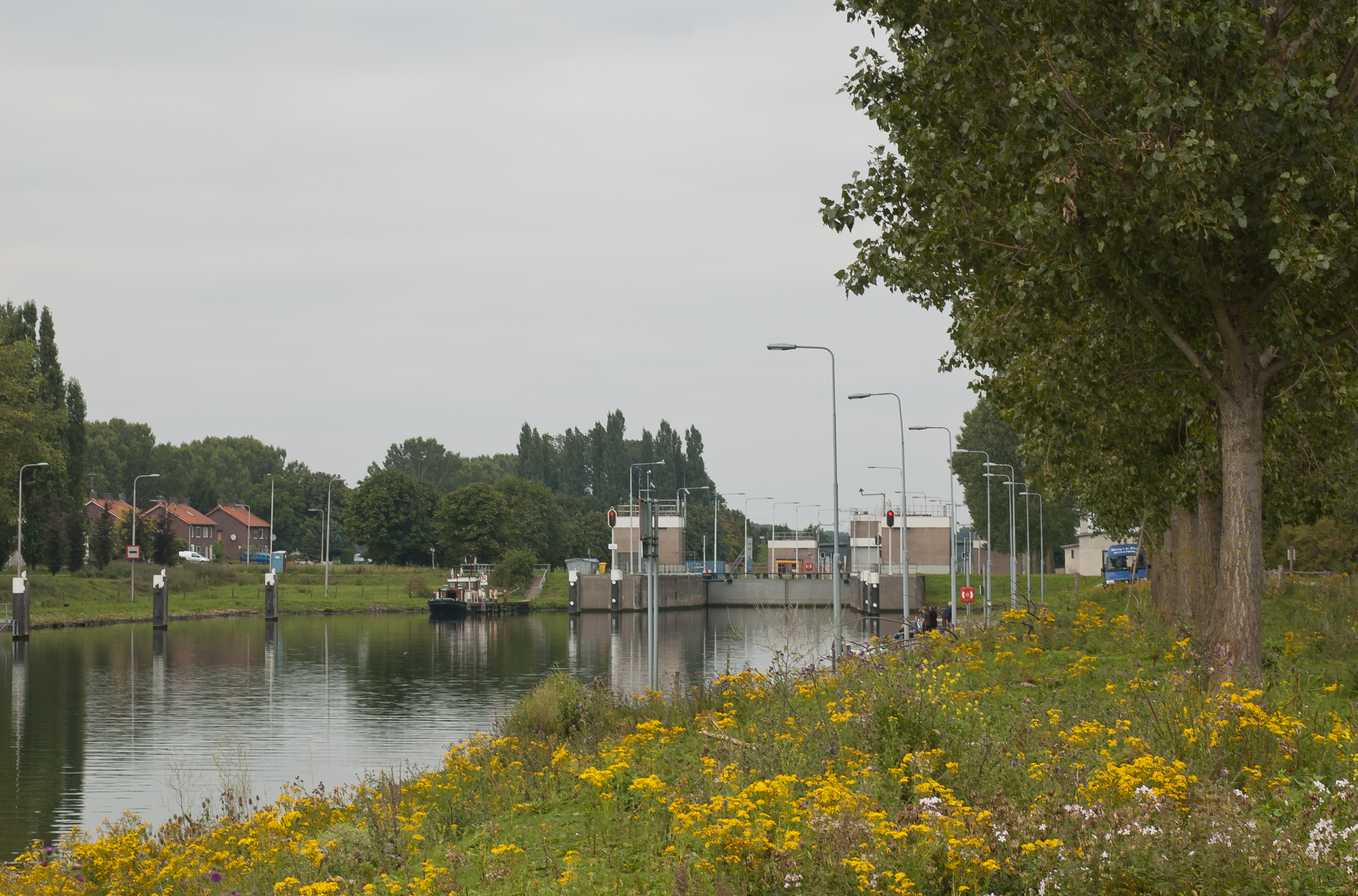
Canal view
