= Panheel =

Panheel Panhael
- Village
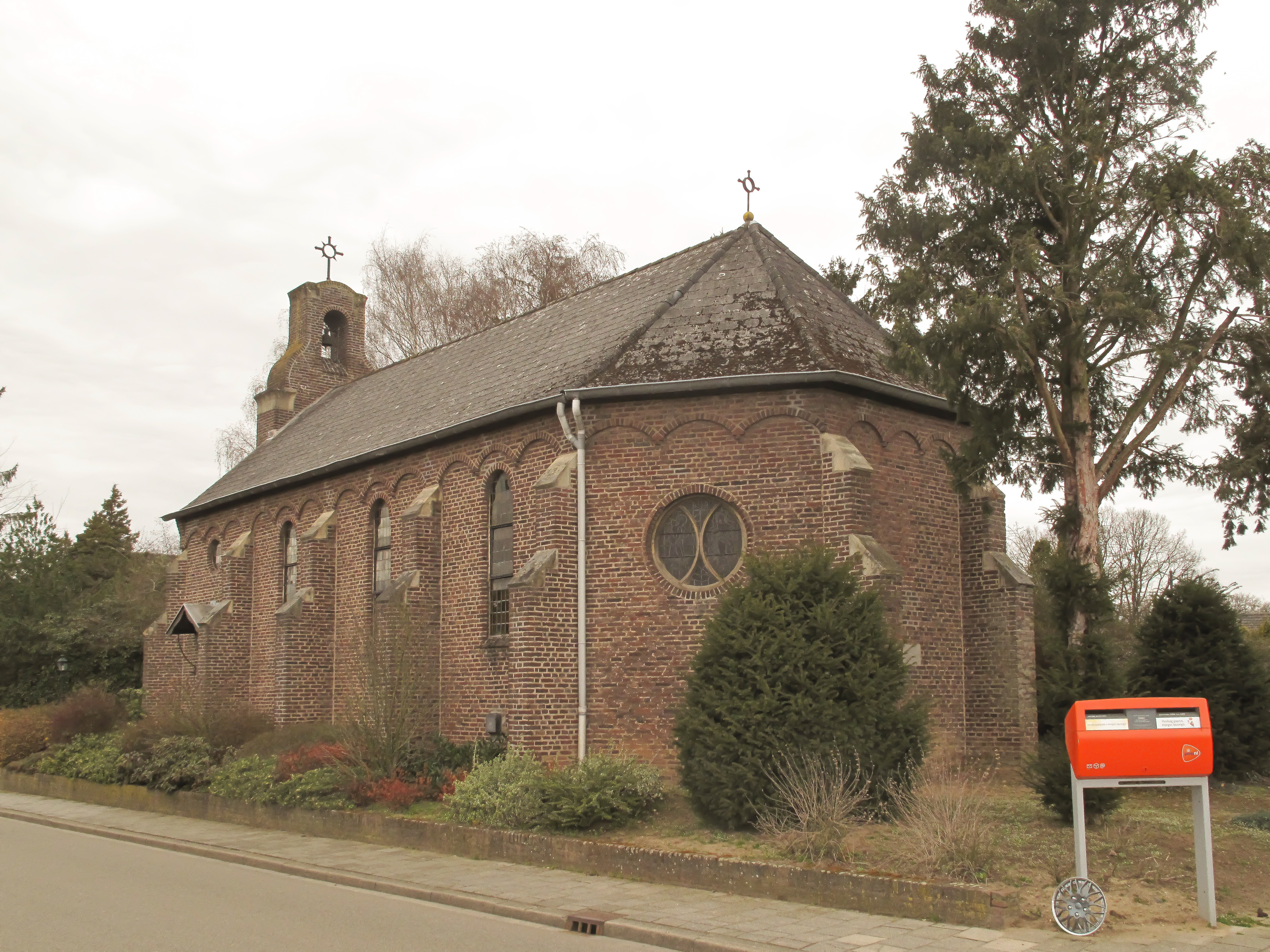
- Onze Lieve Vrouwe van 't Hart Chapel

- Flag

- Location in the Netherlands Location in the province of Limburg in the Netherlands
- Coordinates: 51°11′N 5°52′E
- Country: Netherlands
- Province: Limburg
- Municipality: Maasgouw

Area
  - Total: 1.19 km^{2} (0.46 sq mi)
- Elevation: 24 m (79 ft)

Population (2021)
  - Total: 225
  - Density: 189/km^{2} (490/sq mi)
- Time zone: UTC+1 (CET)
  - Summer (DST): UTC+2 (CEST)
- Postal code: 6097
- Dialing code: 0475

Panheel is a village in the Dutch province of Limburg. It is a part of the municipality of Maasgouw, and lies about 9 km south-west of Roermond.

The village was first mentioned in 1417 or 1418 as Panhedel. The etymology is unclear.

Panheel was home to 175 people in 1840. In 1875, a chapel was built. Panheel was never elevated to a parish, however it is considered a village by the municipality.

The Boschmolenplas is a lake which formed as a result of gravel excavation. It has a diameter of 1 kilometre (0.62 mi) and has clear water with a visibility of 12 metres. It is therefore, a popular diving spot.

== Gallery ==
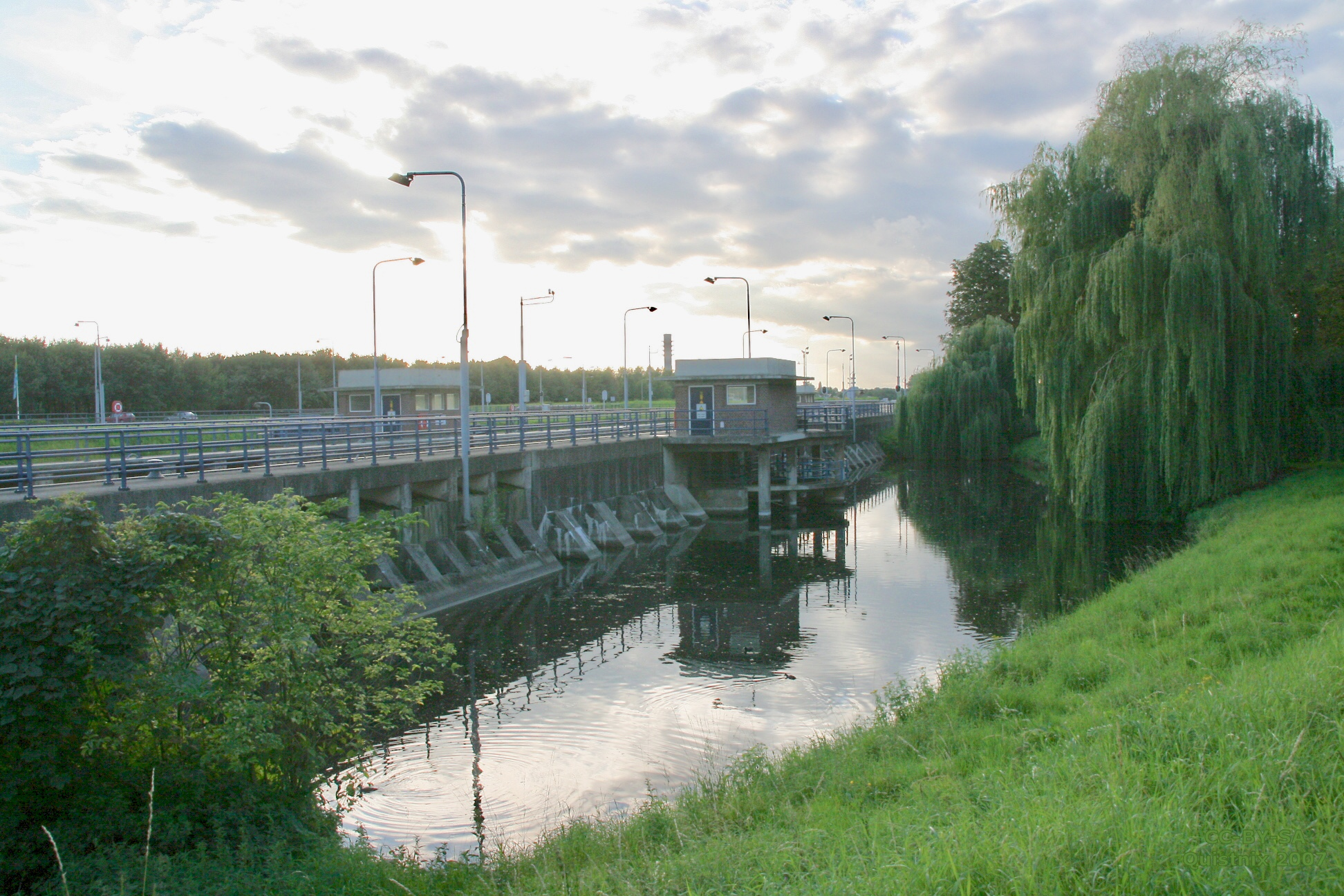
Lock near Panheel

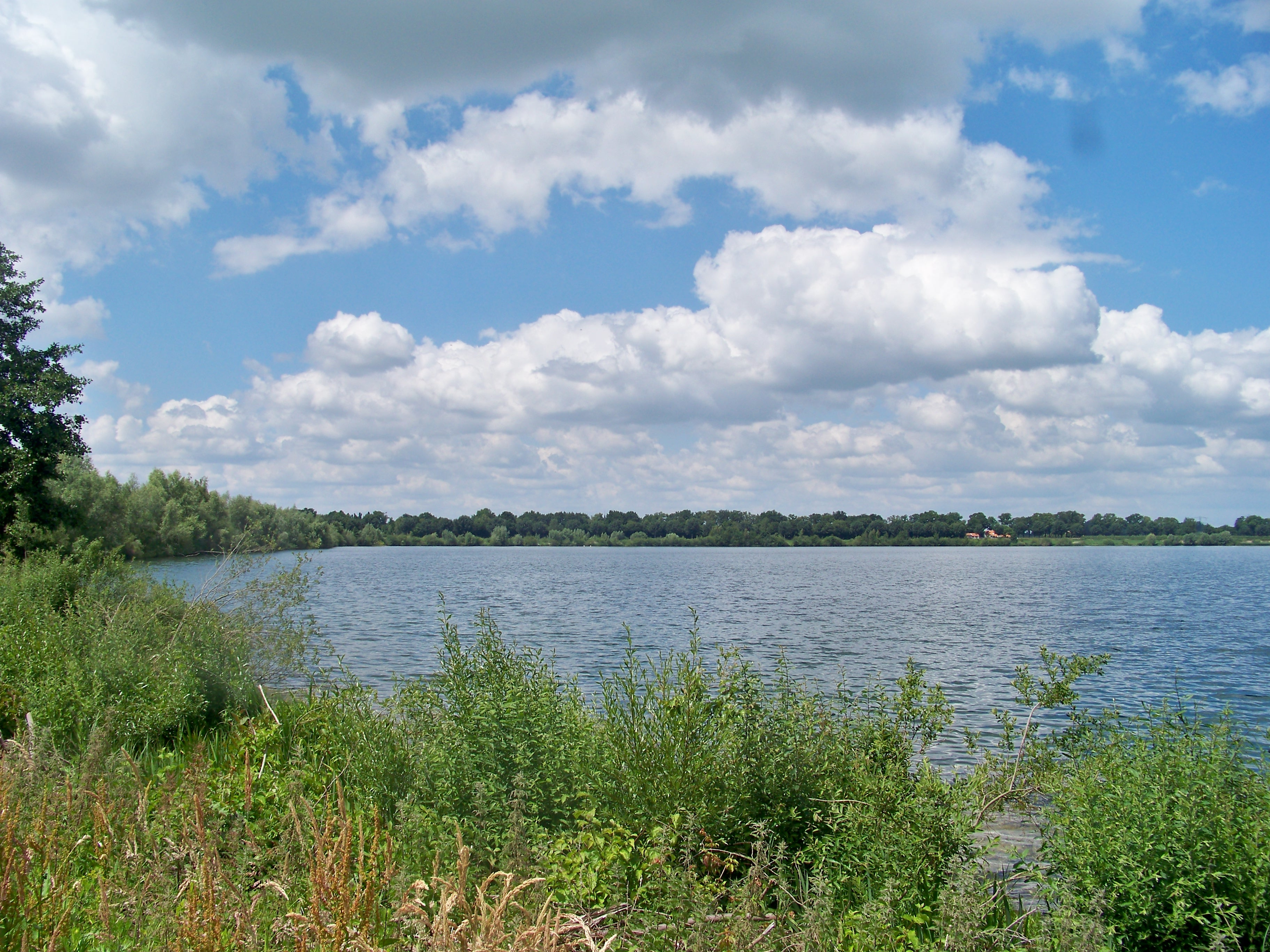
Boschmolenplas
