= Ohé en Laak =

- Village
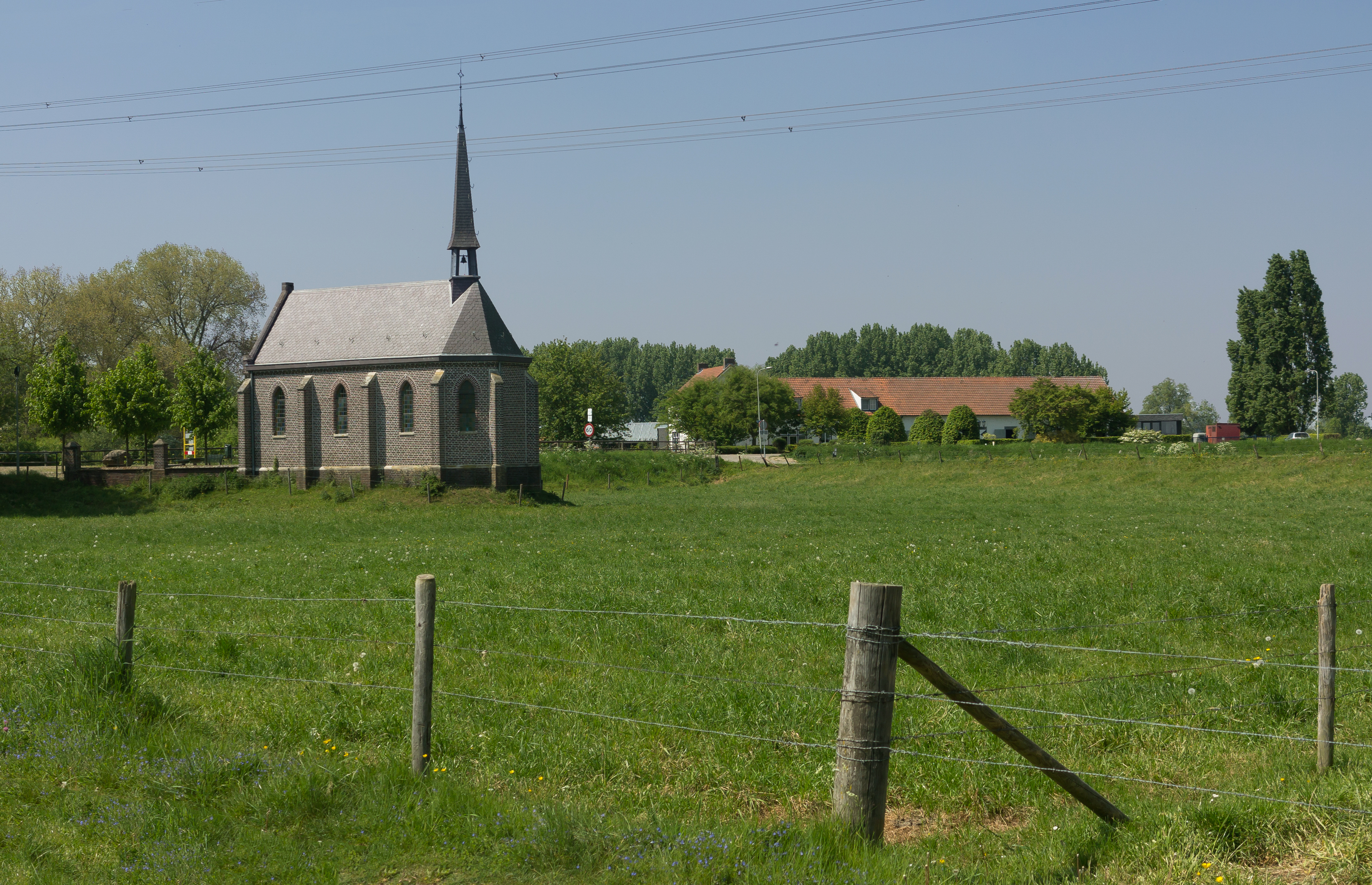
- Sint Anna Chapel

- Location in the Netherlands Location in the province of Limburg in the Netherlands
- Coordinates: 51°06′43″N 5°49′58″E
- Country: Netherlands
- Province: Limburg
- Municipality: Maasgouw

Area
  - Total: 3.89 km^{2} (1.50 sq mi)
- Elevation: 26 m (85 ft)

Population (2021)
  - Total: 830
  - Density: 210/km^{2} (550/sq mi)
- Time zone: UTC+1 (CET)
  - Summer (DST): UTC+2 (CEST)
- Postal code: 6109
- Dialing code: 0475

Ohé en Laak is a village in the province of Limburg, Netherlands, which has been subsumed into the municipality of Maasgouw. The village used to be home to several castles, one of which is Hasseltholt which is popularly called "Het Geudje". The other was the castle of Walburg. This castle was ruined and is fully removed now. The soccer team is called Walburgia. Furthermore, there is a renovated windmill called "De Hompesche molen". In the past this windmill was used for milling wheat and corn flour. The village of Ohé en Laak has got a yacht harbour at the river Maas and currently there are three campsites. The majority of the inhabitants are Roman Catholics, there is a church called "Onze Lieve Vrouw Geboorte" and a chapel called "Sint Anna-kapel".

In recent times the bridge connecting the township of Echt and Ohé en Laak has been renovated to allow for more modern, taller ships to pass. Because of the presence of gravel in the bottom many hectares were dredged during the last decades. The environment will be renovated between 2007 and 2010.

== Gallery ==
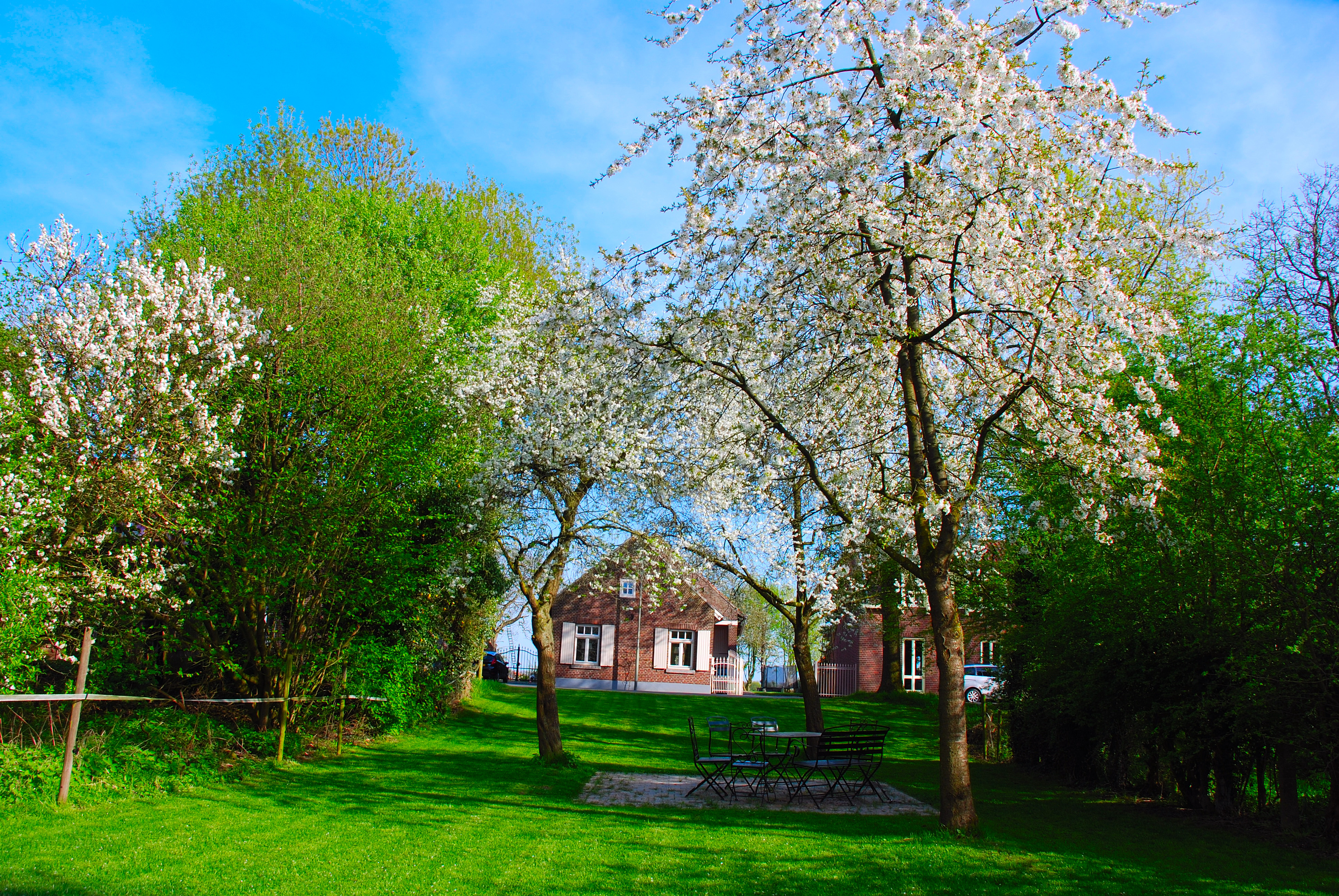
Farm in Ohé en Laak

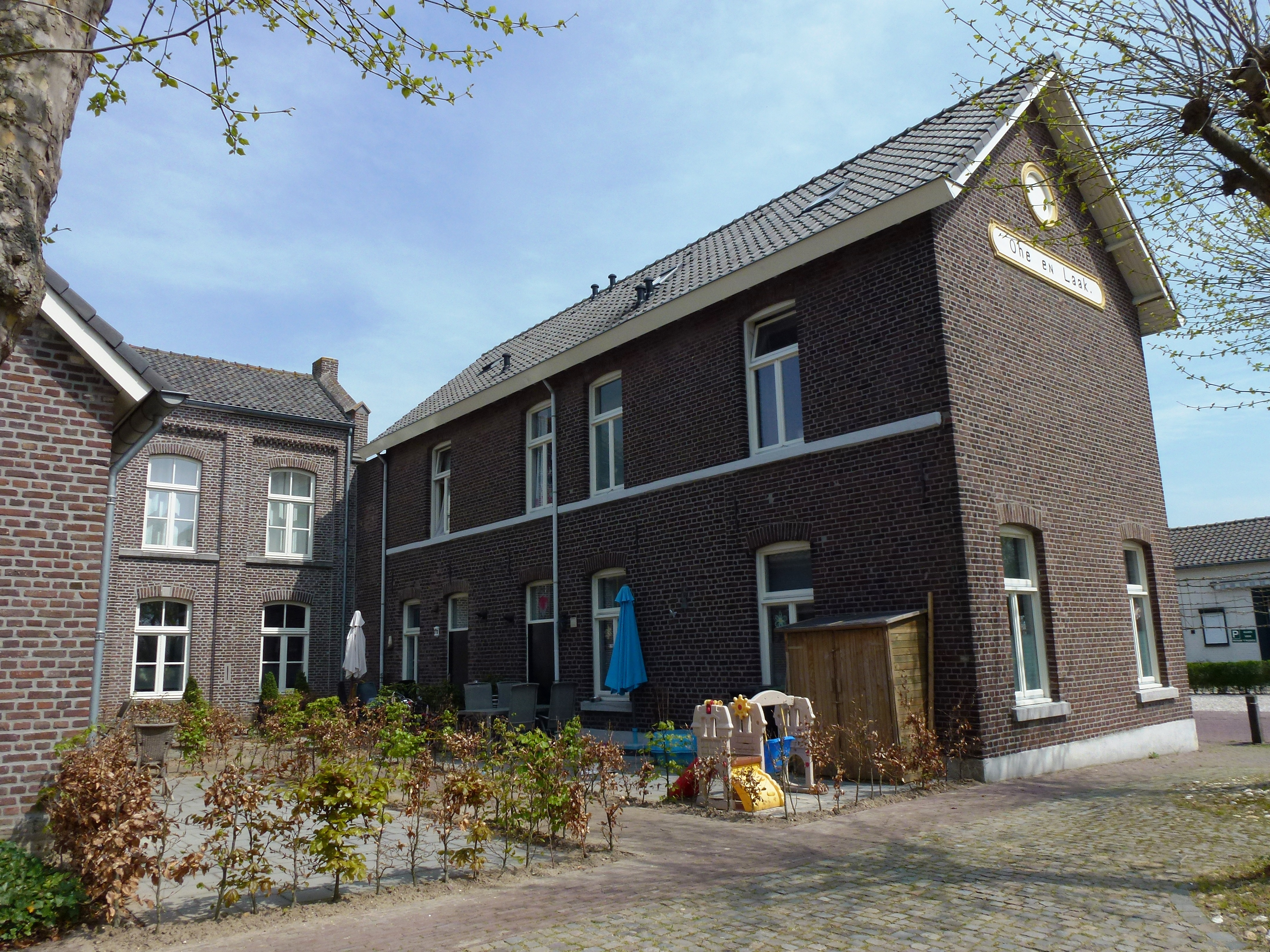
Former town hall

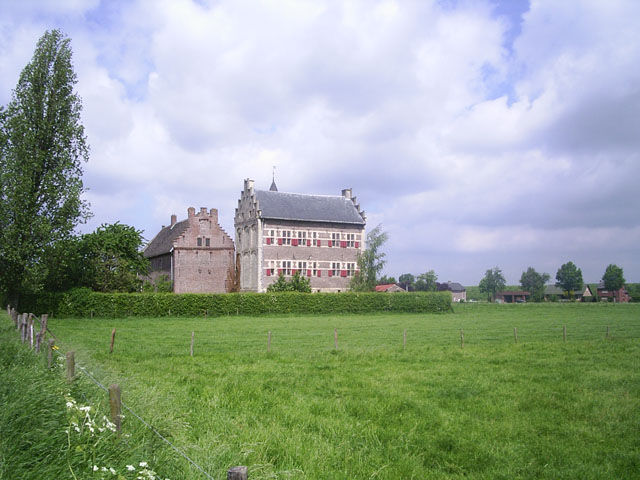
Hasselholt Castle

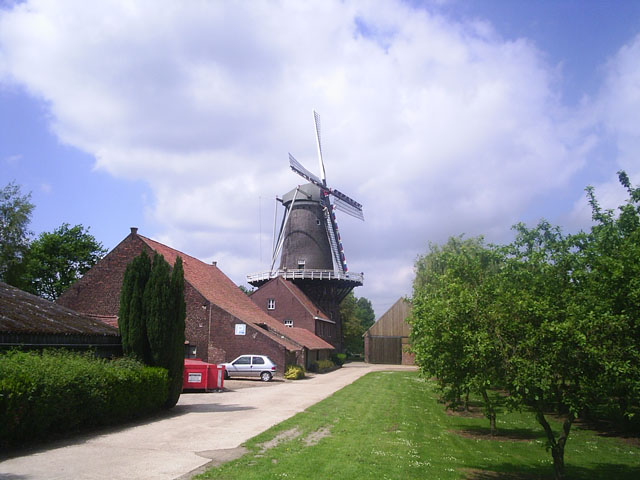
Windmill Hompesche molen
