= Maasgouw =

- Municipality
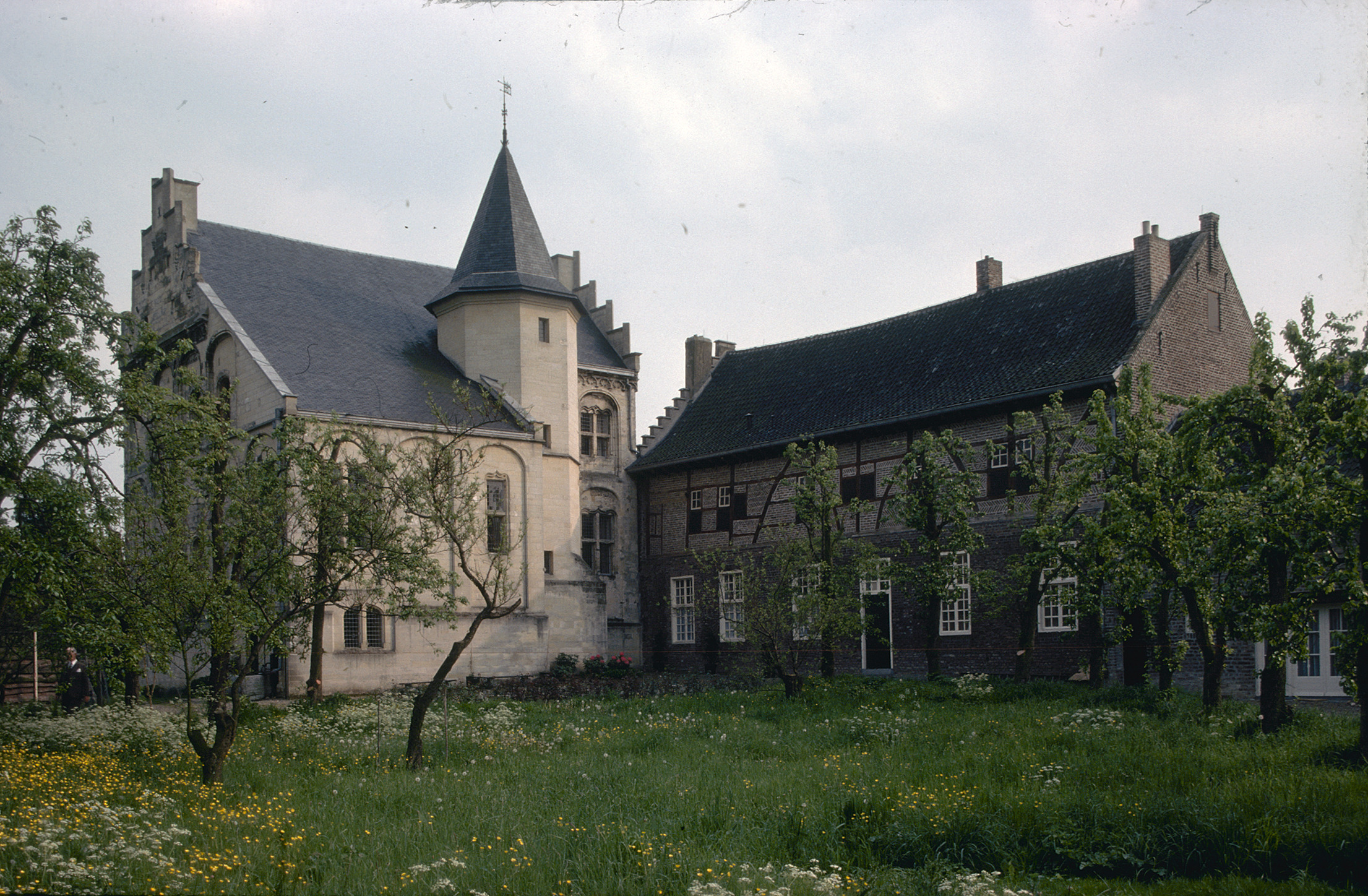
- Hasselholt castle in Ohé en Laak

- Flag Coat of arms

- Location in Limburg

- Location in the Netherlands
- Coordinates: 51°9′N 5°54′E
- Country: Netherlands
- Province: Limburg
- Established: 1 January 2007

Government
  - Body: Municipal council
  - Mayor: Dion Schneider (VVD)

Area
  - Total: 58.12 km^{2} (22.44 sq mi)
  - Land: 45.71 km^{2} (17.65 sq mi)
  - Water: 12.41 km^{2} (4.79 sq mi)
- Elevation: 27 m (89 ft)

Population (January 2021)
  - Total: 23,947
  - Density: 524/km^{2} (1,360/sq mi)
- Time zone: UTC+1 (CET)
  - Summer (DST): UTC+2 (CEST)
- Postcode: Parts of 6000 range
- Area code: 0475
- Website: gemeentemaasgouw.nl

Maasgouw (Dutch pronunciation: [maːsˈxʌu]) is a municipality in the Dutch province of Limburg. It is located on both banks of the river Meuse southwest of the city of Roermond. It was formed in a merger of the former municipalities of Heel, Maasbracht and Thorn on 1 January 2007.

The municipality contains a number of towns and villages:

- Beegden
- Brachterbeek
- Heel
- Linne
- Maasbracht
- Ohé en Laak
- Panheel
- Stevensweert
- Thorn
- Wessem.

== Topography ==
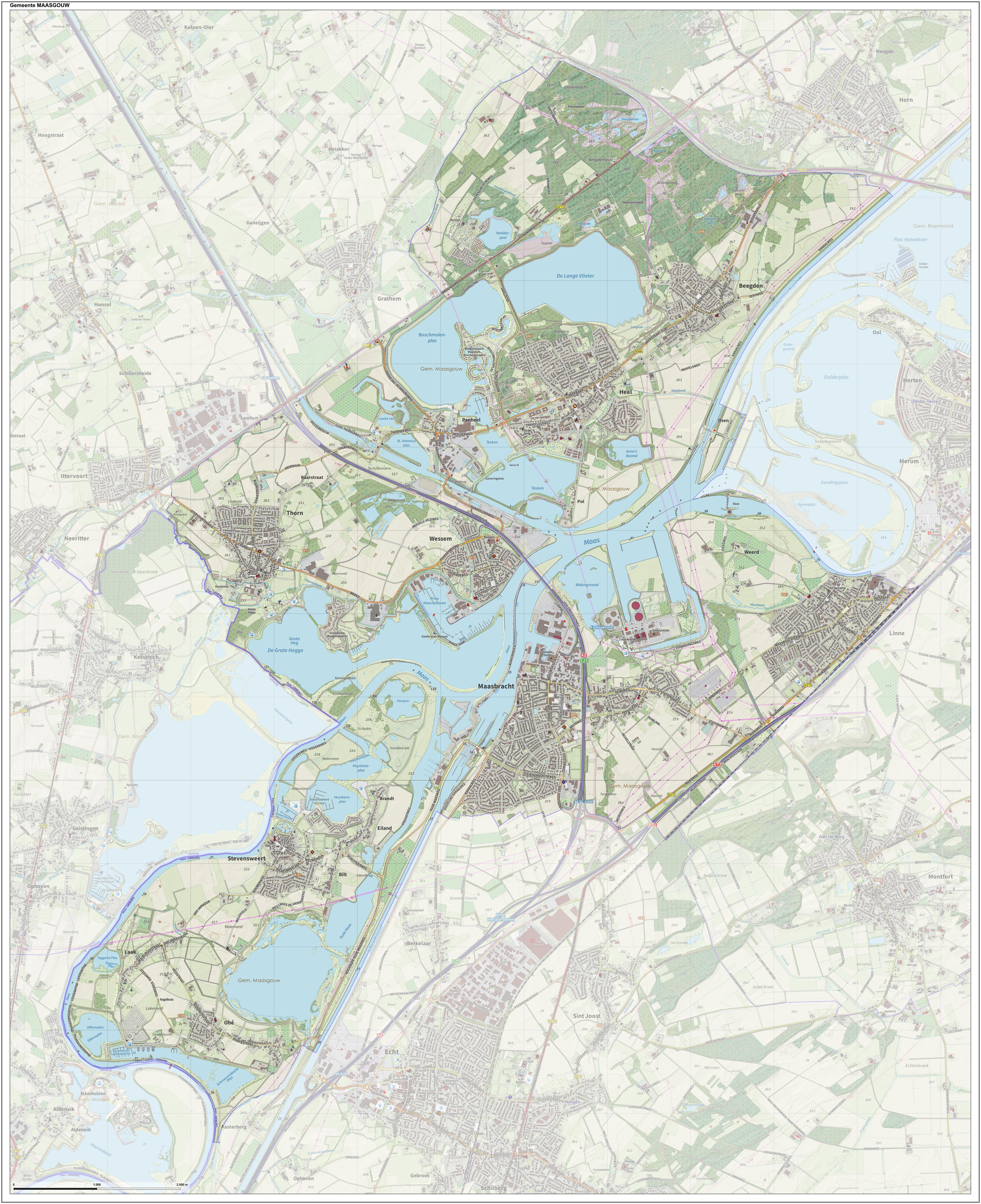

Dutch Topographic map of the municipality of Maasgouw, June 2015.

== Notable people ==
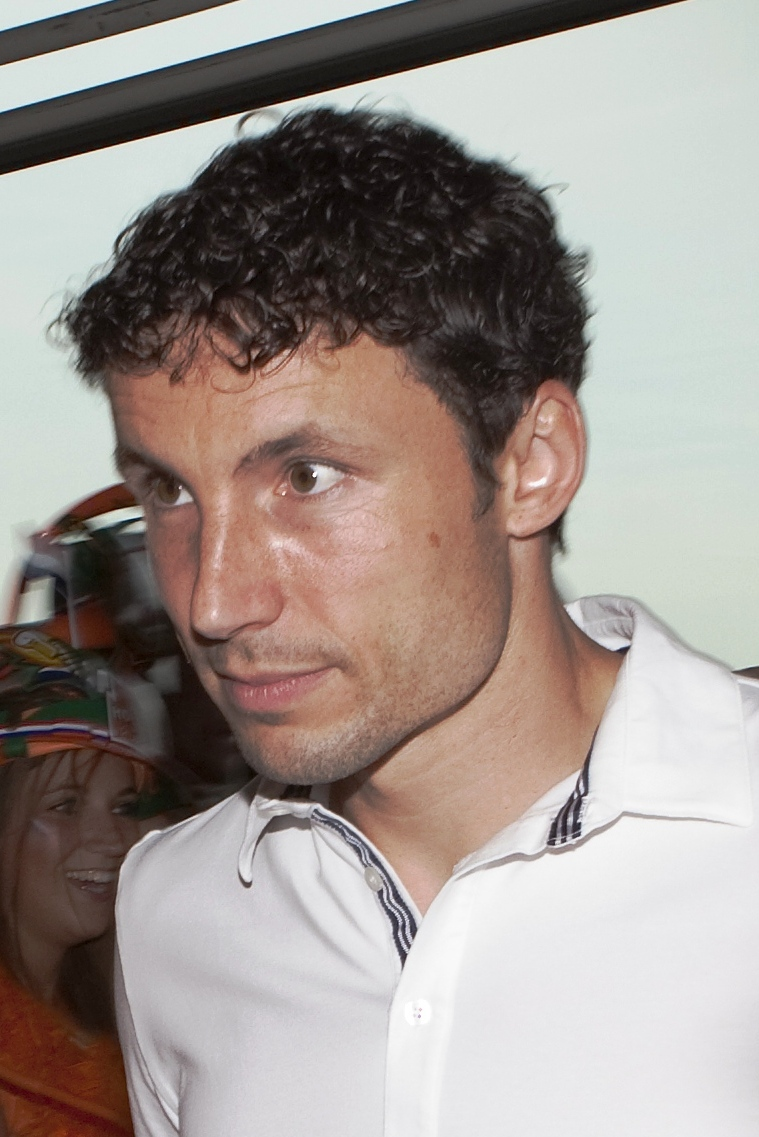
Mark van Bommel, 2010

- Henk van Hoof (born 1947) a retired Dutch politician, lives in Ohé en Laak
- Jan Cober (born 1951 in Thorn) a Dutch conductor and clarinet player
- Guido Geelen (born 1961 in Thorn) a Dutch sculptor, furniture designer and ceramist
- Margo Reuten (born ca.1966 in Maasbracht) a Dutch head chef, holds two Michelin stars
- Lies Visschedijk (born 1974 in Heel) a Dutch actress

=== Sport ===
- Annemiek Derckx (born 1954 in Beegden) a Dutch sprint canoer, twice bronze medallist at the 1984 and 1988 Summer Olympics
- Bas Peters (born 1976 in Heel) a Dutch mountain biker, competed at the 2004 Summer Olympics
- Mark van Bommel (born 1977 in Maasbracht) a Dutch former footballer with 536 club caps.

== Gallery ==
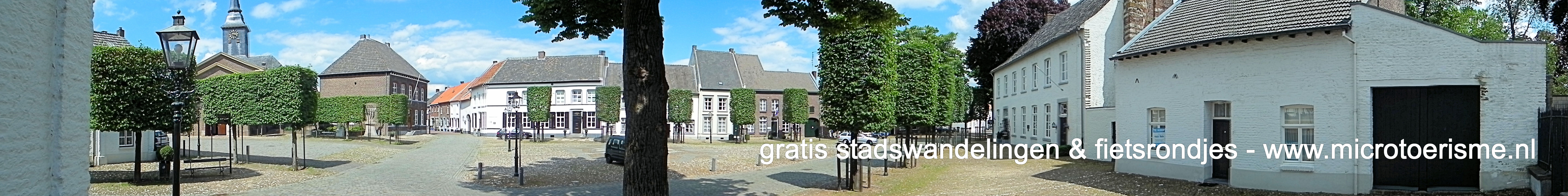
Stevensweert
