= Maasbracht =

- Town
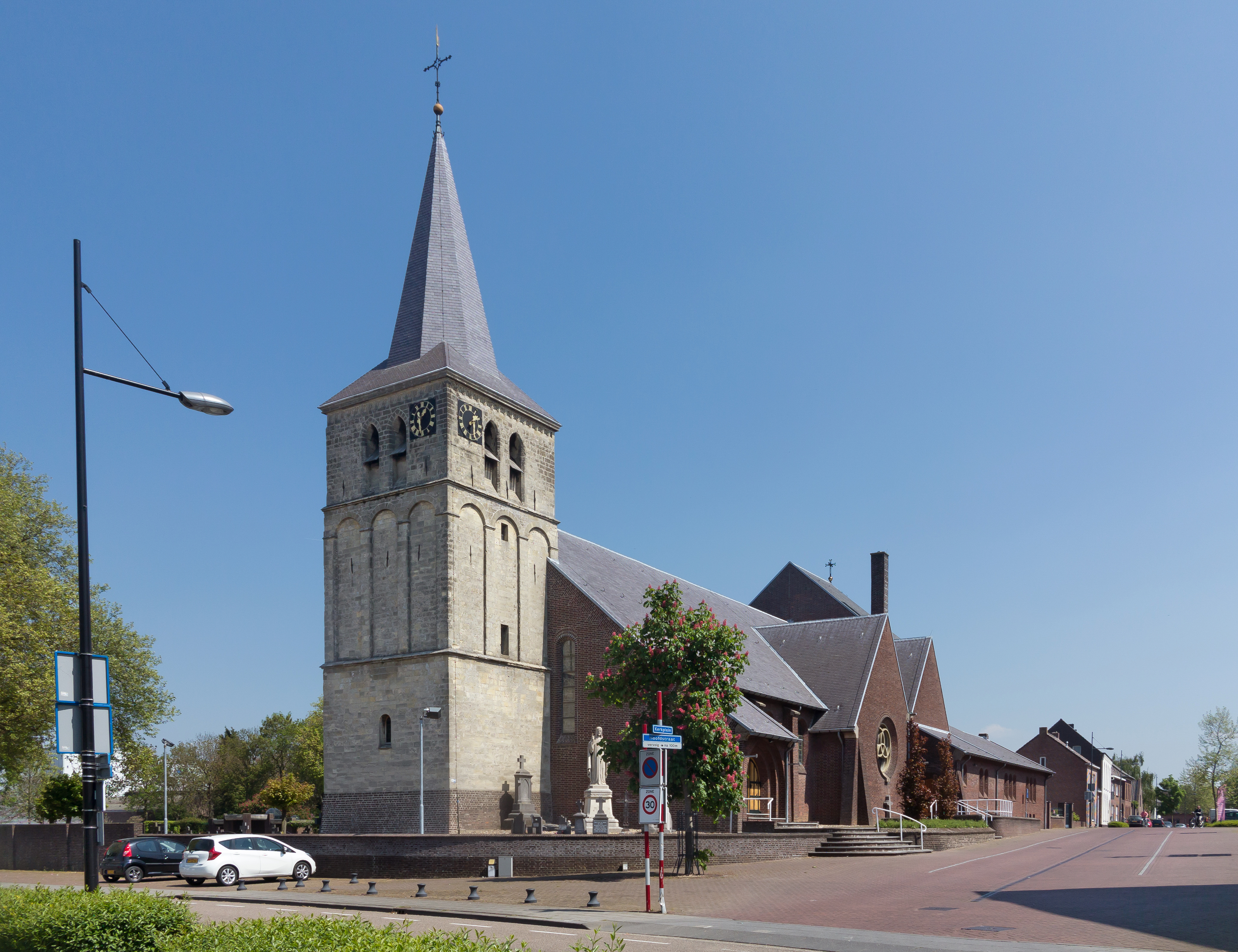
- St Gertrudis Church

- Flag Coat of arms

- Location in the Netherlands Location in the province of Limburg in the Netherlands
- Coordinates: 51°09′N 5°53′E
- Country: Netherlands
- Province: Limburg
- Municipality: Maasgouw

Area
  - Total: 10.80 km^{2} (4.17 sq mi)
- Elevation: 25 m (82 ft)

Population (2021)
  - Total: 7,050
  - Density: 653/km^{2} (1,690/sq mi)
- Time zone: UTC+1 (CET)
  - Summer (DST): UTC+2 (CEST)
- Postal code: 6051
- Dialing code: 0475

Maasbracht (Dutch: [maːzˈbrɑxt]; Limburgish: Brach [ˈbʀɑx]) is a town in the southeastern Netherlands. It was a separate municipality until 1 January 2007, when it became a part of the new municipality of Maasgouw.

== History ==
The village was first mentioned in 1265 as "de Bragth", and means "newly cultivated land near the river Maas." Maasbracht developed along the river Maas in the Early Middle Ages. In 1294, it became part of Ambt Montfort. In 1716, it became part of the Dutch Republic.

The Catholic St Gertrudis Church is a long church with double transept. The tower was built in the 14th century. It was severely damaged in 1944, and a new church was built between 1948 and 1949.

Maasbracht was home to 305 people in 1840. In 1934, the Juliana Canal was dug as a bypass for the unnavigable parts of the Maas. The canal transformed Maasbracht in a main harbour and it started to industrialise. Maasbracht has the largest inland harbour of the Netherlands.

It was an independent municipality until 2007 when it was merged into Maasgouw. It is the capital of the municipality of Maasgouw.

== Notable people ==
- Mark van Bommel (born 1977), football player

== Gallery ==
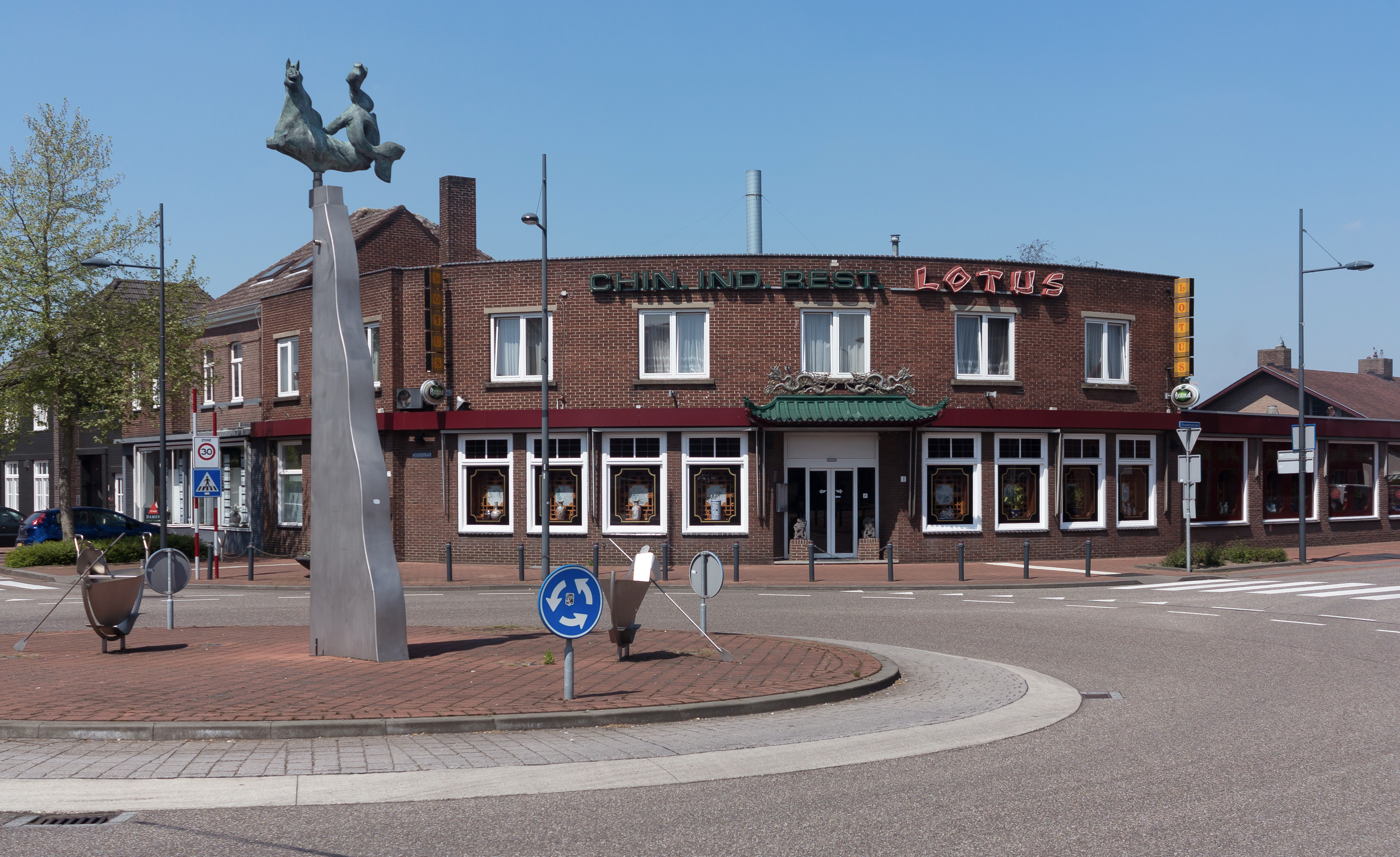
Sculpture at the roundabout

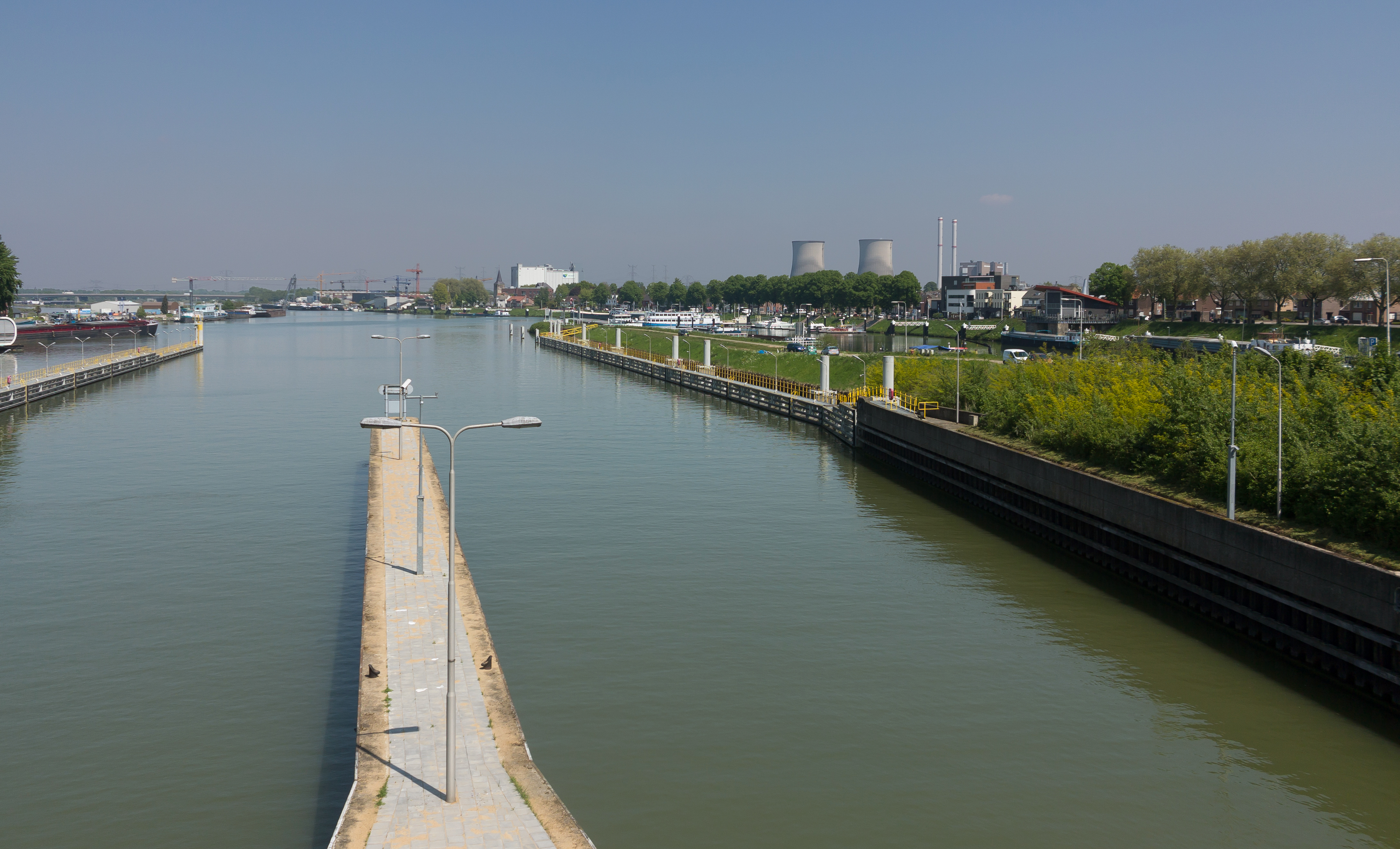
The village near Julianakanaal and the river Maas

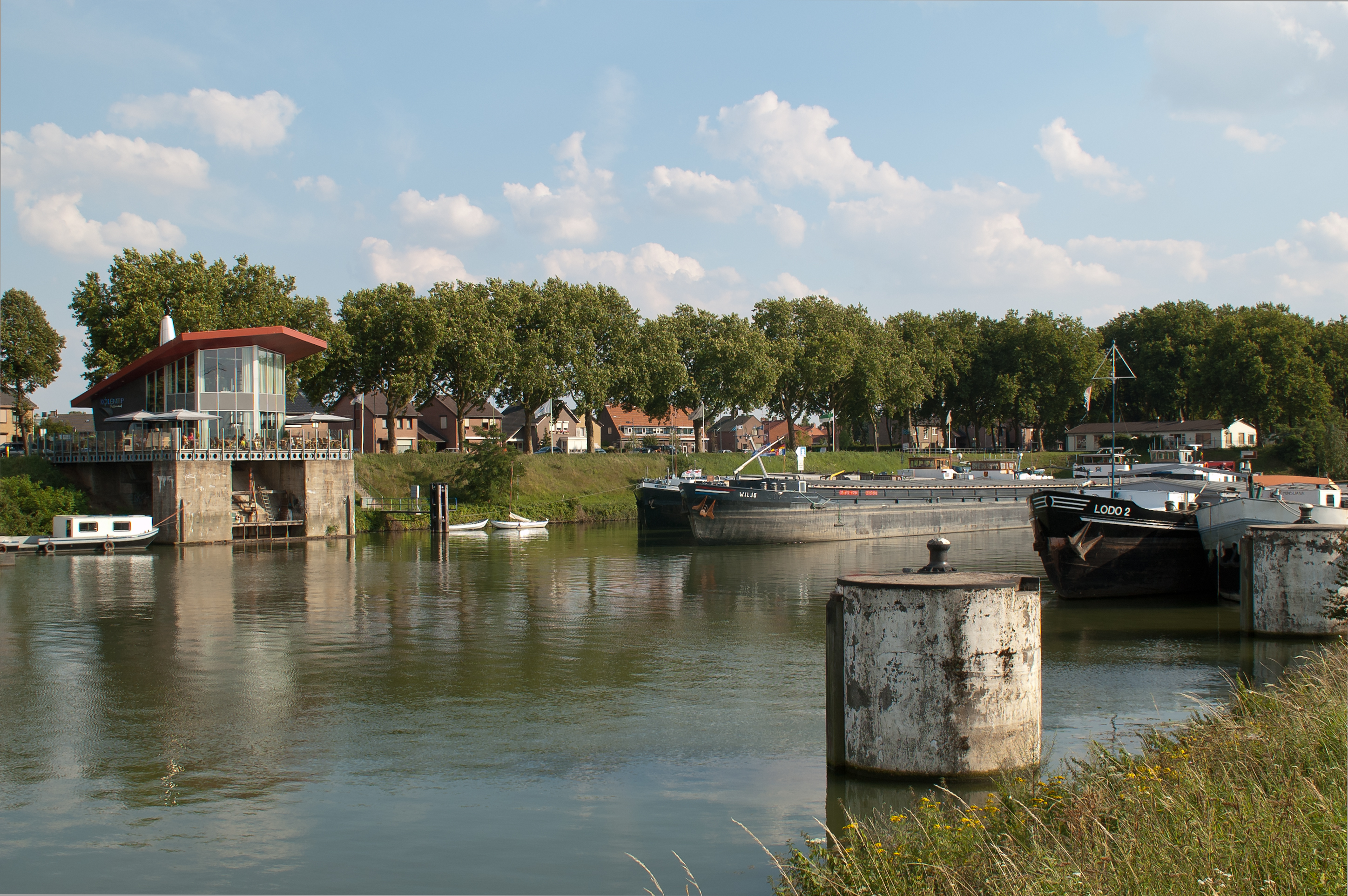
Harbour of Maasbracht

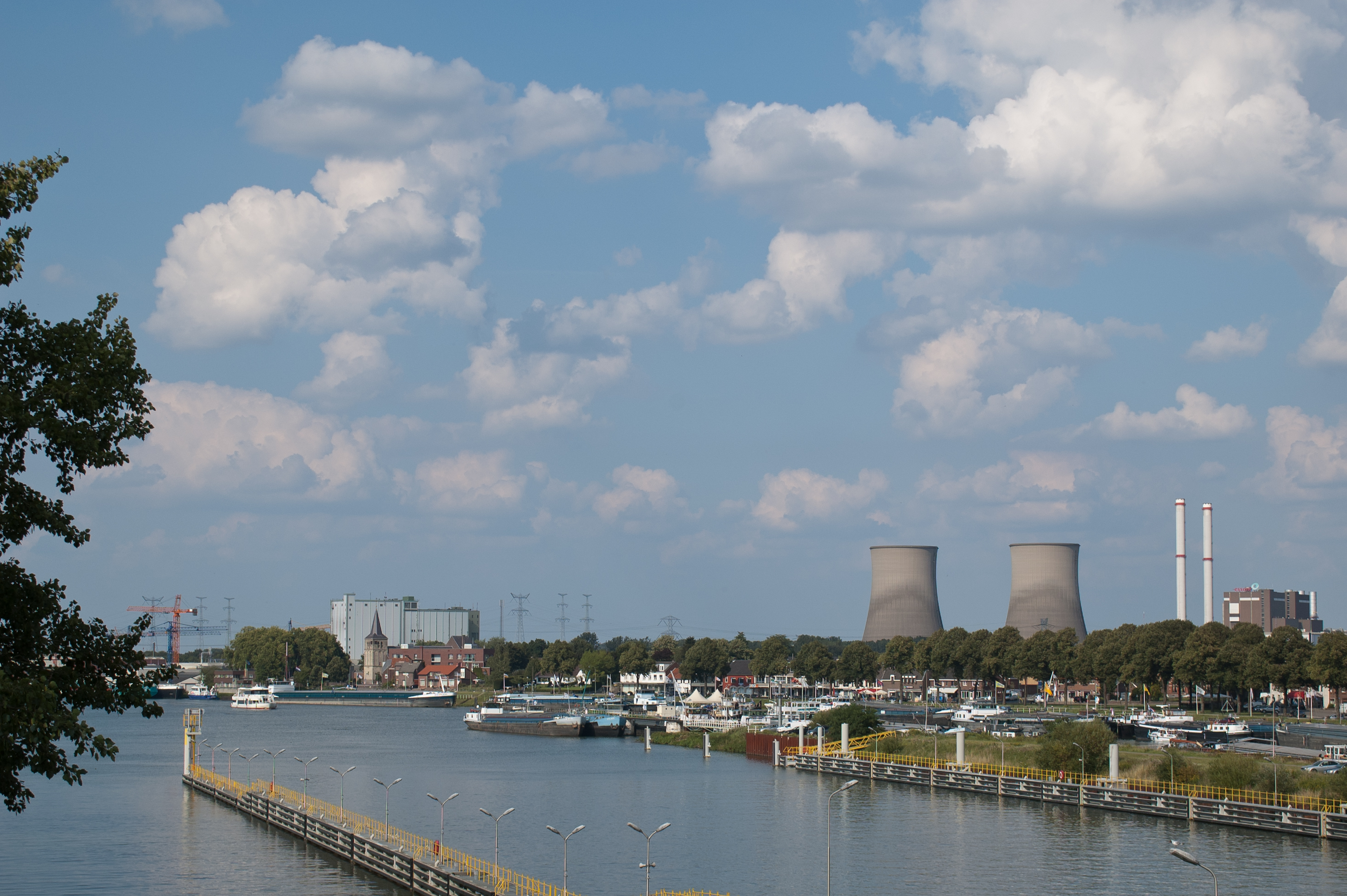
View on Maasbracht
