= VI Reserve Corps =

Corps level command of the German Army in World War I

VI Reserve Corps VI. Reserve-Korps
- Flag of the Staff of a Generalkommando (1871–1918)
- Active: 2 August 1914 – late 1919
- Country: German Empire
- Branch: Imperial German Army
- Type: Corps
- Size: Approximately 38,000 (on formation)
- Engagements: World War I Battle of the Frontiers

Insignia
- Abbreviation: VI RK

The VI Reserve Corps (German: VI. Reserve-Korps / VI RK) was a corps level command of the German Army in World War I.

== Formation ==
VI Reserve Corps was formed on the outbreak of the war in August 1914 as part of the mobilisation of the Army. It was initially commanded by General der Infanterie Konrad von Goßler, brought out of retirement. It was still in existence at the end of the war in the 1st Army, Heeresgruppe Deutscher Kronprinz on the Western Front.

=== Structure on formation ===
On formation in August 1914, VI Reserve Corps consisted of two divisions, made up of reserve units. In general, Reserve Corps and Reserve Divisions were weaker than their active counterparts

Reserve Infantry Regiments did not always have three battalions nor necessarily contain a machine gun company
Reserve Jäger Battalions did not have a machine gun company on formation
Reserve Cavalry Regiments consisted of just three squadrons
Reserve Field Artillery Regiments usually consisted of two Abteilungen of three batteries each
Corps Troops generally consisted of a Telephone Detachment and four sections of munition columns and trains

In summary, VI Reserve Corps mobilised with 23 infantry battalions, 8 machine gun companies (48 machine guns), 6 cavalry squadrons, 12 field artillery batteries (72 guns) and 3 pioneer companies. 11th Reserve Division was slightly stronger than the norm as it included an active infantry brigade.

| Corps | Division | Brigade | Units |
|---|---|---|---|
| VI Reserve Corps | 11th Reserve Division | 23rd Infantry Brigade | 22nd Infantry Regiment |
| VI Reserve Corps | 11th Reserve Division | 23rd Infantry Brigade | 156th Infantry Regiment |
| VI Reserve Corps | 11th Reserve Division | 21st Reserve Infantry Brigade | 10th Reserve Infantry Regiment |
| VI Reserve Corps | 11th Reserve Division | 21st Reserve Infantry Brigade | 11th Reserve Infantry Regiment |
| VI Reserve Corps | 11th Reserve Division | | 4th Reserve Hussar Regiment |
| VI Reserve Corps | 11th Reserve Division | | 11th Reserve Field Artillery Regiment |
| VI Reserve Corps | 11th Reserve Division | | 4th Company, 6th Pioneer Battalion |
| VI Reserve Corps | 11th Reserve Division | | 11th Reserve Divisional Pontoon Train |
| VI Reserve Corps | 11th Reserve Division | | 6th Reserve Medical Company |
| VI Reserve Corps | 12th Reserve Division | 22nd Reserve Infantry Brigade | 23rd Reserve Infantry Regiment |
| VI Reserve Corps | 12th Reserve Division | 22nd Reserve Infantry Brigade | 38th Reserve Infantry Regiment |
| VI Reserve Corps | 12th Reserve Division | 22nd Reserve Infantry Brigade | 6th Reserve Jäger Battalion |
| VI Reserve Corps | 12th Reserve Division | 23rd Reserve Infantry Brigade | 22nd Reserve Infantry Regiment |
| VI Reserve Corps | 12th Reserve Division | 23rd Reserve Infantry Brigade | 51st Reserve Infantry Regiment |
| VI Reserve Corps | 12th Reserve Division | | 4th Reserve Uhlan Regiment |
| VI Reserve Corps | 12th Reserve Division | | 12th Reserve Field Artillery Regiment |
| VI Reserve Corps | 12th Reserve Division | | 1st Reserve Company, 6th Pioneer Battalion |
| VI Reserve Corps | 12th Reserve Division | | 2nd Reserve Company, 6th Pioneer Battalion |
| VI Reserve Corps | 12th Reserve Division | | 20th Reserve Medical Company |
| VI Reserve Corps | Corps Troops | | 6th Reserve Telephone Detachment |
| VI Reserve Corps | Corps Troops | | Munition Trains and Columns corresponding to the III Reserve Corps |

== Combat chronicle ==
=== 1914 ===
On mobilisation, VI Reserve Corps was assigned to the 5th Army forming part of the centre of the forces for the Schlieffen Plan offensive in August 1914.

With the mobilisation at the outbreak of World War I, General of the Infantry von Goßler was appointed Commanding General of the Silesian VI Reserve Corps by a cabinet order (Kabinettsorder). The large unit was transferred to the Western Front and placed under the command of the 5th Army. Colonel von Rath served as Chief of Staff, the 11th Reserve Division was under Major General Surén, and the 12th Reserve Division was led by Lieutenant General von Lüttwitz.

==== August 22 ====
On 22 August 1914, the corps fought in the Battle of Longwy (part of the Battle of the Ardennes). Opposite the French 5th Army Corps under General Brochin, the VI Reserve Corps – on the left with the 12th Reserve Division via Laix – also attacked Longuyon and Pierrepont and reached the Frants–Cutry–Doncourt–Baslieux line. On the right, the 11th Reserve Division advanced via Cutry–Chenières to the Grandville-Ugny line. The 12th Reserve Division was attacked on its left flank from Joppécourt, but withstood the enemy pressure at Doncourt until help arrived from the 10th Reserve Division.

==== August 23 ====
On 23 August, the troops reached the Beuveille-Arrancy line and surrounded the fortress of Longwy, which was defended by a French brigade led by General Darche. The 11th Reserve Division had arrived from Dorbey in front of Longwy and was preparing to attack the town. The 12th Reserve Division captured Doncourt and Beuveille.

==== August 24 ====
On 24 August, the corps fought with the 12th Reserve Division for Arrancy and was pushed back towards the St. Laurent–Pillon line.

==== August 25 ====
On 25 August, further territorial gains were made on the heights south of the Othain stream and between St. Laurent and Sorbey. After the battle, the corps went into trench warfare on the Othain section, while the Armee-Abteilung Strantz established itself on the left wing the following year.

=== 1916 ===
During the Battle of Verdun in 1916, the corps initially provided only artillery support and did not begin its attack on the western bank of the Meuse until 6 March. On 7 March, the 12th and 22nd Reserve Divisions succeeded in capturing the villages of Regnéville and Forges and the strategically important hilltop positions of Côte de l'Oie (lit. 'Goose Ridge') and Côte de Poivre (lit. 'Pepper Ridge'). On 14 March 1916, the Silesian VI Reserve Corps succeeded in capturing one of the peaks of Le Mort Homme and, on 30 March, the village of Malancourt. The VI Reserve Corps was soon withdrawn from the front and transferred to Bapaume as a reserve, from where it was immediately deployed again at the beginning of July in the Battle of the Somme to repel English attacks.

=== 1917 ===
In the spring of 1917, the corps, as the Gruppe Souchez, covered the Liévin–Angres–Givenchy line in the Lens area with the 11th Reserve Division and the 16th Bavarian Infantry Division. At the start of the Battle of Arras, the General Command was replaced by the VIII Reserve Corps.

During the German spring offensive in March 1918, the Korps Borne was assigned to the 17th Army. In July 1918, it reinforced the front of the 7th Army in the area southwest of Reims and launched a brief attack near Chambrecy. After the French counteroffensive from the Forêt de la Montagne, the corps was forced to retreat.

=== Grenzschutz Ost (1919) ===
In January 1919, the VI Reserve Corps, designed to protect the border of East Prussia, was subordinated to the Armeeoberkommando Nord (AOK) of the Grenzschutz Ost in Königsberg, later Bartenstein, under the command of Commanding General Ferdinand von Quast.

In December 1918, the 8th Army had withdrawn from the Eastern Front and was only partially present in the Livonian Governorate. Thus, there was no effective military protection between the advancing Soviet Red Army and East Prussia. With the consent of the Entente, the AOK North was to lead and supply the various volunteer units and to hold back the Red Army.

At the beginning of February 1919, the VI Reserve Corps took over command in Courland. The commanding general, Major General Rüdiger von der Goltz, was in charge of the Gouvernement Libau, the Baltische Landeswehr, the Eiserne Division, the arriving 1st Guards Reserve Division, and various smaller Freikorps. At the beginning of March, a major offensive took place as far as Jelgava. The recapture of Riga on May 22, 1919, was officially carried out without the command of the corps, as the German troops had not received permission to proceed further.

In September 1919, the majority of the Freikorps that had not yet been repatriated transferred to the West Russian Volunteer Army. They thus left the VI Reserve Corps and the German state.

On October 13, 1919, Lieutenant General von Eberhardt replaced von der Goltz, who, because of his arbitrary policy in the Baltic States, was no longer acceptable to either the victorious powers or the German Weimar Republic. After the military defeat of the West Russian Volunteer Army by the Lithuanian Army at the Battle of Radviliškis, the German Freikorps returned to the corps on November 10, which organized their evacuation to East Prussia by December 1919.

== Commanders ==
VI Reserve Corps had the following commanders during its existence:

| From | Rank | Name |
|---|---|---|
| 2 August 1914 | General der Infanterie | Konrad von Goßler |
| 10 February 1917 | Generalleutnant | Kurt von dem Borne |
| 18 April 1918 | General der Infanterie | Kurt von dem Borne |

== See also ==
- German Army order of battle (1914)
- German Army order of battle, Western Front (1918)

== Bibliography ==
- Cron, Hermann (2002). Imperial German Army 1914-18: Organisation, Structure, Orders-of-Battle [first published: 1937]. Helion & Co. ISBN 1-874622-70-1.
- Ellis, John; Cox, Michael (1993). The World War I Databook. Aurum Press Ltd. ISBN 1-85410-766-6.
- Histories of Two Hundred and Fifty-One Divisions of the German Army which Participated in the War (1914-1918), compiled from records of Intelligence section of the General Staff, American Expeditionary Forces, at General Headquarters, Chaumont, France 1919. The London Stamp Exchange Ltd. 1989 [1920]. ISBN 0-948130-87-3.
- The German Forces in the Field; 7th Revision, 11th November 1918; Compiled by the General Staff, War Office. Imperial War Museum, London and the Battery Press. 1995 [1918]. ISBN 978-1-870423-95-3.
