= Brabant-en-Argonne =

- Commune
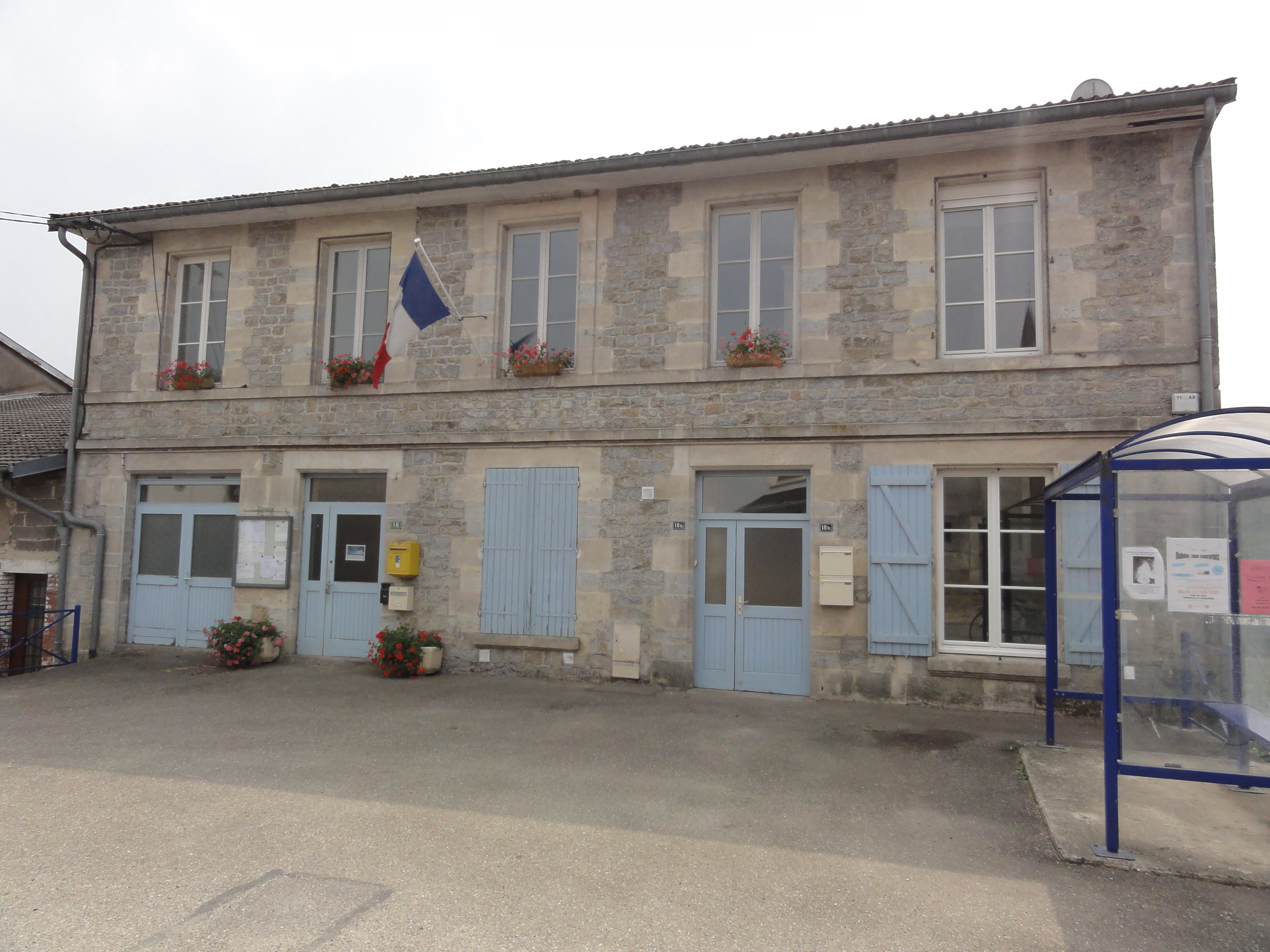
- The town hall in Brabant-en-Argonne

- Coat of arms
- Location of Brabant-en-Argonne
- Location within France Location within Grand Est
- Coordinates: 49°07′26″N 5°08′13″E
- Country: France
- Region: Grand Est
- Department: Meuse
- Arrondissement: Verdun
- Canton: Clermont-en-Argonne
- Intercommunality: Argonne-Meuse

Government
  - Mayor (2020–2026): Emmanuel Sprangers
- Area^{1}: 7.8 km^{2} (3.0 sq mi)
- Population (2023): 98
  - Density: 13/km^{2} (33/sq mi)
- Time zone: UTC+01:00 (CET)
  - Summer (DST): UTC+02:00 (CEST)
- INSEE/Postal code: 55068 /55120
- ^{1} French Land Register data, which excludes lakes, ponds, glaciers > 1 km^{2} (0.386 sq mi or 247 acres) and river estuaries.

Brabant-en-Argonne (French pronunciation: [bʁabɑ̃ ɑ̃.n‿aʁɡɔn], literally Brabant in Argonne) is a commune in the Meuse department in Grand Est in northeastern France.

This commune was merged with Récicourt 1 January 1973. It was then re-established as a commune on 1 January 2004.

== Population ==
Historical population
Year	Pop.	±% p.a.
1968	100	—
1975	90	−1.49%
1982	89	−0.16%
1990	93	+0.55%
1999	109	+1.78%
2007	107	−0.23%
2012	104	−0.57%
2017	106	+0.38%
2023	98	−1.30%
Source: INSEE

Population data refer to the area corresponding with the commune as of January 2025.

== See also ==
- Communes of the Meuse department
