= Cuisy =

Cuisy is the name of two communes in France:

- Cuisy, in the Meuse département
- Cuisy, in the Seine-et-Marne département
