= Froidos =

- Commune
- Coat of arms
- Location of Froidos
- Location within France Location within Grand Est
- Coordinates: 49°03′40″N 5°07′26″E
- Country: France
- Region: Grand Est
- Department: Meuse
- Arrondissement: Verdun
- Canton: Clermont-en-Argonne
- Intercommunality: CC Argonne-Meuse

Government
  - Mayor (2020–2026): Annie Perot
- Area^{1}: 8.74 km^{2} (3.37 sq mi)
- Elevation: 210 m (690 ft)
- Highest elevation: 295 m (968 ft)
- Lowest elevation: 195 m (640 ft)
- Population (2023): 97
  - Density: 11/km^{2} (29/sq mi)
- Time zone: UTC+01:00 (CET)
  - Summer (DST): UTC+02:00 (CEST)
- INSEE/Postal code: 55199 /55120
- ^{1} French Land Register data, which excludes lakes, ponds, glaciers > 1 km^{2} (0.386 sq mi or 247 acres) and river estuaries.

Froidos (French pronunciation: [fʁwado]) is a commune in the Meuse department in Grand Est in north-eastern France.

== See also ==
- Communes of the Meuse department
