= Septsarges =

- Commune
- Coat of arms
- Location of Septsarges
- Location within France Location within Grand Est
- Coordinates: 49°16′52″N 5°10′06″E
- Country: France
- Region: Grand Est
- Department: Meuse
- Arrondissement: Verdun
- Canton: Clermont-en-Argonne
- Intercommunality: Argonne-Meuse

Government
  - Mayor (2020–2026): Daniel Denis
- Area^{1}: 8.86 km^{2} (3.42 sq mi)
- Elevation: 250 m (820 ft)
- Highest elevation: 304 m (997 ft)
- Lowest elevation: 208 m (682 ft)
- Population (2023): 47
  - Density: 5.3/km^{2} (14/sq mi)
- Time zone: UTC+01:00 (CET)
  - Summer (DST): UTC+02:00 (CEST)
- INSEE/Postal code: 55484 /55270
- ^{1} French Land Register data, which excludes lakes, ponds, glaciers > 1 km^{2} (0.386 sq mi or 247 acres) and river estuaries.

Septsarges is a commune in Meuse, a department in Grand Est in northeastern France.

== See also ==
- Communes of the Meuse department
