= Dombasle-en-Argonne =

- Commune
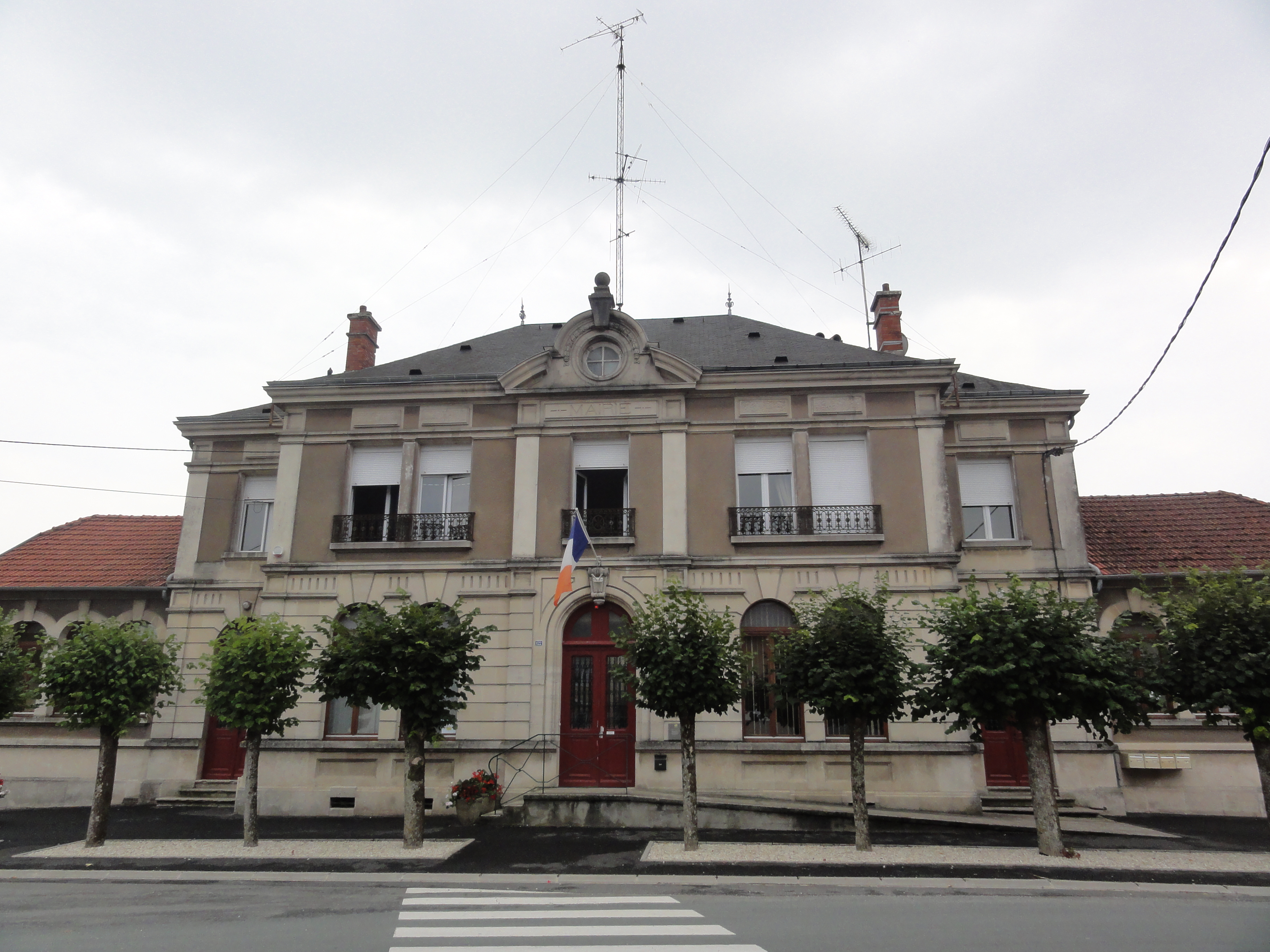
- The town hall in Dombasle-en-Argonne

- Coat of arms
- Location of Dombasle-en-Argonne
- Location within France Location within Grand Est
- Coordinates: 49°08′17″N 5°11′30″E
- Country: France
- Region: Grand Est
- Department: Meuse
- Arrondissement: Verdun
- Canton: Clermont-en-Argonne
- Intercommunality: CC Argonne-Meuse

Government
  - Mayor (2020–2026): Hélène Olivier
- Area^{1}: 11.68 km^{2} (4.51 sq mi)
- Elevation: 206 m (676 ft)
- Highest elevation: 318 m (1,043 ft)
- Lowest elevation: 207 m (679 ft)
- Population (2023): 365
  - Density: 31.2/km^{2} (80.9/sq mi)
- Time zone: UTC+01:00 (CET)
  - Summer (DST): UTC+02:00 (CEST)
- INSEE/Postal code: 55155 /55120
- ^{1} French Land Register data, which excludes lakes, ponds, glaciers > 1 km^{2} (0.386 sq mi or 247 acres) and river estuaries.

Dombasle-en-Argonne (French pronunciation: [dɔ̃bal ɑ̃.n‿aʁɡɔn], literally Dombasle in Argonne) is a commune in the Meuse department in Grand Est in north-eastern France.

== See also ==
- Communes of the Meuse department
