= Canton of Clermont-en-Argonne =

Coordinates: 49.11°N 5.07°E

The canton of Clermont-en-Argonne is an administrative division of the Meuse department, northeastern France. Its borders were modified at the French canton reorganisation which came into effect in March 2015. Its seat is in Clermont-en-Argonne.

It consists of the following communes:

1. Aubréville
2. Avocourt
3. Bantheville
4. Baulny
5. Béthelainville
6. Béthincourt
7. Boureuilles
8. Brabant-en-Argonne
9. Brabant-sur-Meuse
10. Brocourt-en-Argonne
11. Charpentry
12. Chattancourt
13. Cheppy
14. Cierges-sous-Montfaucon
15. Le Claon
16. Clermont-en-Argonne
17. Consenvoye
18. Cuisy
19. Cunel
20. Dannevoux
21. Dombasle-en-Argonne
22. Épinonville
23. Esnes-en-Argonne
24. Forges-sur-Meuse
25. Froidos
26. Fromeréville-les-Vallons
27. Futeau
28. Gercourt-et-Drillancourt
29. Gesnes-en-Argonne
30. Les Islettes
31. Jouy-en-Argonne
32. Lachalade
33. Malancourt
34. Marre
35. Montblainville
36. Montfaucon-d'Argonne
37. Montzéville
38. Nantillois
39. Le Neufour
40. Neuvilly-en-Argonne
41. Rarécourt
42. Récicourt
43. Regnéville-sur-Meuse
44. Romagne-sous-Montfaucon
45. Septsarges
46. Sivry-sur-Meuse
47. Varennes-en-Argonne
48. Vauquois
49. Véry
50. Vilosnes-Haraumont
