= Gesnes-en-Argonne =

- Commune
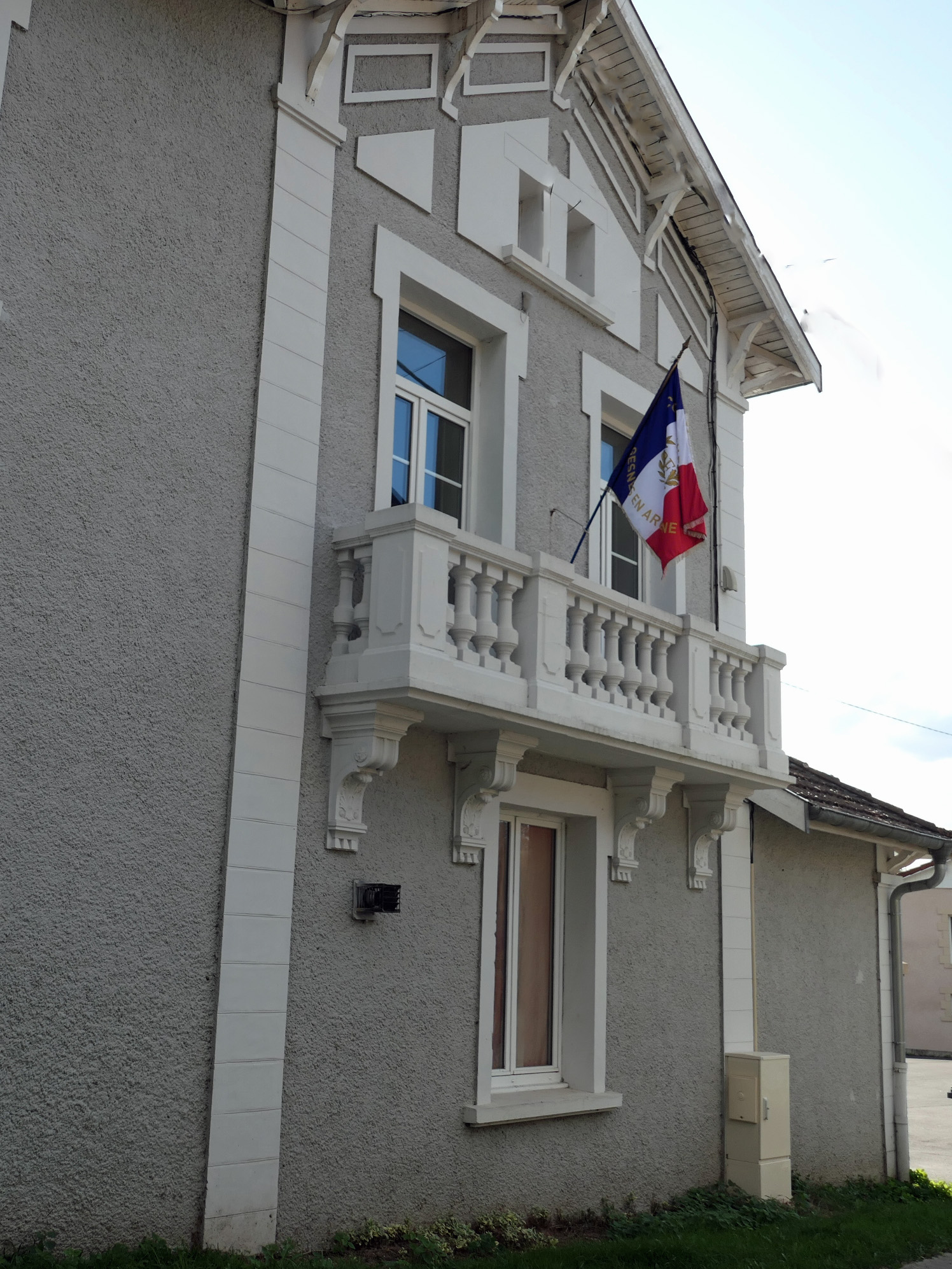
- Town hall

- Coat of arms
- Location of Gesnes-en-Argonne
- Location within France Location within Grand Est
- Coordinates: 49°18′24″N 5°03′39″E
- Country: France
- Region: Grand Est
- Department: Meuse
- Arrondissement: Verdun
- Canton: Clermont-en-Argonne
- Intercommunality: Argonne-Meuse

Government
  - Mayor (2020–2026): Jean-Claude Venet
- Area^{1}: 7.06 km^{2} (2.73 sq mi)
- Elevation: 218 m (715 ft)
- Highest elevation: 254 m (833 ft)
- Lowest elevation: 165 m (541 ft)
- Population (2023): 53
  - Density: 7.5/km^{2} (19/sq mi)
- Time zone: UTC+01:00 (CET)
  - Summer (DST): UTC+02:00 (CEST)
- INSEE/Postal code: 55208 /55110
- ^{1} French Land Register data, which excludes lakes, ponds, glaciers > 1 km^{2} (0.386 sq mi or 247 acres) and river estuaries.

Gesnes-en-Argonne (French pronunciation: [ʒɛn ɑ̃.n‿aʁɡɔn], literally Gesnes in Argonne) is a commune in the Meuse department in Grand Est in north-eastern France.

== See also ==
- Communes of the Meuse department
