= Avocourt =

- Commune
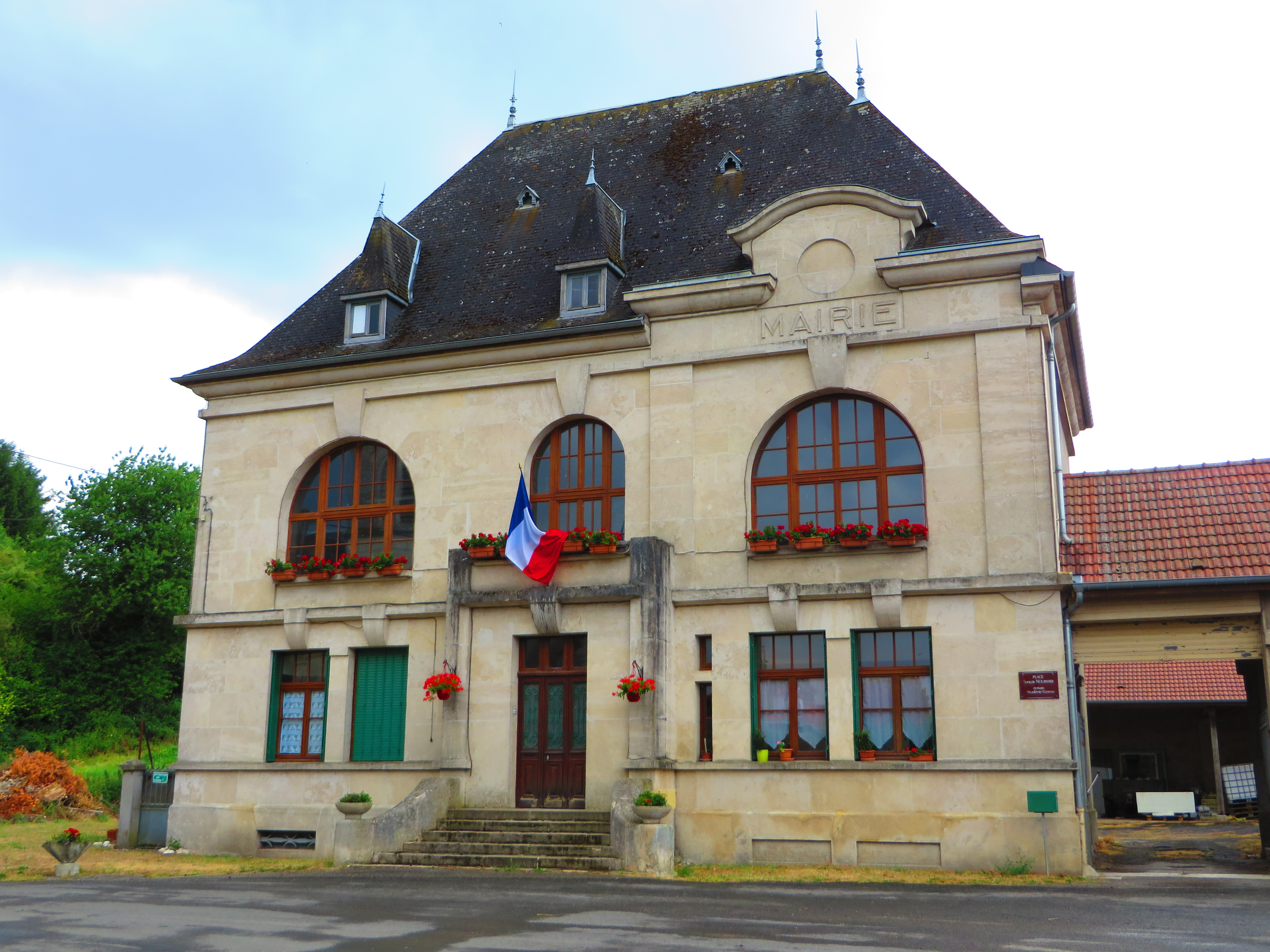
- The town hall in Avocourt

- Coat of arms
- Location of Avocourt
- Location within France Location within Grand Est
- Coordinates: 49°12′27″N 5°08′36″E
- Country: France
- Region: Grand Est
- Department: Meuse
- Arrondissement: Verdun
- Canton: Clermont-en-Argonne
- Intercommunality: CC Argonne-Meuse

Government
  - Mayor (2020–2026): Mario Geis
- Area^{1}: 14.66 km^{2} (5.66 sq mi)
- Elevation: 225 m (738 ft)
- Highest elevation: 305 m (1,001 ft)
- Lowest elevation: 193 m (633 ft)
- Population (2023): 120
  - Density: 8.2/km^{2} (21/sq mi)
- Time zone: UTC+01:00 (CET)
  - Summer (DST): UTC+02:00 (CEST)
- INSEE/Postal code: 55023 /55270
- ^{1} French Land Register data, which excludes lakes, ponds, glaciers > 1 km^{2} (0.386 sq mi or 247 acres) and river estuaries.

Avocourt (French pronunciation: [avɔkuʁ]) is a commune in the Meuse department in the Grand Est region in northeastern France.

== Population ==
Historical population
Year	Pop.	±% p.a.
1968	182	—
1975	118	−6.00%
1982	103	−1.92%
1990	114	+1.28%
1999	107	−0.70%
2007	127	+2.17%
2012	123	−0.64%
2017	108	−2.57%
2023	120	+1.77%
Source: INSEE

== See also ==
- Communes of the Meuse department
