= Lachalade =

- Commune
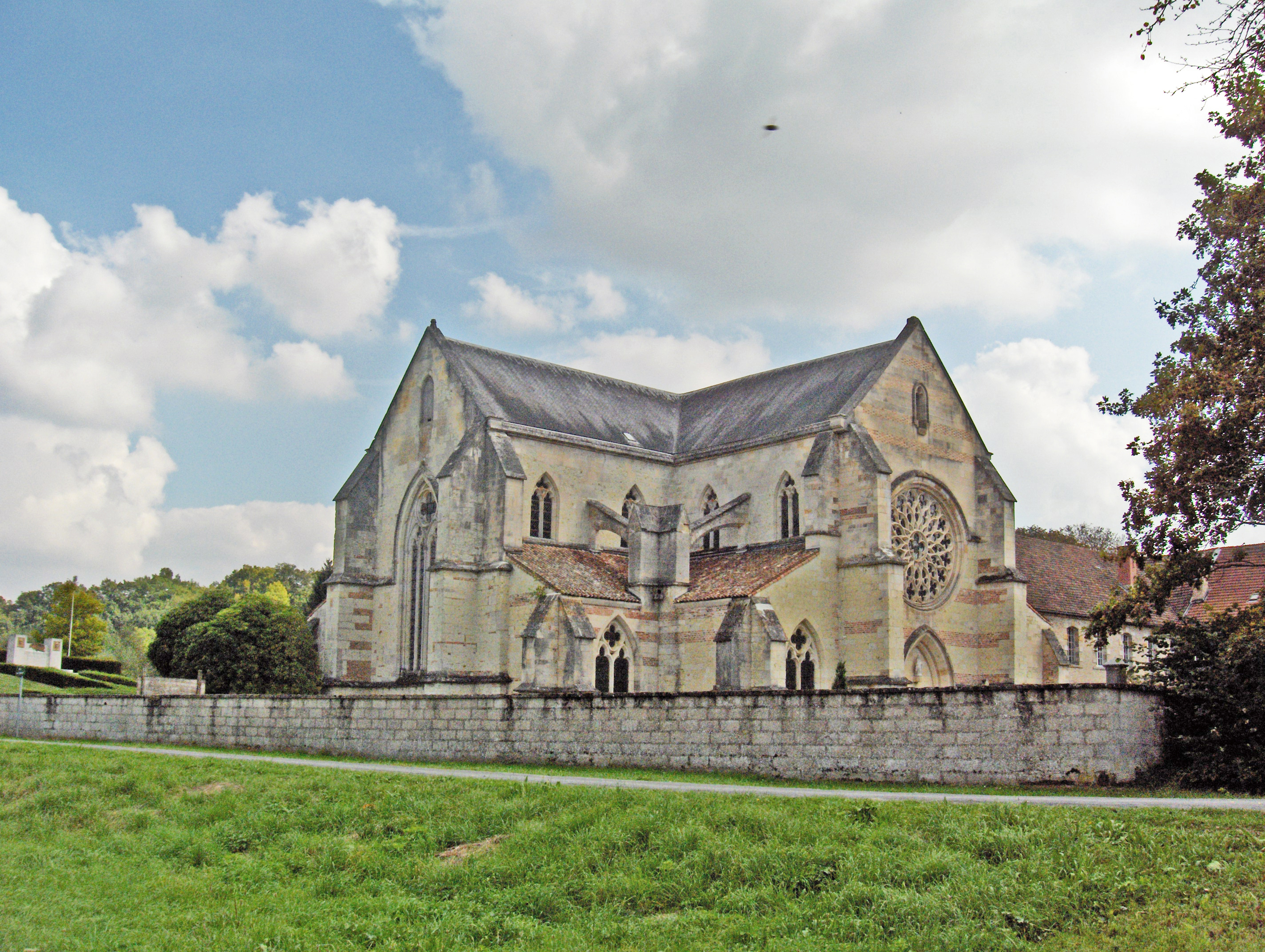
- The abbey in Lachalade

- Coat of arms
- Location of Lachalade
- Location within France Location within Grand Est
- Coordinates: 49°10′03″N 4°57′36″E
- Country: France
- Region: Grand Est
- Department: Meuse
- Arrondissement: Verdun
- Canton: Clermont-en-Argonne
- Intercommunality: CC Argonne-Meuse

Government
  - Mayor (2023–2026): Florent Mlynski
- Area^{1}: 19.45 km^{2} (7.51 sq mi)
- Elevation: 161 m (528 ft)
- Highest elevation: 273 m (896 ft)
- Lowest elevation: 137 m (449 ft)
- Population (2023): 57
  - Density: 2.9/km^{2} (7.6/sq mi)
- Time zone: UTC+01:00 (CET)
  - Summer (DST): UTC+02:00 (CEST)
- INSEE/Postal code: 55266 /55120
- ^{1} French Land Register data, which excludes lakes, ponds, glaciers > 1 km^{2} (0.386 sq mi or 247 acres) and river estuaries.

Lachalade (French pronunciation: [laʃalad]) is a commune in the Meuse department in Grand Est in north-eastern France.

== See also ==
- Communes of the Meuse department
