= Aubréville =

- Commune
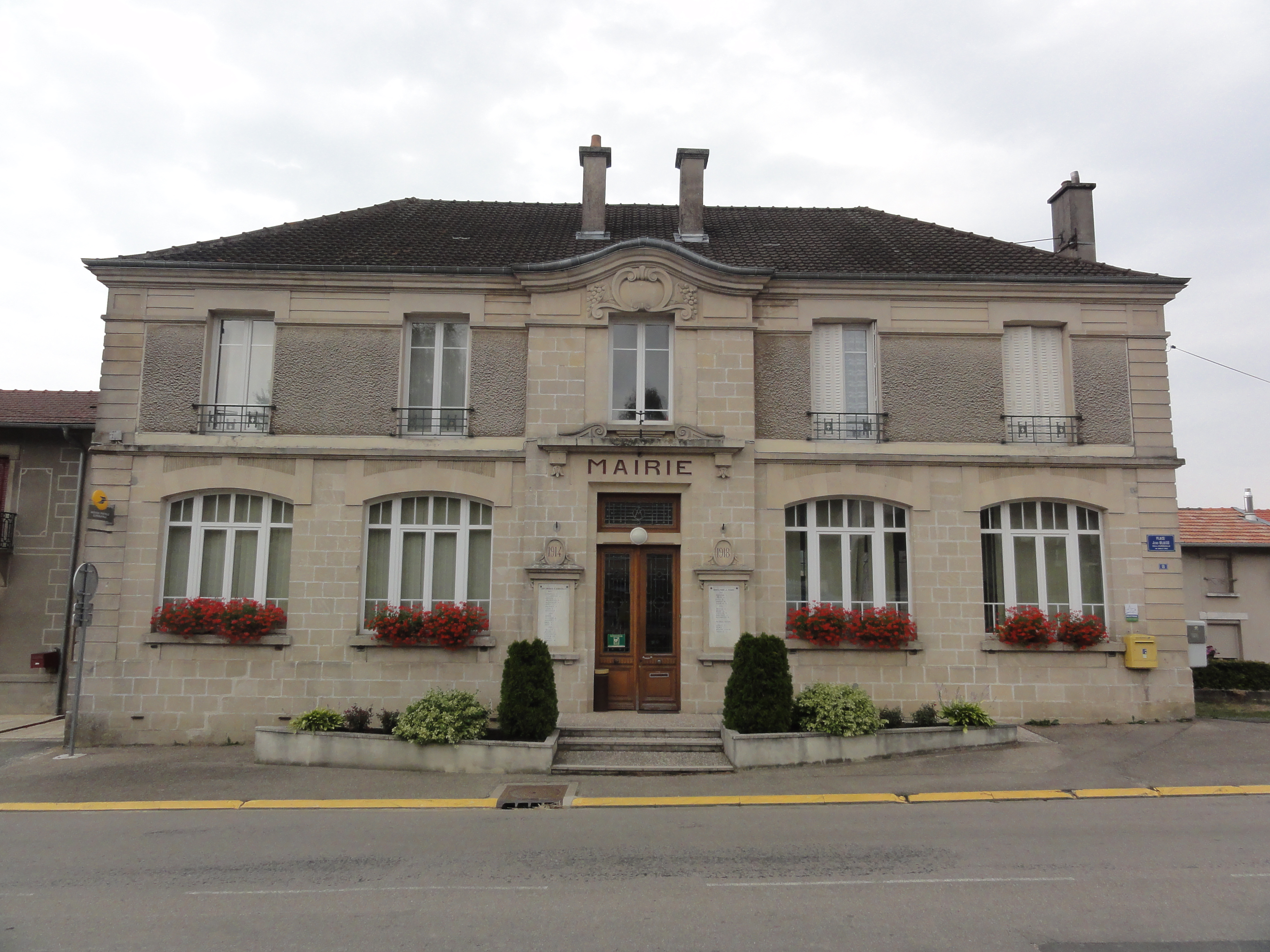
- The town hall in Aubréville

- Coat of arms
- Location of Aubréville
- Location within France Location within Grand Est
- Coordinates: 49°08′39″N 5°04′56″E
- Country: France
- Region: Grand Est
- Department: Meuse
- Arrondissement: Verdun
- Canton: Clermont-en-Argonne
- Intercommunality: CC Argonne-Meuse

Government
  - Mayor (2020–2026): Sébastien Jadoul
- Area^{1}: 20.97 km^{2} (8.10 sq mi)
- Elevation: 183 m (600 ft)
- Highest elevation: 300 m (980 ft)
- Lowest elevation: 174 m (571 ft)
- Population (2023): 375
  - Density: 17.9/km^{2} (46.3/sq mi)
- Demonym: Aubrevillois
- Time zone: UTC+01:00 (CET)
  - Summer (DST): UTC+02:00 (CEST)
- INSEE/Postal code: 55014 /55120
- ^{1} French Land Register data, which excludes lakes, ponds, glaciers > 1 km^{2} (0.386 sq mi or 247 acres) and river estuaries.

Aubréville (French pronunciation: [obʁevil]) is a commune in the Meuse department in the Grand Est region in northeastern France.

== Climate ==
On average, Aubréville experiences 64.5 days per year with a minimum temperature below 0 °C (32.0 °F), 2.5 days per year with a minimum temperature below −10 °C (14.0 °F), 6.3 days per year with a maximum temperature below 0 °C (32.0 °F), and 16.7 days per year with a maximum temperature above 30 °C (86.0 °F). The record high temperature was 41.8 °C (107.2 °F) on July 25, 2019, while the record low temperature was −15.7 °C (3.7 °F) on December 20, 2009.

Climate data for Aubréville (1991–2020 normals, extremes 2008–present)
Month	Jan	Feb	Mar	Apr	May	Jun	Jul	Aug	Sep	Oct	Nov	Dec	Year
Record high °C (°F)	16.3 (61.3)	22.6 (72.7)	26.2 (79.2)	28.9 (84.0)	33.3 (91.9)	37.0 (98.6)	41.8 (107.2)	38.4 (101.1)	35.9 (96.6)	28.8 (83.8)	22.8 (73.0)	17.2 (63.0)	41.8 (107.2)
Mean daily maximum °C (°F)	5.6 (42.1)	7.1 (44.8)	12.1 (53.8)	16.8 (62.2)	19.9 (67.8)	23.5 (74.3)	26.3 (79.3)	25.7 (78.3)	21.6 (70.9)	16.0 (60.8)	10.3 (50.5)	6.7 (44.1)	16.0 (60.7)
Daily mean °C (°F)	2.9 (37.2)	3.6 (38.5)	6.7 (44.1)	10.3 (50.5)	13.5 (56.3)	17.1 (62.8)	19.4 (66.9)	19.2 (66.6)	15.4 (59.7)	11.5 (52.7)	7.1 (44.8)	4.0 (39.2)	10.9 (51.6)
Mean daily minimum °C (°F)	0.1 (32.2)	0.1 (32.2)	1.4 (34.5)	3.8 (38.8)	7.1 (44.8)	10.6 (51.1)	12.5 (54.5)	12.7 (54.9)	9.2 (48.6)	7.0 (44.6)	4.0 (39.2)	1.3 (34.3)	5.8 (42.5)
Record low °C (°F)	−14.4 (6.1)	−15.3 (4.5)	−9.1 (15.6)	−5.8 (21.6)	−2.2 (28.0)	1.9 (35.4)	2.9 (37.2)	3.8 (38.8)	−0.3 (31.5)	−4.7 (23.5)	−8.0 (17.6)	−15.7 (3.7)	−15.7 (3.7)
Average precipitation mm (inches)	91.8 (3.61)	70.4 (2.77)	59.1 (2.33)	42.9 (1.69)	67.2 (2.65)	80.2 (3.16)	56.1 (2.21)	65.7 (2.59)	67.1 (2.64)	75.1 (2.96)	76.0 (2.99)	102.7 (4.04)	854.3 (33.64)
Average precipitation days (≥ 1.0 mm)	14.5	11.8	9.9	8.1	11.4	9.8	8.5	8.5	8.1	10.1	13.1	15.3	129.1
Source: Meteociel

== Population ==
Historical population
Year	Pop.	±% p.a.
1968	418	—
1975	355	−2.31%
1982	359	+0.16%
1990	387	+0.94%
1999	383	−0.12%
2007	396	+0.42%
2012	397	+0.05%
2017	374	−1.19%
2023	375	+0.04%
Source: INSEE

== See also ==
- Communes of the Meuse department
