= Brabant-sur-Meuse =

- Commune
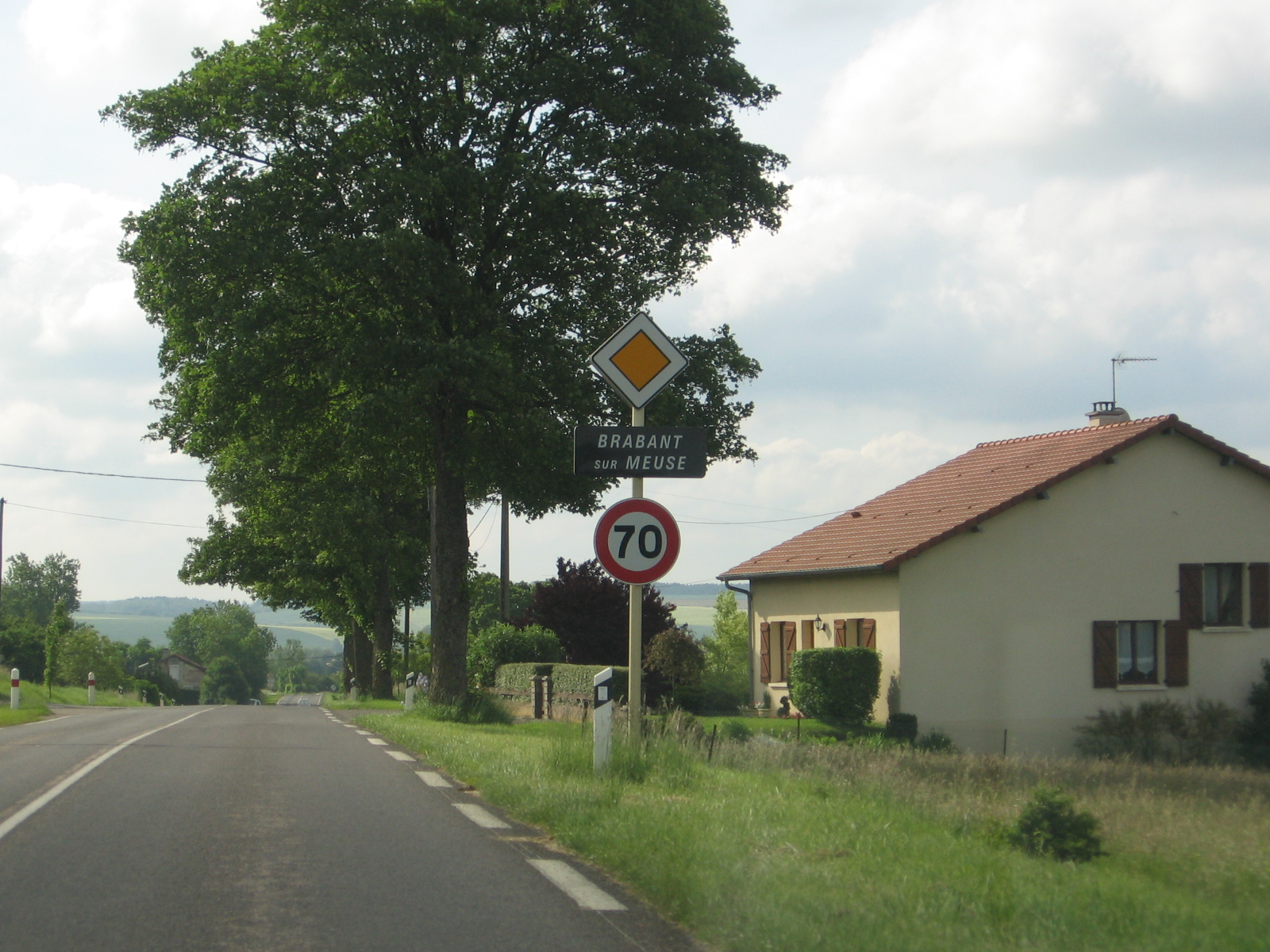
- The road into Brabant-sur-Meuse

- Coat of arms
- Location of Brabant-sur-Meuse
- Location within France Location within Grand Est
- Coordinates: 49°16′25″N 5°18′43″E
- Country: France
- Region: Grand Est
- Department: Meuse
- Arrondissement: Verdun
- Canton: Clermont-en-Argonne

Government
  - Mayor (2020–2026): Christian Magisson
- Area^{1}: 6.9 km^{2} (2.7 sq mi)
- Elevation: 210 m (690 ft)
- Highest elevation: 337 m (1,106 ft)
- Lowest elevation: 180 m (590 ft)
- Population (2023): 118
  - Density: 17/km^{2} (44/sq mi)
- Time zone: UTC+01:00 (CET)
  - Summer (DST): UTC+02:00 (CEST)
- INSEE/Postal code: 55070 /55100
- ^{1} French Land Register data, which excludes lakes, ponds, glaciers > 1 km^{2} (0.386 sq mi or 247 acres) and river estuaries.

Brabant-sur-Meuse (French pronunciation: [bʁabɑ̃ syʁ møz], literally Brabant on Meuse) is a commune in the Meuse department in Grand Est in northeastern France.

== Population ==
Historical population
Year	Pop.	±% p.a.
1968	90	—
1975	72	−3.14%
1982	75	+0.58%
1990	74	−0.17%
1999	90	+2.20%
2007	121	+3.77%
2012	130	+1.45%
2017	124	−0.94%
2023	118	−0.82%
Source: INSEE

== See also ==
- Communes of the Meuse department
