= Boureuilles =

- Commune
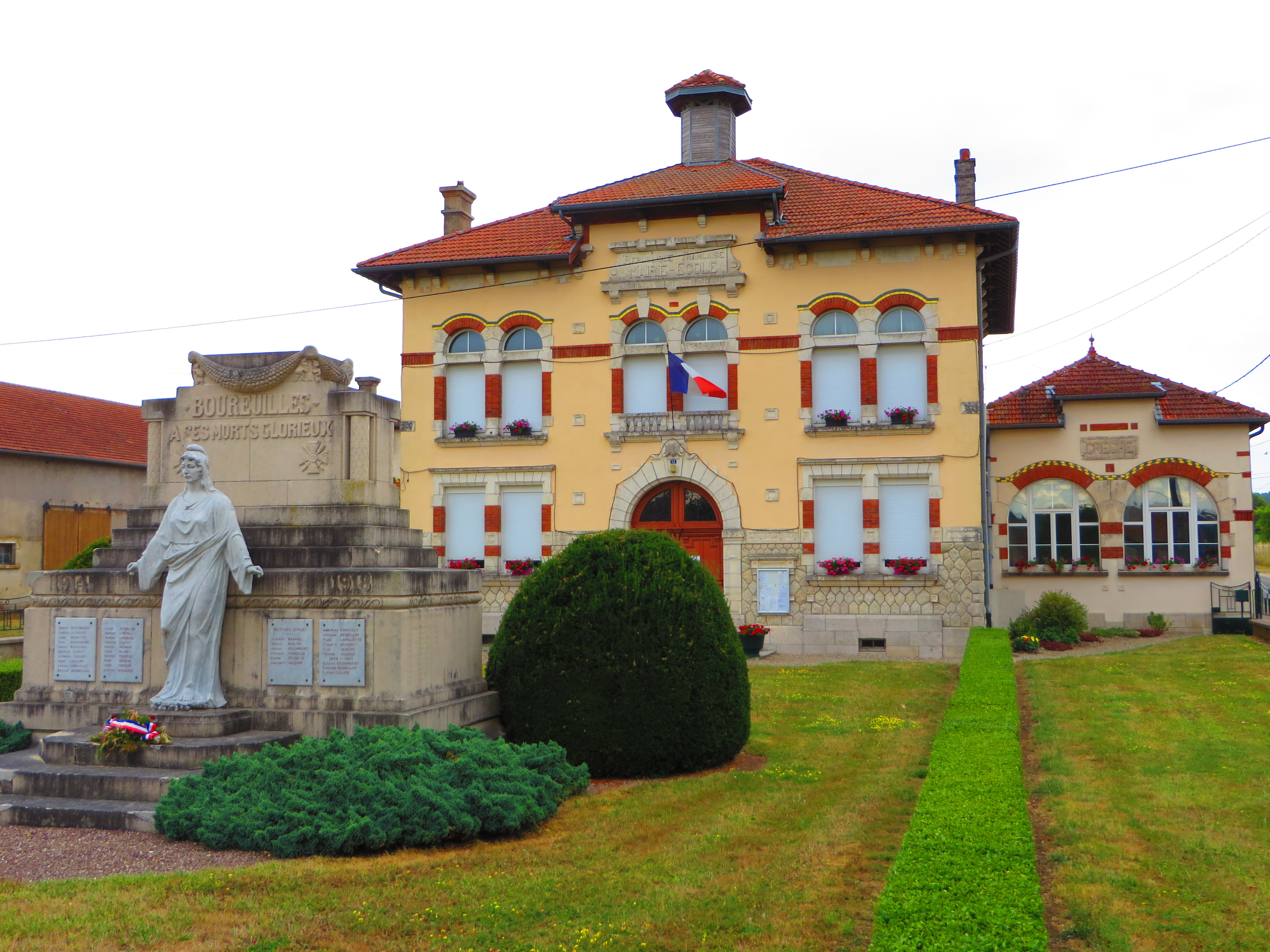
- The town hall in Boureuilles

- Coat of arms
- Location of Boureuilles
- Location within France Location within Grand Est
- Coordinates: 49°11′50″N 5°02′36″E
- Country: France
- Region: Grand Est
- Department: Meuse
- Arrondissement: Verdun
- Canton: Clermont-en-Argonne
- Intercommunality: Argonne-Meuse

Government
  - Mayor (2020–2026): Nadine Peureux
- Area^{1}: 21.33 km^{2} (8.24 sq mi)
- Elevation: 167 m (548 ft)
- Highest elevation: 283 m (928 ft)
- Lowest elevation: 138 m (453 ft)
- Population (2023): 118
  - Density: 5.53/km^{2} (14.3/sq mi)
- Time zone: UTC+01:00 (CET)
  - Summer (DST): UTC+02:00 (CEST)
- INSEE/Postal code: 55065 /55270
- ^{1} French Land Register data, which excludes lakes, ponds, glaciers > 1 km^{2} (0.386 sq mi or 247 acres) and river estuaries.

Boureuilles (French pronunciation: [buʁœj]) is a commune in the Meuse department in Grand Est in northeastern France.

== Population ==
Historical population
Year	Pop.	±% p.a.
1968	134	—
1975	121	−1.45%
1982	118	−0.36%
1990	119	+0.11%
1999	118	−0.09%
2007	125	+0.72%
2012	123	−0.32%
2017	120	−0.49%
2023	118	−0.28%
Source: INSEE

== See also ==
- Communes of the Meuse department
