= Cierges-sous-Montfaucon =

- Commune
- Coat of arms
- Location of Cierges-sous-Montfaucon
- Location within France Location within Grand Est
- Coordinates: 49°17′54″N 5°05′38″E
- Country: France
- Region: Grand Est
- Department: Meuse
- Arrondissement: Verdun
- Canton: Clermont-en-Argonne
- Intercommunality: Argonne-Meuse

Government
  - Mayor (2020–2026): Pierre De Vreese
- Area^{1}: 9.15 km^{2} (3.53 sq mi)
- Elevation: 217 m (712 ft)
- Highest elevation: 266 m (873 ft)
- Lowest elevation: 205 m (673 ft)
- Population (2023): 47
  - Density: 5.1/km^{2} (13/sq mi)
- Time zone: UTC+01:00 (CET)
  - Summer (DST): UTC+02:00 (CEST)
- INSEE/Postal code: 55115 /55270
- ^{1} French Land Register data, which excludes lakes, ponds, glaciers > 1 km^{2} (0.386 sq mi or 247 acres) and river estuaries.

Cierges-sous-Montfaucon (French pronunciation: [sjɛʁʒ su mɔ̃fokɔ̃]) is a commune in the Meuse department in Grand Est in north-eastern France.

== See also ==
- Communes of the Meuse department
