= Charpentry =

- Commune
- Coat of arms
- Location of Charpentry
- Location within France Location within Grand Est
- Coordinates: 49°15′32″N 5°01′52″E
- Country: France
- Region: Grand Est
- Department: Meuse
- Arrondissement: Verdun
- Canton: Clermont-en-Argonne
- Intercommunality: Argonne-Meuse

Government
  - Mayor (2020–2026): Arnaud Deroche
- Area^{1}: 4.41 km^{2} (1.70 sq mi)
- Elevation: 206 m (676 ft)
- Highest elevation: 226 m (741 ft)
- Lowest elevation: 147 m (482 ft)
- Population (2023): 24
  - Density: 5.4/km^{2} (14/sq mi)
- Time zone: UTC+01:00 (CET)
  - Summer (DST): UTC+02:00 (CEST)
- INSEE/Postal code: 55103 /55270
- ^{1} French Land Register data, which excludes lakes, ponds, glaciers > 1 km^{2} (0.386 sq mi or 247 acres) and river estuaries.

Charpentry (French pronunciation: [ʃaʁpɑ̃tʁi]) is a commune in the Meuse department in Grand Est in north-eastern France.

== History ==
At the beginning of the Meuse-Argonne Offensive (26 September – 11 November 1918), the 79th US Infantry Division captured Charpentry.

== Geography ==
Charpentry is a rural commune located on the La Bunate Creek. Which flows south of the commune. The hills north-east of town go up to 206 Meters (679 feet).

== See also ==
- Communes of the Meuse department
