= Neuvilly-en-Argonne =

- Commune
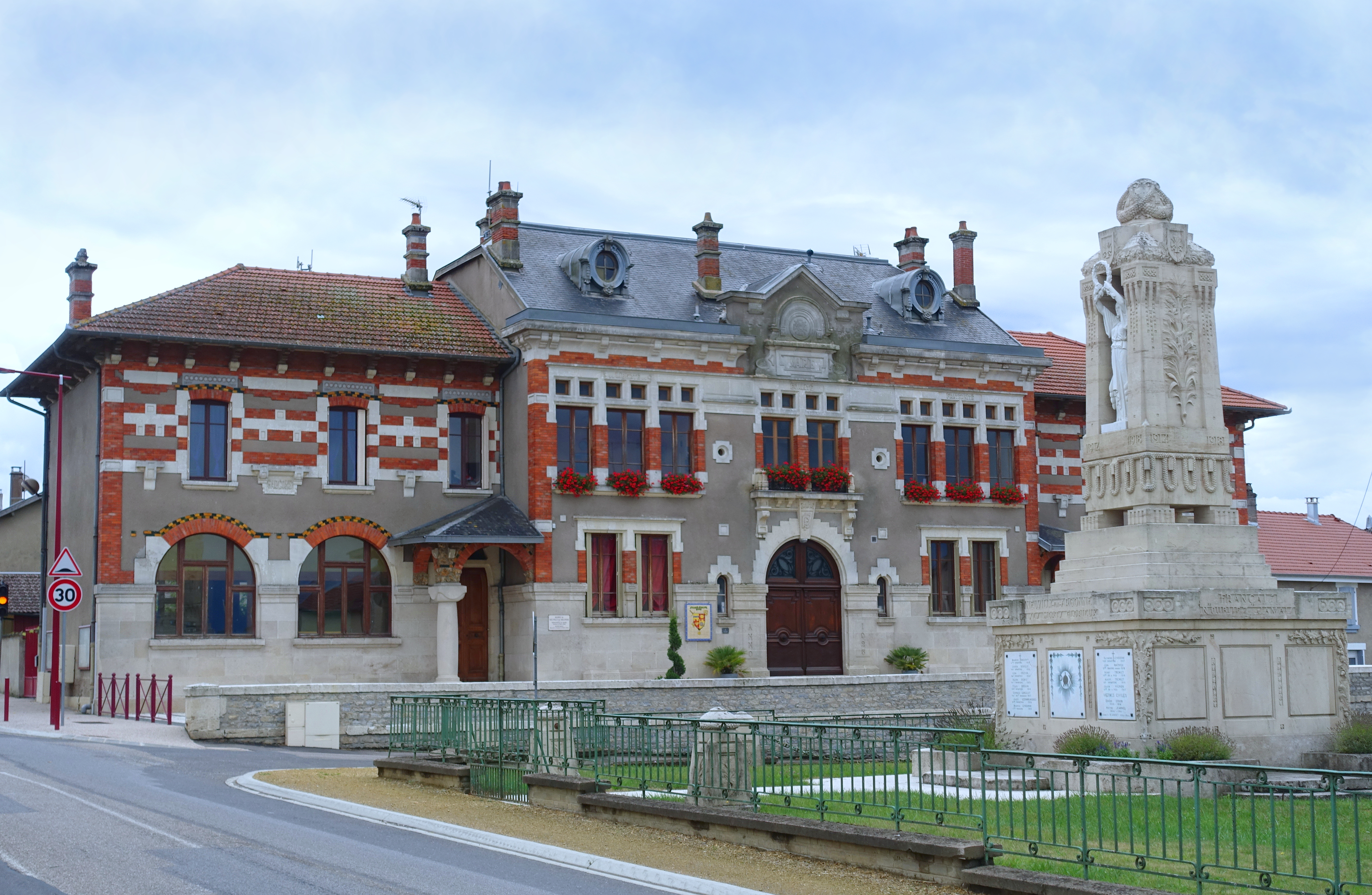
- Town hall

- Coat of arms
- Location of Neuvilly-en-Argonne
- Location within France Location within Grand Est
- Coordinates: 49°09′42″N 5°03′34″E
- Country: France
- Region: Grand Est
- Department: Meuse
- Arrondissement: Verdun
- Canton: Clermont-en-Argonne
- Intercommunality: CC Argonne-Meuse

Government
  - Mayor (2023–2026): Alain Jeannesson
- Area^{1}: 18.32 km^{2} (7.07 sq mi)
- Elevation: 182 m (597 ft)
- Highest elevation: 288 m (945 ft)
- Lowest elevation: 147 m (482 ft)
- Population (2023): 232
  - Density: 12.7/km^{2} (32.8/sq mi)
- Time zone: UTC+01:00 (CET)
  - Summer (DST): UTC+02:00 (CEST)
- INSEE/Postal code: 55383 /55120
- ^{1} French Land Register data, which excludes lakes, ponds, glaciers > 1 km^{2} (0.386 sq mi or 247 acres) and river estuaries.

Neuvilly-en-Argonne is a commune in the Meuse department in Grand Est in north-eastern France.

== History ==
World War I. The Battle of the Meuse-Argonne was fought in this region. The 35th Division Field Hospital 140, Sanitary Train Division 110 established a triage center in the bombed out church. The time frame would have been between September 1918 and October 1918.

== See also ==
- Communes of the Meuse department
