= Dannevoux =

- Commune
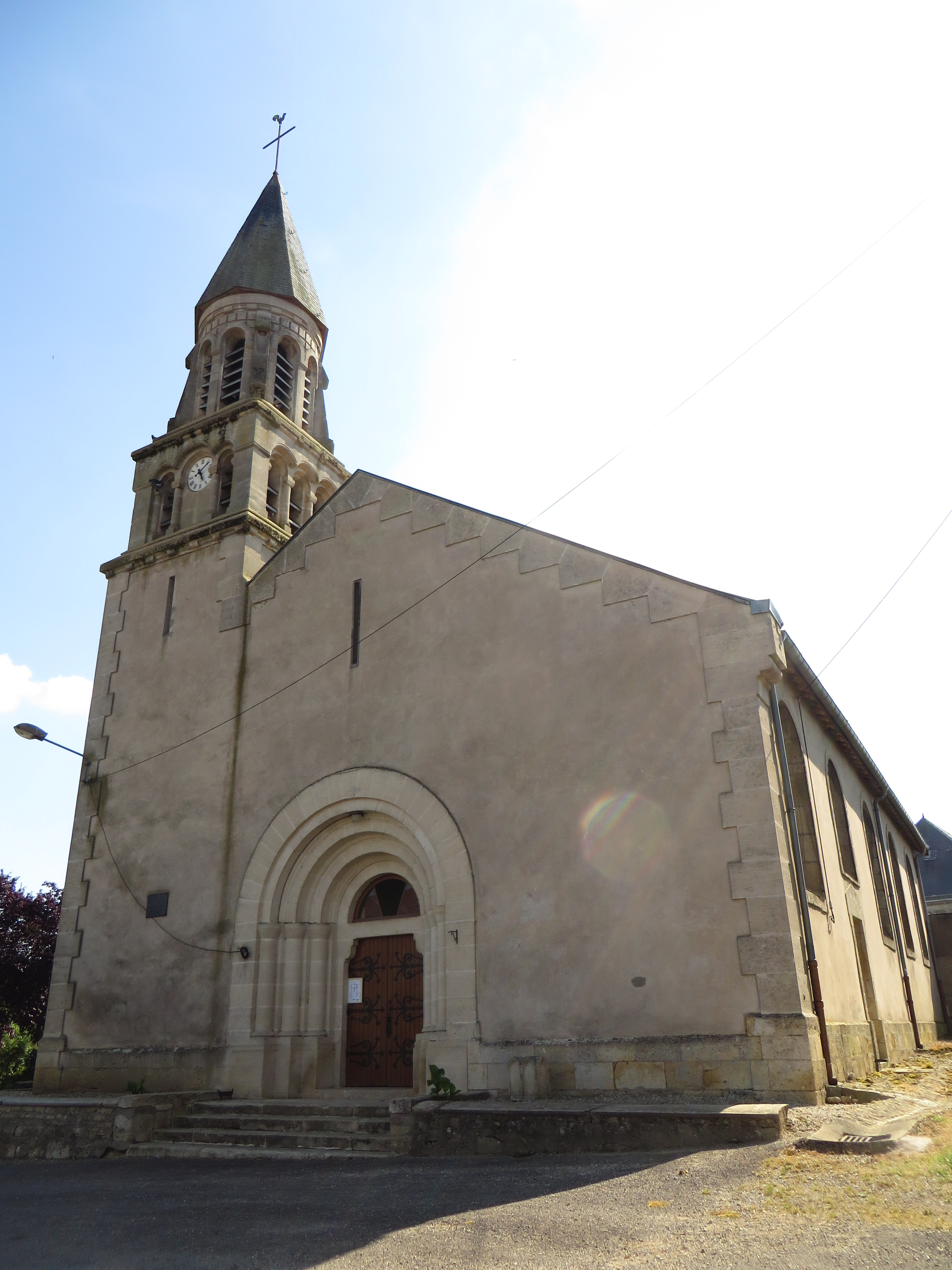
- The church in Dannevoux

- Coat of arms
- Location of Dannevoux
- Location within France Location within Grand Est
- Coordinates: 49°18′31″N 5°14′10″E
- Country: France
- Region: Grand Est
- Department: Meuse
- Arrondissement: Verdun
- Canton: Clermont-en-Argonne
- Intercommunality: CC du Pays de Stenay et du Val Dunois

Government
  - Mayor (2020–2026): Michel Vuillaume
- Area^{1}: 14.4 km^{2} (5.6 sq mi)
- Elevation: 183 m (600 ft)
- Highest elevation: 297 m (974 ft)
- Lowest elevation: 177 m (581 ft)
- Population (2023): 188
  - Density: 13.1/km^{2} (33.8/sq mi)
- Time zone: UTC+01:00 (CET)
  - Summer (DST): UTC+02:00 (CEST)
- INSEE/Postal code: 55146 /55110
- ^{1} French Land Register data, which excludes lakes, ponds, glaciers > 1 km^{2} (0.386 sq mi or 247 acres) and river estuaries.

Dannevoux (French pronunciation: [danvu]) is a commune in the Meuse department in Grand Est in north-eastern France.

== See also ==
- Communes of the Meuse department
