= Futeau =

- Commune
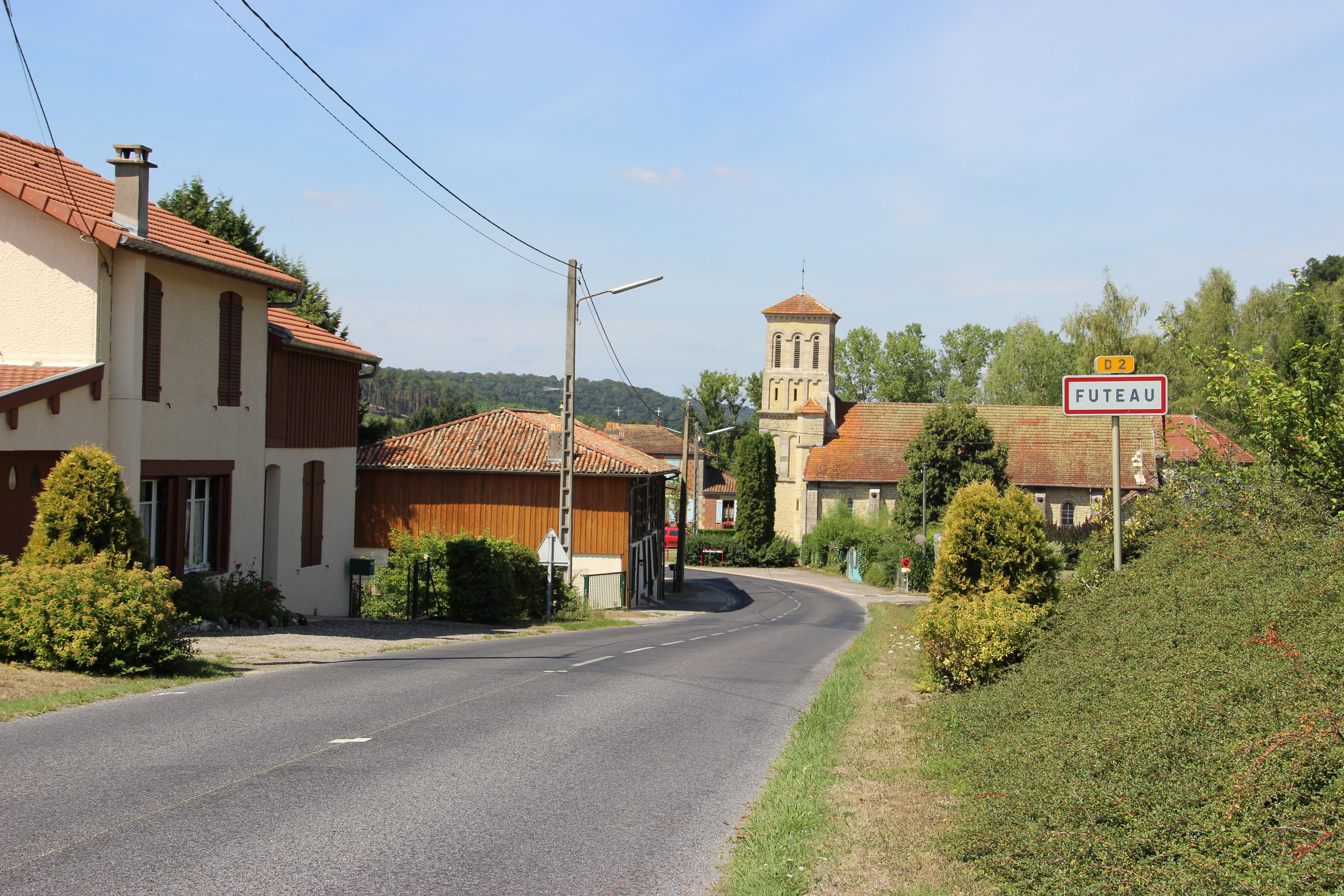
- The road into Futeau
- Location of Futeau
- Location within France Location within Grand Est
- Coordinates: 49°04′44″N 5°00′11″E
- Country: France
- Region: Grand Est
- Department: Meuse
- Arrondissement: Verdun
- Canton: Clermont-en-Argonne
- Intercommunality: CC Argonne-Meuse

Government
  - Mayor (2020–2026): Michel Fosse
- Area^{1}: 1.73 km^{2} (0.67 sq mi)
- Elevation: 180 m (590 ft)
- Highest elevation: 211 m (692 ft)
- Lowest elevation: 165 m (541 ft)
- Population (2023): 145
  - Density: 83.8/km^{2} (217/sq mi)
- Time zone: UTC+01:00 (CET)
  - Summer (DST): UTC+02:00 (CEST)
- INSEE/Postal code: 55202 /55120
- ^{1} French Land Register data, which excludes lakes, ponds, glaciers > 1 km^{2} (0.386 sq mi or 247 acres) and river estuaries.

Futeau (French pronunciation: [fyto]) is a commune in the Meuse department in Grand Est in north-eastern France.

== See also ==
- Communes of the Meuse department
