= Le Claon =

- Commune
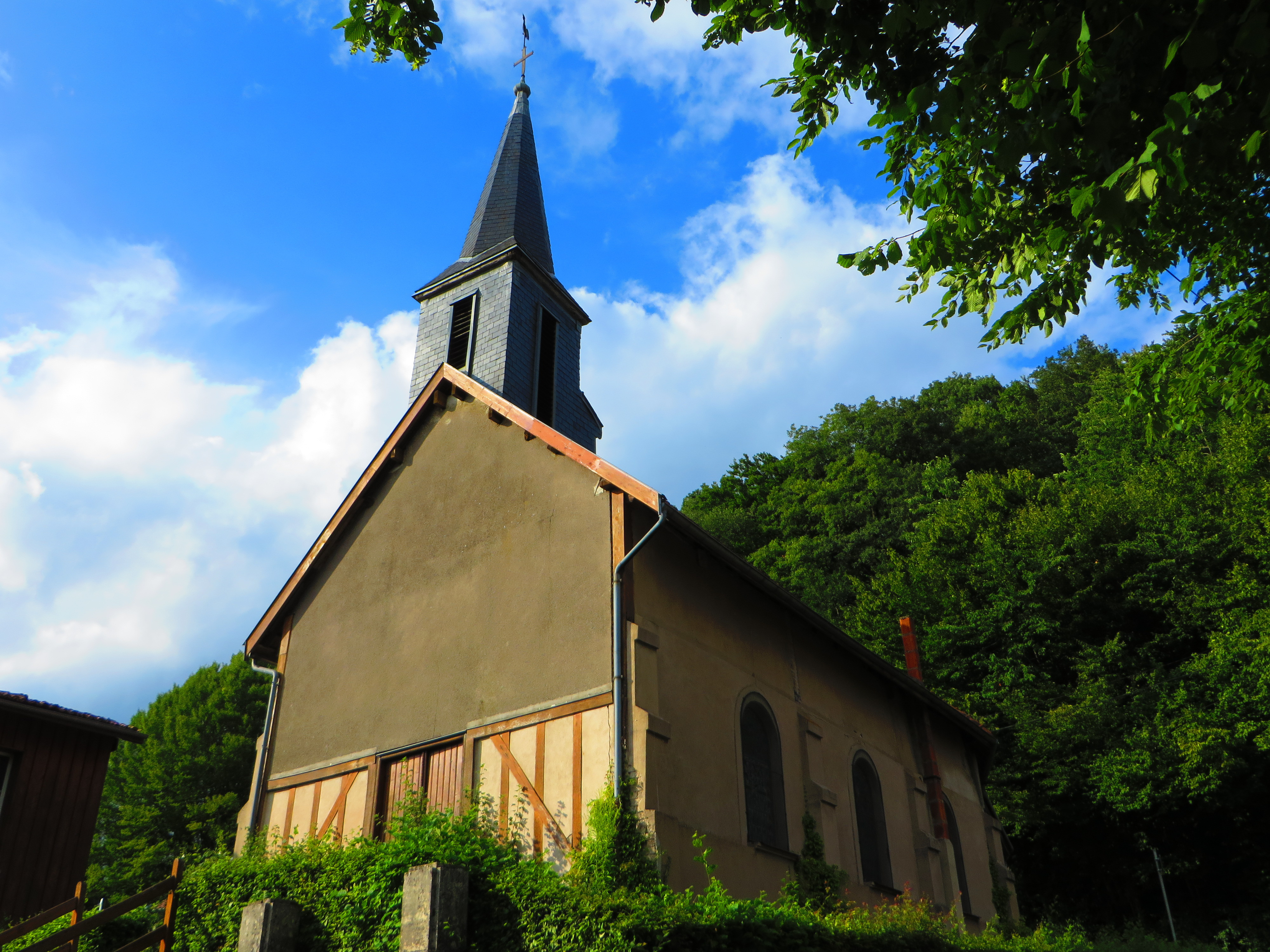
- The church in Le Claon

- Coat of arms
- Location of Le Claon
- Location within France Location within Grand Est
- Coordinates: 49°08′35″N 4°58′23″E
- Country: France
- Region: Grand Est
- Department: Meuse
- Arrondissement: Verdun
- Canton: Clermont-en-Argonne
- Intercommunality: CC Argonne-Meuse

Government
  - Mayor (2020–2026): Laurent Dequenne
- Area^{1}: 7.32 km^{2} (2.83 sq mi)
- Elevation: 160 m (520 ft)
- Highest elevation: 270 m (890 ft)
- Lowest elevation: 147 m (482 ft)
- Population (2023): 46
  - Density: 6.3/km^{2} (16/sq mi)
- Time zone: UTC+01:00 (CET)
  - Summer (DST): UTC+02:00 (CEST)
- INSEE/Postal code: 55116 /55120
- ^{1} French Land Register data, which excludes lakes, ponds, glaciers > 1 km^{2} (0.386 sq mi or 247 acres) and river estuaries.

Le Claon is a commune in the Meuse department in Grand Est in north-eastern France.

== See also ==
- Communes of the Meuse department
