= Sivry-sur-Meuse =

- Commune
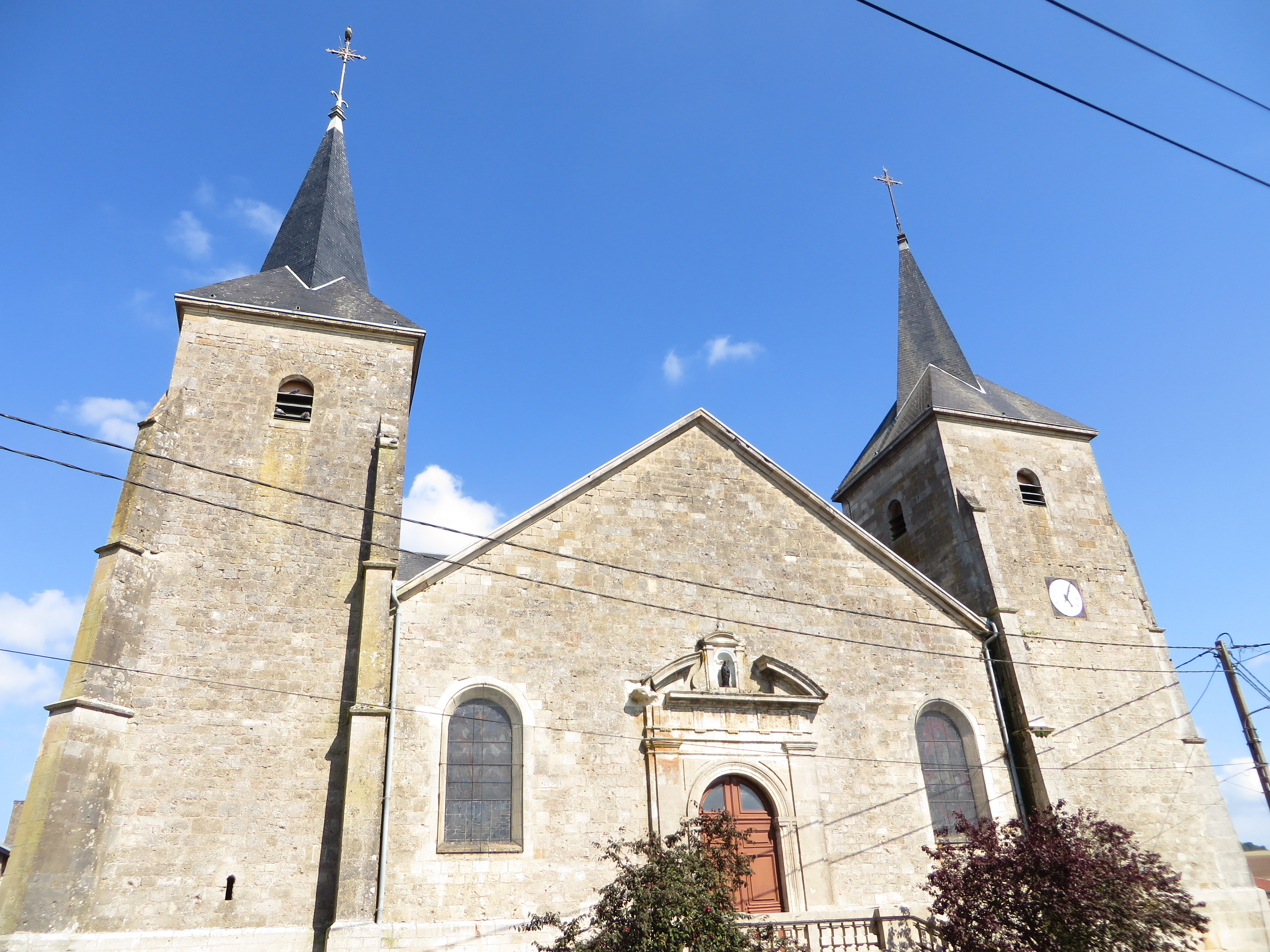
- The church in Sivry-sur-Meuse

- Coat of arms
- Location of Sivry-sur-Meuse
- Location within France Location within Grand Est
- Coordinates: 49°19′22″N 5°16′09″E
- Country: France
- Region: Grand Est
- Department: Meuse
- Arrondissement: Verdun
- Canton: Clermont-en-Argonne
- Intercommunality: CC du Pays de Stenay et du Val Dunois

Government
  - Mayor (2020–2026): Claude Vénante
- Area^{1}: 22.24 km^{2} (8.59 sq mi)
- Elevation: 185 m (607 ft)
- Highest elevation: 376 m (1,234 ft)
- Lowest elevation: 177 m (581 ft)
- Population (2023): 341
  - Density: 15.3/km^{2} (39.7/sq mi)
- Time zone: UTC+01:00 (CET)
  - Summer (DST): UTC+02:00 (CEST)
- INSEE/Postal code: 55490 /55110
- ^{1} French Land Register data, which excludes lakes, ponds, glaciers > 1 km^{2} (0.386 sq mi or 247 acres) and river estuaries.

Sivry-sur-Meuse (French pronunciation: [sivʁi syʁ møz], literally Sivry on Meuse) is a commune in the Meuse department in Grand Est in north-eastern France. Sivry-sur-Meuse was invaded in World War 1. Most of the houses were damaged in the Battle of Verdun.

== See also ==
- Communes of the Meuse department
