= 12th Reserve Division =

Imperial German Army unit in WWI

12th Reserve Division (12. Reserve-Division)
- Active: 1914-1919
- Country: Germany
- Branch: Army
- Type: Infantry
- Size: Approx. 15,000
- Engagements: World War I: Great Retreat, Battle of Verdun, Battle of the Somme, Battle of Delville Wood, Battle of Arras (1917)

12th Reserve Division (12. Reserve-Division) was a unit of the Imperial German Army in World War I. The division was formed on mobilization of the German Army in August 1914 as part of VI Reserve Corps. The division was disbanded in 1919 during the demobilization of the German Army after World War I. The division was recruited in the Province of Silesia, mainly Upper Silesia.

== Combat chronicle ==
The 12th Reserve Division fought on the Western Front, participating in the opening German offensive which led to the Allied Great Retreat. Thereafter, the division remained in the line in the Verdun region until February 1916, when it entered the Battle of Verdun. The division later fought in the Battle of the Somme. It remained in the Flanders-Artois region for the rest of the war, and fought in the Battle of Passchendaele in 1917. Allied intelligence rated the division as second class.

== Order of battle on mobilization ==
The order of battle of the 12th Reserve Division on mobilization was as follows:

- 22. Reserve-Infanterie-Brigade
  - Reserve-Infanterie-Regiment von Winterfeldt (2. Oberschlesisches) Nr.23
  - Reserve-Infanterie-Regiment Nr. 38
  - Reserve-Jäger-Bataillon Nr. 6
- 23. Reserve-Infanterie-Brigade
  - Reserve-Infanterie-Regiment Nr. 22
  - Reserve-Infanterie-Regiment Nr. 51
- Reserve-Ulanen-Regiment Nr. 4
- Reserve-Feldartillerie-Regiment Nr. 12
- 1.Reserve-Kompanie/Pionier-Bataillon Nr. 6
- 2.Reserve-Kompanie/Pionier-Bataillon Nr. 6

== Order of battle on February 20, 1918 ==
The 12th Reserve Division was triangularized in April 1915. Over the course of the war, other changes took place, including the formation of artillery and signals commands and a pioneer battalion. The order of battle on February 20, 1918, was as follows:

- 22. Reserve-Infanterie-Brigade
  - Reserve-Infanterie-Regiment Nr. 23
  - Reserve-Infanterie-Regiment Nr. 38
  - Reserve-Infanterie-Regiment Nr. 51
- 2.Eskadron/Reserve-Husaren-Regiment Nr. 4
- Artillerie-Kommandeur 99
  - Reserve-Feldartillerie-Regiment Nr. 12
- Pionier-Bataillon Nr. 312
- Divisions-Nachrichten-Kommandeur 412
