= Gercourt-et-Drillancourt =

- Commune
- Coat of arms
- Location of Gercourt-et-Drillancourt
- Location within France Location within Grand Est
- Coordinates: 49°17′09″N 5°14′20″E
- Country: France
- Region: Grand Est
- Department: Meuse
- Arrondissement: Verdun
- Canton: Clermont-en-Argonne
- Intercommunality: Argonne-Meuse

Government
  - Mayor (2020–2026): Cyril Lecourtier
- Area^{1}: 13.6 km^{2} (5.3 sq mi)
- Elevation: 200 m (660 ft)
- Highest elevation: 276 m (906 ft)
- Lowest elevation: 180 m (590 ft)
- Population (2023): 125
  - Density: 9.19/km^{2} (23.8/sq mi)
- Time zone: UTC+01:00 (CET)
  - Summer (DST): UTC+02:00 (CEST)
- INSEE/Postal code: 55206 /55110
- ^{1} French Land Register data, which excludes lakes, ponds, glaciers > 1 km^{2} (0.386 sq mi or 247 acres) and river estuaries.

Gercourt-et-Drillancourt is a commune in the Meuse department in Grand Est in north-eastern France.

== See also ==
- Communes of the Meuse department
