= Vilosnes-Haraumont =

- Commune
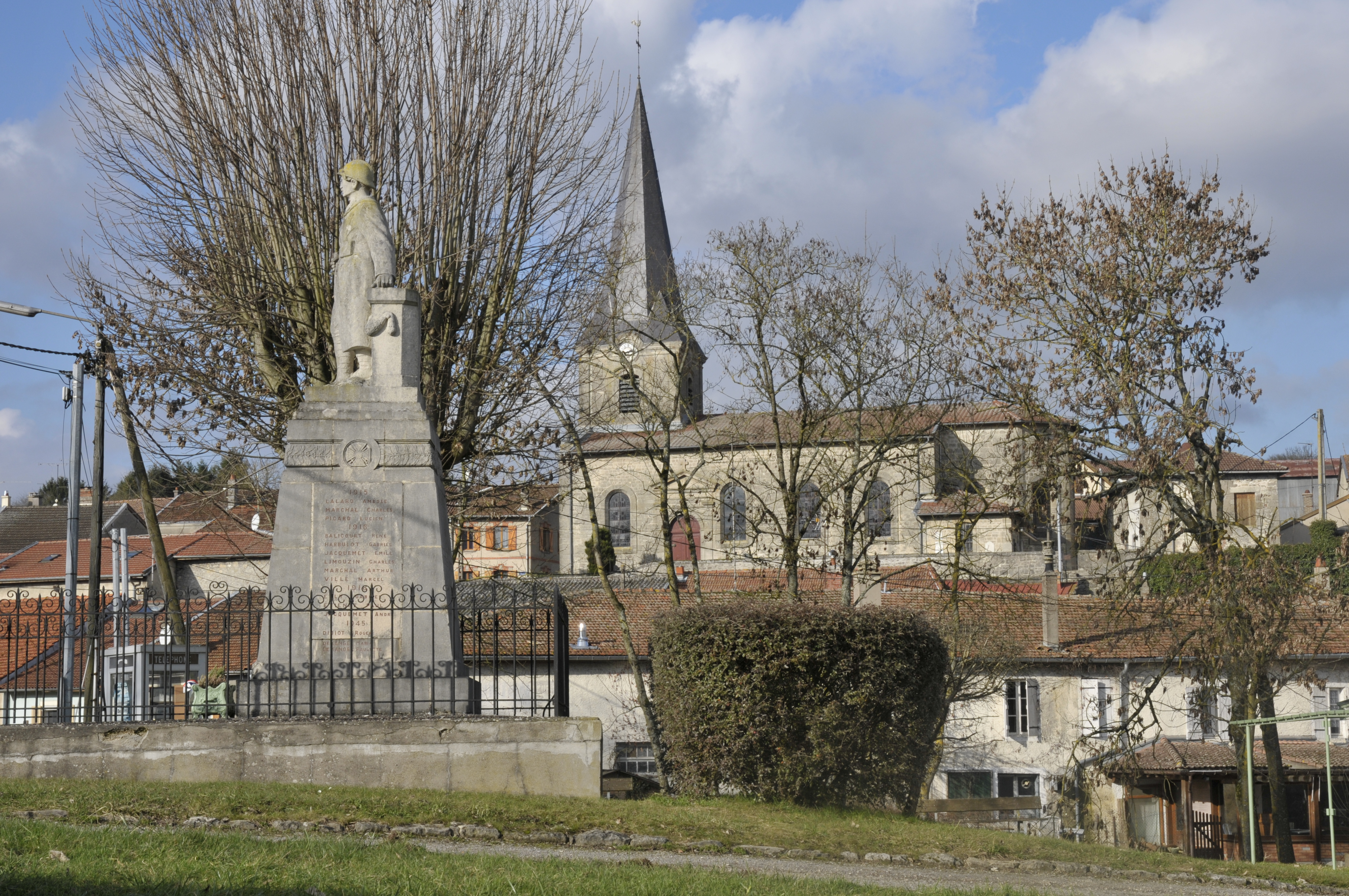
- Church and memorial in Vilosnes-Haraumont

- Coat of arms
- Location of Vilosnes-Haraumont
- Location within France Location within Grand Est
- Coordinates: 49°19′48″N 5°13′58″E
- Country: France
- Region: Grand Est
- Department: Meuse
- Arrondissement: Verdun
- Canton: Clermont-en-Argonne
- Intercommunality: CC du Pays de Stenay et du Val Dunois

Government
  - Mayor (2020–2026): Gérard Vaudois
- Area^{1}: 15.41 km^{2} (5.95 sq mi)
- Highest elevation: 387 m (1,270 ft)
- Lowest elevation: 174 m (571 ft)
- Population (2023): 260
  - Density: 17/km^{2} (44/sq mi)
- Time zone: UTC+01:00 (CET)
  - Summer (DST): UTC+02:00 (CEST)
- INSEE/Postal code: 55571 /55110
- ^{1} French Land Register data, which excludes lakes, ponds, glaciers > 1 km^{2} (0.386 sq mi or 247 acres) and river estuaries.

Vilosnes-Haraumont (French pronunciation: [vilon aʁomɔ̃]) is a commune in the Meuse department in Grand Est in north-eastern France. It was created in 1973 by the merger of two former communes: Vilosnes and Haraumont.

== See also ==
- Communes of the Meuse department
