= Brocourt-en-Argonne =

- Commune
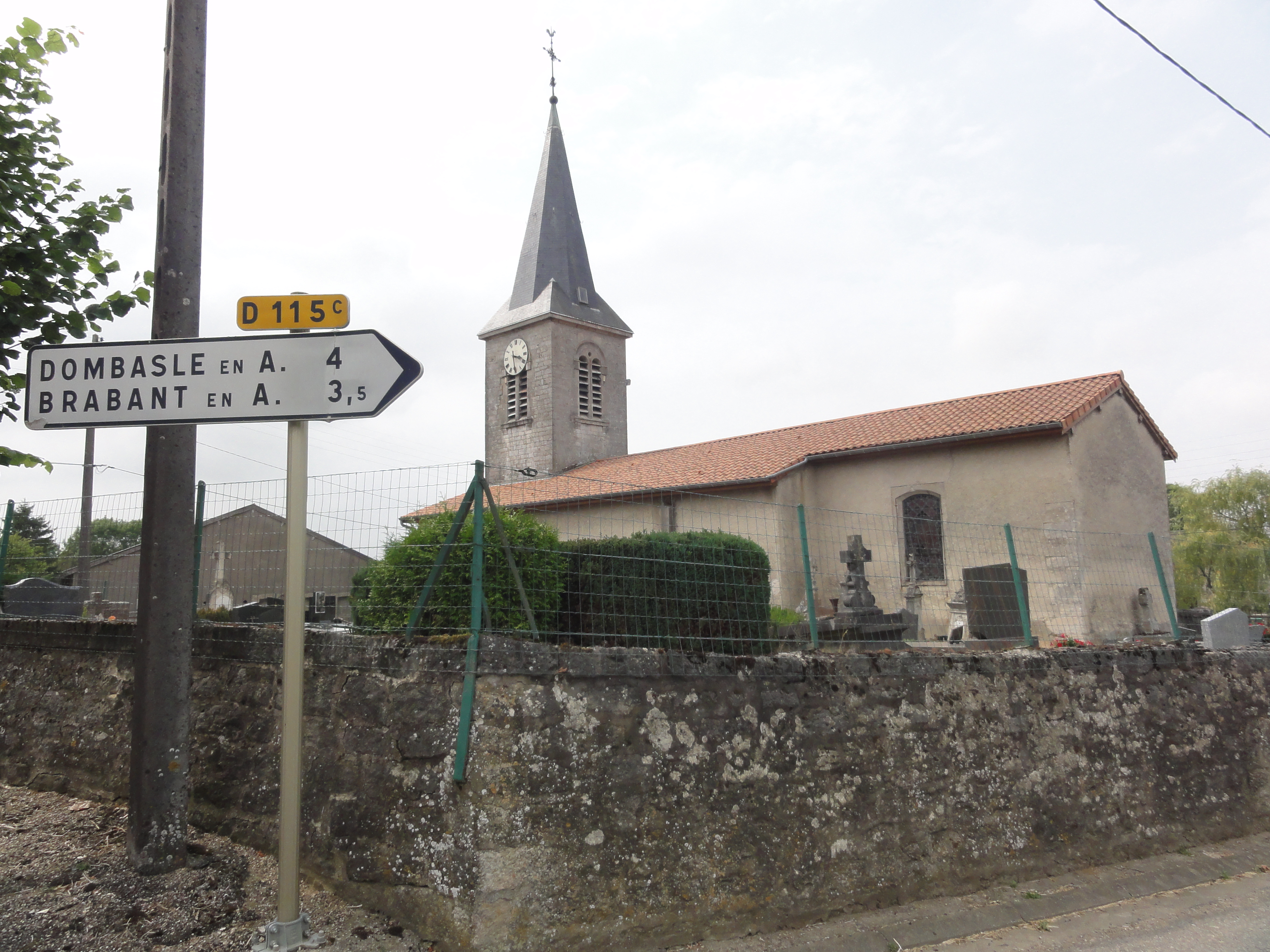
- The church in Brocourt-en-Argonne
- Location of Brocourt-en-Argonne
- Location within France Location within Grand Est
- Coordinates: 49°06′54″N 5°10′01″E
- Country: France
- Region: Grand Est
- Department: Meuse
- Arrondissement: Verdun
- Canton: Clermont-en-Argonne

Government
  - Mayor (2023–2026): François Precheur
- Area^{1}: 6.7 km^{2} (2.6 sq mi)
- Highest elevation: 275 m (902 ft)
- Lowest elevation: 234 m (768 ft)
- Population (2023): 46
  - Density: 6.9/km^{2} (18/sq mi)
- Time zone: UTC+01:00 (CET)
  - Summer (DST): UTC+02:00 (CEST)
- INSEE/Postal code: 55082 /55120
- ^{1} French Land Register data, which excludes lakes, ponds, glaciers > 1 km^{2} (0.386 sq mi or 247 acres) and river estuaries.

Brocourt-en-Argonne (French pronunciation: [bʁɔkuʁ ɑ̃.n‿aʁɡɔn], literally Brocourt in Argonne) is a commune in the Meuse department in Grand Est in northeastern France.

== See also ==
- Communes of the Meuse department
