= Les Islettes =

- Commune
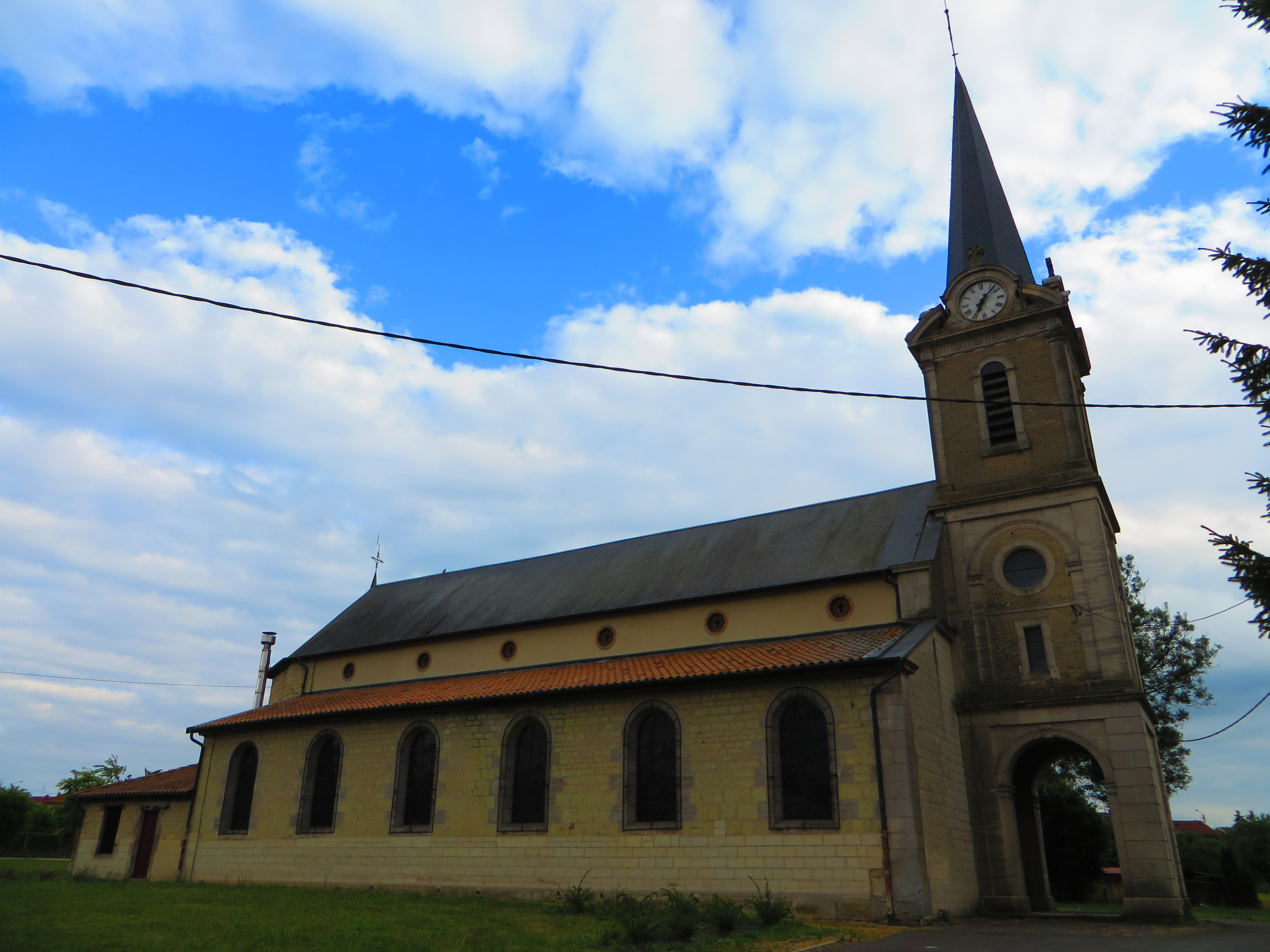
- The Church of the Nativity in Les Islettes

- Coat of arms
- Location of Les Islettes
- Location within France Location within Grand Est
- Coordinates: 49°06′41″N 5°00′14″E
- Country: France
- Region: Grand Est
- Department: Meuse
- Arrondissement: Verdun
- Canton: Clermont-en-Argonne
- Intercommunality: CC Argonne-Meuse

Government
  - Mayor (2020–2026): Ludovic Pochon
- Area^{1}: 5.55 km^{2} (2.14 sq mi)
- Elevation: 174 m (571 ft)
- Highest elevation: 245 m (804 ft)
- Lowest elevation: 156 m (512 ft)
- Population (2023): 695
  - Density: 125/km^{2} (324/sq mi)
- Time zone: UTC+01:00 (CET)
  - Summer (DST): UTC+02:00 (CEST)
- INSEE/Postal code: 55253 /55120
- ^{1} French Land Register data, which excludes lakes, ponds, glaciers > 1 km^{2} (0.386 sq mi or 247 acres) and river estuaries.

Les Islettes (French pronunciation: [le.z‿ilɛt]) is a commune in the Meuse department of Grand Est in north-eastern France.

== See also ==
- Communes of the Meuse department
