= Jouy-en-Argonne =

- Commune
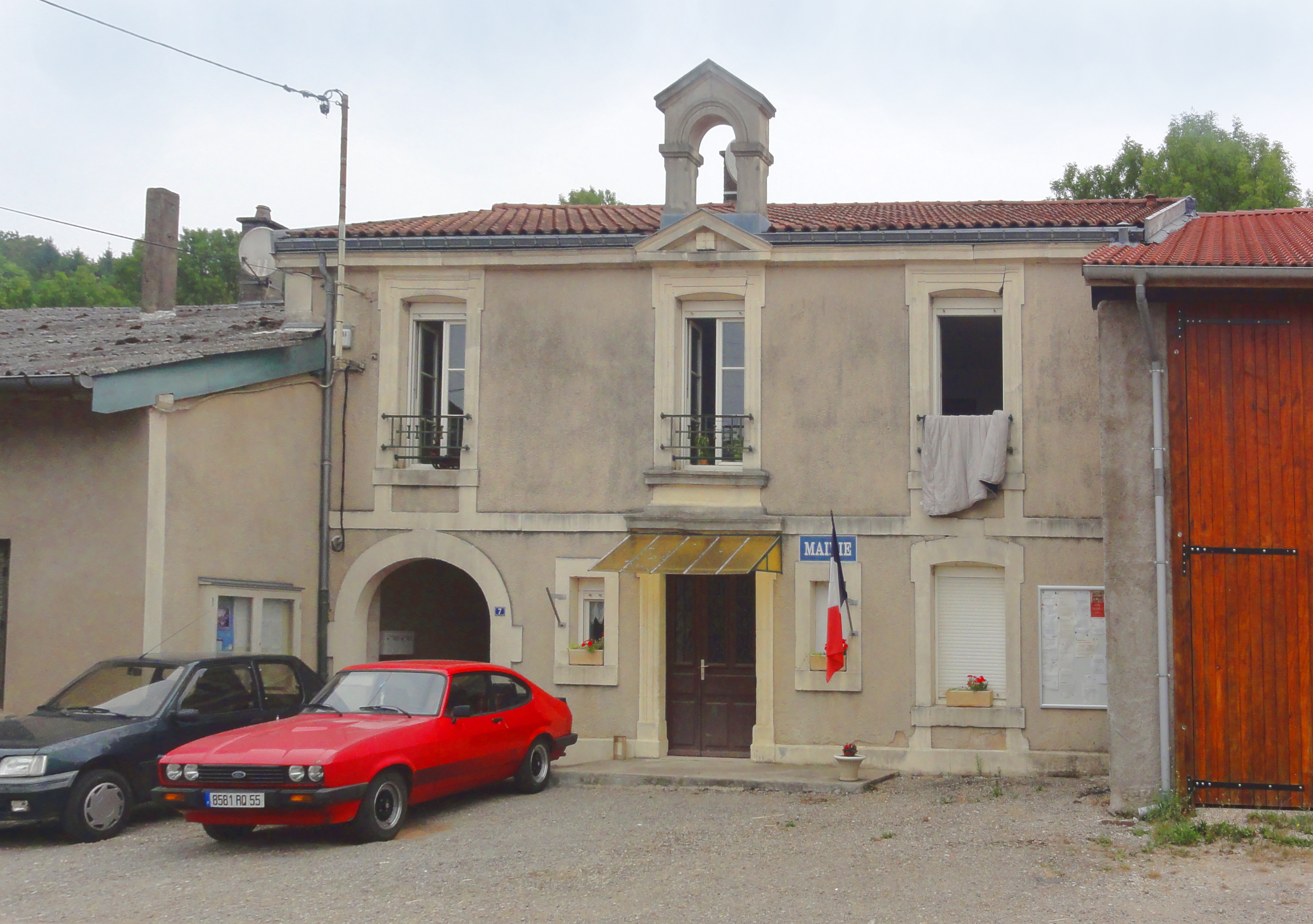
- The town hall in Jouy-en-Argonne
- Location of Jouy-en-Argonne
- Location within France Location within Grand Est
- Coordinates: 49°08′05″N 5°13′23″E
- Country: France
- Region: Grand Est
- Department: Meuse
- Arrondissement: Verdun
- Canton: Clermont-en-Argonne
- Intercommunality: CC Argonne-Meuse

Government
  - Mayor (2020–2026): Patricia Houckert
- Area^{1}: 6.30 km^{2} (2.43 sq mi)
- Elevation: 311 m (1,020 ft)
- Highest elevation: 336 m (1,102 ft)
- Lowest elevation: 217 m (712 ft)
- Population (2023): 61
  - Density: 9.7/km^{2} (25/sq mi)
- Time zone: UTC+01:00 (CET)
  - Summer (DST): UTC+02:00 (CEST)
- INSEE/Postal code: 55257 /55120
- ^{1} French Land Register data, which excludes lakes, ponds, glaciers > 1 km^{2} (0.386 sq mi or 247 acres) and river estuaries.

Jouy-en-Argonne (French pronunciation: [ʒwi ɑ̃.n‿aʁɡɔn], literally Jouy in Argonne) is a commune in the Meuse department in Grand Est in north-eastern France.

== See also ==
- Communes of the Meuse department
