= Épinonville =

- Commune
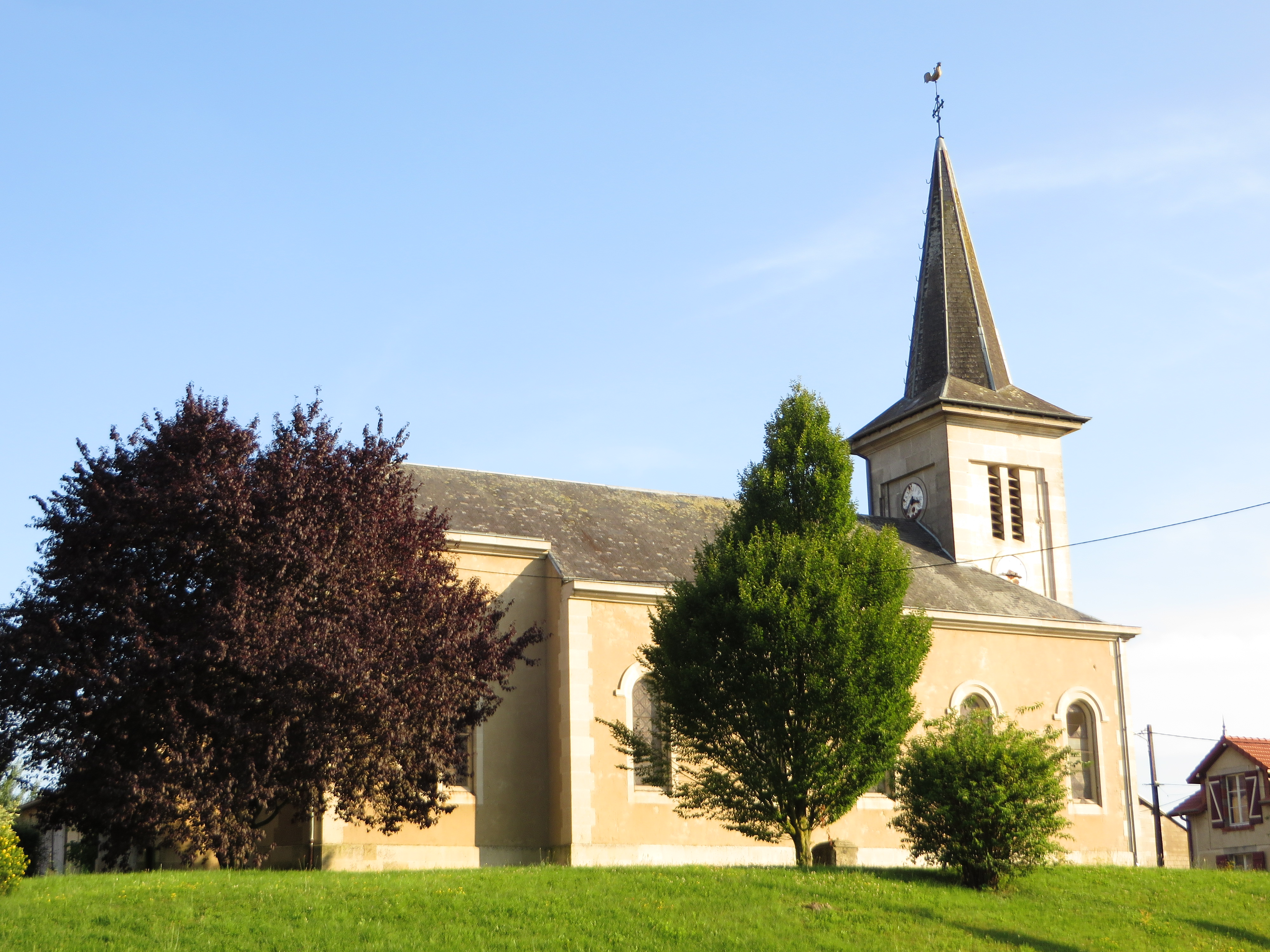
- The church in Épinonville

- Coat of arms
- Location of Épinonville
- Location within France Location within Grand Est
- Coordinates: 49°16′39″N 5°04′52″E
- Country: France
- Region: Grand Est
- Department: Meuse
- Arrondissement: Verdun
- Canton: Clermont-en-Argonne
- Intercommunality: Argonne-Meuse

Government
  - Mayor (2020–2026): Noëlle Job
- Area^{1}: 14.06 km^{2} (5.43 sq mi)
- Elevation: 210 m (690 ft)
- Highest elevation: 272 m (892 ft)
- Lowest elevation: 178 m (584 ft)
- Population (2023): 65
  - Density: 4.6/km^{2} (12/sq mi)
- Time zone: UTC+01:00 (CET)
  - Summer (DST): UTC+02:00 (CEST)
- INSEE/Postal code: 55174 /55270
- ^{1} French Land Register data, which excludes lakes, ponds, glaciers > 1 km^{2} (0.386 sq mi or 247 acres) and river estuaries.

Épinonville (French pronunciation: [epinɔ̃vil]) is a commune in the Meuse department in Grand Est in north-eastern France.

== See also ==
- Communes of the Meuse department
