= Le Neufour =

- Commune
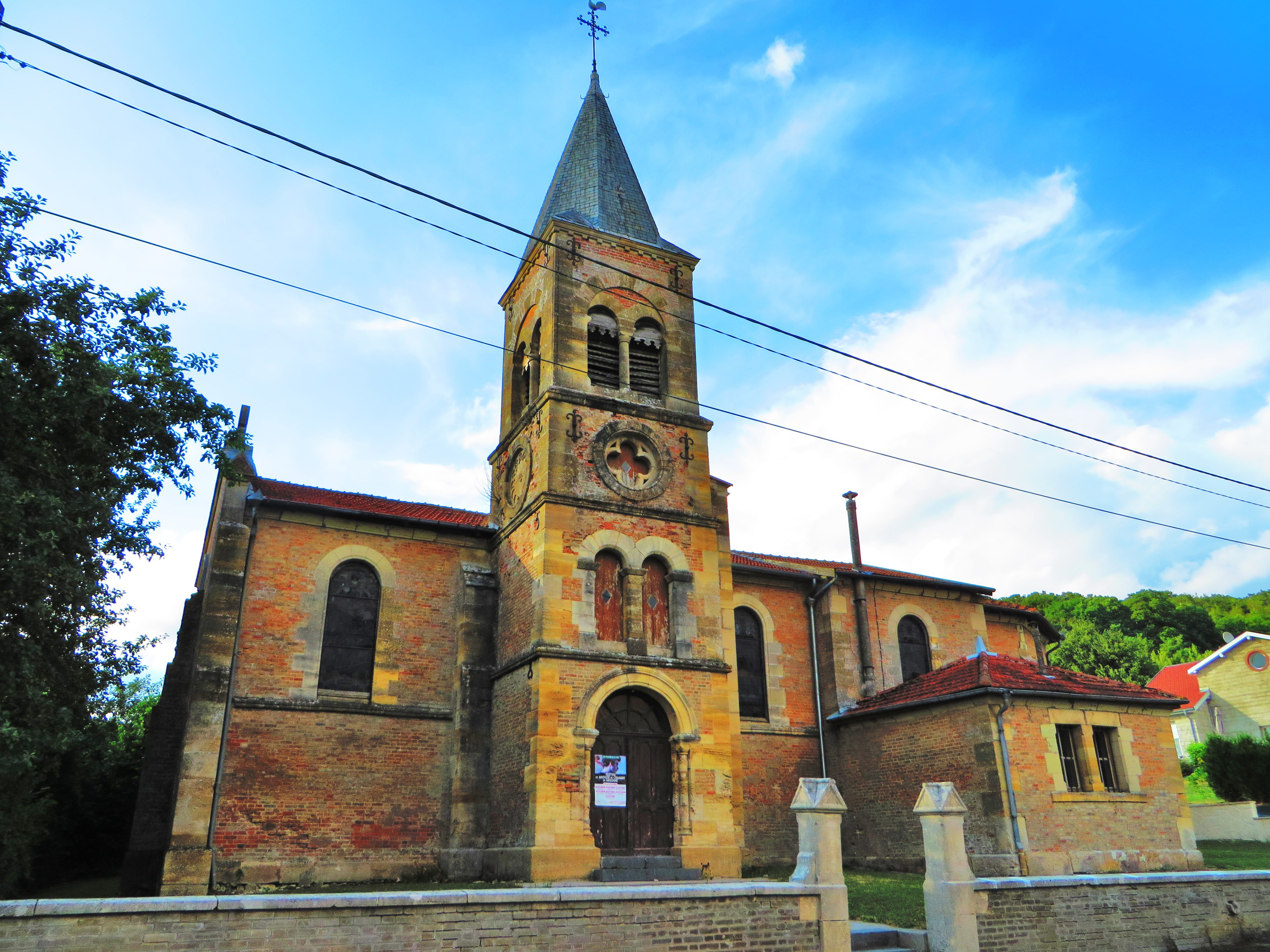
- The church in Le Neufour

- Coat of arms
- Location of Le Neufour
- Location within France Location within Grand Est
- Coordinates: 49°07′57″N 4°58′57″E
- Country: France
- Region: Grand Est
- Department: Meuse
- Arrondissement: Verdun
- Canton: Clermont-en-Argonne
- Intercommunality: CC Argonne-Meuse

Government
  - Mayor (2020–2026): Christian Ponsignon
- Area^{1}: 0.9 km^{2} (0.35 sq mi)
- Elevation: 151 m (495 ft)
- Highest elevation: 216 m (709 ft)
- Lowest elevation: 153 m (502 ft)
- Population (2023): 52
  - Density: 58/km^{2} (150/sq mi)
- Time zone: UTC+01:00 (CET)
  - Summer (DST): UTC+02:00 (CEST)
- INSEE/Postal code: 55379 /55120
- ^{1} French Land Register data, which excludes lakes, ponds, glaciers > 1 km^{2} (0.386 sq mi or 247 acres) and river estuaries.

Le Neufour (French pronunciation: [lə nœfuʁ]) is a commune in the Meuse department in Grand Est in north-eastern France.

== See also ==
- Communes of the Meuse department
