= 11th Reserve Division =

11th Reserve Division (11. Reserve-Division)
- Active: 1914-1919
- Country: German Empire
- Branch: Army
- Type: Infantry
- Size: Approx. 15,000
- Engagements: World War I: Great Retreat; Battle of Verdun; Battle of the Somme; Battle of Arras

The 11th Reserve Division (11. Reserve-Division) was a unit of the Imperial German Army in World War I. The division was formed on mobilization of the German Army in August 1914 as part of VI Reserve Corps. The division was disbanded in 1919 during the demobilization of the German Army after World War I. The division was recruited in the Province of Silesia, with some troops from other areas due to the large Polish population of Silesia. It received the regular 23rd Infantry Brigade from the 12th Division on mobilization.

== Combat chronicle ==
The 11th Reserve Division fought on the Western Front, participating in the opening German offensive which led to the Allied Great Retreat. Thereafter, the division remained in the line in the Verdun region until February 1916, when it entered the Battle of Verdun. The division later fought in the Battle of the Somme. It remained in the Flanders-Artois region for the rest of the war, and fought in the Battle of Arras in 1917. Allied intelligence rated the division as second class.

== Order of battle on mobilization ==
The order of battle of the 11th Reserve Division on mobilization was as follows:

- 23. Infanterie-Brigade
  - Infanterie-Regiment Keith (1. Oberschlesisches) Nr. 22
  - 3. Schlesisches Infanterie-Regiment Nr. 156
- 21. Reserve-Infanterie-Brigade
  - Reserve-Infanterie-Regiment Nr. 10
  - Reserve-Infanterie-Regiment Nr. 11
- Reserve-Husaren-Regiment Nr. 4
- Reserve-Feldartillerie-Regiment Nr. 11
- 4.Kompanie/Pionier-Bataillon Nr. 6

== Order of battle on October 19, 1918 ==
The 11th Reserve Division was triangularized in April 1915. Over the course of the war, other changes took place, including the formation of artillery and signals commands and a pioneer battalion. The order of battle on October 19, 1918, was as follows:

- 23. Infanterie-Brigade
  - Reserve-Infanterie-Regiment Nr. 10
  - Infanterie-Regiment Keith (1. Oberschlesisches) Nr. 22
  - 3. Schlesisches Infanterie-Regiment Nr. 156
- 1.Eskadron/Reserve-Husaren-Regiment Nr. 4
- Artillerie-Kommandeur 98
  - Schlesisches Reserve-Feldartillerie-Regiment Nr. 11
  - I.Bataillon/Reserve-Fußartillerie-Regiment Nr. 5
- Pionier-Bataillon Nr. 311
- Divisions-Nachrichten-Kommandeur 411
