= Baulny =

- Commune
- Coat of arms
- Location of Baulny
- Location within France Location within Grand Est
- Coordinates: 49°15′46″N 5°00′54″E
- Country: France
- Region: Grand Est
- Department: Meuse
- Arrondissement: Verdun
- Canton: Clermont-en-Argonne
- Intercommunality: Argonne-Meuse

Government
  - Mayor (2020–2026): Romain Jacquesson
- Area^{1}: 3.91 km^{2} (1.51 sq mi)
- Elevation: 206 m (676 ft)
- Highest elevation: 221 m (725 ft)
- Lowest elevation: 140 m (460 ft)
- Population (2023): 19
  - Density: 4.9/km^{2} (13/sq mi)
- Time zone: UTC+01:00 (CET)
  - Summer (DST): UTC+02:00 (CEST)
- INSEE/Postal code: 55033 /55270
- ^{1} French Land Register data, which excludes lakes, ponds, glaciers > 1 km^{2} (0.386 sq mi or 247 acres) and river estuaries.

Baulny (French pronunciation: [bo(l)ni]) is a commune in the Meuse department in the Grand Est region in northeastern France.

== Population ==
Historical population
Year	Pop.	±% p.a.
1968	30	—
1975	30	+0.00%
1982	27	−1.49%
1990	29	+0.90%
1999	22	−3.02%
2007	14	−5.49%
2012	16	+2.71%
2017	16	+0.00%
2023	19	+2.91%
Source: INSEE

== See also ==
- Communes of the Meuse department
