= Malancourt =

- Commune
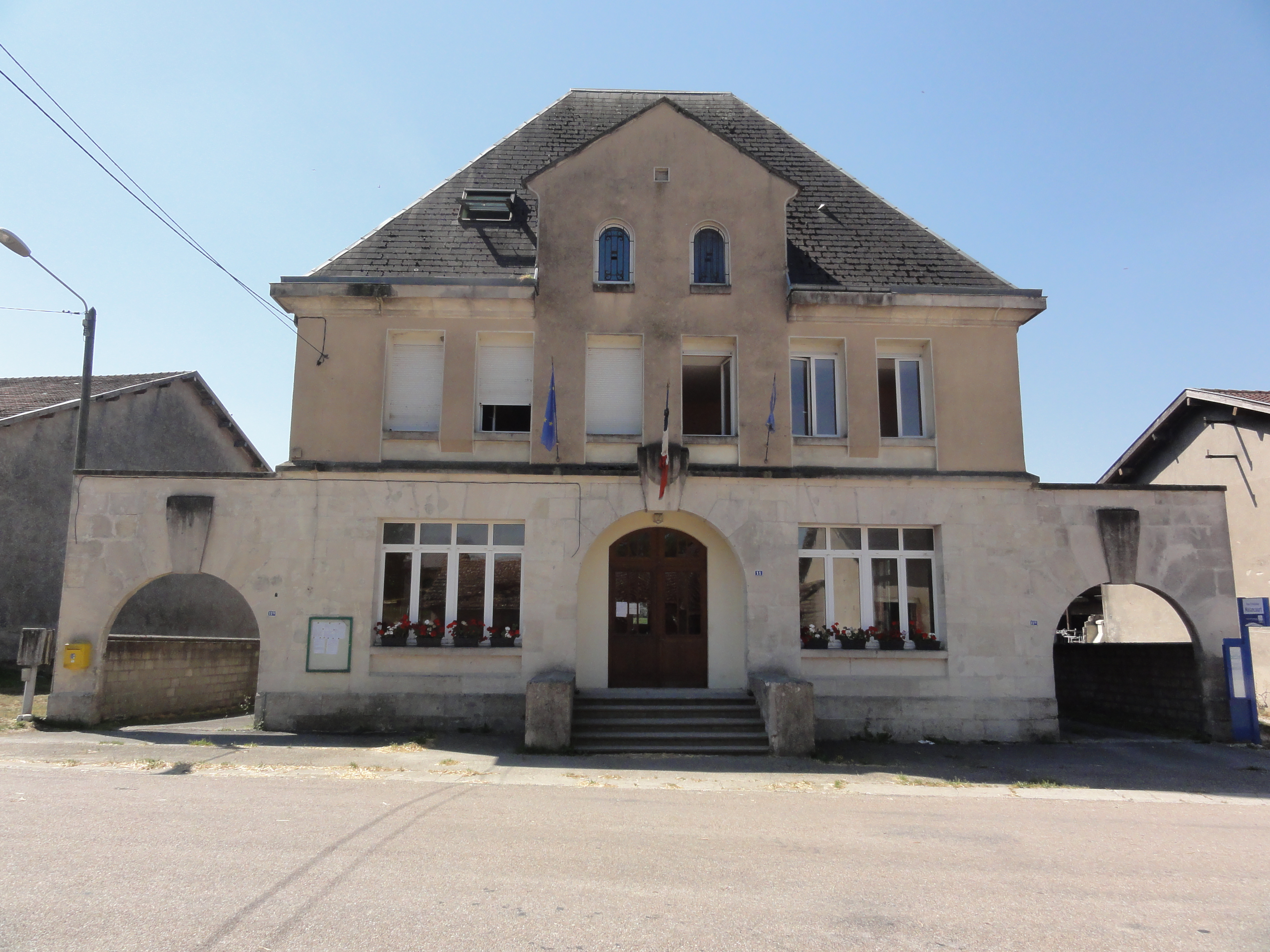
- The town hall in Malancourt

- Coat of arms
- Location of Malancourt
- Location within France Location within Grand Est
- Coordinates: 49°14′33″N 5°10′50″E
- Country: France
- Region: Grand Est
- Department: Meuse
- Arrondissement: Verdun
- Canton: Clermont-en-Argonne

Government
  - Mayor (2020–2026): Régis Degoutin
- Area^{1}: 16.52 km^{2} (6.38 sq mi)
- Elevation: 231 m (758 ft)
- Highest elevation: 297 m (974 ft)
- Lowest elevation: 209 m (686 ft)
- Population (2023): 65
  - Density: 3.9/km^{2} (10/sq mi)
- Time zone: UTC+01:00 (CET)
  - Summer (DST): UTC+02:00 (CEST)
- INSEE/Postal code: 55313 /55270
- ^{1} French Land Register data, which excludes lakes, ponds, glaciers > 1 km^{2} (0.386 sq mi or 247 acres) and river estuaries.

Malancourt (French pronunciation: [malɑ̃kuʁ]) is a commune in the Meuse department in Grand Est in north-eastern France.

== See also ==
- Communes of the Meuse department
