= Forges-sur-Meuse =

- Commune
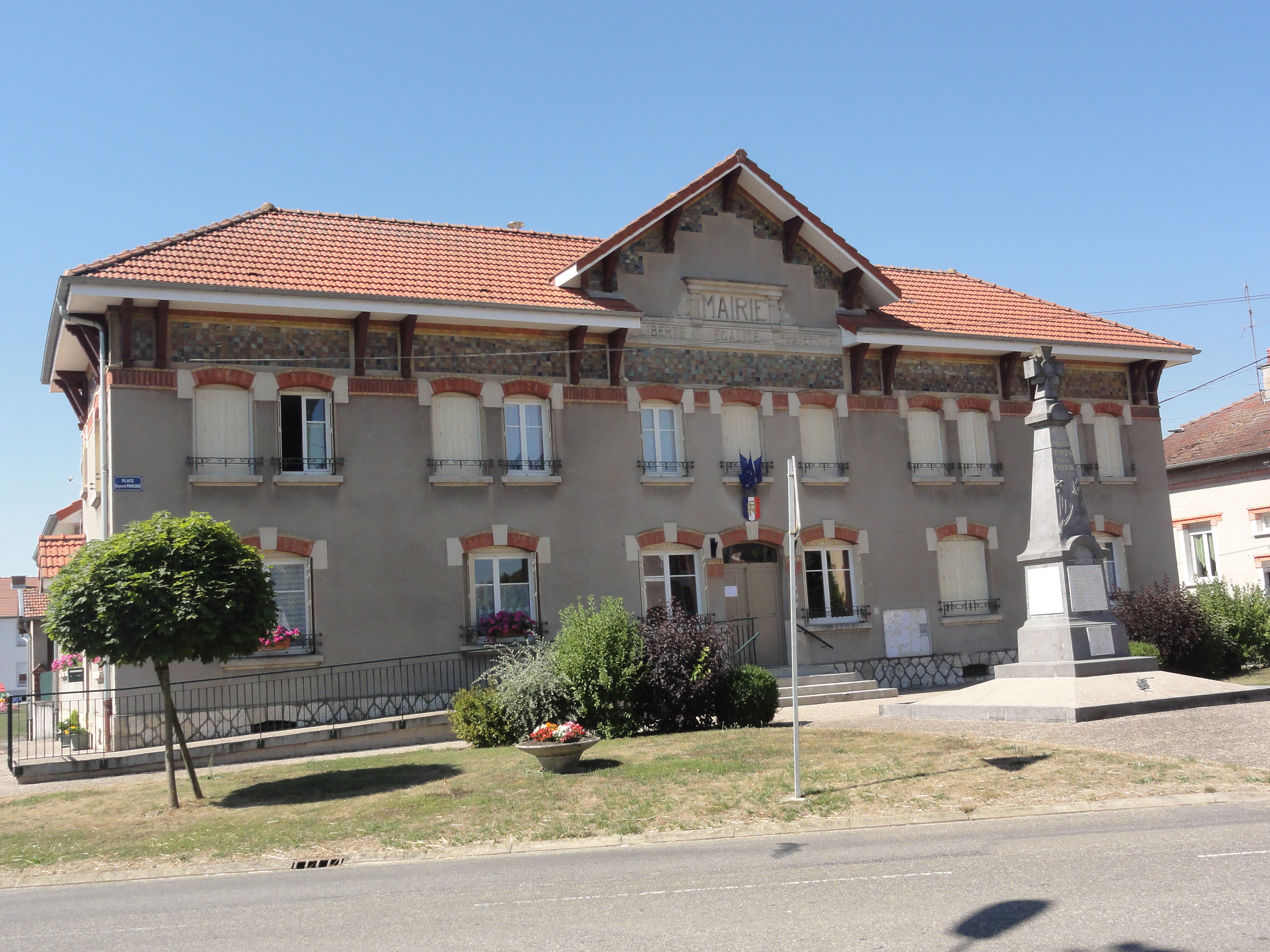
- The town hall in Forges-sur-Meuse

- Coat of arms
- Location of Forges-sur-Meuse
- Location within France Location within Grand Est
- Coordinates: 49°15′48″N 5°17′33″E
- Country: France
- Region: Grand Est
- Department: Meuse
- Arrondissement: Verdun
- Canton: Clermont-en-Argonne
- Intercommunality: Argonne-Meuse

Government
  - Mayor (2020–2026): Françoise Tessier
- Area^{1}: 15.97 km^{2} (6.17 sq mi)
- Elevation: 185 m (607 ft)
- Highest elevation: 287 m (942 ft)
- Lowest elevation: 180 m (590 ft)
- Population (2023): 121
  - Density: 7.58/km^{2} (19.6/sq mi)
- Time zone: UTC+01:00 (CET)
  - Summer (DST): UTC+02:00 (CEST)
- INSEE/Postal code: 55193 /55110
- ^{1} French Land Register data, which excludes lakes, ponds, glaciers > 1 km^{2} (0.386 sq mi or 247 acres) and river estuaries.

Forges-sur-Meuse (French pronunciation: [fɔʁʒ syʁ møz], literally Forges on Meuse) is a commune in the Meuse department in Grand Est in north-eastern France.

== See also ==
- Communes of the Meuse department
