= Récicourt =

- Commune
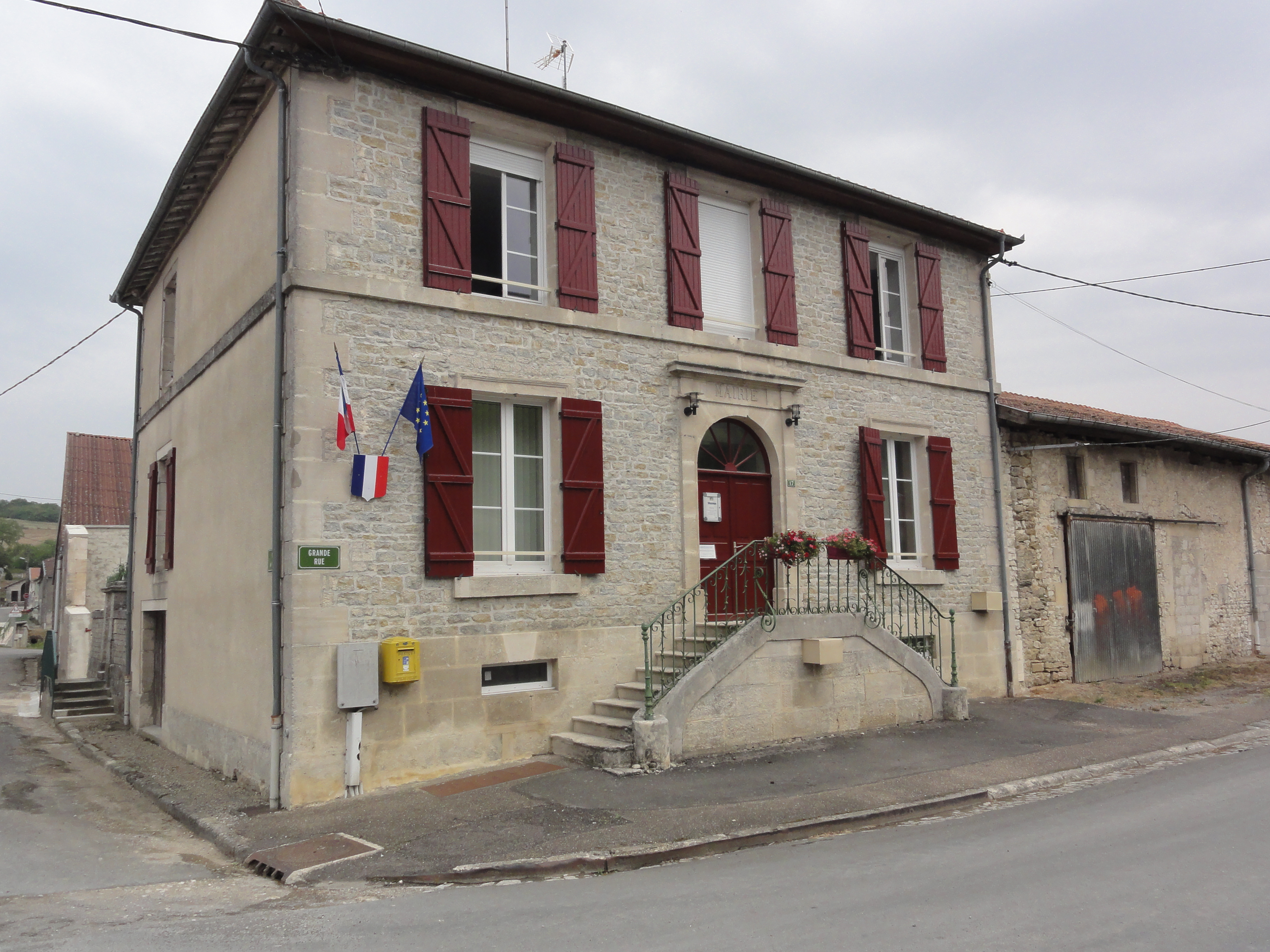
- The town hall in Récicourt
- Location of Récicourt
- Location within France Location within Grand Est
- Coordinates: 49°08′31″N 5°09′28″E
- Country: France
- Region: Grand Est
- Department: Meuse
- Arrondissement: Verdun
- Canton: Clermont-en-Argonne
- Intercommunality: CC Argonne-Meuse

Government
  - Mayor (2020–2026): Philippe Sendre
- Area^{1}: 28.2 km^{2} (10.9 sq mi)
- Elevation: 210 m (690 ft)
- Highest elevation: 303 m (994 ft)
- Lowest elevation: 193 m (633 ft)
- Population (2023): 149
  - Density: 5.28/km^{2} (13.7/sq mi)
- Time zone: UTC+01:00 (CET)
  - Summer (DST): UTC+02:00 (CEST)
- INSEE/Postal code: 55419 /55120
- ^{1} French Land Register data, which excludes lakes, ponds, glaciers > 1 km^{2} (0.386 sq mi or 247 acres) and river estuaries.

Récicourt (French pronunciation: [ʁesikuʁ]) is a commune in the Meuse department in Grand Est in north-eastern France.

== See also ==
- Communes of the Meuse department
