= Regnéville-sur-Meuse =

- Commune
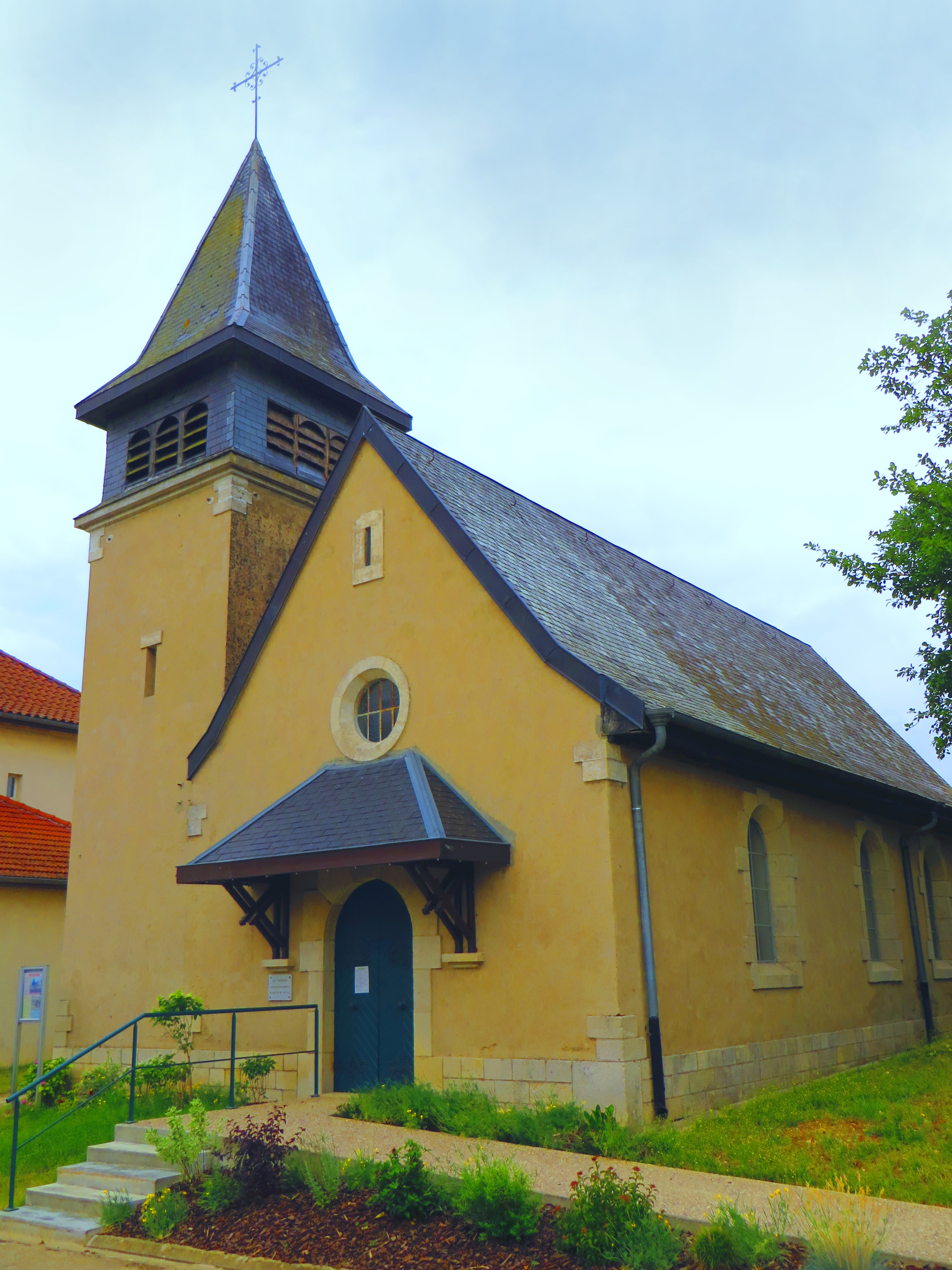
- The church in Regnéville-sur-Meuse

- Coat of arms
- Location of Regnéville-sur-Meuse
- Location within France Location within Grand Est
- Coordinates: 49°15′14″N 5°19′36″E
- Country: France
- Region: Grand Est
- Department: Meuse
- Arrondissement: Verdun
- Canton: Clermont-en-Argonne
- Intercommunality: Argonne-Meuse

Government
  - Mayor (2020–2026): André Trouslard
- Area^{1}: 3.81 km^{2} (1.47 sq mi)
- Elevation: 196 m (643 ft)
- Highest elevation: 255 m (837 ft)
- Lowest elevation: 180 m (590 ft)
- Population (2023): 50
  - Density: 13/km^{2} (34/sq mi)
- Time zone: UTC+01:00 (CET)
  - Summer (DST): UTC+02:00 (CEST)
- INSEE/Postal code: 55422 /55110
- ^{1} French Land Register data, which excludes lakes, ponds, glaciers > 1 km^{2} (0.386 sq mi or 247 acres) and river estuaries.

Regnéville-sur-Meuse (French pronunciation: [ʁəɲevil syʁ møz]) is a commune in the Meuse department in Grand Est in north-eastern France.

== See also ==
- Communes of the Meuse department
