= Cuisy, Meuse =

Cuisy
- Commune
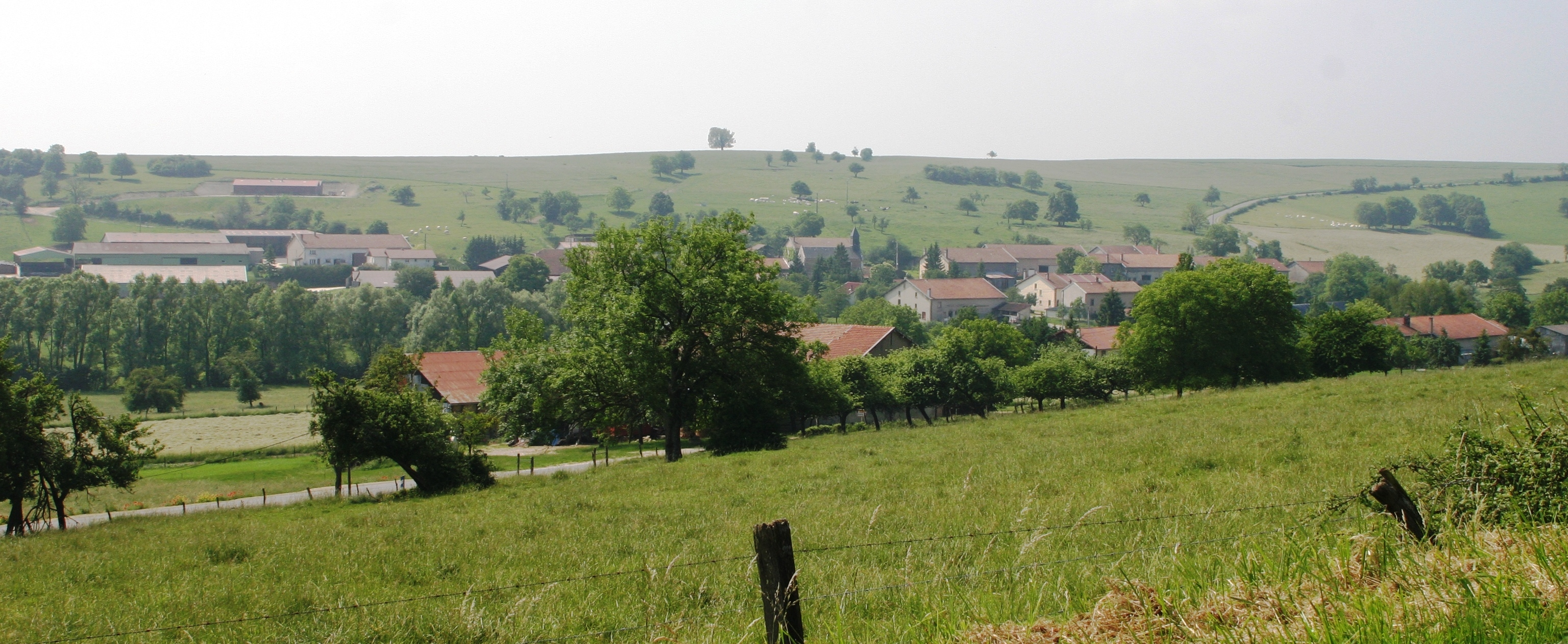
- A general view of Cuisy

- Coat of arms
- Location of Cuisy
- Location within France Location within Grand Est
- Coordinates: 49°16′07″N 5°10′45″E
- Country: France
- Region: Grand Est
- Department: Meuse
- Arrondissement: Verdun
- Canton: Clermont-en-Argonne
- Intercommunality: Argonne-Meuse

Government
  - Mayor (2020–2026): Marie-Anne Gobin
- Area^{1}: 5.56 km^{2} (2.15 sq mi)
- Highest elevation: 304 m (997 ft)
- Lowest elevation: 209 m (686 ft)
- Population (2023): 48
  - Density: 8.6/km^{2} (22/sq mi)
- Time zone: UTC+01:00 (CET)
  - Summer (DST): UTC+02:00 (CEST)
- INSEE/Postal code: 55137 /55270
- ^{1} French Land Register data, which excludes lakes, ponds, glaciers > 1 km^{2} (0.386 sq mi or 247 acres) and river estuaries.

Cuisy (French pronunciation: [kɥizi]) is a commune in the Meuse department in Grand Est in north-eastern France.

== Population ==
Historical population
Year	Pop.	±% p.a.
1968	49	—
1975	55	+1.66%
1982	51	−1.07%
1990	53	+0.48%
1999	46	−1.56%
2007	44	−0.55%
2012	52	+3.40%
2017	46	−2.42%
2023	48	+0.71%
Source: INSEE

== See also ==
- Communes of the Meuse department
