= Siege of Nijmegen (1794) =

Siege of the War of the First Coalition

- Part of the Flanders campaign of the War of the First Coalition
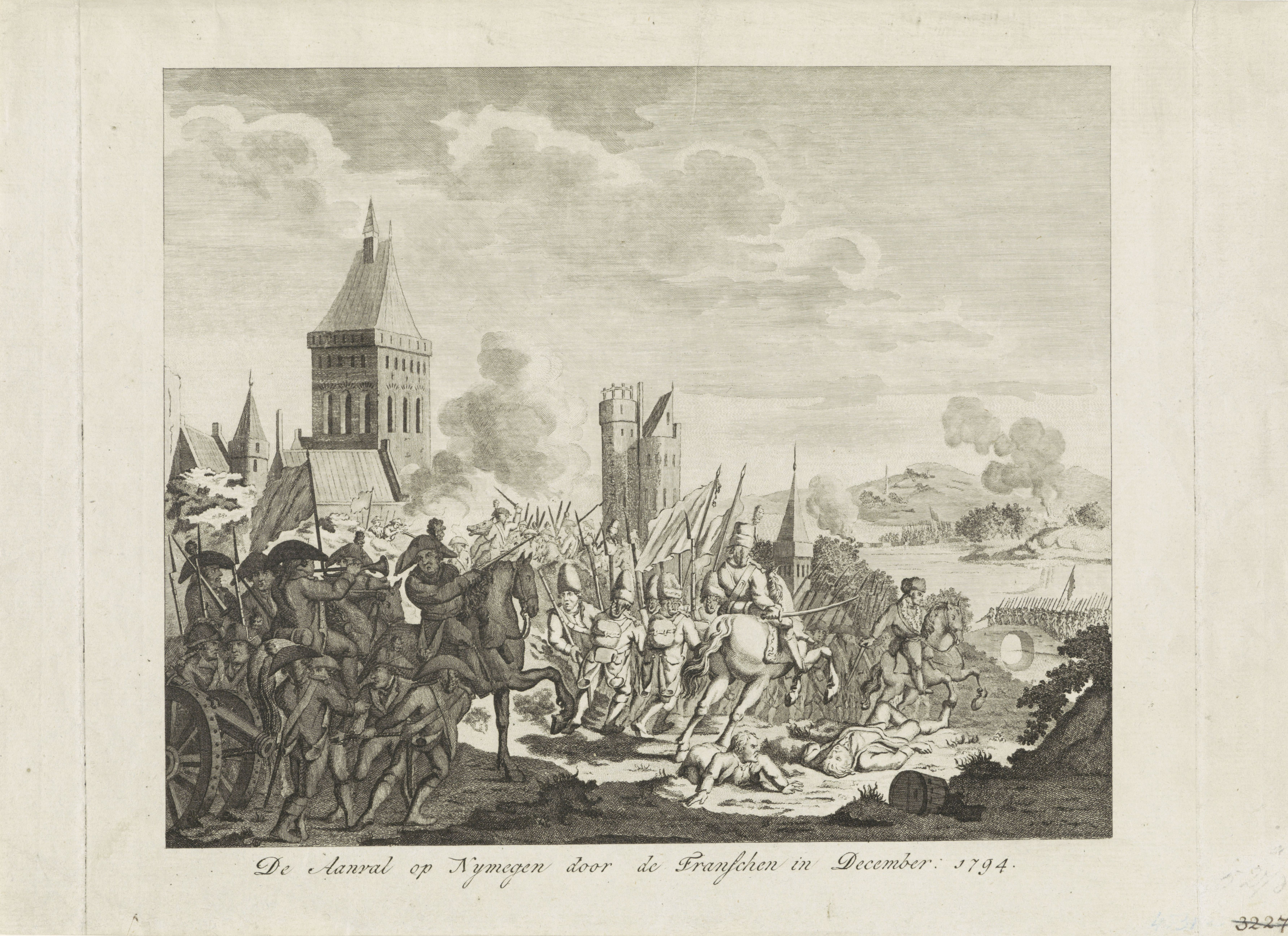
- The Attack on Nymegen by the French. Print attributed to Nicolaas Sonnenberg, 1794.
Date	27 October – 8 November 1794
Location	Nijmegen, Guelders, Dutch Republic
Result	French victory

Belligerents
French Republic	Dutch Republic (Kingdom of Great Britain) Great Britain (Electorate of Brunswick-Lüneburg) Hanover; Hesse-Kassel

Commanders and leaders
Jean Moreau; Herman Daendels; Jan Willem de Winter	William V of Orange; Frederick of Orange; Duke of York; Count of Wallmoden

Strength
20,000 soldiers (19 October)	8,000 soldiers (24 October); 50 to 60 cannon (21 October)

The siege of Nijmegen occurred from 27 October to 8 November 1794 during the Flanders campaign of the War of the First Coalition. It was the last major military confrontation between the forces of the Revolutionary French First Republic and the reactionary First Coalition of European monarchs including William V, Prince of Orange, before the fall of the Dutch Republic in January 1795, which William had ruled as hereditary stadtholder since 1751. As commander-in-chief of the Dutch States Army, his indecision, several changes of mind and lack of coordination with his Anglo-Hanoverian, Hessian, Prussian and Austrian allies contributed to the eventual surrender of Nijmegen to the French revolutionaries.

== Background ==
During the Patriottentijd, William V, Prince of Orange had taken refuge in Nijmegen when he was deprived of the command of the garrison of the Hague in 1785. After his wife Wilhelmina of Prussia, Princess of Orange was arrested by Patriots at Goejanverwellesluis on 28 June 1787, the Prussian Army invaded Holland and expelled the Patriots, who fled to France or disguised themselves as 'reading clubs'. William V left Nijmegen again and resumed his residence in the Hague, while reinforcing his powers through the Act of Guarantee. He formed new alliances with Prussia and Great Britain, which led the Dutch Republic to assume a subordinate role to the two powers.

In the summer of 1794, the momentum changed when the French Revolutionary Army won several major victories against the First Coalition in the Flanders campaign, to which William V's son Frederick, the hereditary Prince of Orange, had contributed a Dutch States Army contingent. The Prussian and Austrian armies withdrew to the Rhineland, while British, Hanoverian, Hessian and Dutch troops withdrew further northwards to defend the Dutch Republic.

== Course ==
=== Advance on Nijmegen ===
The Nijmegian contemporary citizen Jan van Hulst recorded a detailed account of the siege in his personal diary. On 3 October, Dutch troops constructed a pontoon bridge across the river Waal near Nijmegen for easier troop movement. Those days, companies from several countries came and went from the city, and the stadtholder and his sons showed up several times inside its walls. The French came closer by the day, and there were multiple minor field battles and skirmishes near the outposts to the south of Nijmegen, while the city and the surrounding forts were being reinforced. The French Army of the North, led by general Jean-Charles Pichegru and assisted by the Batavian Legion under the brigade generals Herman Willem Daendels and Jan Willem de Winter, forced the Dutch army to surrender 's-Hertogenbosch on 12 October after a siege of three weeks.

Pichegru fell ill soon after, and retreated to Brussels to recover. His replacement, Jean Victor Marie Moreau, crossed the river Maas at Teeffelen with a division on 18 or 19 October, followed by another division under Joseph Souham's command. There were battles near Puiflijk, Appeltern, Dreumel, Batenburg and Winssen between the French troops, alleged to be 20,000 men strong, versus two British regiments and a French Royalists army of 1,200 men under the Prince of Rohan. In the battles, the British 37th Regiment of Foot's standard was captured, and the Allies suffered heavy casualties, with 19 captured Royalists being executed. The Land van Maas en Waal was soon entirely in French hands. That night, Allied troops looted Neerbosch and Hees. The same day, Cleves was conquered by the French. On 20 October, there were skirmishes on the heath near Wijchen and the flower mountains near Zyfflich, while the French bombarded Tiel and severed the connection between Grave and Nijmegen. Grave was completely surrounded by the French, but not assaulted yet, because they wanted to conquer Nijmegen first. As a fortress city, Grave was much harder to capture. It endured until 30 December when heavy French bombardments had reduced most of it to rubble.

=== Battles between outposts ===
In the morning of 21 October, the Hanoverian general Wallmoden asked the magistrate of Nijmegen whether there were enough food supplies to make it through a siege; from the doubtful answer he received, he concluded that the city had to be evacuated. Meanwhile, the French had reached Neerbosch, while the British had abandoned their outposts. From the Hague, the stadtholder ordered to not defend Nijmegen against the French, and so the evacuation of the city was commenced. On 22 October, there was heavy fighting between outposts between 2 and 6 o'clock, causing at least 80 Allied casualties. The French approached the city to within 15 minutes, but then retreated again. There were skirmishes at 7 o'clock in the morning and also in the afternoon of 23 October. The French army's main force was stationed in Wijchen, while inside Nijmegen the Allies continued to station more troops, for example in the Romanesque churches. On 24 and 25 October, the city was geared into a state of emergency, while food shortages began to grow and Allied soldiers started plundering the countryside. A French attack near Hees was beaten back. The pontoon bridge across the Waal was filled with combustibles so it could be burned after crossing, preventing the French from using it. The French vainly tried to shoot the floating bridge to pieces before the Allies could use it for a retreat. On 26 October, there was combat near the Pelmolen with an unknown number of casualties. The Emigrants of Dumas left the city in the direction of Zutphen.

=== Start of the siege ===
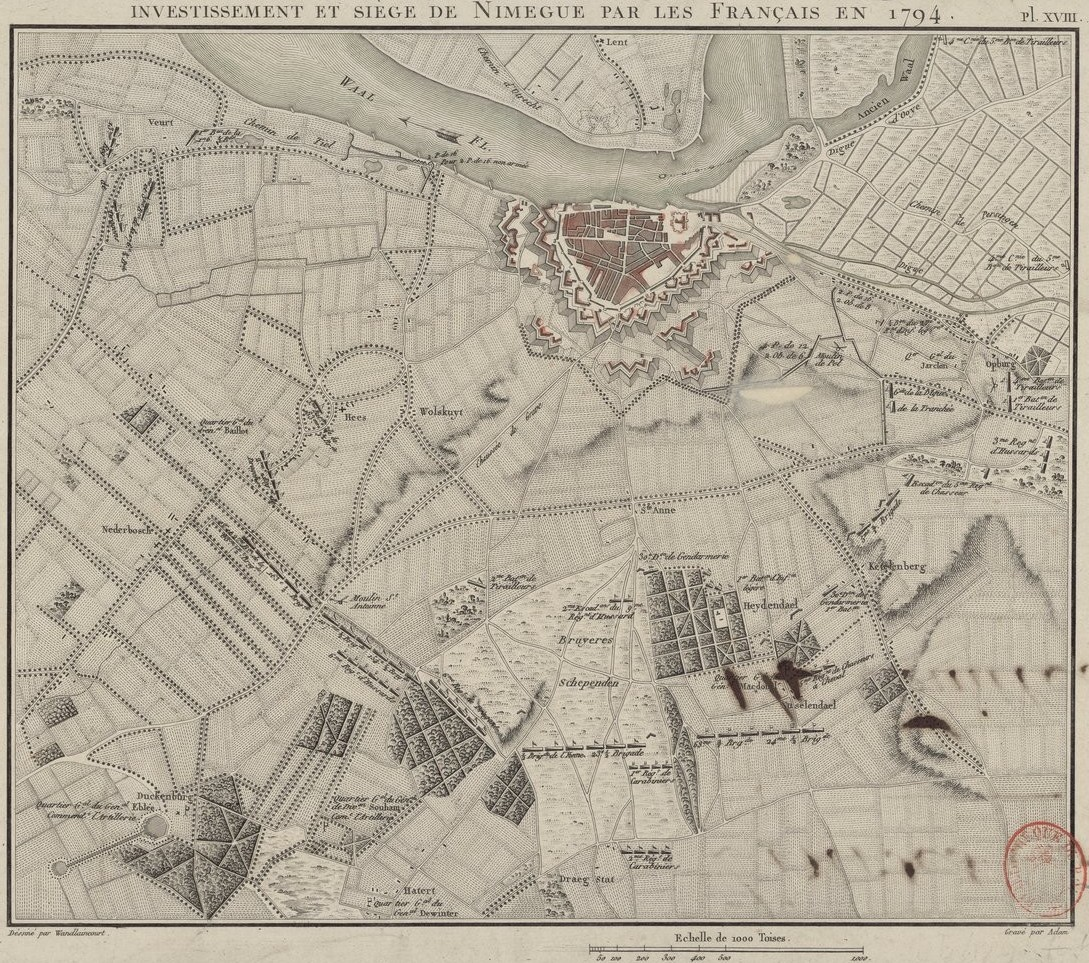
Map of Nijmegen during the siege.

The cannon on the Nijmegian walls fired for the first time on 27 October at 12.30 pm, and the French army directly shot back at them as well. As a precaution, several houses in Hees were burnt down at 6 pm, in order to prevent the French from garrisoning them. In Ooij, the French installed artillery batteries; Allied bombardments from the Bemmelsedijk tried in vain to prevent this. By this time, it was alleged that all Allied outposts had been evacuated or captured by the French, who took many prisoners of war. The Prince of Orange changed his mind about his earlier decision on 28 October, and announced that he loved Nijmegen too much to just surrender her to the enemy. Hulst, who showed some pro-French sympathies in his account, called the stadtholder's decision to risk the city to withstand a siege 'nonsensical' because of a lack of supplies, and he claimed that the citizenry would rather capitulate quickly. General Wallmoden would also once again have given the order to evacuate the city, and have left it himself. The well-covered French batteries in Ooij were hard to hit, but they themselves were highly efficient in firing on the eastern walls. The other sides of the city remained quiet. Meanwhile, the shortages in combustibles and flour were increasing, and Allied soldiers began to aggressively demand food and drink from civilians.

From 29 October to 1 November, the French did not attack, but carefully prepared for a long-term siege by constructing more trenches and batteries in the ever colder weather. Although the defenders bombarded them with cannons, they had little effect. Several more homes in Hees were shot ablaze from the walls. A number of high-ranking Allied commanders appeared in the city and convened to discuss what to do. It was suggested to make a sortie out of the city in an attempt to frustrate the French preparations. In the end, only a single sortie involving 300 British and 200 Hanoverian soldiers was performed towards a French battery located on the Hunnerberg, but it was beaten back with a loss of 100 men. In the meantime, the wood shortage inside Nijmegen was rapidly becoming serious, and all kinds of things were set on fire to produce warmth. On 2 November, Allied forces employed an almost endless barrage on the slowly nearer-digging French troops, who did not return the fire. That evening and night, 3000 men with military wagons and horses are said to have crossed the river while evacuating the city. At night, Hanoverian troops made another sortie and reached the French trenches, but it appeared that they did not achieve more than capturing a few spades whilst incurring 60 deaths and 40 injuries. The next day, the evacuation was resumed. Numerous bombs, cannon and howitzers balls were thrown into the river so that they wouldn't fall into French hands. Moreover, 500 tonnes of flour were dumped overboard, but hungry civilians retrieved much of it from the water for their own use. The situation turned around when the three Princes of Orange came from Arnhem and arrived in Nijmegen in the afternoon to consult with the other military commanders. The result appears to have been to cease the evacuation and to resume the siege, because room was made for 3,600 fresh British and Dutch troops (including two Dutch artillery companies), who arrived later that night. Allied troops on the walls kept firing at the French, who kept digging closer without firing back.

The artillery on the walls was reinforced on 4 November, and much of the ammunition dumped in the Waal was brought back to the surface to be used. The far-progressed trenches were assailed during a large-scale British sortie, and the first and second line were successfully taken, with many tools and French soldiers captured. At the third line, however, they met with fierce French counter-fire of cannons and muskets, suffering heavy losses and withdrawing back to the city in great disorder. British troops also attempted to climb the Hunnerberg but were repulsed by French chasseurs before being relieved by a Hanoverian battalion that escorted them back into the city. 5 November was another relatively quiet day; even more Allied troops and artillery pieces were stationed in Nijmegen and there was a little less fierce firing than the day before, while the French resumed digging efforts and had deployed extra guards near the trenches in case of another sortie. The Duke of York, commander of the British troops, planned a counter-offensive with Austrian assistance to relieve Nijmegen, but this was cancelled when the Hanoverian contingent refused to participate. British troops began to leave the city on the order of York, who was recalled to England and replaced by William Harcourt.

=== The French bombardment ===
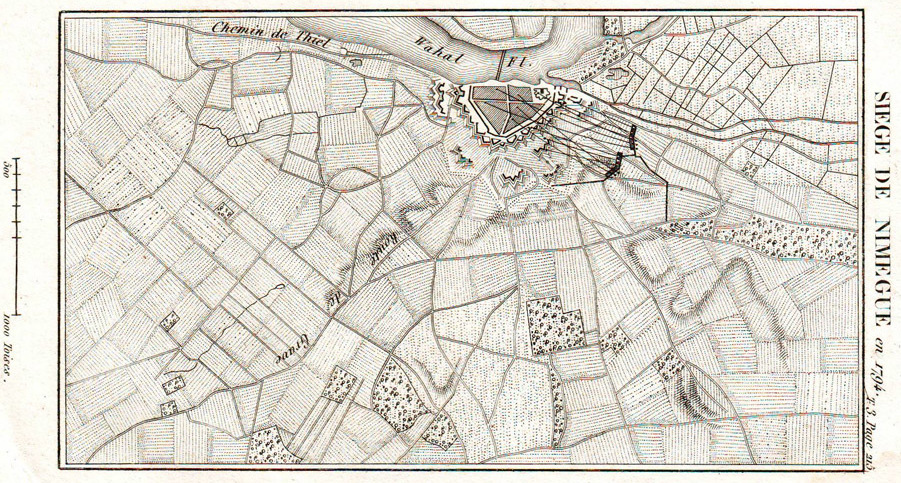
Map of the French trenches and batteries on the Hunnerberg and their firing directions

In the morning of 6 November, the stadtholder once again assured the population that he would defend the city, and even promised to relieve her within three days as soon as the necessary reinforcements had arrived. That afternoon, the French field works were completed, and they commenced heavy howitzer bombardments around 7 or 8 pm. The impacts caused major panic inside the city; most civilians fled to their cellars for cover. Dutch troops launched desperate sorties, but these ended in failure, with the attackers suffering more casualties than the French. The pontoon bridge was damaged, but carpenters restored it in the midst of the shooting. At night, several British infantry battalions, most of the British and Hanoverian cavalry and some artillery units abandoned the city. A number of British soldiers broke ranks and began looting local houses, though due to the quick response of Dutch troops only two or three houses were looted. In parts of the city, citizens armed with pitchforks assaulted British soldiers suspected of looting, detaining 50. Up to 20 British soldiers were executed by the Dutch and buried where they died to cover up any evidence of the killings.

The Emigrants of Damas left Nijmegen on 7 November at 9 am. The howitzer bombardments, which were less frequent at night, resumed the next day in all ferocity. Dutch troops, assisted by a local sheriff, continued to act against British soldiers accused of looting. Between 1 and 3 o'clock, a fire raged in the Hertogsteeg that was hard to extinguish; water was difficult to obtain, and people rather avoided the streets. At 4 pm, the Dominicus Church caught fire, and the flames, fed by the wind, spread to the surrounding houses. It was not until after the steeple had collapsed that the fire would be extinguished around 11 pm. However, a new fire in the Hertogsteeg could not be tamed, and several homes completely turned into ashes. The City Council held a meeting at 7 o'clock, but most regenten had already fled the city by then.

After midnight, the remaining British, Hanoverian and Hessian troops in Nijmegen evacuated the city. While the retreating troops crossed the pontoon bridge towards Lent, it came under heavy fire from French howitzers. As soon as the last troops had crossed the bridge around 1 or 2 am, Allied soldiers set it on fire to prevent the French from using it, which also prevented the remaining Dutch units in the city from withdrawing. Seeing the burning bridge, and noticing the defenders decreasingly returned their fire, the French concluded that the city had almost been evacuated. Several hundreds of troops were sent on reconnaissance to inspect the occupation of the walls. They scaled the walls, entered the city without resistance and opened up three gates (the Hesepoort, Molenpoort and Hertogsteegsepoort), after which the main force was informed. Around 4 am, French troops spread throughout the city to occupy strategic points. From the other side, captain Reine (a Dutch Patriot) advanced to the Hunnerpoort to demand access in the name of the French Republic. This was granted by the magistrate, and the French took over the gatehouse. The remaining Dutch troops who could not flee the city because of the burning pontoon bridge were taken prisoner. The prisoners of war were disarmed on the very same day, and escorted to Ravenstein with full military honours and beating drum. Eventually, the capitulation was written up by the Dutch officer Sanders van Wel in the Molenstraat, which was soon signed by general Souham. Thus, Nijmegen fell into French hands on 8 November.

Hulst reported that the French troops were very disciplined, and did not engage in looting but walked across the streets gleefully and singing while greeting civilians. Tensions loomed when unsuspecting shop owners started trading Dutch guilders 1 on 1 against the heavily devalued French assignats, prompting the military leadership to temporarily close down all shops to protect the vendors against economic damage. British troops continued to occupy the Knodsenburg fortress on the other side of the Waal and fired on the city for some time, to little effect, but successfully keeping the French at a distance for the time being.

== Aftermath ==
With the conquest of Nijmegen, the French Republic had reached the Rhine and the Waal rivers, which were often claimed to be the 'natural boundary' of France, which the French had tried to seize earlier during the Flanders campaign. Daendels, however, pressed the French high command to occupy the rest of the Dutch Republic, where the Patriots were increasingly stirring up revolts and demanded the departure of the Orangists. Eventually, the French food shortages were the decisive factor to continue the advance. On 10 January 1795, Pichegru crossed the frozen Waal, after which only little fighting was needed in the rest of the country: on 16 January, the province of Utrecht surrendered, and on the night of 18 to 19 January the nonviolent Batavian Revolution in Amsterdam resulted in the proclamation of the Batavian Republic, while many Orangists together with the stadtholder fled to England. In other cities similar revolutions took place in which the Patriots took over municipal administrations.

During the spring of 1795, the French government and the Batavian Republic negotiated which regions would be annexed by France: French negotiators pushed for the Waal as the border between the two republics, but their Batavian counterparts found this too high a price for the population which had largely liberated itself, and wanted to retain friendly ties with the French. The resulting Treaty of The Hague, signed on 16 May 1795, stipulated that only the Generality Lands of Staats-Vlaanderen, Staats-Overmaas and Staats-Opper-Gelre would become French territory, while Staats-Brabant and the parts of Duchy of Guelders and the County of Holland below the river Waal would remain in Batavian control. Nijmegen thus became part of the new Batavian Republic, but the division of Guelders caused the city to be reassigned to the Department of the Dommel and to lose its status as capital to 's-Hertogenbosch.
