= Maasbommel =

- Small city
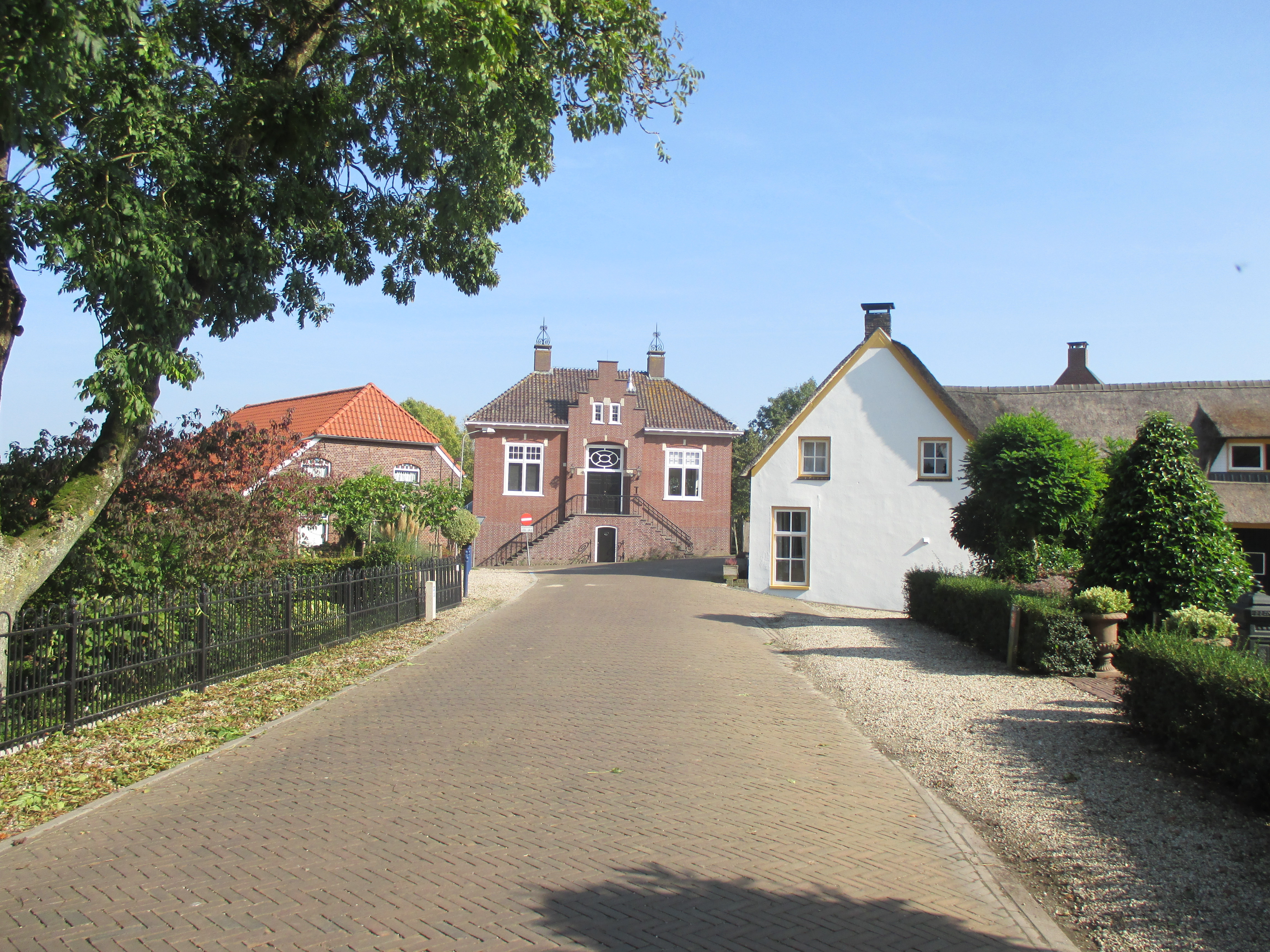

- Coat of arms

- Location in the Netherlands Maasbommel (Netherlands)
- Coordinates: 51°49′15″N 5°32′11″E
- Country: Netherlands
- Province: Gelderland
- Municipality: West Maas en Waal

Area
  - Total: 10.68 km^{2} (4.12 sq mi)
- Elevation: 7 m (23 ft)

Population (2021)
  - Total: 1,345
  - Density: 125.9/km^{2} (326.2/sq mi)
- Time zone: UTC+1 (CET)
  - Summer (DST): UTC+2 (CEST)
- Postal code: 6627
- Dialing code: 0487

Maasbommel is a city in the Dutch province of Gelderland. It is a part of the municipality of West Maas en Waal, and lies about 7 km north of Oss. It received city rights in 1312.

Maasbommel was a separate municipality until 1818, when it was merged with Appeltern.

== History ==
It was first mentioned in 1144 as de Bumele, and probably means "forest of trees near the Maas" as to distinguish from Zaltbommel. Maasbommel was established along the river. In 1312, Maasbommel received city rights and joined the Hanseatic League. Even though it was granted city rights, it did not develop after the Middle Ages. In the 13th century, a church built which was demolished in 1812. In 1672, French troops severely damaged the city and destroyed the Hof bij Maasbommel.

In 1818, Maasbommel was no longer an independent municipality and was merged into Appeltern. In 1840, it was home to 703 people. The Dutch Reformed Church dates from 1842, and the Catholic Church was built between 1868 and 1869.

Maasbommel is known as the place where pioneering floating amphibious houses have been built.

== Gallery ==
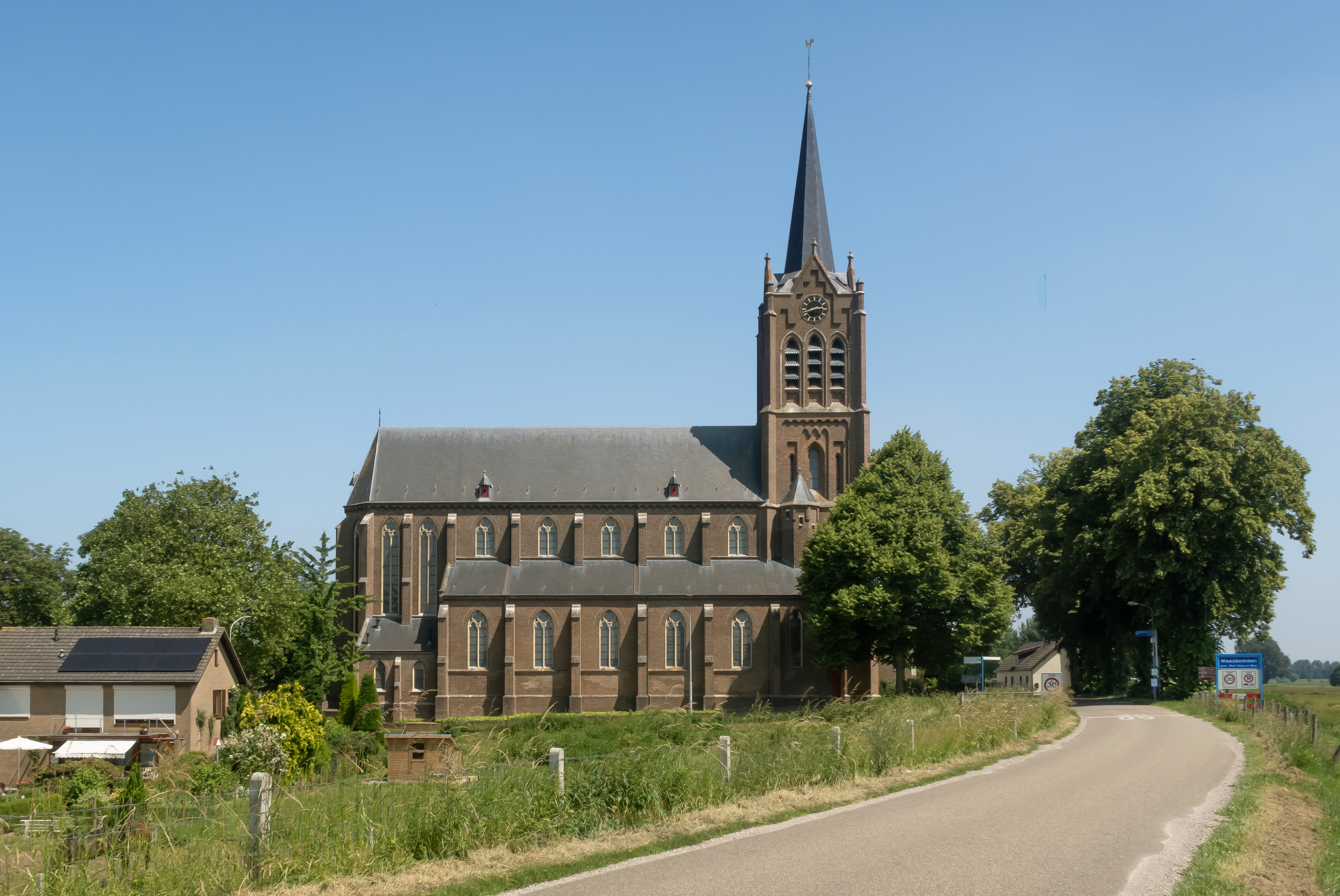
Church: the Sint-Lambertuskerk

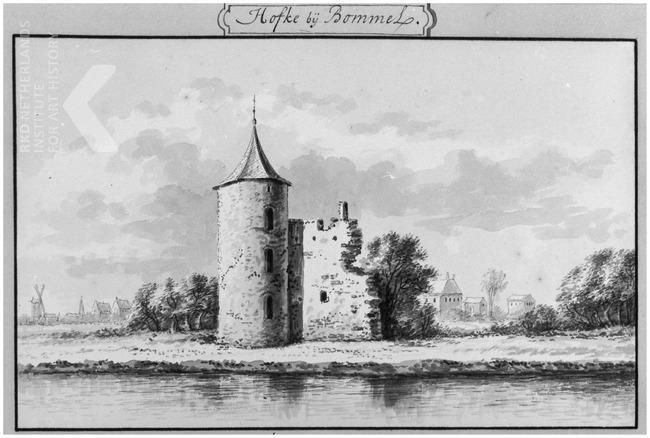
Ruins of the Hof bij Maasbommel (1718–1730)

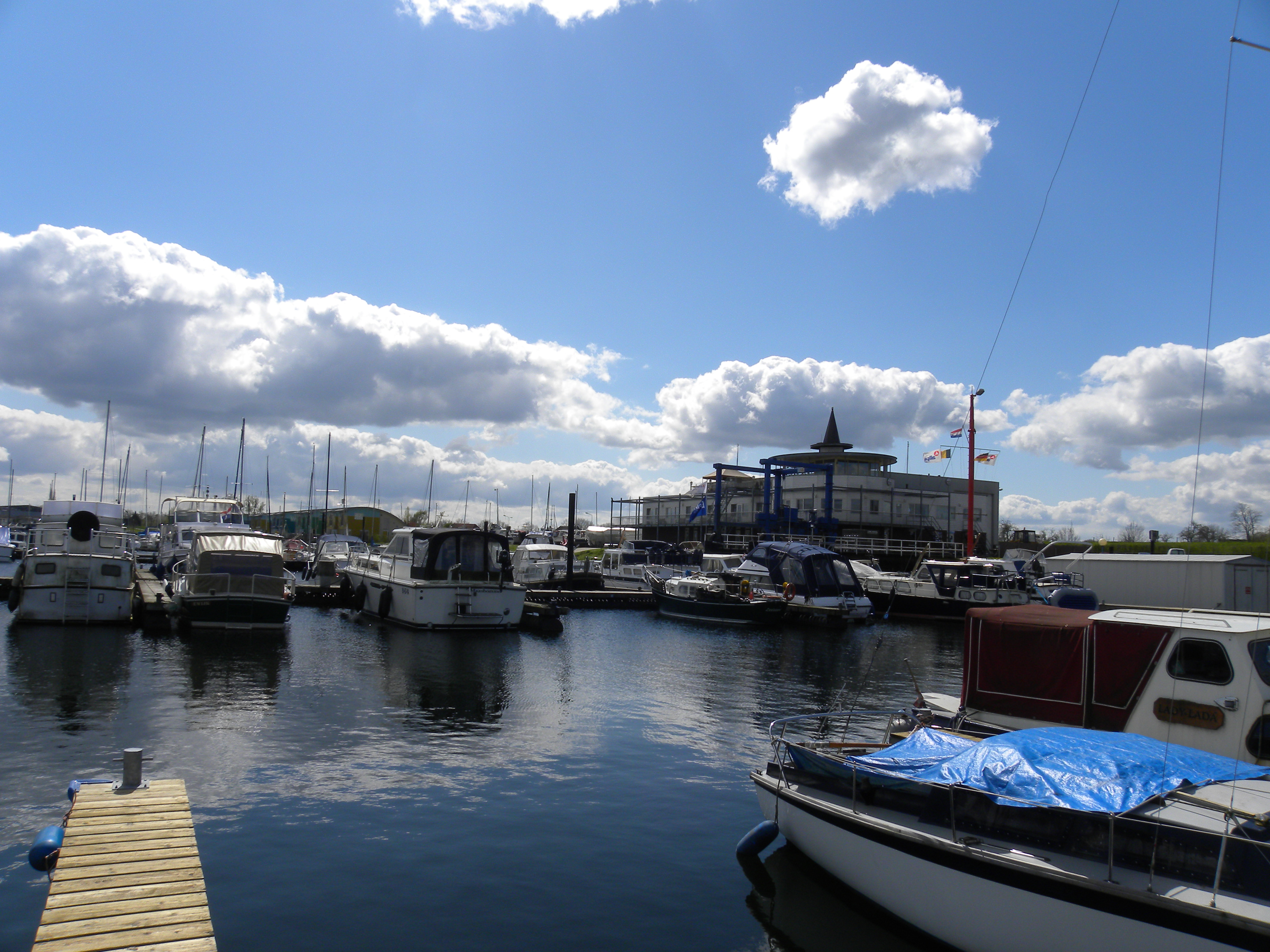
Harbour of Maasbommel

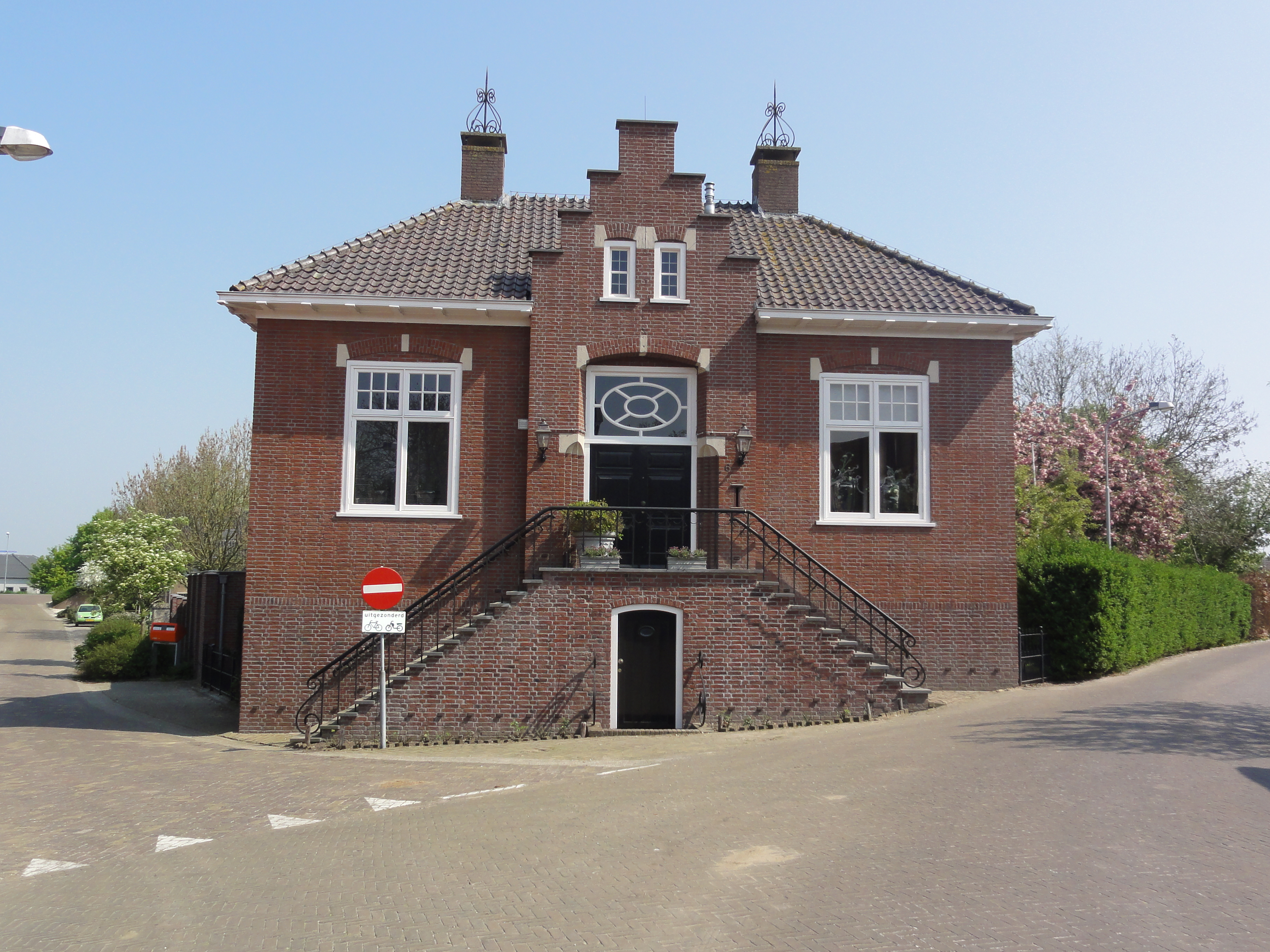
Former city hall
