= Battle of Puiflijk =

Battle of the War of the First Coalition

- Part of the War of the First Coalition; Flanders campaign
Date	19 October 1794
Location	Puiflijk, Guelders, Dutch Republic
Result	French victory

Belligerents
French Republic	(Kingdom of Great Britain) Great Britain; Armée des émigrés

Commanders and leaders
Jean-Charles Pichegru	Duke of York; Prince of Rohan

The Battle of Puiflijk occurred on 19 October 1794 in the Land van Maas en Waal region of the Netherlands during the Flanders campaign of the War of the First Coalition against Revolutionary France.

The battle took place in three different locations between French troops under the command of general Jean-Charles Pichegru and Coalition forces. The latter, the Allies, consisted of troops from Great Britain and a French Armée des émigrés force under the Prince of Rohan. They were led by the British commander-in-chief, Prince Frederick, Duke of York and Albany.

The Allies had fortified themselves in outposts behind the Oude Wetering canal and the dykes of the Maas and Waal rivers. On 18 October 1794, the French crossed the Maas from Teeffelen (near Lithoijen) to Alphen. On 19 October, they attacked the Coalition outposts in three locations: near Appeltern (Blauwe Sluis), Altforst and the Waal dyke near Druten (Puiflijk).

At Blauwe Sluis, Rohan's forces were pushed back after heavy fighting. In this action, 19 'émigrés' were captured. They were brought before a French military court in Ravenstein on 21 October 1794, where they were condemned to death and executed for treason. The British forces were driven back in great disorder; in the action on the Waal dyke, the standard of the British 37th Regiment of Foot was captured by the sans-culottes.

== Re-enactment ==
On 10 August 2017, the Battle of Puiflijk was re-enacted on a small scale by a team of actors with the help of the citizens of Puiflijk. It was part of a broader event of Omroep Gelderland's television programme Zomer in Gelderland to put the village on the map.

== Sources ==
- F.H.A. Sabron: De oorlog van 1794-1795 op het grondgebied van de Republiek der Zeven Verenigde Nederlanden (Breda 1892).
- René Bittard des Portes: Les Emigrés A Cocarde Noire en Angleterre, dans les provinces Belges, en Hollande et a Quiberon (Paris 1908).
- Drs. G-J.A.N. Derksen: De slag bij Puiflijk: Oorlog en politiek overschreden een drempel in het land van Maas en Waal (Soest 2015). Boekscout ISBN 978-94-022-1644-8.
