= Moordhuizen =

- Hamlet
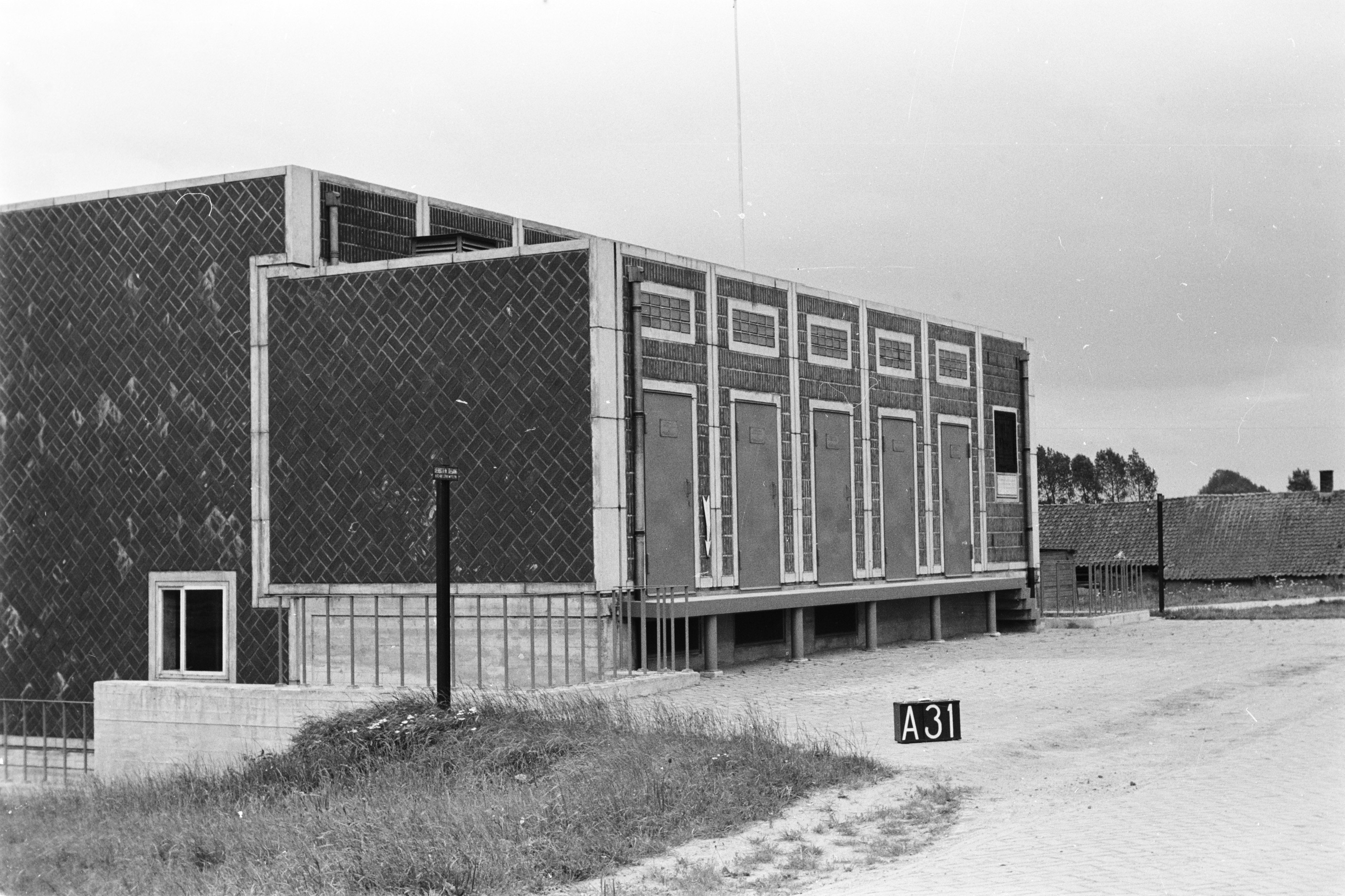
- Quarles van Ufford pumping station in Moordhuizen

- Location in the Netherlands Moordhuizen (Netherlands)
- Coordinates: 51.8146°N 5.4412°E
- Country: Netherlands
- Province: Gelderland
- Municipality: West Maas en Waal
- Elevation: 7 m (23 ft)
- Time zone: UTC+1 (CET)
  - Summer (DST): UTC+2 (CEST)
- Postal code: 6627
- Dialing code: 0487

Moordhuizen is a hamlet in the Dutch province of Gelderland. It is a part of the municipality of West Maas en Waal and is located about 3 kilometres (1.9 mi) from Alphen. The hamlet is notable for its name, and is the location of the Quarles van Ufford pumping station.

== Etymology ==
Moordhuizen translates to Murder Houses. The hamlet was first mentioned in 1791 as Morthuisen. According to professional etymologists, it means "murder houses", however the local historical society considers the name a corruption of Moethuysen meaning "houses on muddy land".

== Overview ==
Moordhuizen is not a statistical entity, and the postal authorities have placed it under Alphen. It does not have place name signs unlike the neighbouring hamlet Blauwesluis.

In 1576, soldiers of the Spanish Empire pillaged and plundered the area. On the night of 25 to 26 April, the citizens of Alphen counterattacked and killed twelve soldiers at Moordhuizen. Stadtholder Gillis van Barlaymond wanted to punish the citizens of Alphen, however father Wilhelmus de Man made a plea for clemency. Whether the event is related to the name of the hamlet, is unknown.

At the census of 1930, Moordhuizen was home to 191 people. Nowadays, it consists of about 20 or 40 houses depending on the in- or exclusion of Sluisweg. The ferry across the Meuse is located in Moordhuizen, however it is officially called Lith–Alphen.

== Water management ==
The area around Moordhuizen plays an important role in the water management of the Meuse and Waal region. In the 17th century, six polder mills were built at Moordhuizen to drain excess water. In 1791–1792, two additional windmills were added. One of mills burned down, and was replaced by two more mills in 1818. The windmills had difficulties handling the amount of water, and in 1846, a pumping station based on a steam engine was installed. In the 1930s, the steam engine was unable to cope and the lands near Alphen were often flooded.

In October 1952, an electric pumping station was built at Moordhuizen, and named Quarles van Ufford pumping station after Cypriaan Gerard Carel Quarles van Ufford. Nowadays, the pumping station is able to move 1,173 cubic metres (41,400 cu ft) of water per minute. In January 1995, the village of Alphen aan de Maas was evacuated because of high water and a risk of a dike breach. In 1997, a monument was donated by their namesake Alphen aan de Rijn. In 2012, the monument was moved to the dike near the pumping station.

== Gallery ==
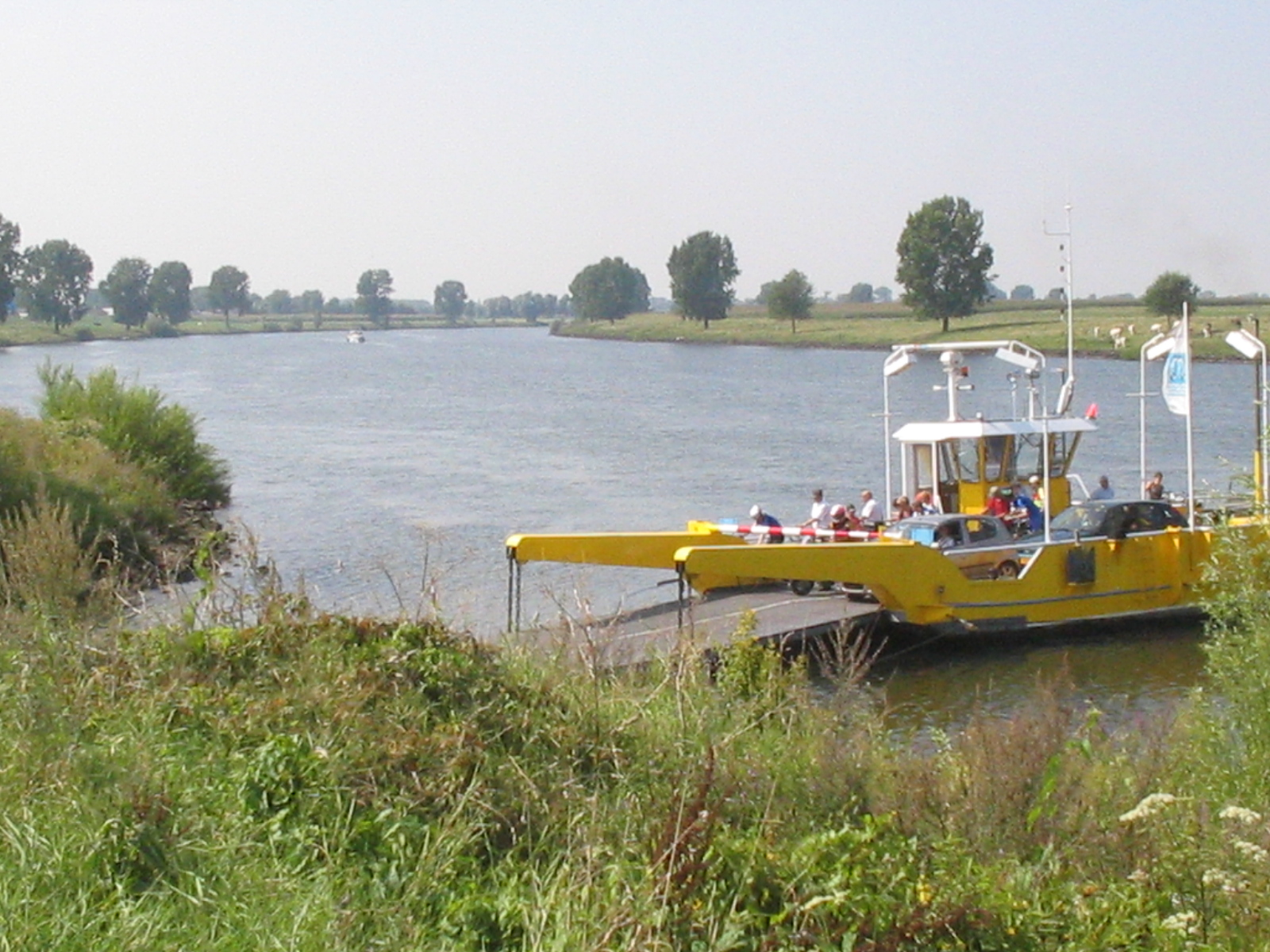
Ferry Lith–Alphen (Moordhuizen)

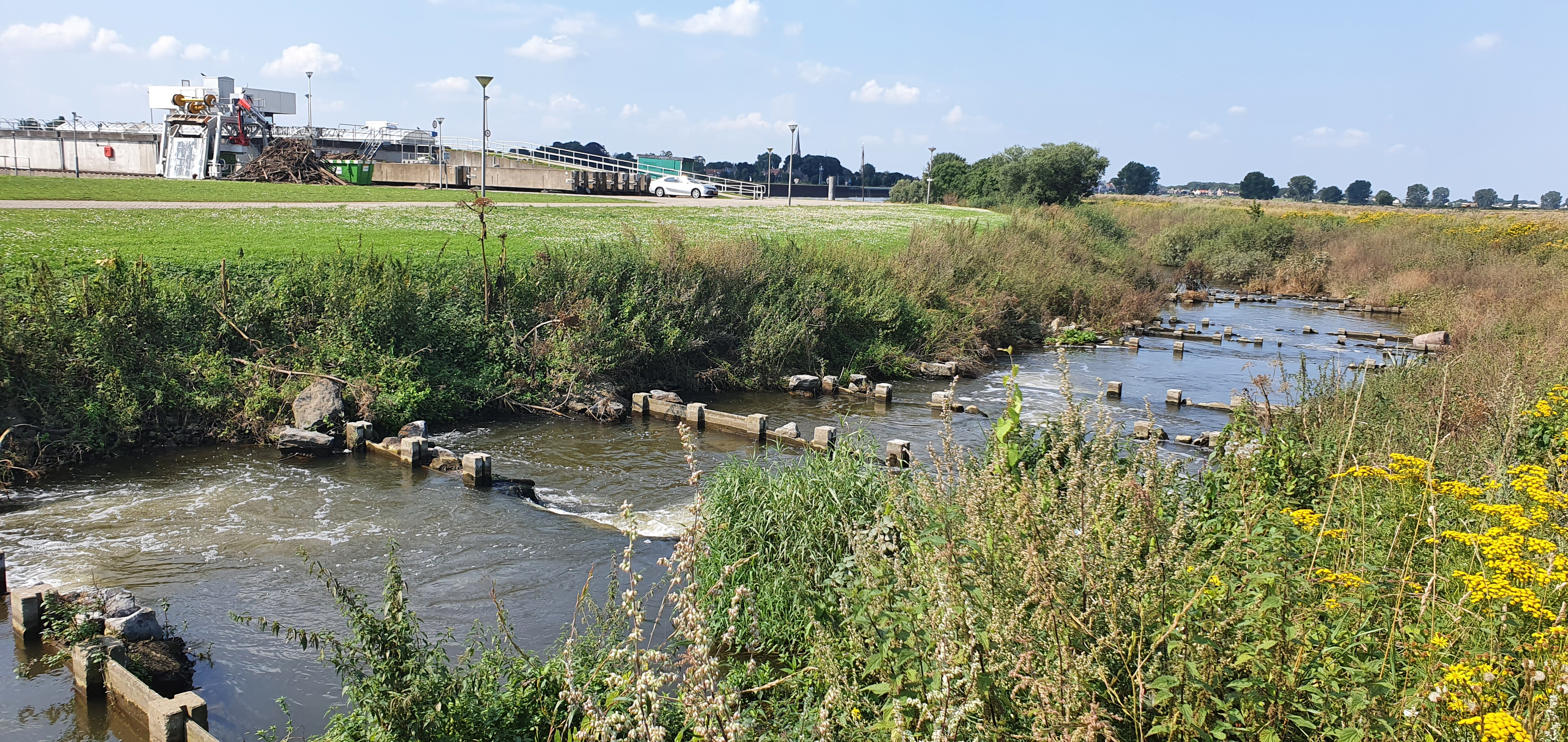
Fish ladder in Moordhuizen
