= West Maas en Waal =

- Municipality
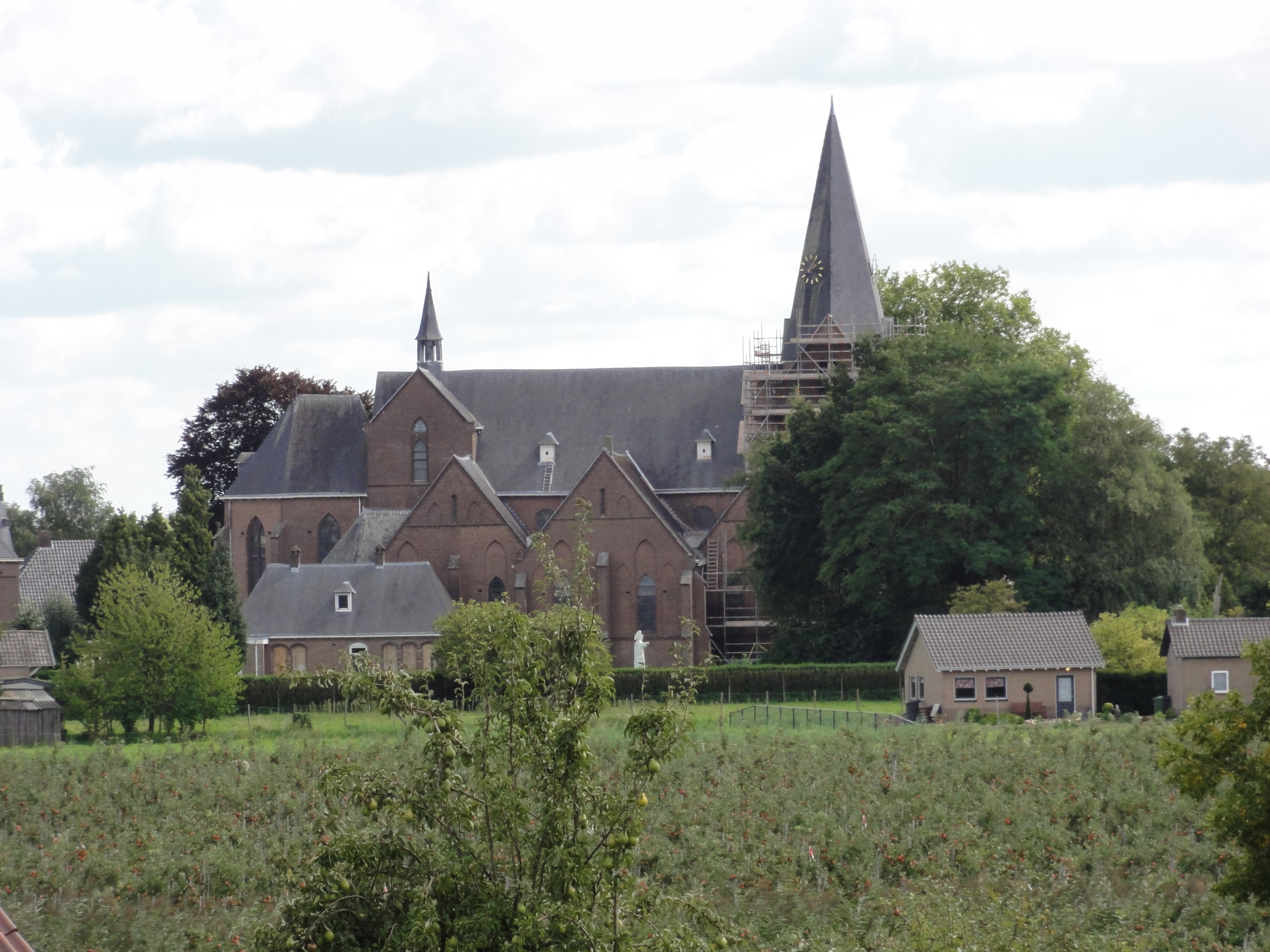
- Church in Boven-Leeuwen

- Flag Coat of arms

- Location in Gelderland
- Coordinates: 51°53′N 5°31′E
- Country: Netherlands
- Province: Gelderland
- Established: 1984

Government
  - Body: Municipal council
  - Mayor: Vincent van Neerbos (PvdA)

Area
  - Total: 85.21 km^{2} (32.90 sq mi)
  - Land: 76.76 km^{2} (29.64 sq mi)
  - Water: 8.45 km^{2} (3.26 sq mi)
- Elevation: 7 m (23 ft)

Population (January 2021)
  - Total: 19,581
  - Density: 255/km^{2} (660/sq mi)
- Time zone: UTC+1 (CET)
  - Summer (DST): UTC+2 (CEST)
- Postcode: 6620–6621, 6626–6629, 6657–6659
- Area code: 0487
- Website: www.westmaasenwaal.nl

West Maas en Waal (Dutch pronunciation: [ʋɛst ˈmaːs ɛɱ ˈʋaːl]) is a municipality in the Dutch province of Gelderland.

The municipality covers the western part of the Land van Maas en Waal, an island located between the Meuse and Waal rivers.

== Population centres ==
- Alphen aan de Maas
- Altforst
- Appeltern
- Beneden-Leeuwen
- Boven-Leeuwen
- Dreumel
- Maasbommel
- Moordhuizen
- Wamel

=== Topography ===
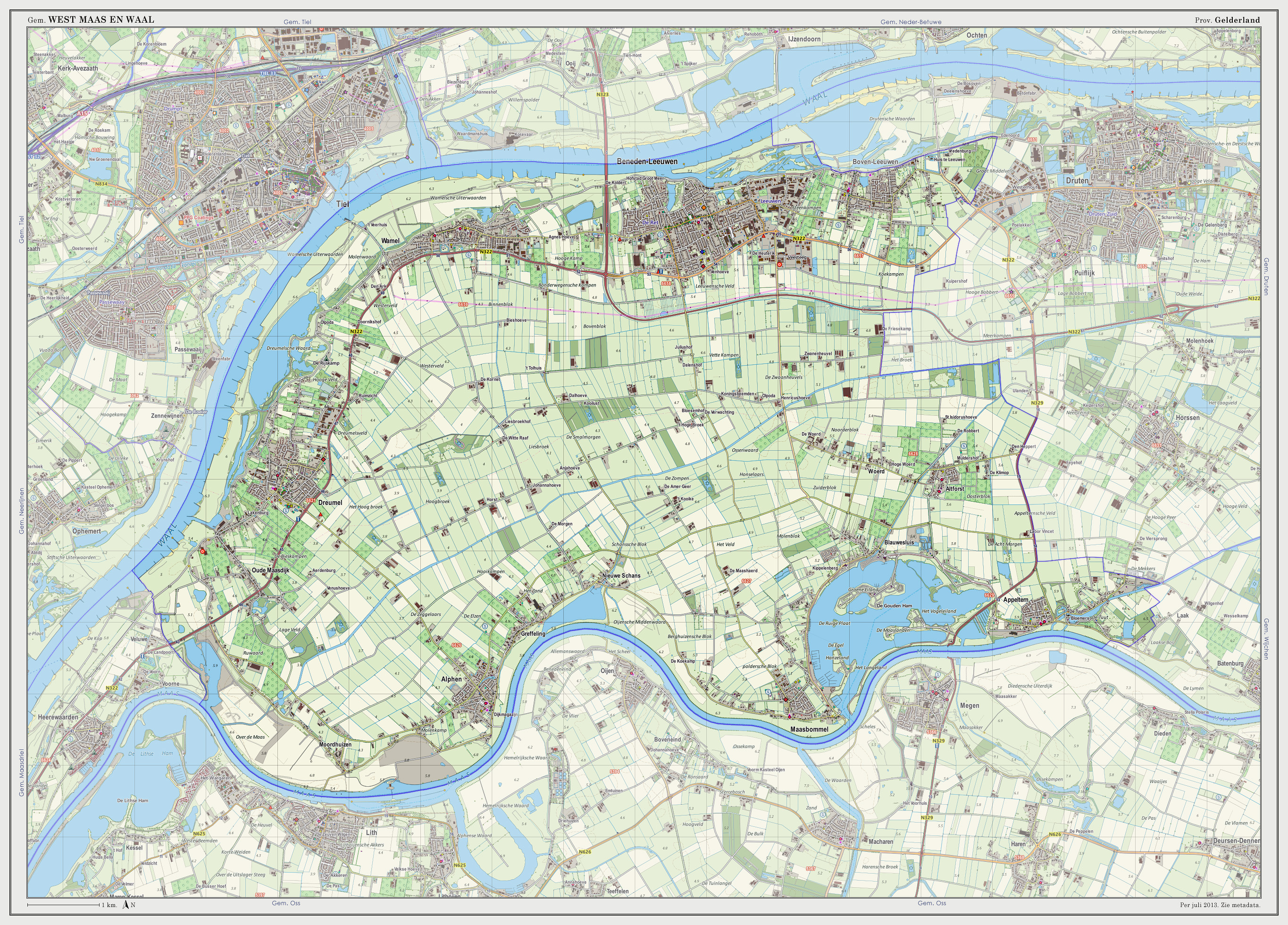

Dutch Topographic map of the municipality of West Maas en Waal, 2013.

== Demographics ==
- Dutch: 93.6%
- Black people: 0.4%
- European: 4.7
- Arabs: 0.4%
- Other non-Western: 0.9%:

== Notable people ==
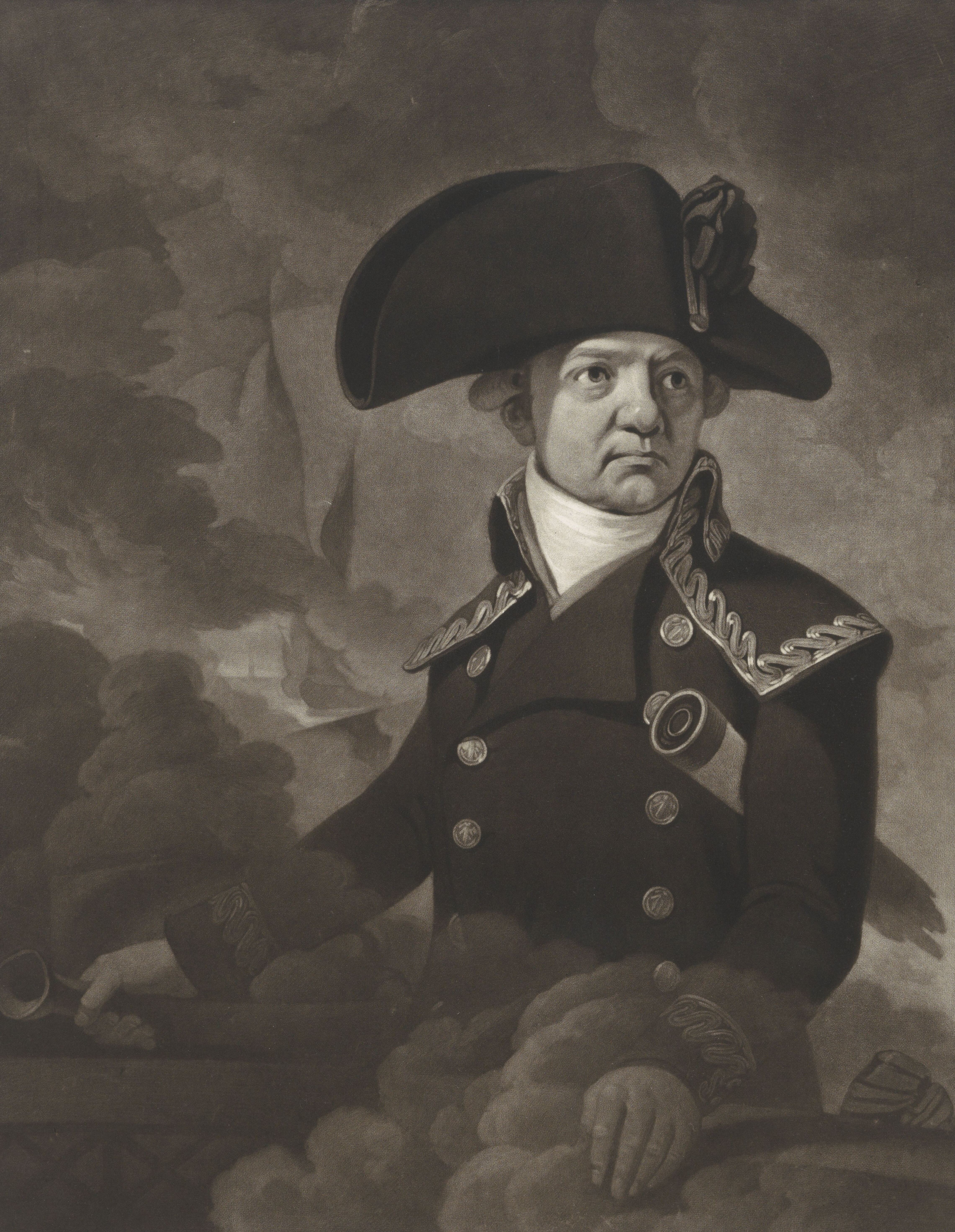
Samuel Story

- Samuel Story (1752 in Maasbommel – 1811) admiral in the Batavian Navy
- Jona Lendering (born 1964 in Beneden-Leeuwen) historian and the author of books on antiquity, Dutch history and modern management
- Marco Pastors (born 1965 in Beneden-Leeuwen) civil servant and former politician
- Iris van Herpen (born 1984 in Wamel) fashion designer, known for fusing technology with traditional Couture craftsmanship

=== Sport ===
- Jan van Deinsen (born 1953) a retired football midfielder, 276 caps
- Ivo den Bieman (born 1967 in Wamel) retired footballer, played mainly in Scotland with about 260 caps
- Arno van Zwam (born 1969 in Beneden-Leeuwen) former football goalkeeper, over 300 caps

== Gallery ==
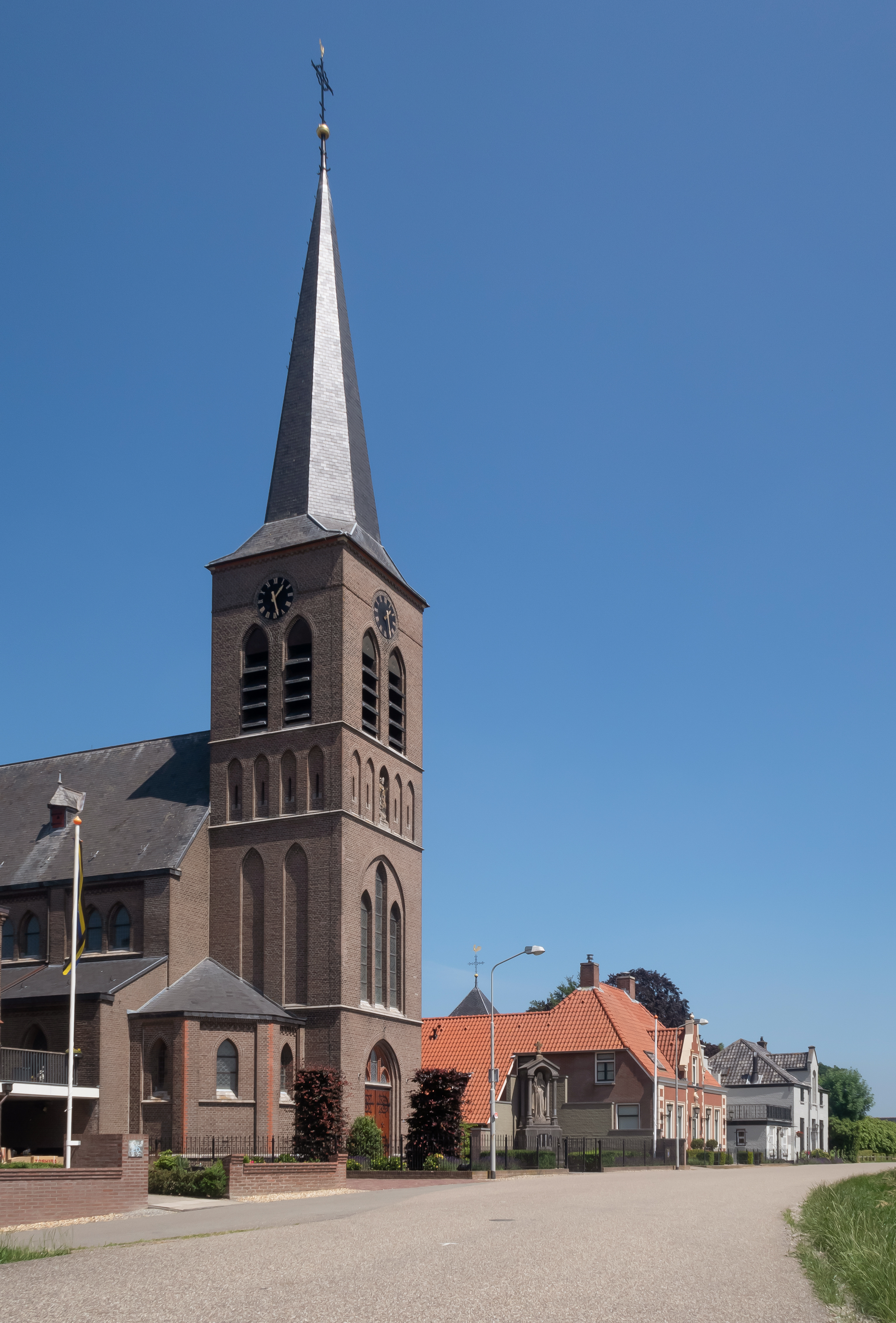
Appeltern, kerk

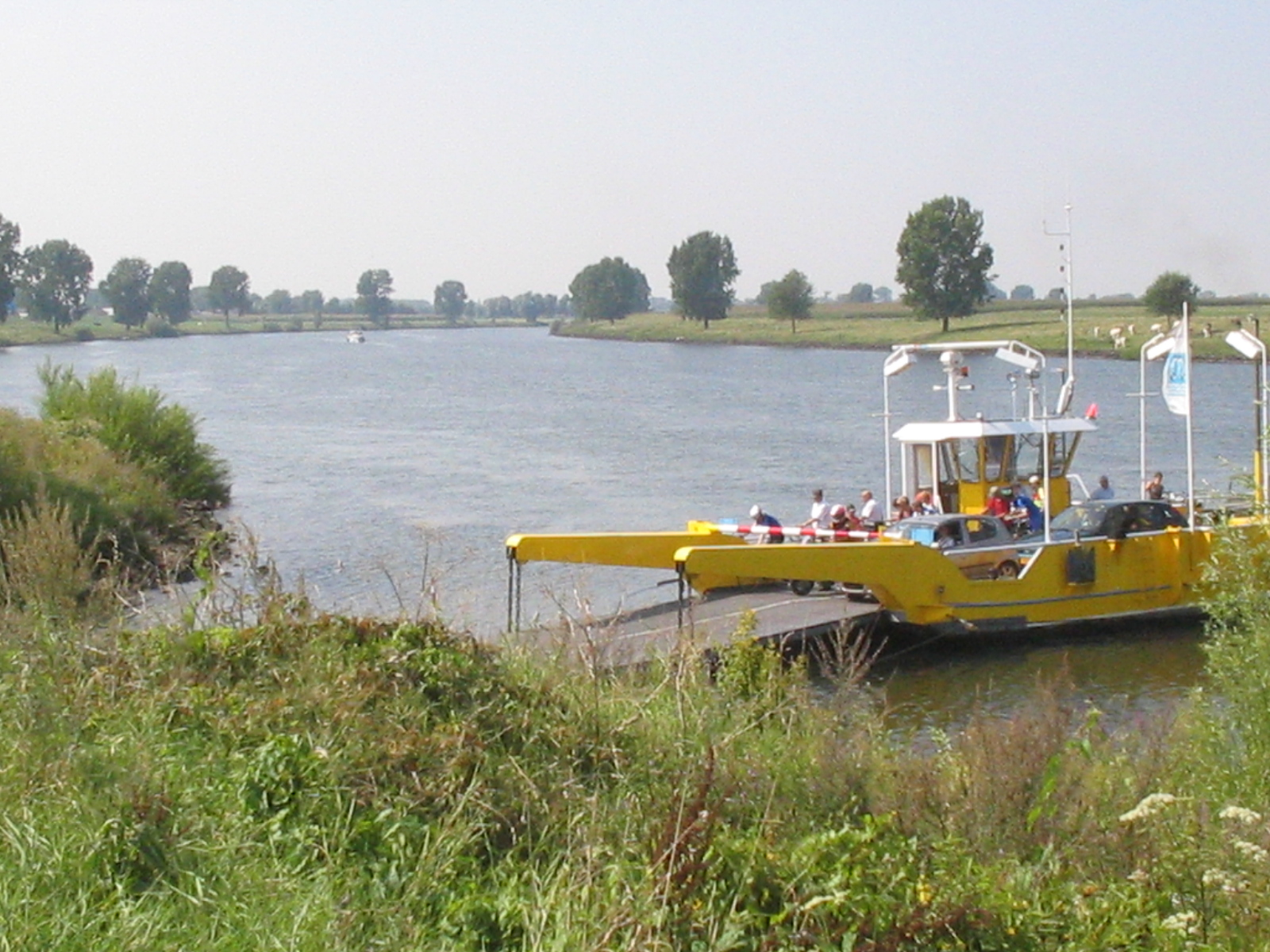
Ferry at the village of Lith

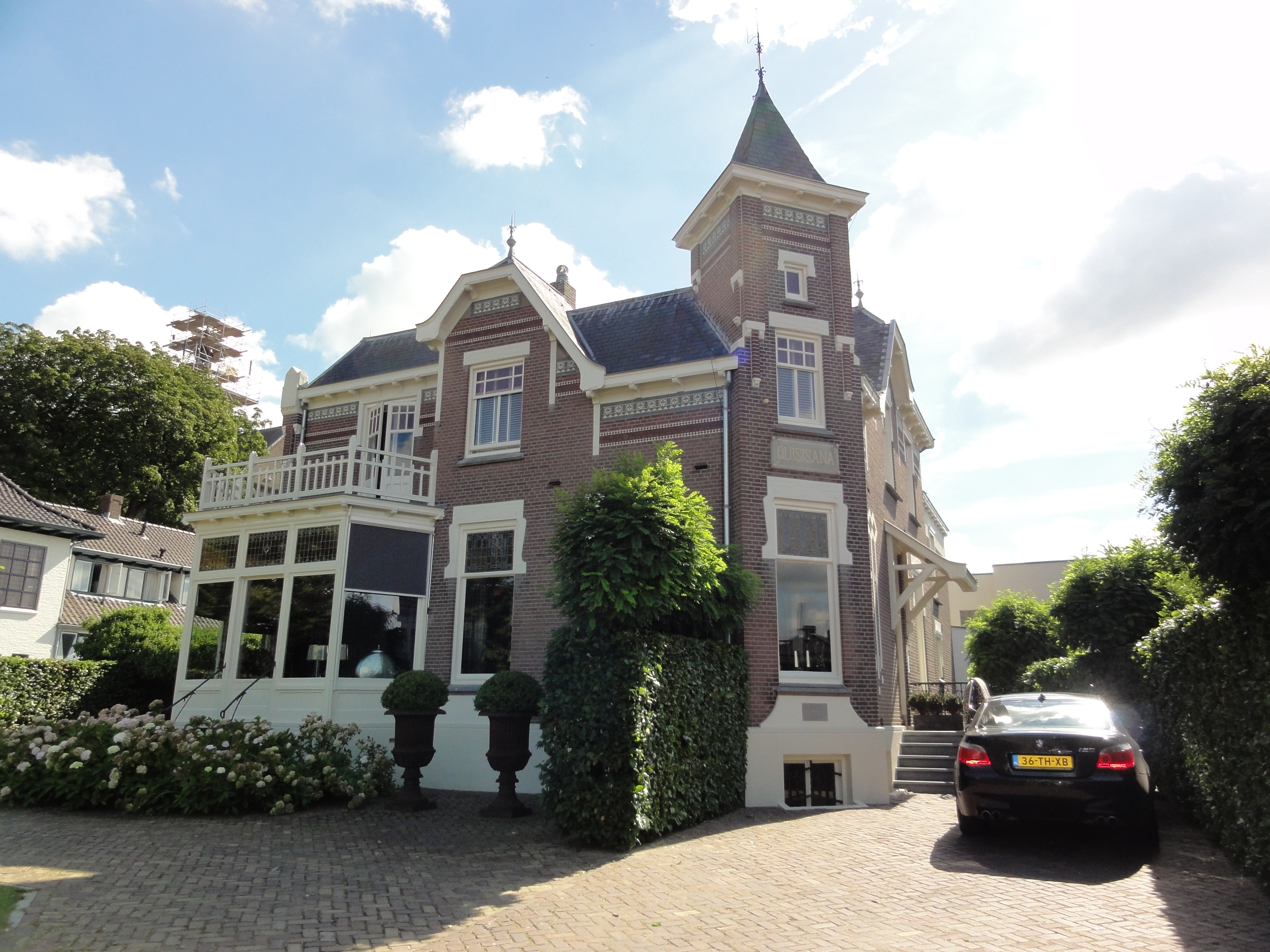
Beneden-Leeuwen, Quisisana Zandstraat

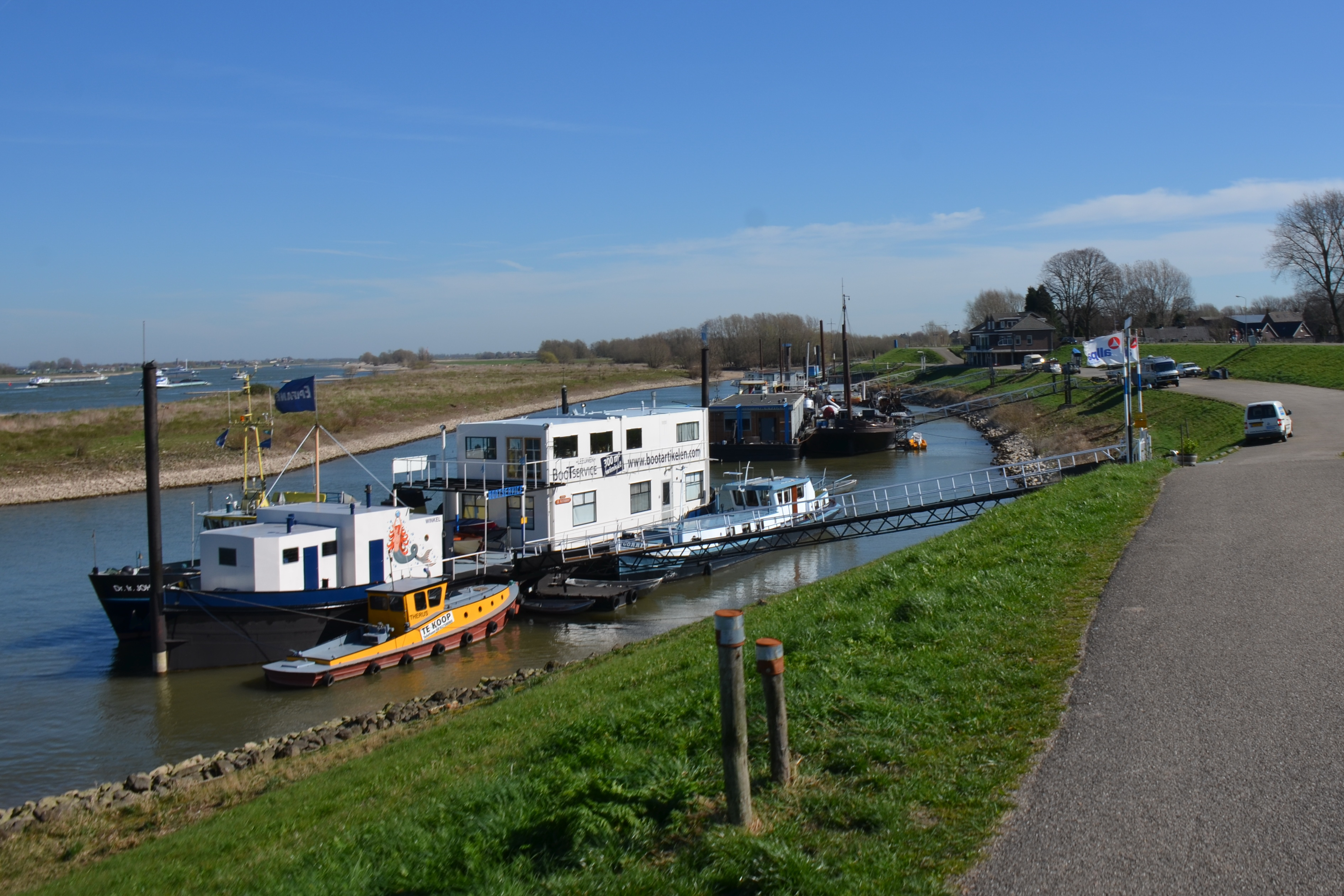
The Waalriver with a harbour and industrial activities

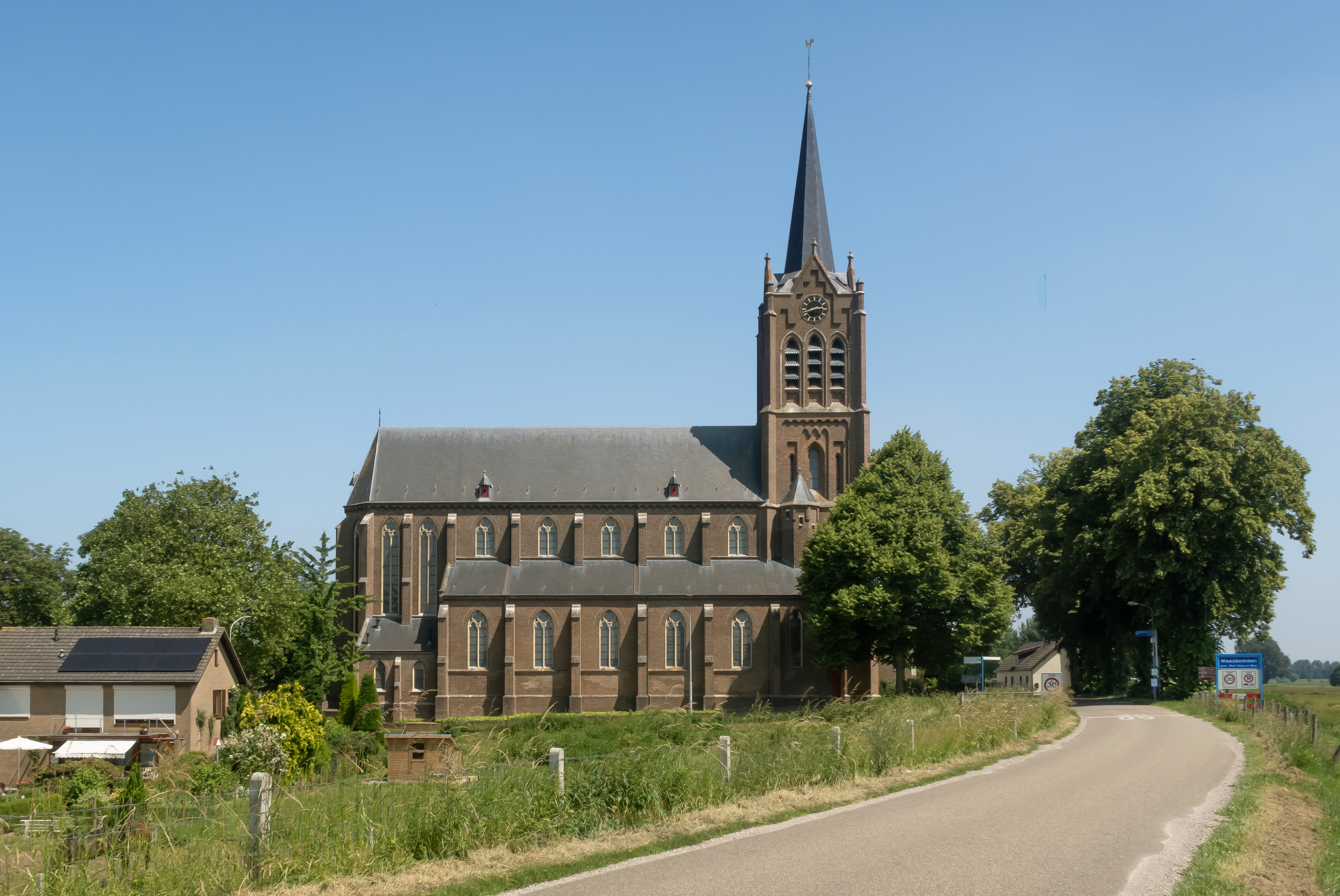
Maasbommel, church: the Sint-Lambertuskerk

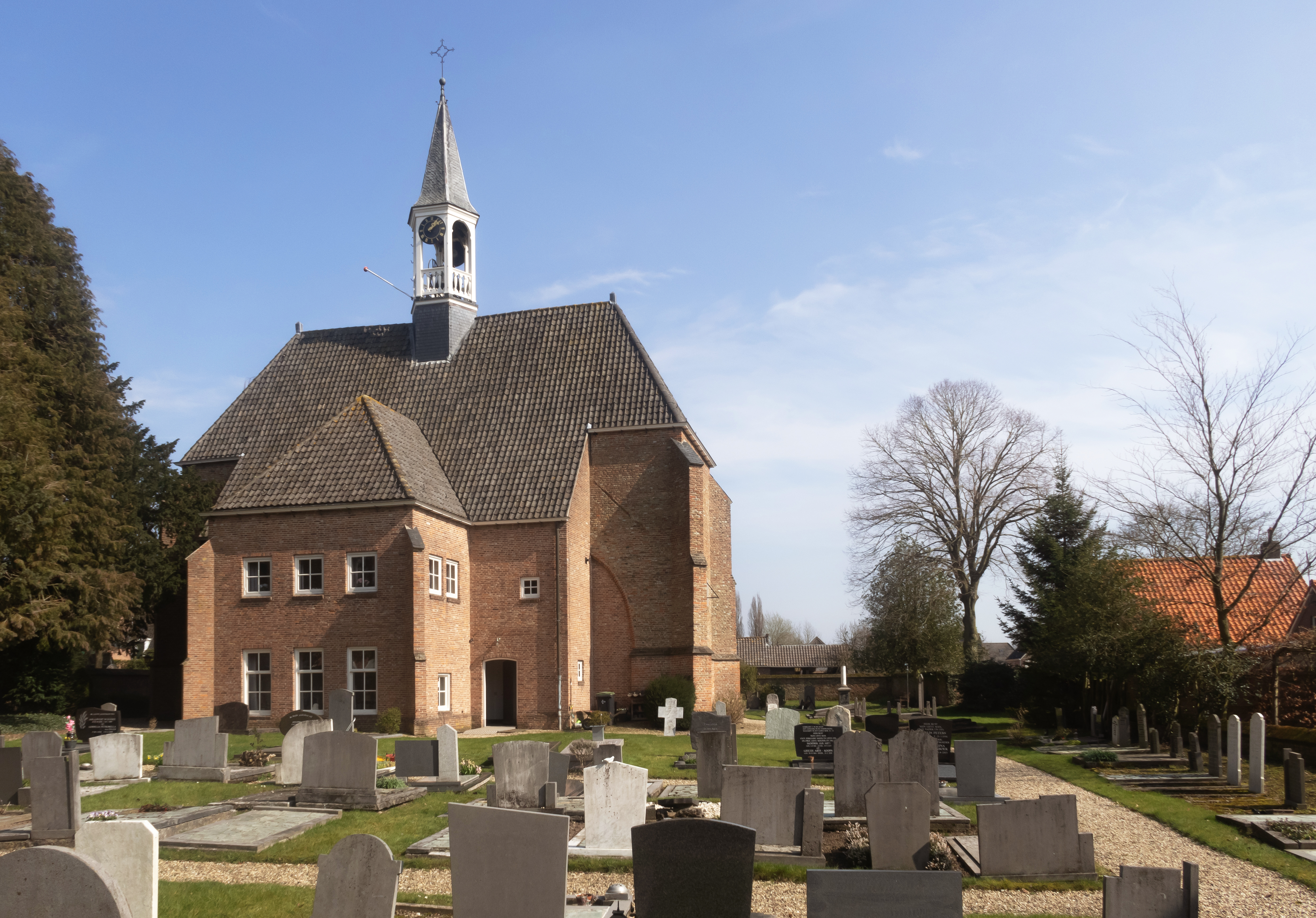
Wamel, reformed church
