= Dreumel =

- Village
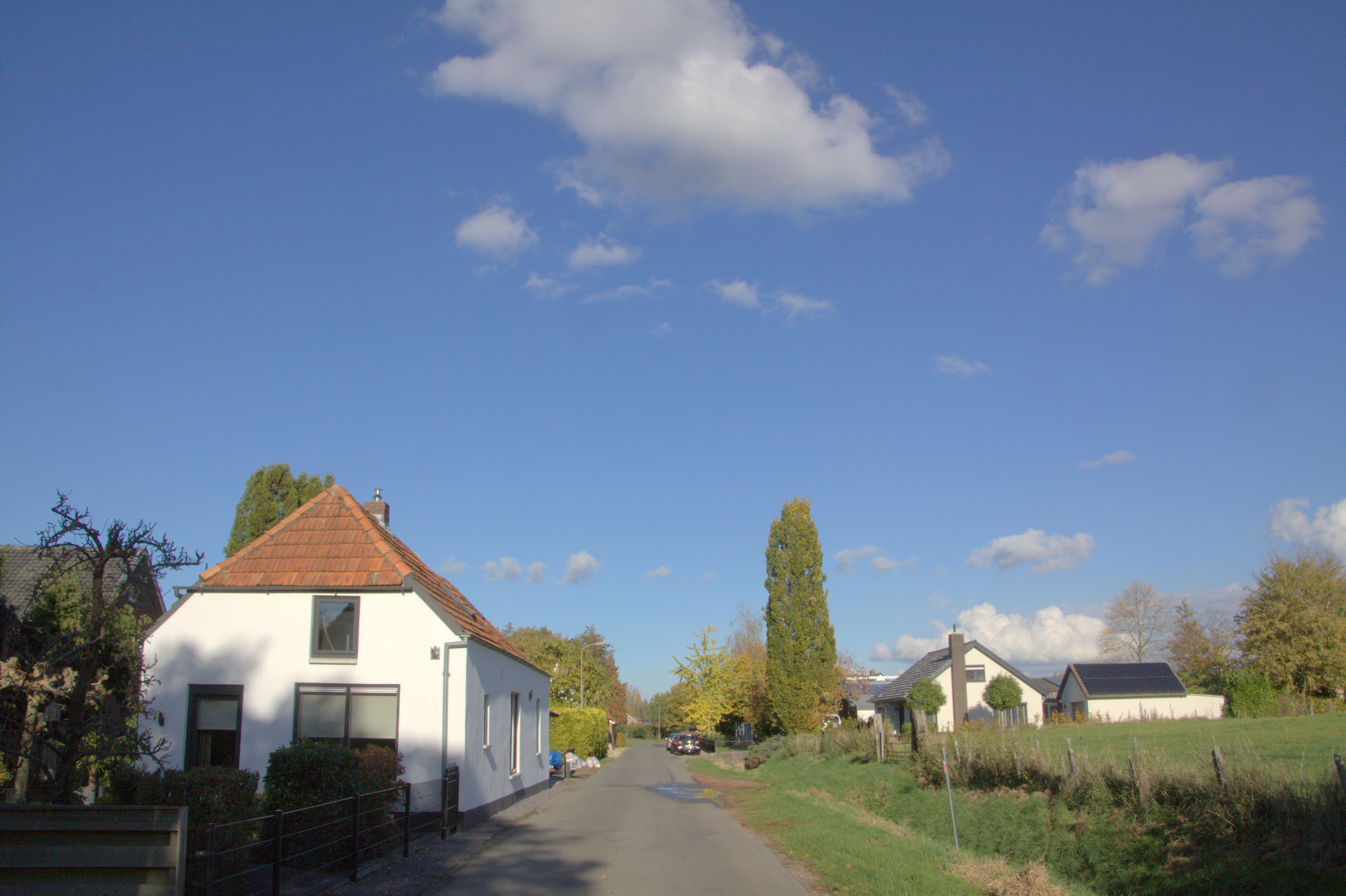
- View on Dreumel

- Coat of arms

- Location in the Netherlands Dreumel (Netherlands)
- Coordinates: 51.8494°N 5.4304°E
- Country: Netherlands
- Province: Gelderland
- Municipality: West Maas en Waal

Area
  - Total: 18.56 km^{2} (7.17 sq mi)
- Elevation: 5 m (16 ft)

Population (2021)
  - Total: 3,520
  - Density: 190/km^{2} (491/sq mi)
- Time zone: UTC+1 (CET)
  - Summer (DST): UTC+2 (CEST)
- Postal code: 6620-6621
- Dialing code: 0487

Dreumel is a village in the Dutch province of Gelderland. It is a part of the municipality of West Maas en Waal, and lies about 4 km south of Tiel.

Dreumel was a separate municipality until 1984, when it was merged with Wamel.

== History ==
It was first mentioned in 893 as Tremele. The etymology is unclear. The village developed along the Waal. The earliest houses were on Hogeweg and Rooysestraat. In the 14th century, there was a concentration around the church. The tower of Dutch Reformed Church dates from the 15th century and has elements from the 11th or 12th century. The church is from the 19th century. The Roman Catholic Church was built between 1868 and 1870. The tower was constructed in 1925. In 1840, it was home to 1,648 people.

On the night of 4 to 5 March 1855, the dike breached which resulted in the destruction of Dreumel, and caused six deaths. In 1893, a monument was placed in Dreumel. The grist mill of Dreumel dates from 1845. In 1930, an electric motor was installed in the wind mill and the hood was removed. It remained in operation, but could only work on the engine. The wind mill was restored in 2009, and is once again able to grind on wind power.

== Transportation ==
The best place to reach by public transport is 's-Hertogenbosch railway station, by using bus service 165, or the less frequent 164.

The nearest railway station Tiel, Oss or Zaltbommel.

== Gallery ==
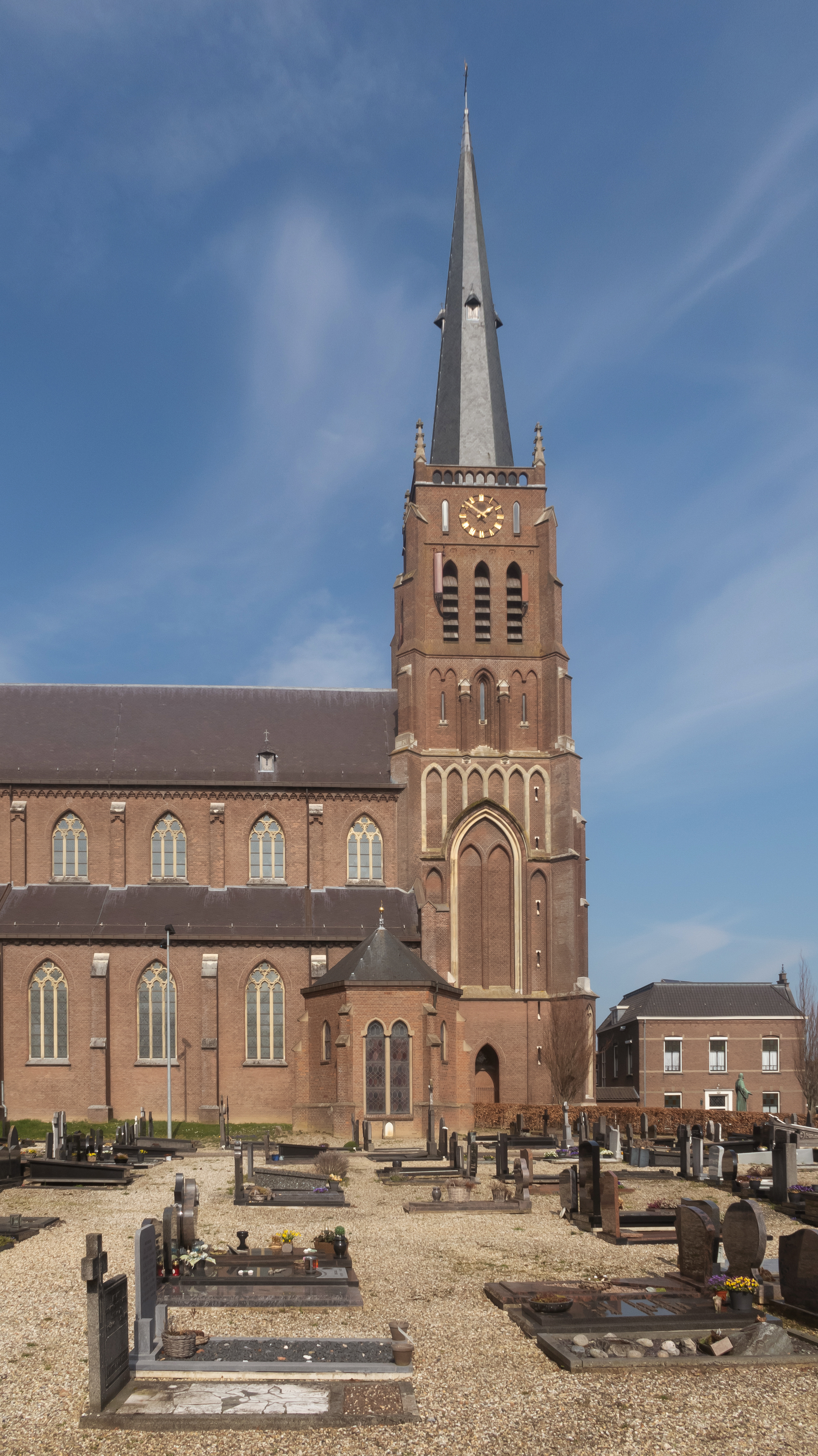
Church: the Sint Barbarakerk

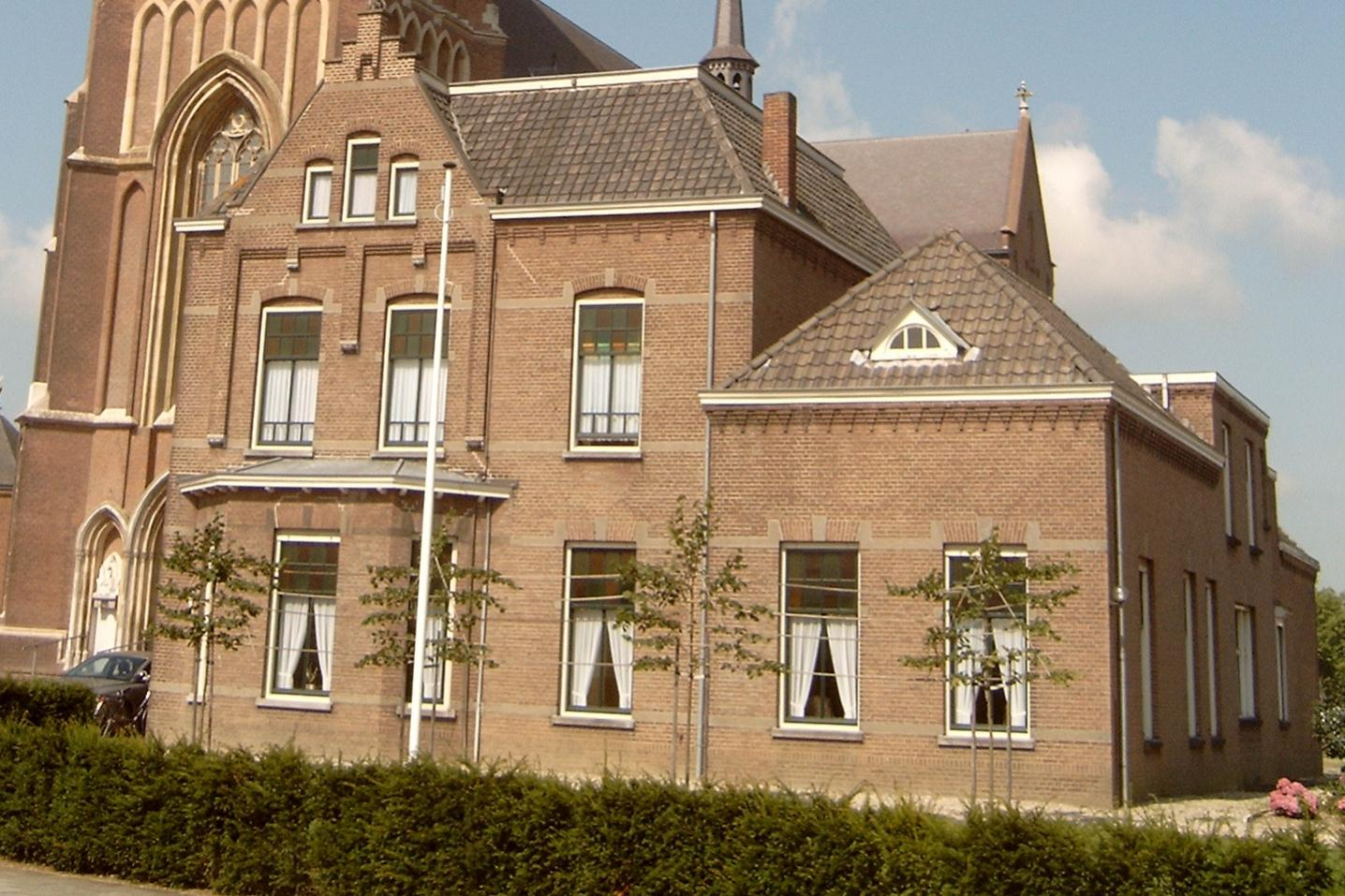
Clergy house

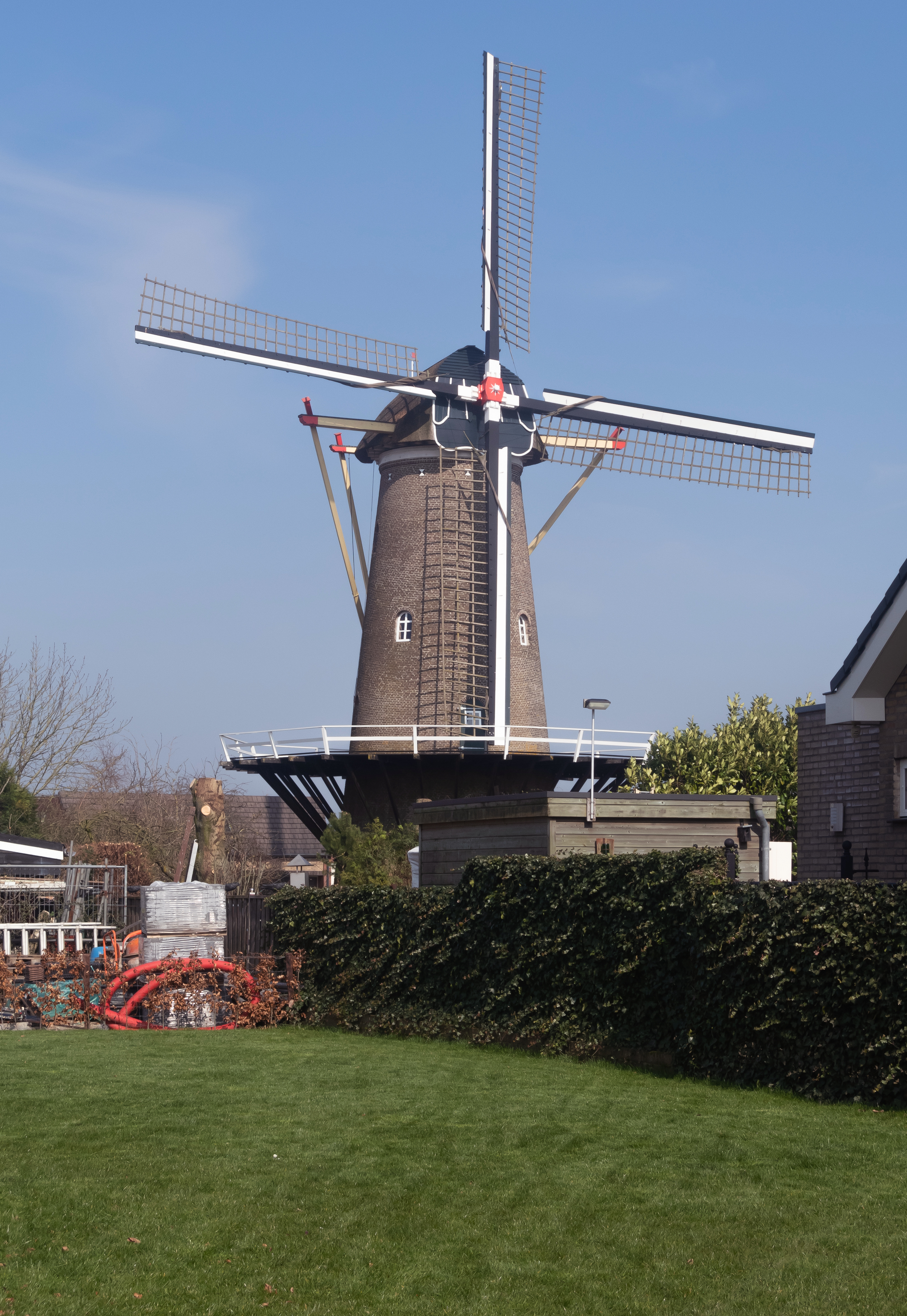
The grist mill of Dreumel

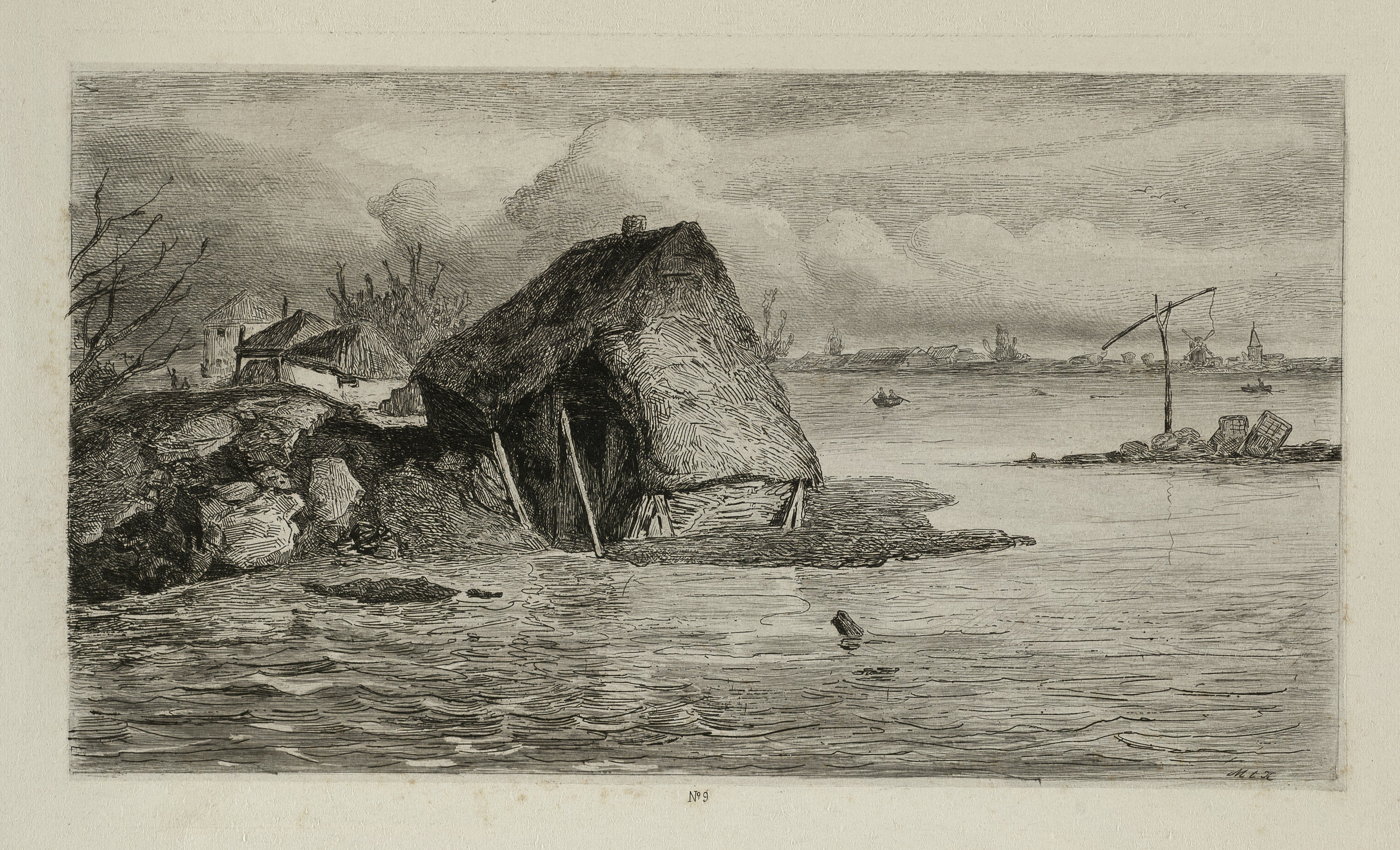
Drawing of the 1855 flood
