= Altforst =

- Village
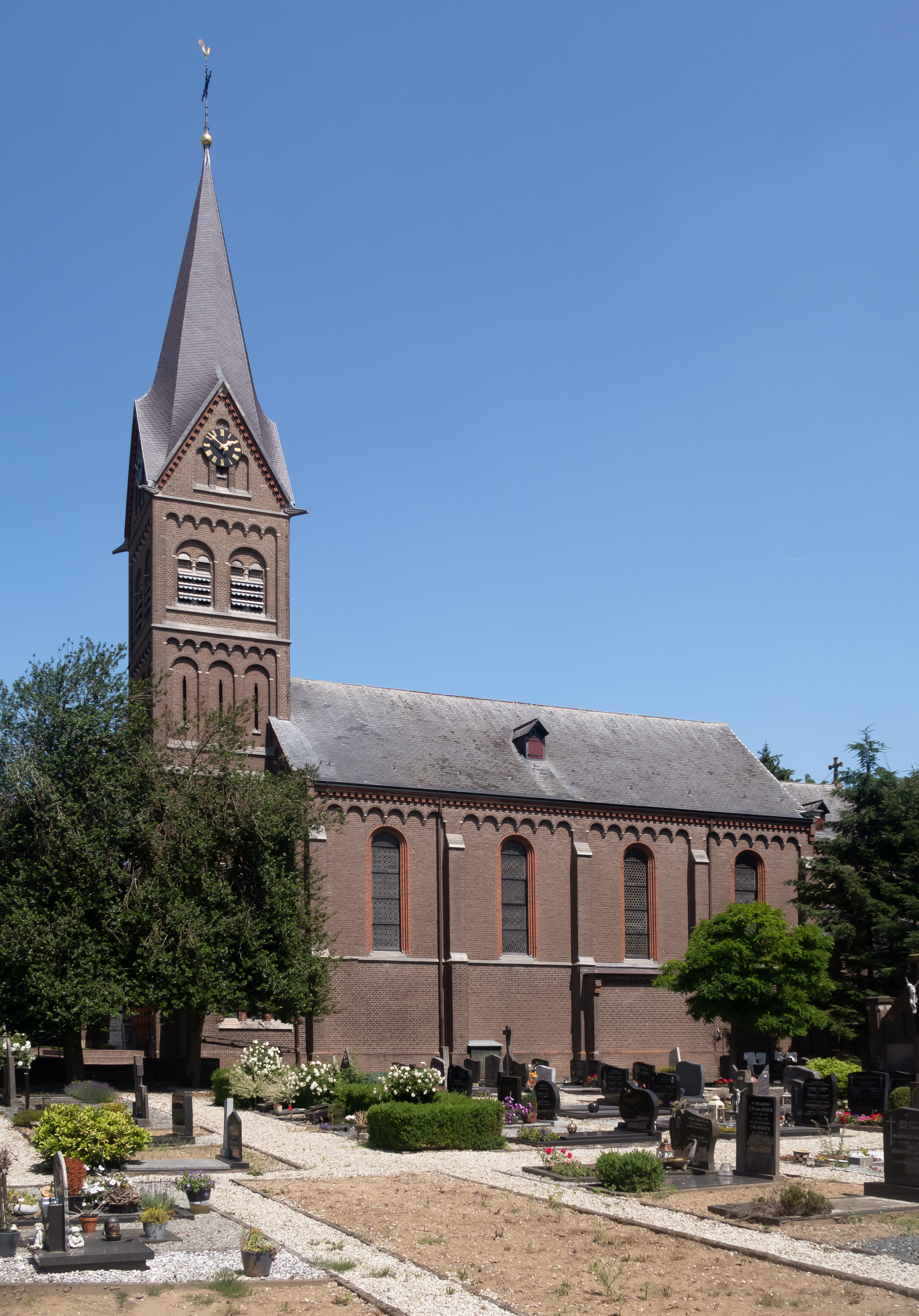
- Church: the Sint-Donatuskerk

- Location in the Netherlands Altforst (Netherlands)
- Coordinates: 51°51′N 5°34′E
- Country: Netherlands
- Province: Gelderland
- Municipality: West Maas en Waal

Area
  - Total: 7.41 km^{2} (2.86 sq mi)
- Elevation: 6 m (20 ft)

Population (2021)
  - Total: 580
  - Density: 78/km^{2} (200/sq mi)
- Time zone: UTC+1 (CET)
  - Summer (DST): UTC+2 (CEST)
- Postal code: 6628
- Dialing code: 0487

Altforst is a village in the Dutch province of Gelderland. It is a part of the municipality of West Maas en Waal, and lies about 10 km north of Oss.

It was first mentioned in 1134 as Altfurse, and means "old settlement near furze (ulex europaeus)". The village started as a deforestation settlement. It was a low-lying area, and therefore, three artificial mounds have been erected in the village. The Dutch Reformed Church dates from 1824 and was decommissioned in 1970. In 1840, it was home to 281 people. The Roman Catholic Church dates from 1891 and is the replacement of a barn church.

== Gallery ==
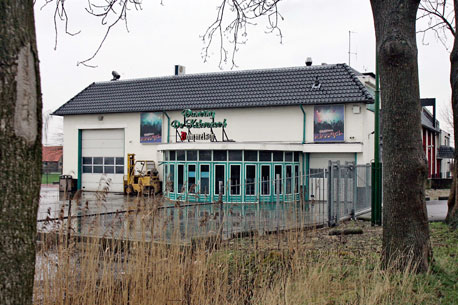
Discotheque in Altforst

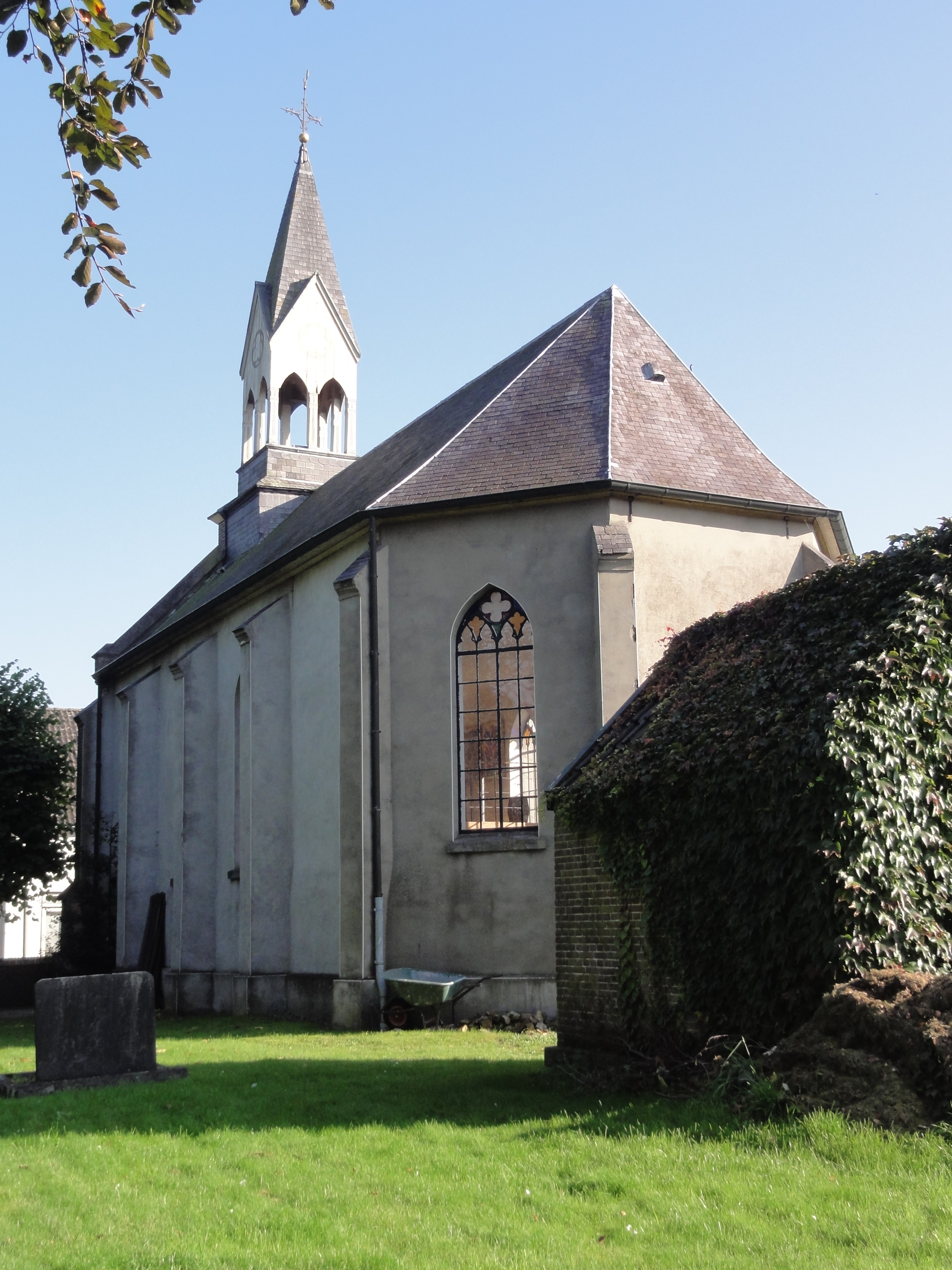
Dutch Reformed Church
