= Appeltern =

- Village
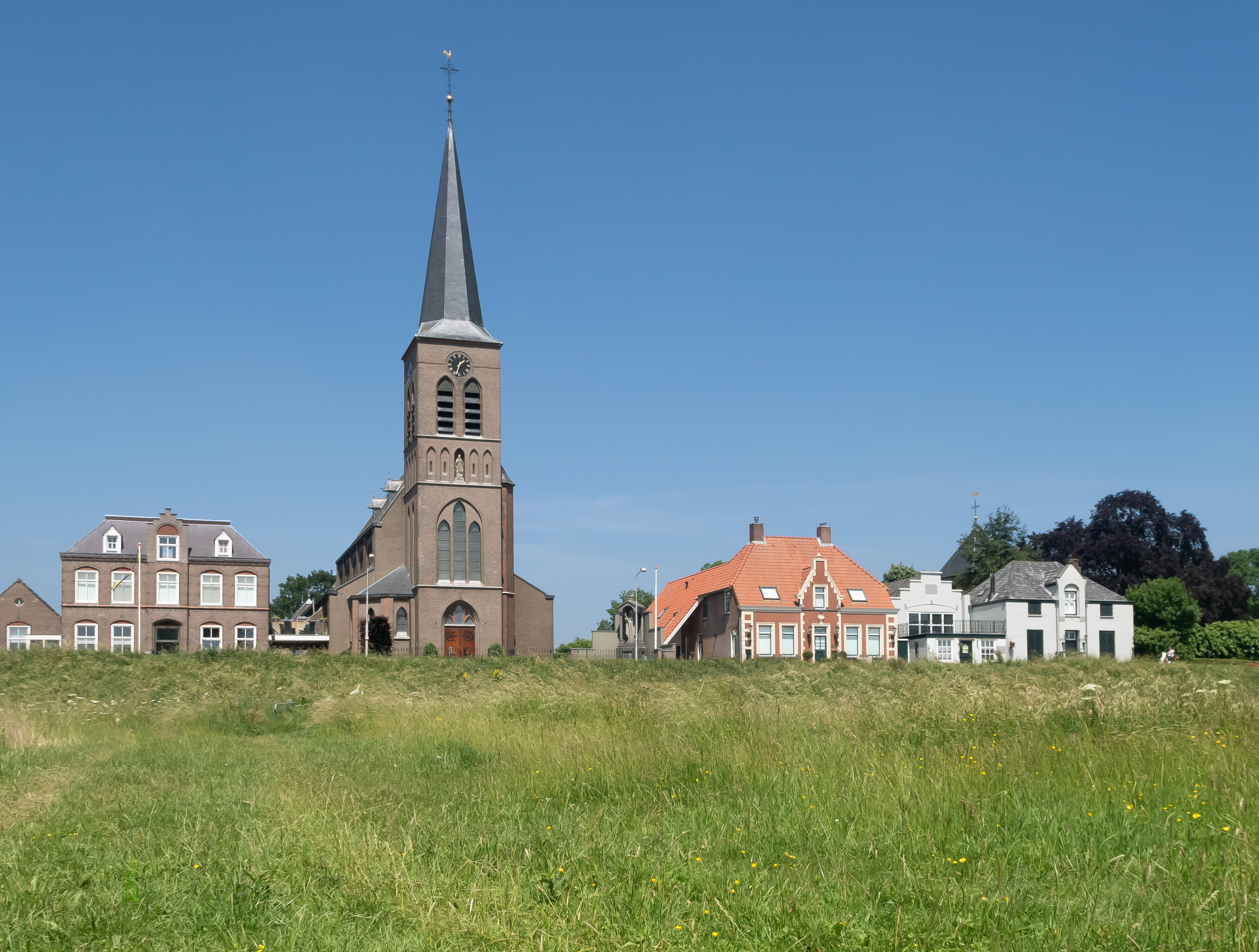
- View on the village

- Coat of arms

- Location in the Netherlands Appeltern (Netherlands)
- Coordinates: 51°50′N 5°35′E
- Country: Netherlands
- Province: Gelderland
- Municipality: West Maas en Waal

Area
  - Total: 6.33 km^{2} (2.44 sq mi)
- Elevation: 7 m (23 ft)

Population (2021)
  - Total: 805
  - Density: 127/km^{2} (329/sq mi)
- Time zone: UTC+1 (CET)
  - Summer (DST): UTC+2 (CEST)
- Postal code: 6629
- Dialing code: 0487

Appeltern is a village in the Dutch province of Gelderland. It is a part of the municipality of West Maas en Waal, and lies about 9 km northeast of Oss. Until 1984, Appeltern was an independent municipality.

== History ==
It was first mentioned in 1139 as de Apeltre, and means "settlement near apple trees". The village developed along the Maas. The tower of Dutch Reformed Church is from the 12th century. The choir dates around 1400. In 1859, the church and tower were modified into a single building. Huis Appeltern was a manor house built in the late-17th century. It was demolished in 1881 and only the northern wing remains. In 1840, Appeltern was home to 567 people.

Steam pumping station De Tuut was constructed between 1918 and 1919 as one of the last steam powered pumping station. It was decommissioned in 1969 when it was replaced by the Diesel powered Bloemers pumping station.

== Gallery ==
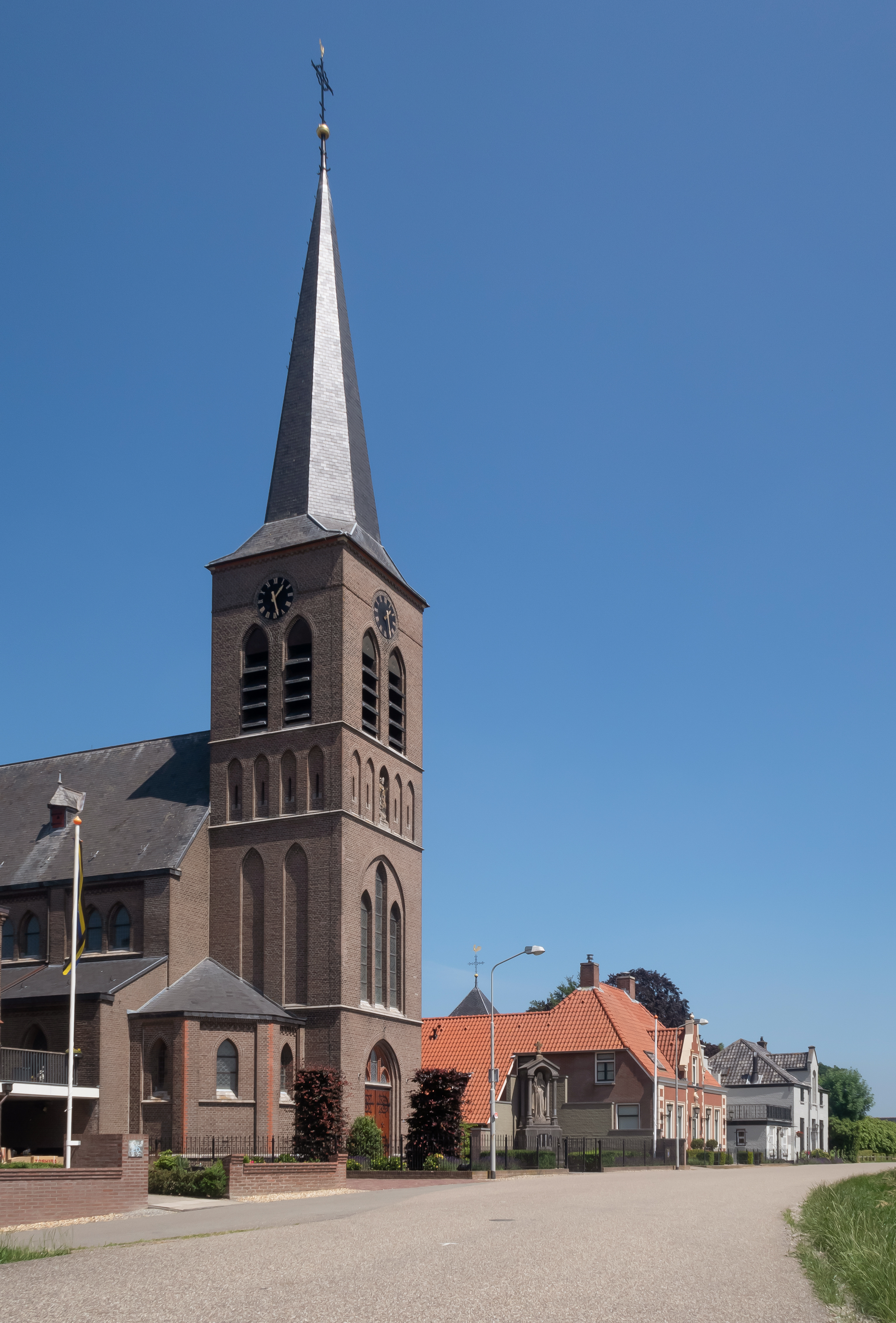
Church, the Sint Servatiuskerk

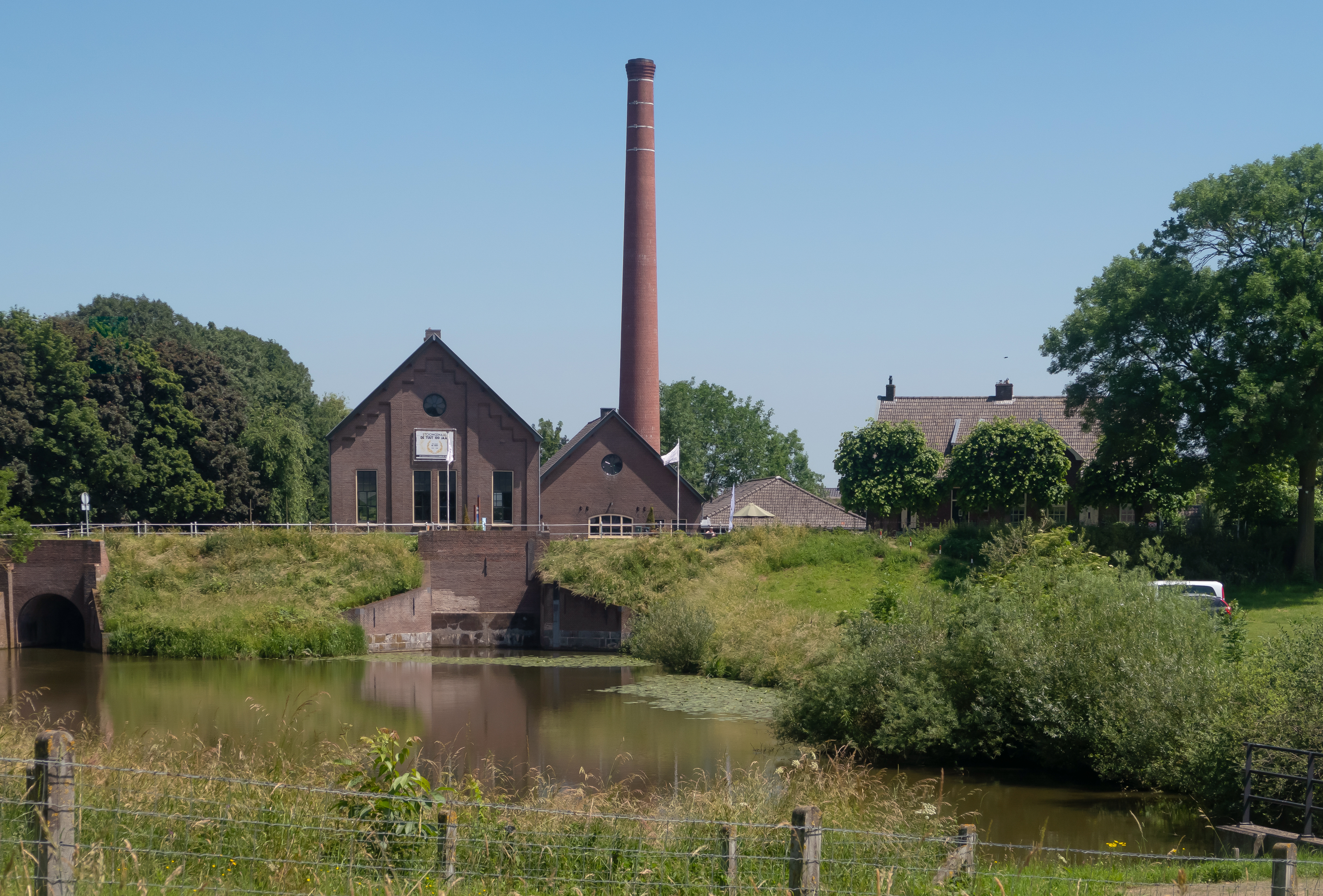
Pumping station: stoomgemaal de Tuut

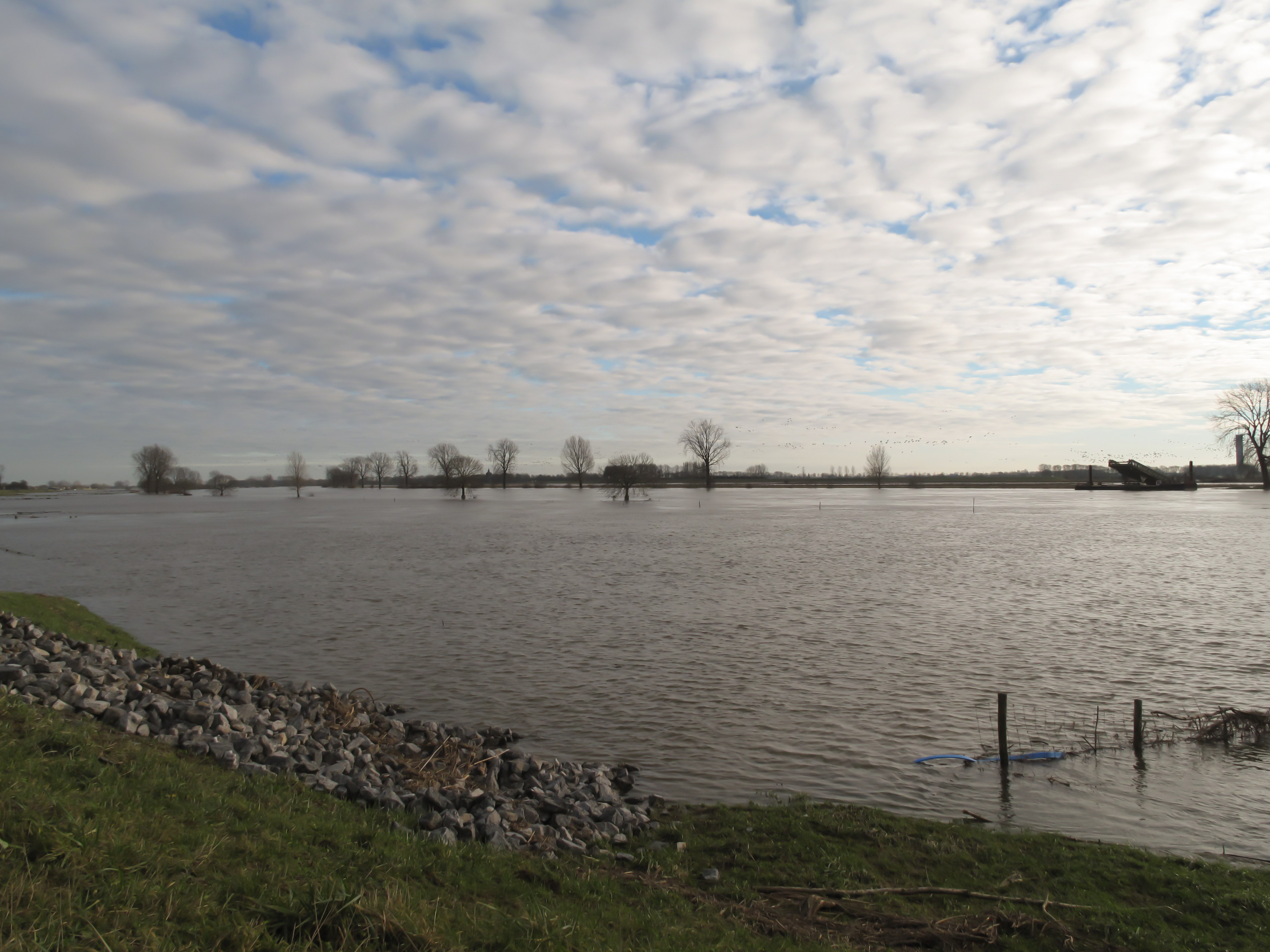
The Maas near Appeltern

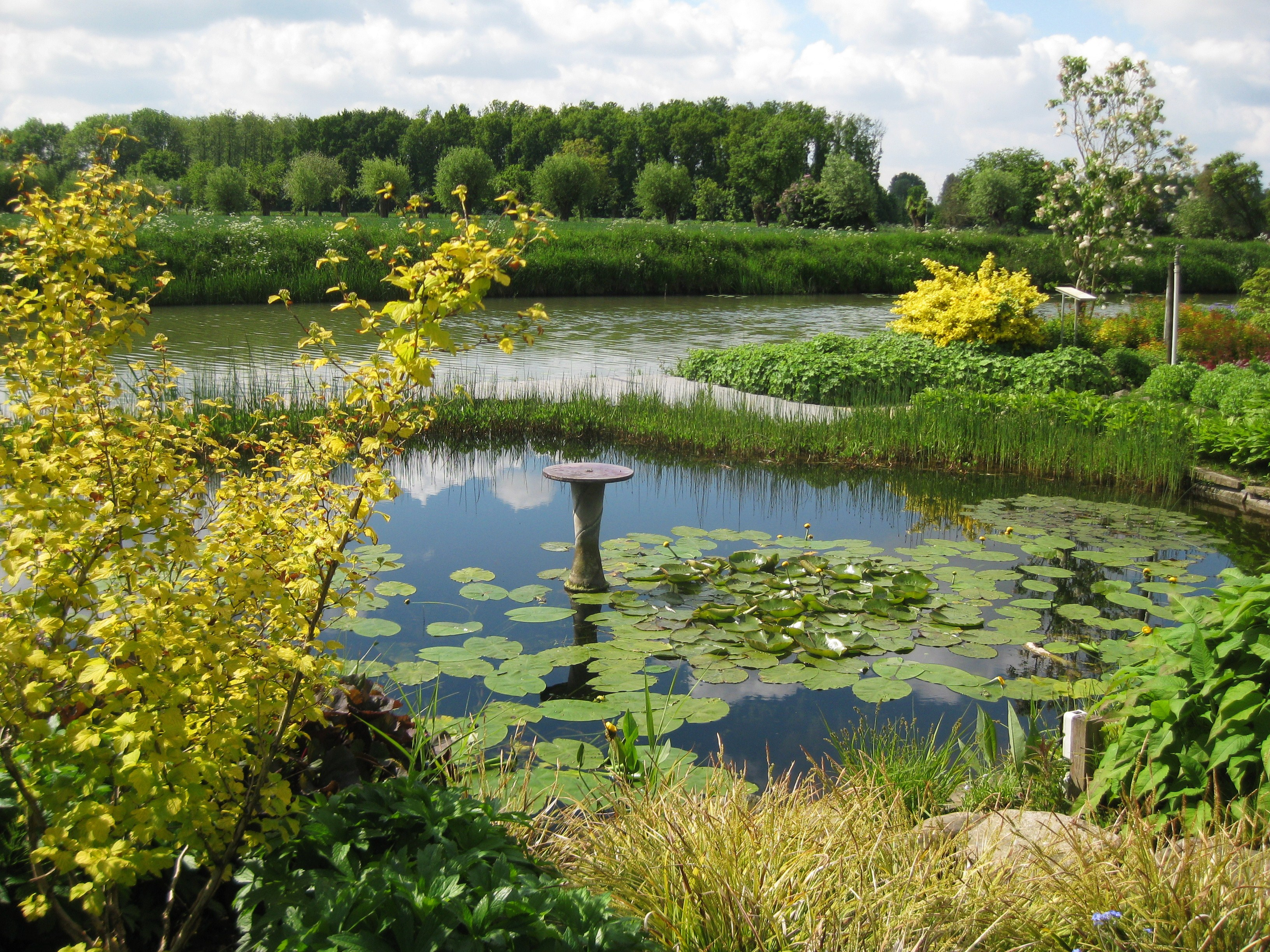
Garden of Appeltern
