= Bize =

Bize is an alternative spelling of the wind called the Bise.

It is also the name or part of the name of the following places:

- Bize, Albania, a village in Albania
- Bize, Haute-Marne, in the Haute-Marne department in France
- Bize, Hautes-Pyrénées, in the Hautes-Pyrénées department in France
- Bize-Minervois, in the Aude department in France
