= Pressigny =

Pressigny may refer to the following places in France:

- Pressigny, Haute-Marne, a commune in the Haute-Marne department
- Pressigny, Deux-Sèvres, a commune in the Deux-Sèvres department
