= Maizières-sur-Amance =

- Commune
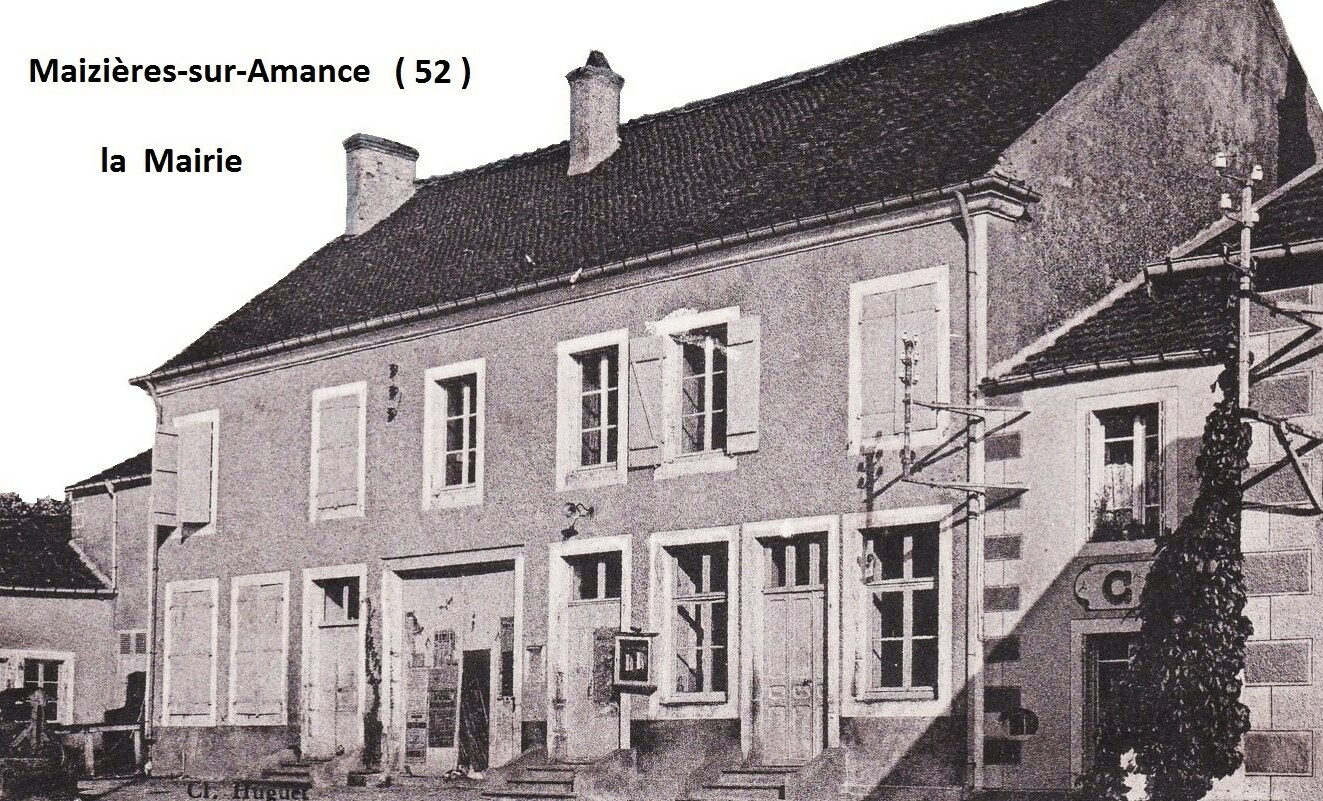
- Maizières-sur-Amance Town hall
- Location of Maizières-sur-Amance
- Location within France Location within Grand Est
- Coordinates: 47°49′41″N 5°36′42″E
- Country: France
- Region: Grand Est
- Department: Haute-Marne
- Arrondissement: Langres
- Canton: Chalindrey

Government
  - Mayor (2020–2026): Nadine Mussot
- Area^{1}: 7.97 km^{2} (3.08 sq mi)
- Elevation: 323 m (1,060 ft)
- Highest elevation: 327 m (1,073 ft)
- Lowest elevation: 232 m (761 ft)
- Population (2023): 95
  - Density: 12/km^{2} (31/sq mi)
- Time zone: UTC+01:00 (CET)
  - Summer (DST): UTC+02:00 (CEST)
- INSEE/Postal code: 52303 /52500
- ^{1} French Land Register data, which excludes lakes, ponds, glaciers > 1 km^{2} (0.386 sq mi or 247 acres) and river estuaries.

Maizières-sur-Amance (French pronunciation: [mɛzjɛʁ syʁ amɑ̃s], literally Maizières on Amance) is a commune in the Haute-Marne department in north-eastern France.

== See also ==
- Communes of the Haute-Marne department
