= Pierremont-sur-Amance =

- Commune
- Location of Pierremont-sur-Amance
- Location within France Location within Grand Est
- Coordinates: 47°47′57″N 5°39′34″E
- Country: France
- Region: Grand Est
- Department: Haute-Marne
- Arrondissement: Langres
- Canton: Chalindrey

Government
  - Mayor (2020–2026): Jean-Marc Linotte
- Area^{1}: 16.27 km^{2} (6.28 sq mi)
- Elevation: 320 m (1,050 ft)
- Highest elevation: 366 m (1,201 ft)
- Lowest elevation: 232 m (761 ft)
- Population (2023): 148
  - Density: 9.10/km^{2} (23.6/sq mi)
- Time zone: UTC+01:00 (CET)
  - Summer (DST): UTC+02:00 (CEST)
- INSEE/Postal code: 52388 /52500
- ^{1} French Land Register data, which excludes lakes, ponds, glaciers > 1 km^{2} (0.386 sq mi or 247 acres) and river estuaries.

Pierremont-sur-Amance (French pronunciation: [pjɛʁmɔ̃ syʁ amɑ̃s], literally Pierremont on Amance) is a commune in the Haute-Marne department in north-eastern France.

== See also ==
- Communes of the Haute-Marne department
