= Haute-Amance =

- Commune
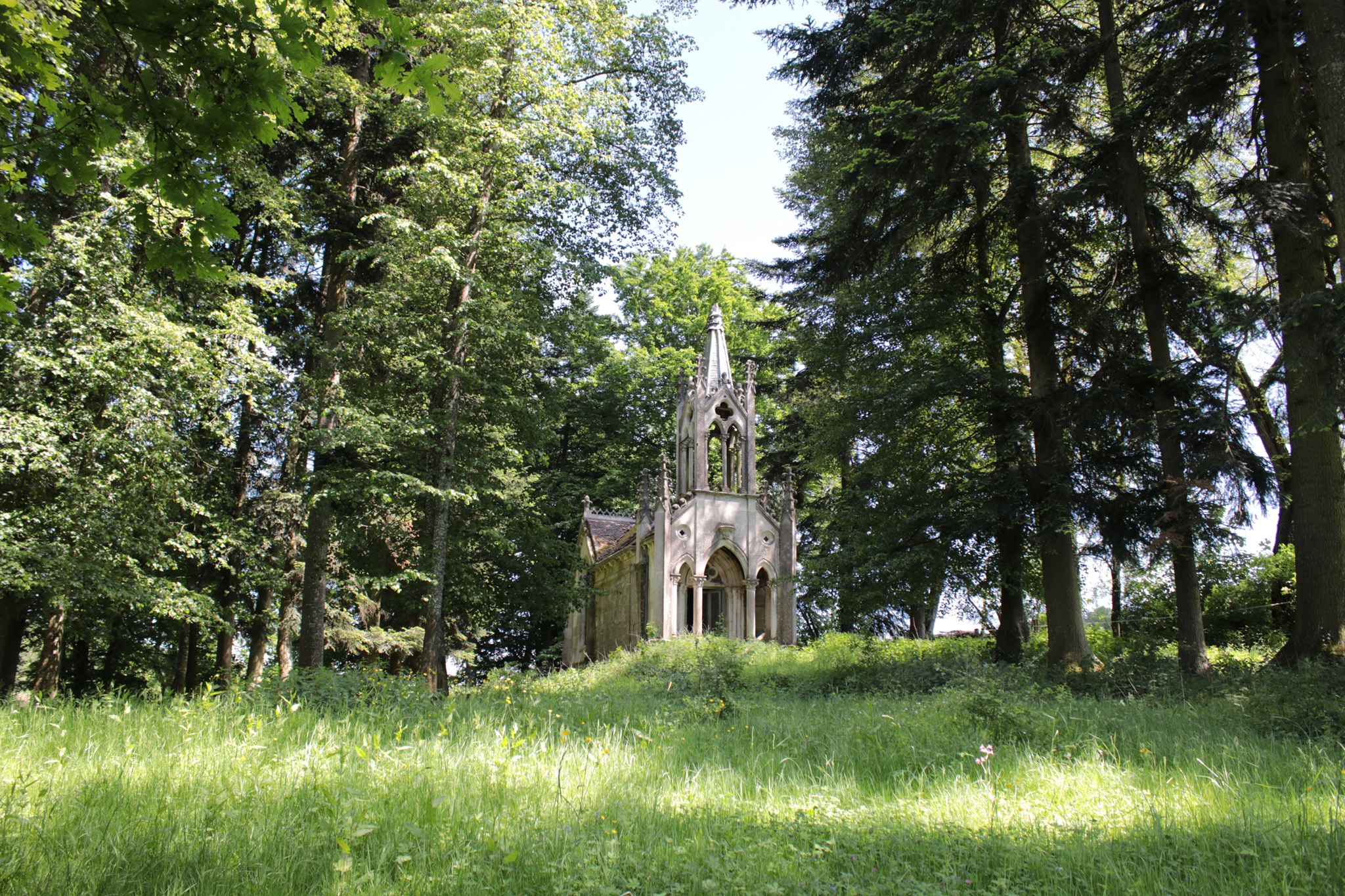
- The Beaulieu chapel in Haute-Amance

- Coat of arms
- Location of Haute-Amance
- Location within France Location within Grand Est
- Coordinates: 47°50′33″N 5°33′09″E
- Country: France
- Region: Grand Est
- Department: Haute-Marne
- Arrondissement: Langres
- Canton: Chalindrey
- Intercommunality: Savoir-Faire

Government
  - Mayor (2020–2026): Jean-Philippe Bianchi
- Area^{1}: 46.33 km^{2} (17.89 sq mi)
- Elevation: 300 m (980 ft)
- Population (2023): 952
  - Density: 20.5/km^{2} (53.2/sq mi)
- Demonym(s): Hortois, Hortoises
- Time zone: UTC+01:00 (CET)
  - Summer (DST): UTC+02:00 (CEST)
- INSEE/Postal code: 52242 /52600
- ^{1} French Land Register data, which excludes lakes, ponds, glaciers > 1 km^{2} (0.386 sq mi or 247 acres) and river estuaries.

Haute-Amance (French pronunciation: [ot amɑ̃s], lit. 'Upper Amance') is a commune in the Haute-Marne department in north-eastern France.

== See also ==
- Communes of the Haute-Marne department
