= Les Loges =

Les Loges is the name or part of the name of several communes in France:

- Les Loges, Calvados, in the Calvados département
- Les Loges, Haute-Marne, in the Haute-Marne département
- Les Loges, Seine-Maritime, in the Seine-Maritime département
- Les Loges-en-Josas, in the Yvelines département
- Les Loges-Marchis, in the Manche département
- Les Loges-Margueron, in the Aube département
- Les Loges-Saulces, in the Calvados département
- Les Loges-sur-Brécey, in the Manche département
