= Colmier-le-Bas =

- Commune
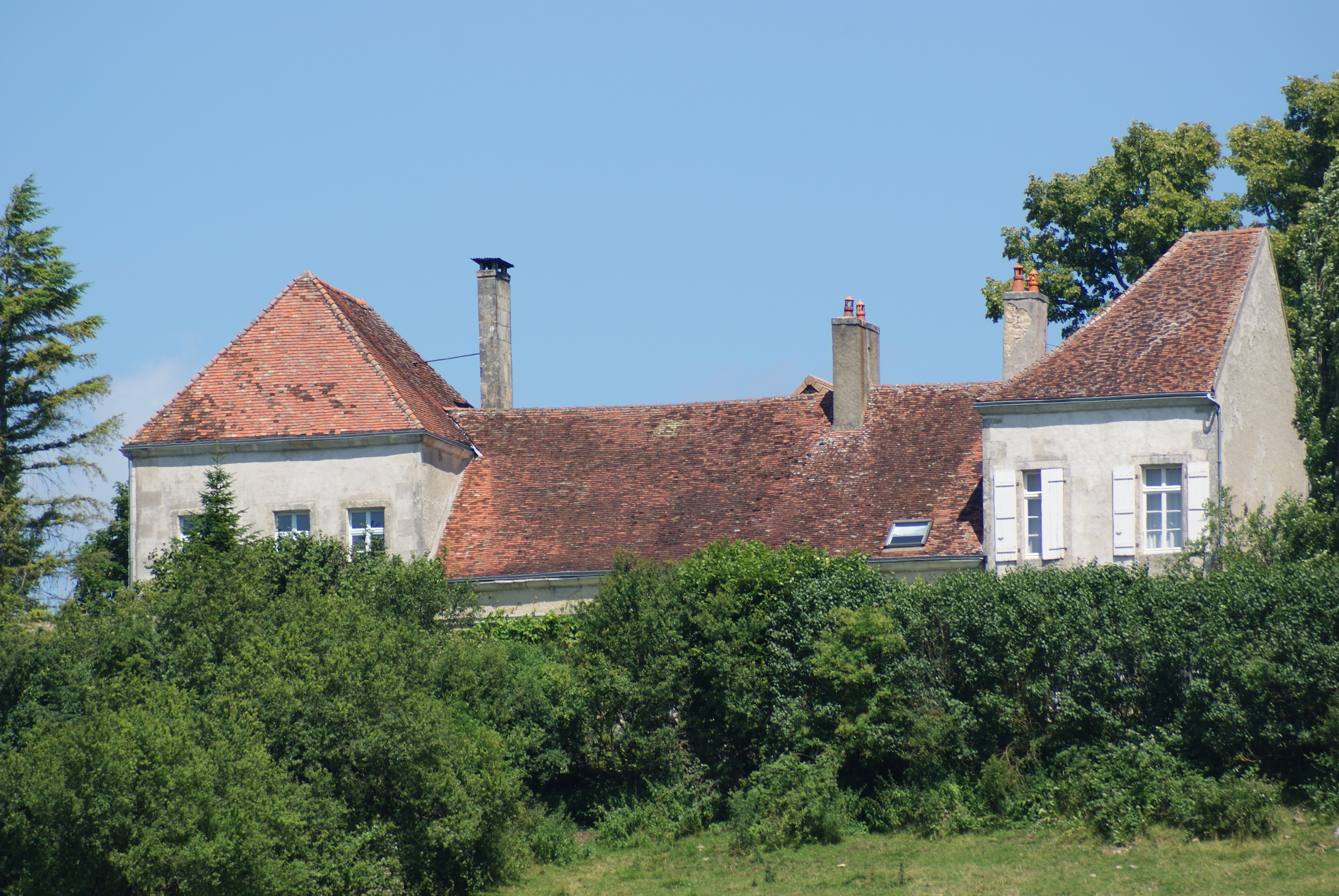
- The chateau in Colmier-le-Bas
- Location of Colmier-le-Bas
- Location within France Location within Grand Est
- Coordinates: 47°46′21″N 4°57′11″E
- Country: France
- Region: Grand Est
- Department: Haute-Marne
- Arrondissement: Langres
- Canton: Villegusien-le-Lac
- Intercommunality: Auberive Vingeanne et Montsaugeonnais

Government
  - Mayor (2020–2026): Michel Renard
- Area^{1}: 5.95 km^{2} (2.30 sq mi)
- Elevation: 402 m (1,319 ft)
- Highest elevation: 446 m (1,463 ft)
- Lowest elevation: 308 m (1,010 ft)
- Population (2023): 22
  - Density: 3.7/km^{2} (9.6/sq mi)
- Time zone: UTC+01:00 (CET)
  - Summer (DST): UTC+02:00 (CEST)
- INSEE/Postal code: 52137 /52160
- ^{1} French Land Register data, which excludes lakes, ponds, glaciers > 1 km^{2} (0.386 sq mi or 247 acres) and river estuaries.

Colmier-le-Bas (French pronunciation: [kɔlmje lə ba]) is a commune in the Haute-Marne department in north-eastern France.

== See also ==
- Communes of the Haute-Marne department
