= Arrondissement of Langres =

Coordinates: 47.87°N 5.33°E

Langres
- Arrondissement
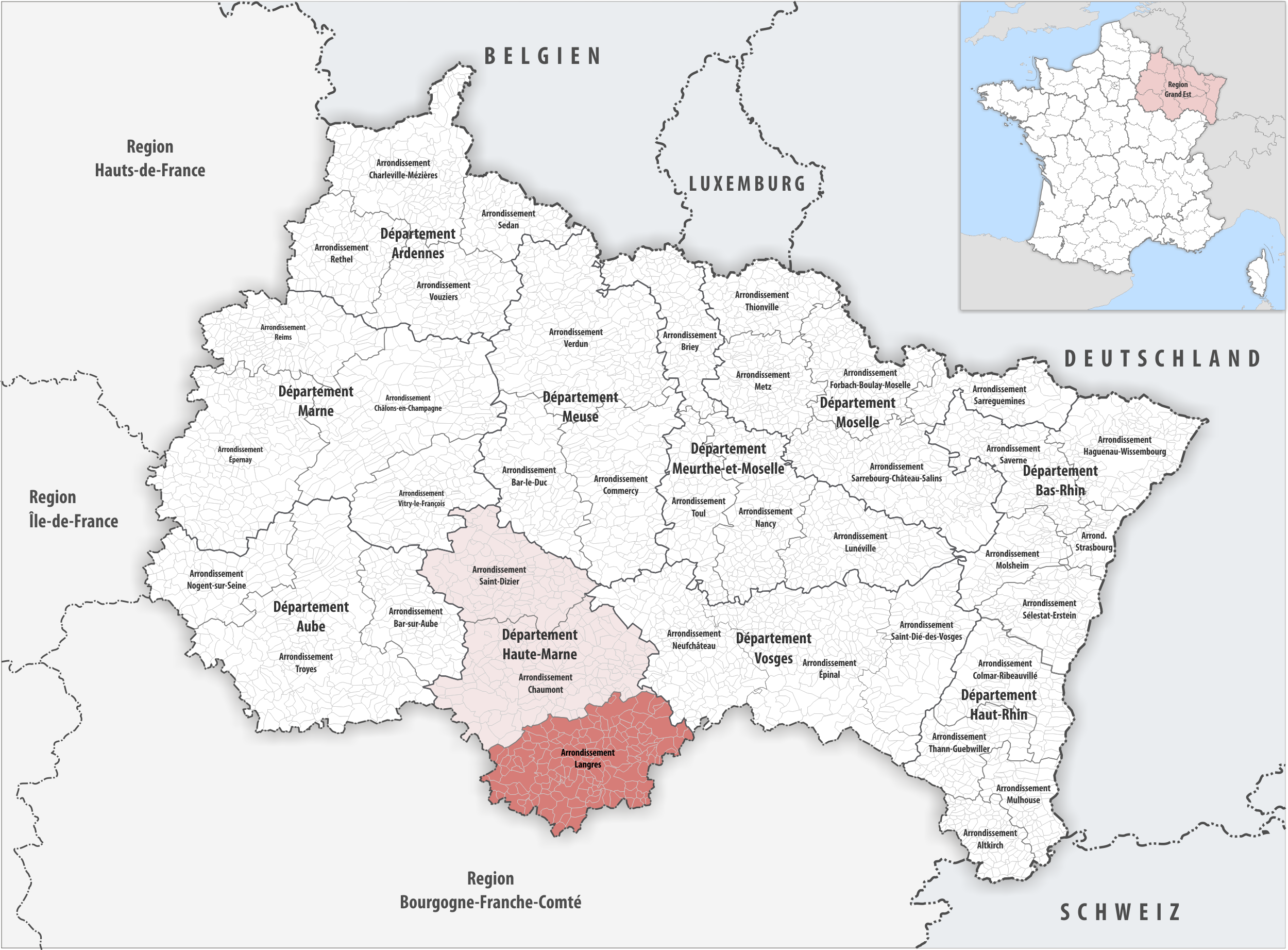
- Location within the region Grand Est
- Country: France
- Region: Grand Est
- Department: Haute-Marne
- No. of communes: {{{nbcomm}}}
- Area: 2,162.9 km^{2} (835.1 sq mi)
- Population (2023): 42,230
  - Density: 19.52/km^{2} (50.57/sq mi)
- INSEE code: 522

The arrondissement of Langres is an arrondissement of France in the Haute-Marne department in the Grand Est region. It has 157 communes. Its population is 42,678 (2021), and its area is 2,162.9 km^{2} (835.1 sq mi).

== Composition ==
The communes of the arrondissement of Langres are:

1. Aigremont
2. Andilly-en-Bassigny
3. Anrosey
4. Aprey
5. Arbigny-sous-Varennes
6. Arbot
7. Auberive
8. Aujeurres
9. Aulnoy-sur-Aube
10. Avrecourt
11. Baissey
12. Bannes
13. Bay-sur-Aube
14. Beauchemin
15. Belmont
16. Bize
17. Bonnecourt
18. Bourbonne-les-Bains
19. Bourg
20. Brennes
21. Celles-en-Bassigny
22. Celsoy
23. Chalancey
24. Chalindrey
25. Champigny-lès-Langres
26. Champigny-sous-Varennes
27. Champsevraine
28. Changey
29. Chanoy
30. Charmes
31. Chassigny
32. Le Châtelet-sur-Meuse
33. Chatenay-Mâcheron
34. Chatenay-Vaudin
35. Chaudenay
36. Chauffourt
37. Chézeaux
38. Choilley-Dardenay
39. Cohons
40. Coiffy-le-Bas
41. Coiffy-le-Haut
42. Colmier-le-Bas
43. Colmier-le-Haut
44. Coublanc
45. Courcelles-en-Montagne
46. Culmont
47. Cusey
48. Dammartin-sur-Meuse
49. Dampierre
50. Damrémont
51. Dommarien
52. Enfonvelle
53. Farincourt
54. Faverolles
55. Fayl-Billot
56. Flagey
57. Frécourt
58. Fresnes-sur-Apance
59. Genevrières
60. Germaines
61. Gilley
62. Grandchamp
63. Grenant
64. Guyonvelle
65. Haute-Amance
66. Heuilley-le-Grand
67. Humes-Jorquenay
68. Isômes
69. Laferté-sur-Amance
70. Laneuvelle
71. Langres
72. Larivière-Arnoncourt
73. Lavernoy
74. Lavilleneuve
75. Lecey
76. Leuchey
77. Les Loges
78. Longeau-Percey
79. Maâtz
80. Maizières-sur-Amance
81. Marac
82. Marcilly-en-Bassigny
83. Mardor
84. Melay
85. Montcharvot
86. Le Montsaugeonnais
87. Mouilleron
88. Neuilly-l'Évêque
89. Neuvelle-lès-Voisey
90. Noidant-Chatenoy
91. Noidant-le-Rocheux
92. Occey
93. Orbigny-au-Mont
94. Orbigny-au-Val
95. Orcevaux
96. Ormancey
97. Le Pailly
98. Palaiseul
99. Parnoy-en-Bassigny
100. Peigney
101. Perrancey-les-Vieux-Moulins
102. Perrogney-les-Fontaines
103. Pierremont-sur-Amance
104. Pisseloup
105. Plesnoy
106. Poinsenot
107. Poinson-lès-Fayl
108. Poinson-lès-Grancey
109. Poiseul
110. Praslay
111. Pressigny
112. Rançonnières
113. Rivière-les-Fosses
114. Rivières-le-Bois
115. Rochetaillée
116. Rolampont
117. Rouelles
118. Rougeux
119. Rouvres-sur-Aube
120. Saint-Broingt-le-Bois
121. Saint-Broingt-les-Fosses
122. Saint-Ciergues
123. Saint-Loup-sur-Aujon
124. Saint-Martin-lès-Langres
125. Saint-Maurice
126. Saints-Geosmes
127. Saint-Vallier-sur-Marne
128. Sarrey
129. Saulles
130. Saulxures
131. Savigny
132. Serqueux
133. Soyers
134. Ternat
135. Torcenay
136. Tornay
137. Vaillant
138. Val-de-Meuse
139. Le Val-d'Esnoms
140. Valleroy
141. Vals-des-Tilles
142. Varennes-sur-Amance
143. Vauxbons
144. Velles
145. Verseilles-le-Bas
146. Verseilles-le-Haut
147. Vesvres-sous-Chalancey
148. Vicq
149. Villars-Santenoge
150. Villegusien-le-Lac
151. Villiers-lès-Aprey
152. Violot
153. Vitry-en-Montagne
154. Vivey
155. Voisey
156. Voisines
157. Voncourt

== History ==
The arrondissement of Langres was created in 1800.

As a result of the reorganisation of the cantons of France which came into effect in 2015, the borders of the cantons are no longer related to the borders of the arrondissements. The cantons of the arrondissement of Langres were, as of January 2015:

1. Auberive
2. Bourbonne-les-Bains
3. Fayl-Billot
4. Laferté-sur-Amance
5. Langres
6. Longeau-Percey
7. Neuilly-l'Évêque
8. Prauthoy
9. Terre-Natale
10. Val-de-Meuse
