= Guyonvelle =

- Commune
- Location of Guyonvelle
- Location within France Location within Grand Est
- Coordinates: 47°51′18″N 5°42′30″E
- Country: France
- Region: Grand Est
- Department: Haute-Marne
- Arrondissement: Langres
- Canton: Chalindrey

Government
  - Mayor (2020–2026): Jean-Louis Ouzelet
- Area^{1}: 5.34 km^{2} (2.06 sq mi)
- Elevation: 370 m (1,210 ft)
- Highest elevation: 413 m (1,355 ft)
- Lowest elevation: 244 m (801 ft)
- Population (2023): 84
  - Density: 16/km^{2} (41/sq mi)
- Time zone: UTC+01:00 (CET)
  - Summer (DST): UTC+02:00 (CEST)
- INSEE/Postal code: 52233 /52400
- ^{1} French Land Register data, which excludes lakes, ponds, glaciers > 1 km^{2} (0.386 sq mi or 247 acres) and river estuaries.

Guyonvelle (French pronunciation: [ɡɥijɔ̃vɛl]) is a commune in the Haute-Marne department in north-eastern France.

== See also ==
- Communes of the Haute-Marne department
