= Ormancey =

- Commune
- Location of Ormancey
- Location within France Location within Grand Est
- Coordinates: 47°54′29″N 5°11′00″E
- Country: France
- Region: Grand Est
- Department: Haute-Marne
- Arrondissement: Langres
- Canton: Langres

Government
  - Mayor (2020–2026): David Soenen
- Area^{1}: 17.11 km^{2} (6.61 sq mi)
- Elevation: 370 m (1,210 ft)
- Highest elevation: 452 m (1,483 ft)
- Lowest elevation: 358 m (1,175 ft)
- Population (2023): 73
  - Density: 4.3/km^{2} (11/sq mi)
- Time zone: UTC+01:00 (CET)
  - Summer (DST): UTC+02:00 (CEST)
- INSEE/Postal code: 52366 /52200
- ^{1} French Land Register data, which excludes lakes, ponds, glaciers > 1 km^{2} (0.386 sq mi or 247 acres) and river estuaries.

Ormancey (French pronunciation: [ɔʁmɑ̃sɛ]) is a commune in the Haute-Marne department in north-eastern France.

== See also ==
- Communes of the Haute-Marne department
