= Genevrières =

- Commune
- Location of Genevrières
- Location within France Location within Grand Est
- Coordinates: 47°43′19″N 5°36′25″E
- Country: France
- Region: Grand Est
- Department: Haute-Marne
- Arrondissement: Langres
- Canton: Chalindrey
- Intercommunality: Savoir-Faire

Government
  - Mayor (2020–2026): Daniel Guerret
- Area^{1}: 12.95 km^{2} (5.00 sq mi)
- Elevation: 311 m (1,020 ft)
- Highest elevation: 345 m (1,132 ft)
- Lowest elevation: 265 m (869 ft)
- Population (2023): 124
  - Density: 9.58/km^{2} (24.8/sq mi)
- Time zone: UTC+01:00 (CET)
  - Summer (DST): UTC+02:00 (CEST)
- INSEE/Postal code: 52213 /52500
- ^{1} French Land Register data, which excludes lakes, ponds, glaciers > 1 km^{2} (0.386 sq mi or 247 acres) and river estuaries.

Genevrières (French pronunciation: [ʒənvʁijɛʁ]) is a commune in the Haute-Marne department in north-eastern France.

== See also ==
- Communes of the Haute-Marne department
