= Belmont, Haute-Marne =

Belmont
- Commune
- Location of Belmont
- Location within France Location within Grand Est
- Coordinates: 47°43′28″N 5°32′50″E
- Country: France
- Region: Grand Est
- Department: Haute-Marne
- Arrondissement: Langres
- Canton: Chalindrey

Government
  - Mayor (2020–2026): Michel Allix
- Area^{1}: 7.47 km^{2} (2.88 sq mi)
- Elevation: 318 m (1,043 ft)
- Highest elevation: 375 m (1,230 ft)
- Lowest elevation: 251 m (823 ft)
- Population (2023): 46
  - Density: 6.2/km^{2} (16/sq mi)
- Time zone: UTC+01:00 (CET)
  - Summer (DST): UTC+02:00 (CEST)
- INSEE/Postal code: 52043 /52500
- ^{1} French Land Register data, which excludes lakes, ponds, glaciers > 1 km^{2} (0.386 sq mi or 247 acres) and river estuaries.

Belmont (French pronunciation: [bɛlmɔ̃]) is a commune in the Haute-Marne department in northeastern France.

== Population ==
Historical population
Year	Pop.	±% p.a.
1968	95	—
1975	83	−1.91%
1982	59	−4.76%
1990	59	+0.00%
1999	47	−2.49%
2007	55	+1.98%
2012	47	−3.09%
2017	57	+3.93%
2023	46	−3.51%
Source: INSEE

== See also ==
- Communes of the Haute-Marne department
