= Saint-Broingt-le-Bois =

- Commune
- Coat of arms
- Location of Saint-Broingt-le-Bois
- Location within France Location within Grand Est
- Coordinates: 47°44′01″N 5°25′20″E
- Country: France
- Region: Grand Est
- Department: Haute-Marne
- Arrondissement: Langres
- Canton: Chalindrey

Government
  - Mayor (2020–2026): Jeremy Busolini
- Area^{1}: 4.49 km^{2} (1.73 sq mi)
- Elevation: 330 m (1,080 ft)
- Highest elevation: 372 m (1,220 ft)
- Lowest elevation: 264 m (866 ft)
- Population (2023): 72
  - Density: 16/km^{2} (42/sq mi)
- Time zone: UTC+01:00 (CET)
  - Summer (DST): UTC+02:00 (CEST)
- INSEE/Postal code: 52445 /52190
- ^{1} French Land Register data, which excludes lakes, ponds, glaciers > 1 km^{2} (0.386 sq mi or 247 acres) and river estuaries.

Saint-Broingt-le-Bois (French pronunciation: [sɛ̃ bʁwɛ̃ lə bwa]) is a commune in the Haute-Marne department in north-eastern France.

== See also ==
- Communes of the Haute-Marne department
