= Soyers =

- Commune
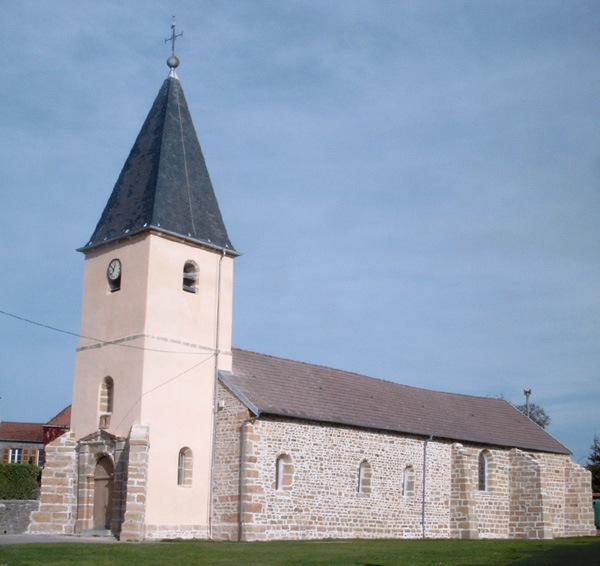
- The church in Soyers
- Location of Soyers
- Location within France Location within Grand Est
- Coordinates: 47°52′12″N 5°41′41″E
- Country: France
- Region: Grand Est
- Department: Haute-Marne
- Arrondissement: Langres
- Canton: Chalindrey

Government
  - Mayor (2020–2026): Bernard Bredelet
- Area^{1}: 6.05 km^{2} (2.34 sq mi)
- Elevation: 370 m (1,210 ft)
- Highest elevation: 423 m (1,388 ft)
- Lowest elevation: 243 m (797 ft)
- Population (2023): 63
  - Density: 10/km^{2} (27/sq mi)
- Time zone: UTC+01:00 (CET)
  - Summer (DST): UTC+02:00 (CEST)
- INSEE/Postal code: 52483 /52400
- ^{1} French Land Register data, which excludes lakes, ponds, glaciers > 1 km^{2} (0.386 sq mi or 247 acres) and river estuaries.

Soyers (French pronunciation: [swaje]) is a commune in the Haute-Marne department in north-eastern France.

== See also ==
- Communes of the Haute-Marne department
