= Laneuvelle =

- Commune
- Location of Laneuvelle
- Location within France Location within Grand Est
- Coordinates: 47°55′30″N 5°40′20″E
- Country: France
- Region: Grand Est
- Department: Haute-Marne
- Arrondissement: Langres
- Canton: Bourbonne-les-Bains
- Intercommunality: Savoir-Faire

Government
  - Mayor (2020–2026): Eric Chauvin
- Area^{1}: 11.03 km^{2} (4.26 sq mi)
- Elevation: 330 m (1,080 ft)
- Population (2023): 69
  - Density: 6.3/km^{2} (16/sq mi)
- Time zone: UTC+01:00 (CET)
  - Summer (DST): UTC+02:00 (CEST)
- INSEE/Postal code: 52264 /52400
- ^{1} French Land Register data, which excludes lakes, ponds, glaciers > 1 km^{2} (0.386 sq mi or 247 acres) and river estuaries.

Laneuvelle (French pronunciation: [lanøvɛl]) is a commune in the Haute-Marne department in north-eastern France.

== See also ==
- Communes of the Haute-Marne department
