= Palaiseul =

- Commune
- Coat of arms
- Location of Palaiseul
- Location within France Location within Grand Est
- Coordinates: 47°46′12″N 5°24′47″E
- Country: France
- Region: Grand Est
- Department: Haute-Marne
- Arrondissement: Langres
- Canton: Chalindrey

Government
  - Mayor (2020–2026): Wilfried Jourd'heuil
- Area^{1}: 4.98 km^{2} (1.92 sq mi)
- Elevation: 325 m (1,066 ft)
- Highest elevation: 353 m (1,158 ft)
- Lowest elevation: 294 m (965 ft)
- Population (2023): 52
  - Density: 10/km^{2} (27/sq mi)
- Time zone: UTC+01:00 (CET)
  - Summer (DST): UTC+02:00 (CEST)
- INSEE/Postal code: 52375 /52600
- ^{1} French Land Register data, which excludes lakes, ponds, glaciers > 1 km^{2} (0.386 sq mi or 247 acres) and river estuaries.

Palaiseul (French pronunciation: [palɛzœl]) is a commune in the Haute-Marne department in north-eastern France.

== See also ==
- Communes of the Haute-Marne department
