= Violot =

- Commune
- Coat of arms
- Location of Violot
- Location within France Location within Grand Est
- Coordinates: 47°45′52″N 5°26′30″E
- Country: France
- Region: Grand Est
- Department: Haute-Marne
- Arrondissement: Langres
- Canton: Chalindrey

Government
  - Mayor (2020–2026): Olivier Gauthier
- Area^{1}: 4.27 km^{2} (1.65 sq mi)
- Elevation: 325 m (1,066 ft)
- Highest elevation: 356 m (1,168 ft)
- Lowest elevation: 264 m (866 ft)
- Population (2023): 63
  - Density: 15/km^{2} (38/sq mi)
- Time zone: UTC+01:00 (CET)
  - Summer (DST): UTC+02:00 (CEST)
- INSEE/Postal code: 52539 /52600
- ^{1} French Land Register data, which excludes lakes, ponds, glaciers > 1 km^{2} (0.386 sq mi or 247 acres) and river estuaries.

Violot (French pronunciation: [vjɔlo]) is a commune in the Haute-Marne department in north-eastern France.

== See also ==
- Communes of the Haute-Marne department
