= Grenant =

- Commune
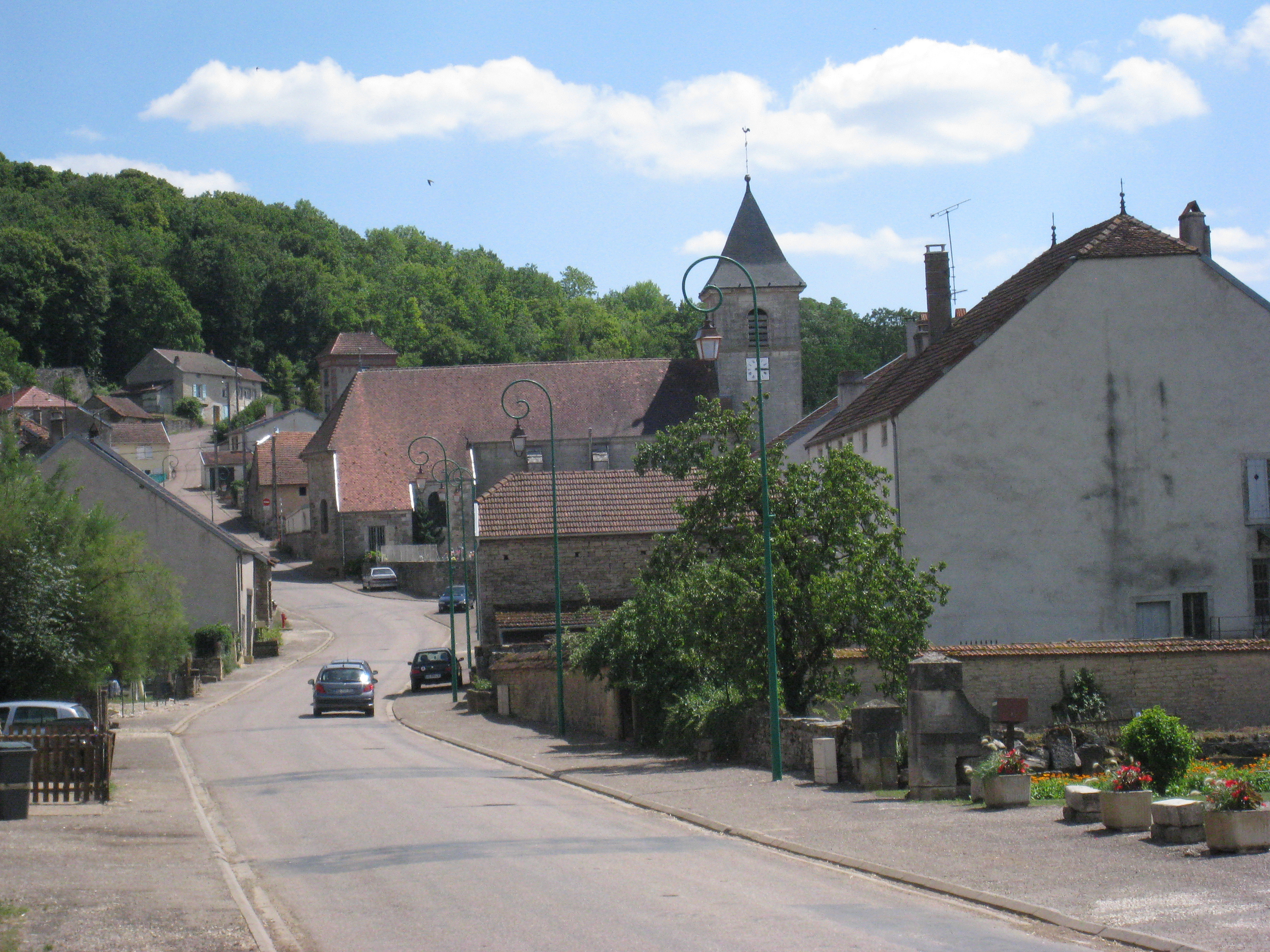
- The church and surroundings in Grenant

- Coat of arms
- Location of Grenant
- Location within France Location within Grand Est
- Coordinates: 47°42′34″N 5°30′14″E
- Country: France
- Region: Grand Est
- Department: Haute-Marne
- Arrondissement: Langres
- Canton: Chalindrey
- Intercommunality: Savoir-Faire

Government
  - Mayor (2020–2026): Christiane Semelet
- Area^{1}: 12.94 km^{2} (5.00 sq mi)
- Elevation: 258 m (846 ft)
- Highest elevation: 385 m (1,263 ft)
- Lowest elevation: 242 m (794 ft)
- Population (2023): 148
  - Density: 11.4/km^{2} (29.6/sq mi)
- Time zone: UTC+01:00 (CET)
  - Summer (DST): UTC+02:00 (CEST)
- INSEE/Postal code: 52229 /52500
- ^{1} French Land Register data, which excludes lakes, ponds, glaciers > 1 km^{2} (0.386 sq mi or 247 acres) and river estuaries.

Grenant (French pronunciation: [ɡʁənɑ̃]) is a commune in the Haute-Marne department in north-eastern France.

== See also ==
- Communes of the Haute-Marne department
