= Villars-Santenoge =

- Commune
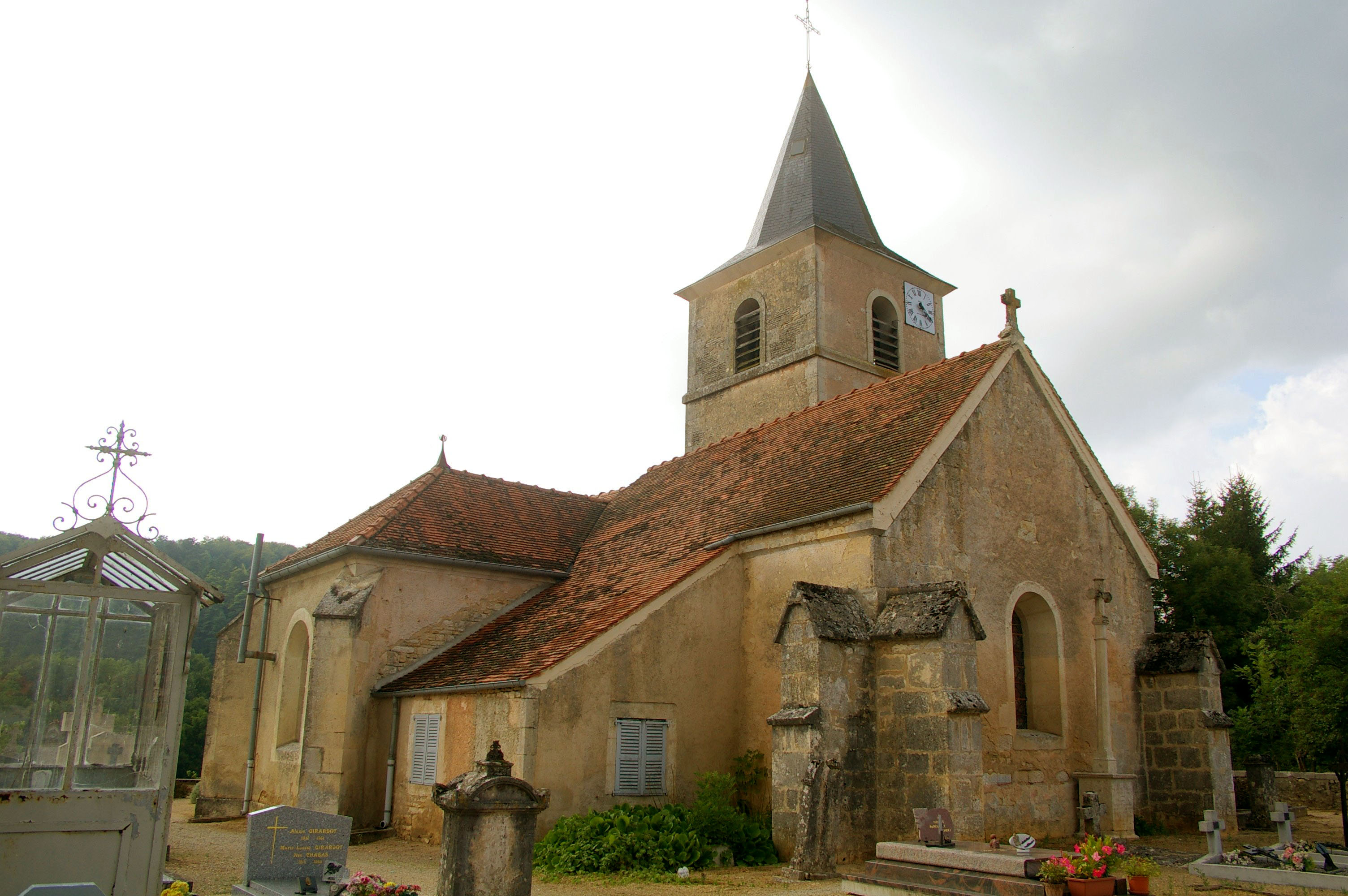
- The church in Santenoge
- Location of Villars-Santenoge
- Location within France Location within Grand Est
- Coordinates: 47°45′03″N 4°58′39″E
- Country: France
- Region: Grand Est
- Department: Haute-Marne
- Arrondissement: Langres
- Canton: Villegusien-le-Lac
- Intercommunality: Auberive Vingeanne et Montsaugeonnais

Government
  - Mayor (2020–2026): Jean-Pierre Goustiaux
- Area^{1}: 19.95 km^{2} (7.70 sq mi)
- Elevation: 374 m (1,227 ft)
- Highest elevation: 487 m (1,598 ft)
- Lowest elevation: 328 m (1,076 ft)
- Population (2023): 82
  - Density: 4.1/km^{2} (11/sq mi)
- Time zone: UTC+01:00 (CET)
  - Summer (DST): UTC+02:00 (CEST)
- INSEE/Postal code: 52526 /52160
- ^{1} French Land Register data, which excludes lakes, ponds, glaciers > 1 km^{2} (0.386 sq mi or 247 acres) and river estuaries.

Villars-Santenoge (French pronunciation: [vilaʁ sɑ̃tnɔʒ]) is a commune in the Haute-Marne department in north-eastern France. It was created in 1972 by the merger of two former communes: Santenoge and Villars-Montroyer.

== See also ==
- Communes of the Haute-Marne department
