= Grandchamp, Haute-Marne =

Grandchamp
- Commune
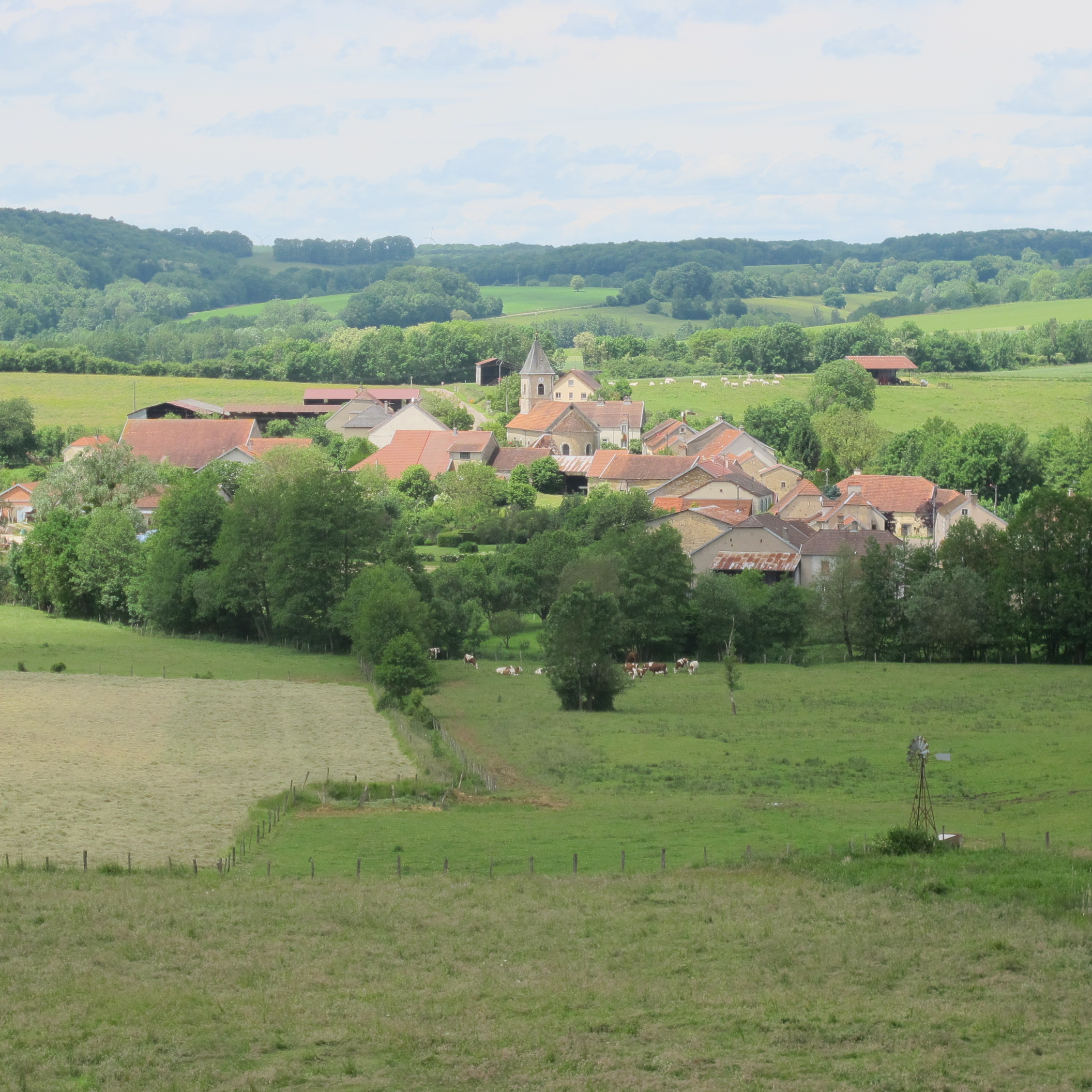
- A general view of Grandchamp
- Location of Grandchamp
- Location within France Location within Grand Est
- Coordinates: 47°43′26″N 5°27′08″E
- Country: France
- Region: Grand Est
- Department: Haute-Marne
- Arrondissement: Langres
- Canton: Chalindrey

Government
  - Mayor (2020–2026): Régis Bizingre
- Area^{1}: 4.78 km^{2} (1.85 sq mi)
- Elevation: 323 m (1,060 ft)
- Population (2023): 64
  - Density: 13/km^{2} (35/sq mi)
- Time zone: UTC+01:00 (CET)
  - Summer (DST): UTC+02:00 (CEST)
- INSEE/Postal code: 52228 /52600
- ^{1} French Land Register data, which excludes lakes, ponds, glaciers > 1 km^{2} (0.386 sq mi or 247 acres) and river estuaries.

Grandchamp French pronunciation: [ɡʁɑ̃ʃɑ̃] is a commune in the Haute-Marne department in north-eastern France.

It is located about 60 km north east of Dijon.

== See also ==
- Communes of the Haute-Marne department
