= Poinson-lès-Fayl =

- Commune
- Location of Poinson-lès-Fayl
- Location within France Location within Grand Est
- Coordinates: 47°45′14″N 5°36′54″E
- Country: France
- Region: Grand Est
- Department: Haute-Marne
- Arrondissement: Langres
- Canton: Chalindrey

Government
  - Mayor (2020–2026): Isabelle Doizenet
- Area^{1}: 12.43 km^{2} (4.80 sq mi)
- Elevation: 380 m (1,250 ft)
- Highest elevation: 362 m (1,188 ft)
- Lowest elevation: 275 m (902 ft)
- Population (2023): 199
  - Density: 16.0/km^{2} (41.5/sq mi)
- Time zone: UTC+01:00 (CET)
  - Summer (DST): UTC+02:00 (CEST)
- INSEE/Postal code: 52394 /52500
- ^{1} French Land Register data, which excludes lakes, ponds, glaciers > 1 km^{2} (0.386 sq mi or 247 acres) and river estuaries.

Poinson-lès-Fayl is a commune in the Haute-Marne department in north-eastern France.

== See also ==
- Communes of the Haute-Marne department
