= Farincourt =

- Commune
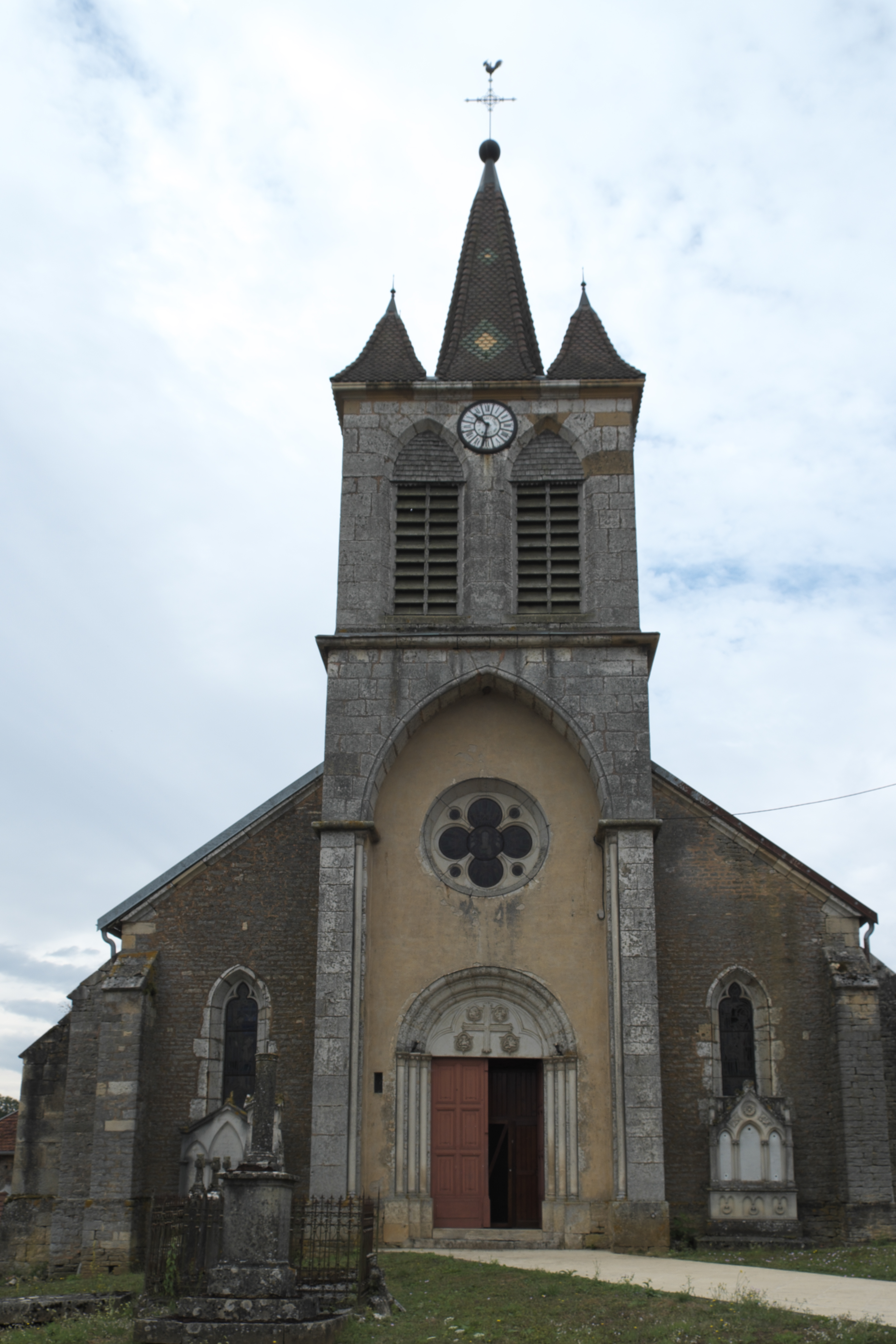
- The church in Farincourt
- Location of Farincourt
- Location within France Location within Grand Est
- Coordinates: 47°42′01″N 5°40′55″E
- Country: France
- Region: Grand Est
- Department: Haute-Marne
- Arrondissement: Langres
- Canton: Chalindrey

Government
  - Mayor (2020–2026): Antoine Vuillaume
- Area^{1}: 5.08 km^{2} (1.96 sq mi)
- Elevation: 257 m (843 ft)
- Highest elevation: 360 m (1,180 ft)
- Lowest elevation: 240 m (790 ft)
- Population (2023): 35
  - Density: 6.9/km^{2} (18/sq mi)
- Time zone: UTC+01:00 (CET)
  - Summer (DST): UTC+02:00 (CEST)
- INSEE/Postal code: 52195 /52500
- ^{1} French Land Register data, which excludes lakes, ponds, glaciers > 1 km^{2} (0.386 sq mi or 247 acres) and river estuaries.

Farincourt (French pronunciation: [faʁɛ̃kuʁ]) is a commune in the Haute-Marne department in north-eastern France.

== See also ==
- Communes of the Haute-Marne department
