= Praslay =

- Commune
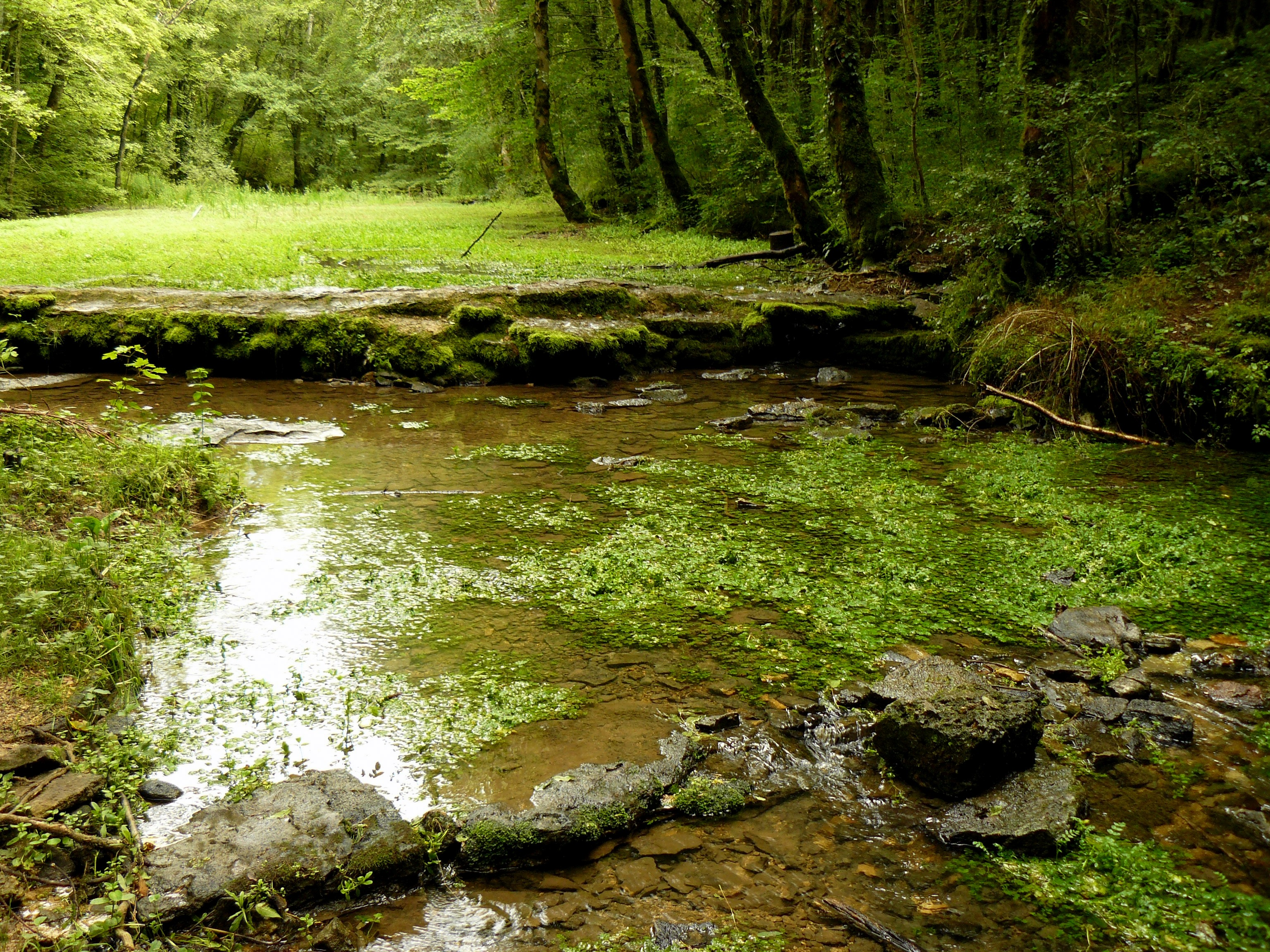
- The source of the Aube river in Praslay
- Location of Praslay
- Location within France Location within Grand Est
- Coordinates: 47°44′28″N 5°06′21″E
- Country: France
- Region: Grand Est
- Department: Haute-Marne
- Arrondissement: Langres
- Canton: Villegusien-le-Lac
- Intercommunality: Auberive Vingeanne et Montsaugeonnais

Government
  - Mayor (2020–2026): Sophie Salihi
- Area^{1}: 11.28 km^{2} (4.36 sq mi)
- Elevation: 396 m (1,299 ft)
- Highest elevation: 486 m (1,594 ft)
- Lowest elevation: 353 m (1,158 ft)
- Population (2023): 75
  - Density: 6.6/km^{2} (17/sq mi)
- Time zone: UTC+01:00 (CET)
  - Summer (DST): UTC+02:00 (CEST)
- INSEE/Postal code: 52403 /52160
- ^{1} French Land Register data, which excludes lakes, ponds, glaciers > 1 km^{2} (0.386 sq mi or 247 acres) and river estuaries.

Praslay (French pronunciation: [pʁalɛ]) is a commune in the Haute-Marne department in north-eastern France.

== See also ==
- Communes of the Haute-Marne department
