= Noidant-le-Rocheux =

- Commune
- Coat of arms
- Location of Noidant-le-Rocheux
- Location within France Location within Grand Est
- Coordinates: 47°49′49″N 5°15′18″E
- Country: France
- Region: Grand Est
- Department: Haute-Marne
- Arrondissement: Langres
- Canton: Villegusien-le-Lac
- Intercommunality: Grand Langres

Government
  - Mayor (2020–2026): Nathalie Chalus
- Area^{1}: 16.49 km^{2} (6.37 sq mi)
- Elevation: 424 m (1,391 ft)
- Highest elevation: 455 m (1,493 ft)
- Lowest elevation: 377 m (1,237 ft)
- Population (2023): 168
  - Density: 10.2/km^{2} (26.4/sq mi)
- Demonym(s): Noidantais, Noidantaises
- Time zone: UTC+01:00 (CET)
  - Summer (DST): UTC+02:00 (CEST)
- INSEE/Postal code: 52355 /52200
- ^{1} French Land Register data, which excludes lakes, ponds, glaciers > 1 km^{2} (0.386 sq mi or 247 acres) and river estuaries.

Noidant-le-Rocheux (French pronunciation: [nwadɑ̃ lə ʁɔʃø]) is a commune in the Haute-Marne department in north-eastern France.

== See also ==
- Communes of the Haute-Marne department
