= Chanoy =

- Commune
- Location of Chanoy
- Location within France Location within Grand Est
- Coordinates: 47°55′30″N 5°17′10″E
- Country: France
- Region: Grand Est
- Department: Haute-Marne
- Arrondissement: Langres
- Canton: Langres
- Intercommunality: Grand Langres

Government
  - Mayor (2020–2026): Francis Lemonnier
- Area^{1}: 2.1 km^{2} (0.81 sq mi)
- Elevation: 334 m (1,096 ft)
- Highest elevation: 428 m (1,404 ft)
- Lowest elevation: 312 m (1,024 ft)
- Population (2023): 132
  - Density: 63/km^{2} (160/sq mi)
- Demonym(s): Chanoyens, Chanoyennes
- Time zone: UTC+01:00 (CET)
  - Summer (DST): UTC+02:00 (CEST)
- INSEE/Postal code: 52106 /52260
- ^{1} French Land Register data, which excludes lakes, ponds, glaciers > 1 km^{2} (0.386 sq mi or 247 acres) and river estuaries.

Chanoy (French pronunciation: [ʃanwa]) is a commune in the Haute-Marne department in north-eastern France.

== See also ==
- Communes of the Haute-Marne department
