= Bonnecourt =

- Commune
- Location of Bonnecourt
- Location within France Location within Grand Est
- Coordinates: 47°57′12″N 5°28′33″E
- Country: France
- Region: Grand Est
- Department: Haute-Marne
- Arrondissement: Langres
- Canton: Nogent

Government
  - Mayor (2020–2026): Patricia Billard
- Area^{1}: 10.88 km^{2} (4.20 sq mi)
- Elevation: 350 m (1,150 ft)
- Highest elevation: 450 m (1,480 ft)
- Lowest elevation: 364 m (1,194 ft)
- Population (2023): 120
  - Density: 11/km^{2} (29/sq mi)
- Time zone: UTC+01:00 (CET)
  - Summer (DST): UTC+02:00 (CEST)
- INSEE/Postal code: 52059 /52360
- ^{1} French Land Register data, which excludes lakes, ponds, glaciers > 1 km^{2} (0.386 sq mi or 247 acres) and river estuaries.

Bonnecourt (French pronunciation: [bɔnkuʁ]) is a commune in the Haute-Marne department in northeastern France.

== Population ==
Historical population
Year	Pop.	±% p.a.
1968	220	—
1975	179	−2.90%
1982	145	−2.96%
1990	152	+0.59%
1999	121	−2.50%
2007	128	+0.71%
2012	128	+0.00%
2017	135	+1.07%
2023	120	−1.94%
Source: INSEE

== See also ==
- Communes of the Haute-Marne department
