= Rougeux =

- Commune
- Location of Rougeux
- Location within France Location within Grand Est
- Coordinates: 47°48′40″N 5°34′55″E
- Country: France
- Region: Grand Est
- Department: Haute-Marne
- Arrondissement: Langres
- Canton: Chalindrey
- Intercommunality: Savoir-Faire

Government
  - Mayor (2020–2026): Julien Poinsel
- Area^{1}: 9.82 km^{2} (3.79 sq mi)
- Elevation: 350 m (1,150 ft)
- Highest elevation: 368 m (1,207 ft)
- Lowest elevation: 237 m (778 ft)
- Population (2023): 116
  - Density: 11.8/km^{2} (30.6/sq mi)
- Time zone: UTC+01:00 (CET)
  - Summer (DST): UTC+02:00 (CEST)
- INSEE/Postal code: 52438 /52500
- ^{1} French Land Register data, which excludes lakes, ponds, glaciers > 1 km^{2} (0.386 sq mi or 247 acres) and river estuaries.

Rougeux (French pronunciation: [ʁuʒø]) is a commune in the Haute-Marne department in north-eastern France.

== See also ==
- Communes of the Haute-Marne department
