= Champsevraine =

- Commune
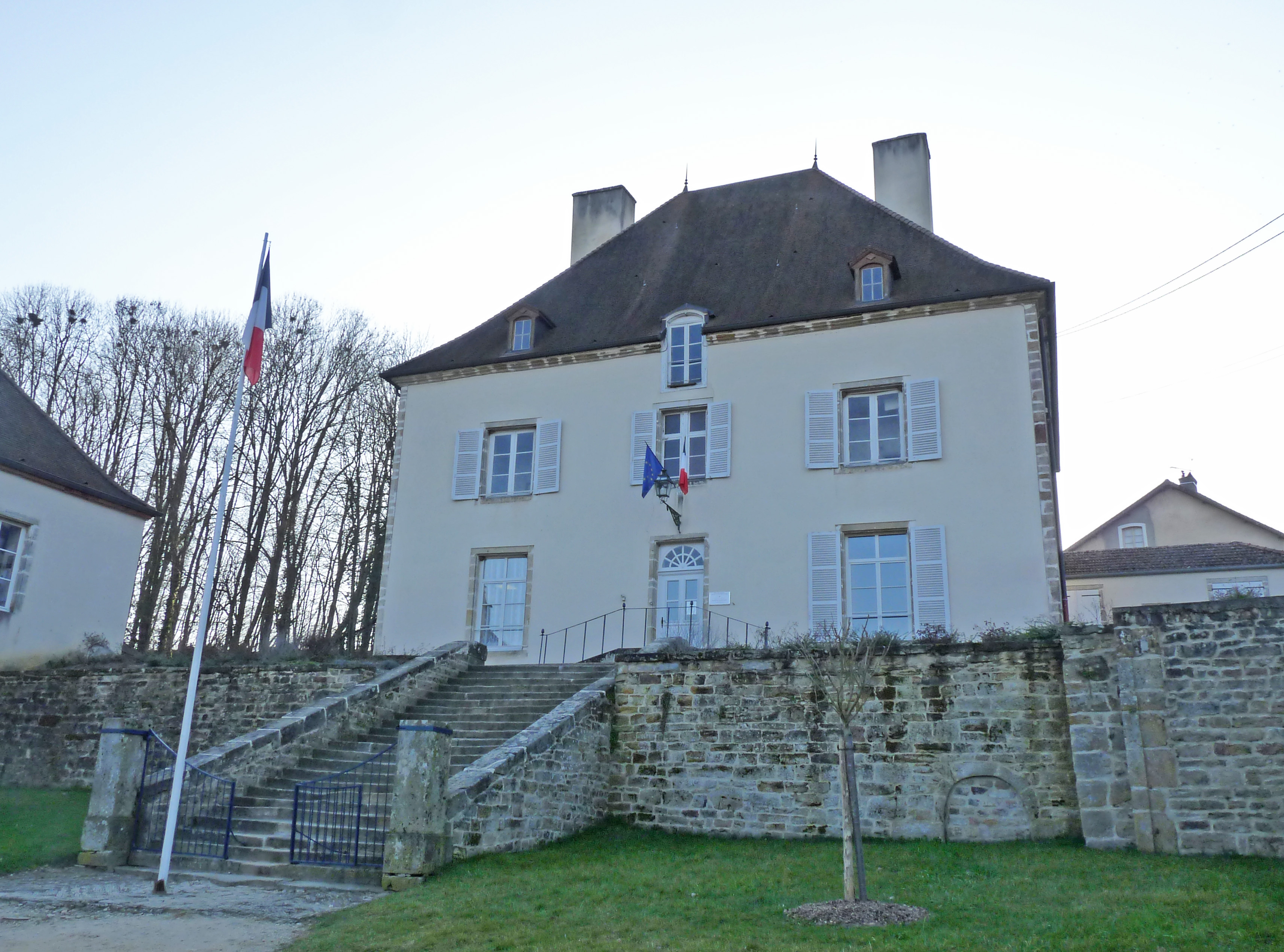
- The town hall in Champsevraine
- Location of Champsevraine
- Location within France Location within Grand Est
- Coordinates: 47°44′52″N 5°33′00″E
- Country: France
- Region: Grand Est
- Department: Haute-Marne
- Arrondissement: Langres
- Canton: Chalindrey
- Intercommunality: Savoir-Faire

Government
  - Mayor (2020–2026): Bernard Frison
- Area^{1}: 40.77 km^{2} (15.74 sq mi)
- Elevation: 280 m (920 ft)
- Highest elevation: 385 m (1,263 ft)
- Lowest elevation: 250 m (820 ft)
- Population (2023): 719
  - Density: 17.6/km^{2} (45.7/sq mi)
- Time zone: UTC+01:00 (CET)
  - Summer (DST): UTC+02:00 (CEST)
- INSEE/Postal code: 52083 /52500
- ^{1} French Land Register data, which excludes lakes, ponds, glaciers > 1 km^{2} (0.386 sq mi or 247 acres) and river estuaries.

Champsevraine (French pronunciation: [ʃɑ̃səvʁɛn]) is a commune in the Haute-Marne department in north-eastern France.

== See also ==
- Communes of the Haute-Marne department
