= Saulles =

- Commune
- Location of Saulles
- Location within France Location within Grand Est
- Coordinates: 47°42′38″N 5°31′16″E
- Country: France
- Region: Grand Est
- Department: Haute-Marne
- Arrondissement: Langres
- Canton: Chalindrey
- Intercommunality: Savoir-Faire

Government
  - Mayor (2020–2026): Ghislain de Tricornot
- Area^{1}: 17.18 km^{2} (6.63 sq mi)
- Elevation: 271 m (889 ft)
- Highest elevation: 386 m (1,266 ft)
- Lowest elevation: 247 m (810 ft)
- Population (2023): 50
  - Density: 2.9/km^{2} (7.5/sq mi)
- Time zone: UTC+01:00 (CET)
  - Summer (DST): UTC+02:00 (CEST)
- INSEE/Postal code: 52464 /52500
- ^{1} French Land Register data, which excludes lakes, ponds, glaciers > 1 km^{2} (0.386 sq mi or 247 acres) and river estuaries.

Saulles (French pronunciation: [sol]) is a commune in the Haute-Marne department in northeastern France.

== See also ==
- Communes of the Haute-Marne department
