= Anrosey =

- Commune
- Location of Anrosey
- Location within France Location within Grand Est
- Coordinates: 47°50′13″N 5°40′24″E
- Country: France
- Region: Grand Est
- Department: Haute-Marne
- Arrondissement: Langres
- Canton: Chalindrey

Government
  - Mayor (2020–2026): Corinne Becoulet
- Area^{1}: 11.04 km^{2} (4.26 sq mi)
- Elevation: 236 m (774 ft)
- Highest elevation: 369 m (1,211 ft)
- Lowest elevation: 232 m (761 ft)
- Population (2023): 121
  - Density: 11.0/km^{2} (28.4/sq mi)
- Time zone: UTC+01:00 (CET)
  - Summer (DST): UTC+02:00 (CEST)
- INSEE/Postal code: 52013 /52500
- ^{1} French Land Register data, which excludes lakes, ponds, glaciers > 1 km^{2} (0.386 sq mi or 247 acres) and river estuaries.

Anrosey (French pronunciation: [ɑ̃ʁozɛ]) is a commune in the Haute-Marne department in the Grand Est region in northeastern France.

== Population ==
Historical population
Year	Pop.	±% p.a.
1968	254	—
1975	173	−5.34%
1982	164	−0.76%
1990	153	−0.86%
1999	141	−0.90%
2007	169	+2.29%
2012	146	−2.88%
2017	121	−3.69%
2023	121	+0.00%
Source: INSEE

== See also ==
- Communes of the Haute-Marne department
