= Tornay =

- Commune
- Location of Tornay
- Location within France Location within Grand Est
- Coordinates: 47°42′04″N 5°36′25″E
- Country: France
- Region: Grand Est
- Department: Haute-Marne
- Arrondissement: Langres
- Canton: Chalindrey
- Intercommunality: Savoir-Faire

Government
  - Mayor (2020–2026): Jean Massé
- Area^{1}: 7.3 km^{2} (2.8 sq mi)
- Elevation: 380 m (1,250 ft)
- Highest elevation: 377 m (1,237 ft)
- Lowest elevation: 250 m (820 ft)
- Population (2023): 29
  - Density: 4.0/km^{2} (10/sq mi)
- Time zone: UTC+01:00 (CET)
  - Summer (DST): UTC+02:00 (CEST)
- INSEE/Postal code: 52493 /52500
- ^{1} French Land Register data, which excludes lakes, ponds, glaciers > 1 km^{2} (0.386 sq mi or 247 acres) and river estuaries.

Tornay (French pronunciation: [tɔʁnɛ]) is a commune in the Haute-Marne department in north-eastern France.

== See also ==
- Communes of the Haute-Marne department
