= Pisseloup =

- Commune
- Coat of arms
- Location of Pisseloup
- Location within France Location within Grand Est
- Coordinates: 47°49′41″N 5°44′29″E
- Country: France
- Region: Grand Est
- Department: Haute-Marne
- Arrondissement: Langres
- Canton: Chalindrey

Government
  - Mayor (2020–2026): Laurence Pertega
- Area^{1}: 3.19 km^{2} (1.23 sq mi)
- Elevation: 336 m (1,102 ft)
- Highest elevation: 356 m (1,168 ft)
- Lowest elevation: 226 m (741 ft)
- Population (2023): 62
  - Density: 19/km^{2} (50/sq mi)
- Time zone: UTC+01:00 (CET)
  - Summer (DST): UTC+02:00 (CEST)
- INSEE/Postal code: 52390 /52500
- ^{1} French Land Register data, which excludes lakes, ponds, glaciers > 1 km^{2} (0.386 sq mi or 247 acres) and river estuaries.

Pisseloup (French pronunciation: [pislu]) is a commune in the Haute-Marne department in north-eastern France.

== See also ==
- Communes of the Haute-Marne department
