= Valleroy, Haute-Marne =

Valleroy
- Commune
- Location of Valleroy
- Location within France Location within Grand Est
- Coordinates: 47°41′59″N 5°39′32″E
- Country: France
- Region: Grand Est
- Department: Haute-Marne
- Arrondissement: Langres
- Canton: Chalindrey

Government
  - Mayor (2020–2026): William Joffrain
- Area^{1}: 3.43 km^{2} (1.32 sq mi)
- Elevation: 380 m (1,250 ft)
- Highest elevation: 330 m (1,080 ft)
- Lowest elevation: 249 m (817 ft)
- Population (2023): 24
  - Density: 7.0/km^{2} (18/sq mi)
- Time zone: UTC+01:00 (CET)
  - Summer (DST): UTC+02:00 (CEST)
- INSEE/Postal code: 52503 /52500
- ^{1} French Land Register data, which excludes lakes, ponds, glaciers > 1 km^{2} (0.386 sq mi or 247 acres) and river estuaries.

Valleroy (French pronunciation: [valʁwa]) is a commune in the Haute-Marne department in north-eastern France.

== See also ==
- Communes of the Haute-Marne department
