= Gilley, Haute-Marne =

Gilley
- Commune
- Location of Gilley
- Location within France Location within Grand Est
- Coordinates: 47°41′31″N 5°38′11″E
- Country: France
- Region: Grand Est
- Department: Haute-Marne
- Arrondissement: Langres
- Canton: Chalindrey
- Intercommunality: Savoir-Faire

Government
  - Mayor (2020–2026): Daniel François
- Area^{1}: 10.58 km^{2} (4.08 sq mi)
- Highest elevation: 378 m (1,240 ft)
- Lowest elevation: 233 m (764 ft)
- Population (2023): 66
  - Density: 6.2/km^{2} (16/sq mi)
- Time zone: UTC+01:00 (CET)
  - Summer (DST): UTC+02:00 (CEST)
- INSEE/Postal code: 52223 /52500
- ^{1} French Land Register data, which excludes lakes, ponds, glaciers > 1 km^{2} (0.386 sq mi or 247 acres) and river estuaries.

Gilley (French pronunciation: [ʒilɛ]) is a commune in the Haute-Marne department in north-eastern France.

== See also ==
- Communes of the Haute-Marne department
