= Saint-Broingt-les-Fosses =

- Commune
- Location of Saint-Broingt-les-Fosses
- Location within France Location within Grand Est
- Coordinates: 47°42′51″N 5°16′25″E
- Country: France
- Region: Grand Est
- Department: Haute-Marne
- Arrondissement: Langres
- Canton: Villegusien-le-Lac

Government
  - Mayor (2020–2026): Thomas Voillequin
- Area^{1}: 12.37 km^{2} (4.78 sq mi)
- Elevation: 380 m (1,250 ft)
- Population (2023): 234
  - Density: 18.9/km^{2} (49.0/sq mi)
- Time zone: UTC+01:00 (CET)
  - Summer (DST): UTC+02:00 (CEST)
- INSEE/Postal code: 52446 /52190
- ^{1} French Land Register data, which excludes lakes, ponds, glaciers > 1 km^{2} (0.386 sq mi or 247 acres) and river estuaries.

Saint-Broingt-les-Fosses (French pronunciation: [sɛ̃ bʁwɛ̃ le fos]) is a commune in the Haute-Marne department in north-eastern France.

== See also ==
- Communes of the Haute-Marne department
