= Communes of the Haute-Marne department =

French communes' list

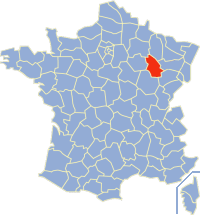

The following is a list of the 426 communes in the French department of Haute-Marne.

The communes cooperate in the following intercommunalities (as of 2025):

- Communauté d'agglomération de Chaumont
- Communauté d'agglomération Grand Saint-Dizier, Der et Vallées (partly)
- Communauté de communes d'Auberive Vingeanne et Montsaugeonnais
- Communauté de communes du Bassin de Joinville en Champagne
- Communauté de communes du Grand Langres
- Communauté de communes Meuse Rognon
- Communauté de communes de l'Ouest Vosgien (partly)
- Communauté de communes des Savoir-Faire (partly)
- Communauté de communes des Trois Forêts

INSEE	Postal	Commune
52001	52340	Ageville
52002	52400	Aigremont
52003	52700	Aillianville
52004	52230	Aingoulaincourt
52005	52120	Aizanville
52006	52130	Allichamps
52007	52110	Ambonville
52008	52700	Andelot-Blancheville
52009	52360	Andilly-en-Bassigny
52011	52310	Annéville-la-Prairie
52012	52230	Annonville
52013	52500	Anrosey
52014	52250	Aprey
52015	52500	Arbigny-sous-Varennes
52016	52160	Arbot
52017	52210	Arc-en-Barrois
52019	52110	Arnancourt
52021	52130	Attancourt
52022	52210	Aubepierre-sur-Aube
52023	52160	Auberive
52025	52240	Audeloncourt
52027	52190	Aujeurres
52028	52160	Aulnoy-sur-Aube
52029	52300	Autigny-le-Grand
52030	52300	Autigny-le-Petit
52031	52120	Autreville-sur-la-Renne
52033	52140	Avrecourt
52034	52130	Bailly-aux-Forges
52035	52250	Baissey
52037	52360	Bannes
52038	52240	Bassoncourt
52039	52110	Baudrecourt
52265	52170	Bayard-sur-Marne
52040	52160	Bay-sur-Aube
52042	52260	Beauchemin
52043	52500	Belmont
52045	52100	Bettancourt-la-Ferrée
52047	52110	Beurville
52050	52340	Biesles
52051	52500	Bize
52053	52330	Blaisy
52055	52300	Blecourt
52056	52120	Blessonville
52057	52110	Blumeray
52058	52310	Bologne
52059	52360	Bonnecourt
52060	52400	Bourbonne-les-Bains
52061	52700	Bourdons-sur-Rognon
52062	52200	Bourg
52063	52150	Bourg-Sainte-Marie
52064	52150	Bourmont-entre-Meuse-et-Mouzon
52065	52110	Bouzancourt
52066	52110	Brachay
52067	52150	Brainville-sur-Meuse
52069	52120	Braux-le-Châtel
52070	52200	Brennes
52072	52000	Brethenay
52074	52240	Breuvannes-en-Bassigny
52075	52700	Briaucourt
52076	52120	Bricon
52079	52130	Brousseval
52082	52210	Bugnières
52084	52700	Busson
52085	52240	Buxières-lès-Clefmont
52087	52000	Buxières-lès-Villiers
52088	52220	Ceffonds
52089	52360	Celles-en-Bassigny
52090	52600	Celsoy
52091	52320	Cerisières
52092	52160	Chalancey
52093	52600	Chalindrey
52095	52700	Chalvraines
52125	52000	Chamarandes-Choignes
52097	52700	Chambroncourt
52099	52410	Chamouilley
52101	52150	Champigneulles-en-Bassigny
52102	52200	Champigny-lès-Langres
52103	52400	Champigny-sous-Varennes
52083	52500	Champsevraine
52104	52100	Chancenay
52105	52360	Changey
52106	52260	Chanoy
52107	52700	Chantraines
52108	52360	Charmes
52109	52110	Charmes-en-l'Angle
52110	52110	Charmes-la-Grande
52113	52190	Chassigny
52114	52120	Châteauvillain
52400	52400	Le Châtelet-sur-Meuse
52115	52200	Chatenay-Mâcheron
52116	52360	Chatenay-Vaudin
52118	52300	Chatonrupt-Sommermont
52119	52600	Chaudenay
52120	52140	Chauffourt
52121	52000	Chaumont
52122	52150	Chaumont-la-Ville
52123	52170	Chevillon
52124	52400	Chézeaux
52126	52190	Choilley-Dardenay
52127	52240	Choiseul
52128	52700	Cirey-lès-Mareilles
52129	52110	Cirey-sur-Blaise
52130	52370	Cirfontaines-en-Azois
52131	52230	Cirfontaines-en-Ornois
52132	52240	Clefmont
52133	52700	Clinchamp
52134	52600	Cohons
52135	52400	Coiffy-le-Bas
52136	52400	Coiffy-le-Haut
52137	52160	Colmier-le-Bas
52138	52160	Colmier-le-Haut
52140	52330	Colombey-les-Deux-Églises
52141	52000	Condes
52142	52700	Consigny
52145	52500	Coublanc
52146	52210	Coupray
52147	52200	Courcelles-en-Montagne
52149	52110	Courcelles-sur-Blaise
52151	52210	Cour-l'Évêque
52155	52600	Culmont
52156	52300	Curel
52157	52330	Curmont
52158	52190	Cusey
52159	52240	Cuves
52160	52110	Daillancourt
52161	52240	Daillecourt
52162	52140	Dammartin-sur-Meuse
52163	52360	Dampierre
52164	52400	Damrémont
52165	52210	Dancevoir
52167	52700	Darmannes
52168	52120	Dinteville
52169	52130	Domblain
52170	52190	Dommarien
52171	52110	Dommartin-le-Franc
52172	52110	Dommartin-le-Saint-Père
52173	52270	Domremy-Landéville
52174	52150	Doncourt-sur-Meuse
52175	52300	Donjeux
52177	52270	Doulaincourt-Saucourt
52178	52110	Doulevant-le-Château
52179	52130	Doulevant-le-Petit
52181	52230	Échenay
52182	52290	Éclaron-Braucourt-Sainte-Livière
52183	52700	Ecot-la-Combe
52184	52300	Effincourt
52185	52400	Enfonvelle
52187	52230	Épizon
52190	52340	Esnouveaux
52193	52000	Euffigneix
52194	52410	Eurville-Bienville
52195	52500	Farincourt
52196	52260	Faverolles
52197	52500	Fayl-Billot
52198	52130	Fays
52199	52300	Ferrière-et-Lafolie
52200	52250	Flagey
52201	52110	Flammerécourt
52203	52170	Fontaines-sur-Marne
52204	52700	Forcey
52205	52800	Foulain
52206	52220	Frampas
52207	52360	Frécourt
52208	52400	Fresnes-sur-Apance
52211	52320	Froncles
52212	52300	Fronville
52213	52500	Genevrières
52214	52320	La Genevroye
52216	52160	Germaines
52217	52150	Germainvilliers
52218	52230	Germay
52219	52230	Germisay
52220	52210	Giey-sur-Aujon
52221	52330	Gillancourt
52222	52230	Gillaumé
52223	52500	Gilley
52227	52150	Graffigny-Chemin
52228	52600	Grandchamp
52229	52500	Grenant
52230	52320	Gudmont-Villiers
52231	52300	Guindrecourt-aux-Ormes
52232	52330	Guindrecourt-sur-Blaise
52233	52400	Guyonvelle
52234	52150	Hâcourt
52235	52100	Hallignicourt
52237	52150	Harréville-les-Chanteurs
52242	52600	Haute-Amance
52240	52600	Heuilley-le-Grand
52243	52150	Huilliécourt
52244	52290	Humbécourt
52245	52700	Humberville
52246	52200	Humes-Jorquenay
52247	52150	Illoud
52248	52140	Is-en-Bassigny
52249	52190	Isômes
52250	52300	Joinville
52251	52000	Jonchery
52253	52330	Juzennecourt
52254	52330	Lachapelle-en-Blaisy
52256	52700	Lafauche
52257	52500	Laferté-sur-Amance
52258	52120	Laferté-sur-Aube
52260	52310	Lamancine
52264	52400	Laneuvelle
52266	52220	Laneuville-à-Rémy
52267	52100	Laneuville-au-Pont
52269	52200	Langres
52271	52800	Lanques-sur-Rognon
52272	52120	Lanty-sur-Aube
52273	52400	Larivière-Arnoncourt
52274	52120	Latrecey-Ormoy-sur-Aube
52275	52140	Lavernoy
52276	52000	Laville-aux-Bois
52277	52140	Lavilleneuve
52278	52330	Lavilleneuve-au-Roi

INSEE	Postal	Commune
52280	52360	Lecey
52282	52210	Leffonds
52284	52110	Leschères-sur-le-Blaiseron
52285	52190	Leuchey
52286	52700	Leurville
52287	52150	Levécourt
52288	52230	Lezéville
52289	52700	Liffol-le-Petit
52290	52500	Les Loges
52291	52240	Longchamp
52292	52250	Longeau-Percey
52294	52130	Louvemont
52295	52800	Louvières
52297	52000	Luzy-sur-Marne
52298	52500	Maâtz
52300	52130	Magneux
52301	52240	Maisoncelles
52302	52300	Maizières
52303	52500	Maizières-sur-Amance
52304	52150	Malaincourt-sur-Meuse
52305	52800	Mandres-la-Côte
52306	52700	Manois
52307	52260	Marac
52308	52370	Maranville
52310	52320	Marbéville
52311	52360	Marcilly-en-Bassigny
52312	52200	Mardor
52313	52700	Mareilles
52315	52800	Marnay-sur-Marne
52316	52300	Mathons
52318	52400	Melay
52319	52240	Mennouveaux
52320	52240	Merrey
52321	52110	Mertrud
52322	52310	Meures
52325	52240	Millières
52326	52320	Mirbel
52327	52100	Moëslains
52328	52400	Montcharvot
52330	52330	Montheries
52335	52700	Montot-sur-Rognon
52336	52130	Montreuil-sur-Blaise
52337	52230	Montreuil-sur-Thonnance
52405	52190	Le Montsaugeonnais
52341	52110	Morancourt
52342	52700	Morionvilliers
52344	52160	Mouilleron
52346	52300	Mussey-sur-Marne
52347	52170	Narcy
52348	52360	Neuilly-l'Évêque
52349	52000	Neuilly-sur-Suize
52350	52400	Neuvelle-lès-Voisey
52352	52800	Ninville
52353	52800	Nogent
52354	52600	Noidant-Chatenoy
52355	52200	Noidant-le-Rocheux
52356	52300	Nomécourt
52357	52230	Noncourt-sur-le-Rongeant
52358	52240	Noyers
52359	52110	Nully
52360	52190	Occey
52362	52360	Orbigny-au-Mont
52363	52360	Orbigny-au-Val
52364	52250	Orcevaux
52365	52120	Orges
52366	52200	Ormancey
52367	52310	Ormoy-lès-Sexfontaines
52369	52700	Orquevaux
52370	52300	Osne-le-Val
52371	52310	Oudincourt
52372	52150	Outremécourt
52373	52700	Ozières
52374	52600	Le Pailly
52375	52600	Palaiseul
52376	52230	Pansey
52377	52400	Parnoy-en-Bassigny
52378	52300	Paroy-sur-Saulx
52380	52200	Peigney
52383	52200	Perrancey-les-Vieux-Moulins
52384	52160	Perrogney-les-Fontaines
52385	52240	Perrusse
52386	52100	Perthes
52388	52500	Pierremont-sur-Amance
52390	52500	Pisseloup
52391	52220	Planrupt
52392	52360	Plesnoy
52393	52160	Poinsenot
52394	52500	Poinson-lès-Fayl
52395	52160	Poinson-lès-Grancey
52396	52800	Poinson-lès-Nogent
52397	52360	Poiseul
52398	52230	Poissons
52399	52120	Pont-la-Ville
52331	52220	La Porte du Der
52401	52800	Poulangy
52403	52160	Praslay
52406	52500	Pressigny
52407	52700	Prez-sous-Lafauche
52414	52170	Rachecourt-sur-Marne
52413	52130	Rachecourt-Suzémont
52415	52140	Rançonnières
52416	52140	Rangecourt
52419	52370	Rennepont
52420	52700	Reynel
52421	52000	Riaucourt
52422	52120	Richebourg
52423	52700	Rimaucourt
52411	52220	Rives-Dervoises
52425	52190	Rivière-les-Fosses
52424	52600	Rivières-le-Bois
52426	52330	Rizaucourt-Buchey
52428	52700	Rochefort-sur-la-Côte
52044	52270	Roches-Bettaincourt
52429	52410	Roches-sur-Marne
52431	52210	Rochetaillée
52432	52260	Rolampont
52433	52150	Romain-sur-Meuse
52436	52320	Rouécourt
52437	52160	Rouelles
52438	52500	Rougeux
52439	52160	Rouvres-sur-Aube
52440	52300	Rouvroy-sur-Marne
52442	52300	Rupt
52443	52230	Sailly
52444	52700	Saint-Blin
52445	52190	Saint-Broingt-le-Bois
52446	52190	Saint-Broingt-les-Fosses
52447	52200	Saint-Ciergues
52448	52100	Saint-Dizier
52450	52210	Saint-Loup-sur-Aujon
52452	52200	Saint-Martin-lès-Langres
52453	52200	Saint-Maurice
52449	52200	Saints-Geosmes
52455	52150	Saint-Thiébault
52456	52300	Saint-Urbain-Maconcourt
52457	52200	Saint-Vallier-sur-Marne
52459	52800	Sarcey
52461	52140	Sarrey
52463	52230	Saudron
52464	52500	Saulles
52465	52140	Saulxures
52467	52500	Savigny
52468	52700	Semilly
52469	52000	Semoutiers-Montsaon
52470	52400	Serqueux
52472	52330	Sexfontaines
52473	52700	Signéville
52474	52120	Silvarouvres
52475	52130	Sommancourt
52476	52150	Sommerécourt
52479	52220	Sommevoire
52480	52320	Soncourt-sur-Marne
52482	52150	Soulaucourt-sur-Mouzon
52483	52400	Soyers
52484	52300	Suzannecourt
52486	52210	Ternat
52487	52220	Thilleux
52488	52800	Thivet
52489	52240	Thol-lès-Millières
52490	52300	Thonnance-lès-Joinville
52491	52230	Thonnance-les-Moulins
52492	52600	Torcenay
52493	52500	Tornay
52494	52000	Treix
52495	52210	Trémilly
52497	52130	Troisfontaines-la-Ville
52499	52160	Vaillant
52500	52100	Valcourt
52332	52140	Val-de-Meuse
52189	52190	Le Val-d'Esnoms
52502	52130	Valleret
52503	52500	Valleroy
52094	52160	Vals-des-Tilles
52504	52400	Varennes-sur-Amance
52505	52150	Vaudrecourt
52506	52330	Vaudrémont
52507	52200	Vauxbons
52510	52130	Vaux-sur-Blaise
52511	52300	Vaux-sur-Saint-Urbain
52512	52300	Vecqueville
52513	52500	Velles
52514	52000	Verbiesles
52515	52250	Verseilles-le-Bas
52516	52250	Verseilles-le-Haut
52517	52700	Vesaignes-sous-Lafauche
52518	52800	Vesaignes-sur-Marne
52519	52190	Vesvres-sous-Chalancey
52520	52400	Vicq
52522	52310	Viéville
52523	52700	Vignes-la-Côte
52524	52320	Vignory
52525	52120	Villars-en-Azois
52526	52160	Villars-Santenoge
52528	52130	Ville-en-Blaisois
52529	52190	Villegusien-le-Lac
52534	52100	Villiers-en-Lieu
52536	52190	Villiers-lès-Aprey
52535	52000	Villiers-le-Sec
52538	52210	Villiers-sur-Suize
52539	52600	Violot
52540	52160	Vitry-en-Montagne
52541	52800	Vitry-lès-Nogent
52542	52160	Vivey
52543	52130	Voillecomte
52544	52400	Voisey
52545	52200	Voisines
52546	52500	Voncourt
52547	52320	Vouécourt
52548	52310	Vraincourt
52549	52240	Vroncourt-la-Côte
52550	52130	Wassy
