= Rançonnières =

- Commune
- Location of Rançonnières
- Location within France Location within Grand Est
- Coordinates: 47°56′13″N 5°33′33″E
- Country: France
- Region: Grand Est
- Department: Haute-Marne
- Arrondissement: Langres
- Canton: Bourbonne-les-Bains
- Intercommunality: Grand Langres

Government
  - Mayor (2020–2026): Sylviane Denis
- Area^{1}: 8.35 km^{2} (3.22 sq mi)
- Elevation: 377 m (1,237 ft)
- Population (2023): 127
  - Density: 15.2/km^{2} (39.4/sq mi)
- Demonym(s): Rancenais, Rancenaises
- Time zone: UTC+01:00 (CET)
  - Summer (DST): UTC+02:00 (CEST)
- INSEE/Postal code: 52415 /52140
- ^{1} French Land Register data, which excludes lakes, ponds, glaciers > 1 km^{2} (0.386 sq mi or 247 acres) and river estuaries.

Rançonnières (French pronunciation: [ʁɑ̃sɔnjɛʁ]) is a commune in the Haute-Marne department in north-eastern France.

== See also ==
- Communes of the Haute-Marne department
