= Voncourt =

- Commune
- Location of Voncourt
- Location within France Location within Grand Est
- Coordinates: 47°42′55″N 5°40′23″E
- Country: France
- Region: Grand Est
- Department: Haute-Marne
- Arrondissement: Langres
- Canton: Chalindrey
- Intercommunality: Savoir-Faire

Government
  - Mayor (2020–2026): Romain Souchard
- Area^{1}: 3.5 km^{2} (1.4 sq mi)
- Elevation: 380 m (1,250 ft)
- Highest elevation: 342 m (1,122 ft)
- Lowest elevation: 257 m (843 ft)
- Population (2023): 17
  - Density: 4.9/km^{2} (13/sq mi)
- Time zone: UTC+01:00 (CET)
  - Summer (DST): UTC+02:00 (CEST)
- INSEE/Postal code: 52546 /52500
- ^{1} French Land Register data, which excludes lakes, ponds, glaciers > 1 km^{2} (0.386 sq mi or 247 acres) and river estuaries.

Voncourt (French pronunciation: [vɔ̃kuʁ]) is a commune in the Haute-Marne department in north-eastern France.

== See also ==
- Communes of the Haute-Marne department
