= Heuilley-le-Grand =

- Commune
- Location of Heuilley-le-Grand
- Location within France Location within Grand Est
- Coordinates: 47°45′18″N 5°23′32″E
- Country: France
- Region: Grand Est
- Department: Haute-Marne
- Arrondissement: Langres
- Canton: Chalindrey

Government
  - Mayor (2020–2026): Michel Gérard
- Area^{1}: 12.22 km^{2} (4.72 sq mi)
- Elevation: 325 m (1,066 ft)
- Highest elevation: 355 m (1,165 ft)
- Lowest elevation: 288 m (945 ft)
- Population (2023): 188
  - Density: 15.4/km^{2} (39.8/sq mi)
- Time zone: UTC+01:00 (CET)
  - Summer (DST): UTC+02:00 (CEST)
- INSEE/Postal code: 52240 /52600
- ^{1} French Land Register data, which excludes lakes, ponds, glaciers > 1 km^{2} (0.386 sq mi or 247 acres) and river estuaries.

Heuilley-le-Grand (French pronunciation: [œjɛ lə ɡʁɑ̃]) is a commune in the Haute-Marne department in north-eastern France.

== See also ==
- Communes of the Haute-Marne department
