= Canton of Chalindrey =

Coordinates: 47.80°N 5.43°E

The canton of Chalindrey is an administrative division of the Haute-Marne department, northeastern France. It was created at the French canton reorganisation which came into effect in March 2015. Its seat is in Chalindrey.

It consists of the following communes:

1. Anrosey
2. Arbigny-sous-Varennes
3. Belmont
4. Bize
5. Champsevraine
6. Celsoy
7. Chalindrey
8. Champigny-sous-Varennes
9. Chaudenay
10. Chézeaux
11. Coiffy-le-Bas
12. Culmont
13. Farincourt
14. Fayl-Billot
15. Genevrières
16. Gilley
17. Grandchamp
18. Grenant
19. Guyonvelle
20. Haute-Amance
21. Heuilley-le-Grand
22. Laferté-sur-Amance
23. Les Loges
24. Maizières-sur-Amance
25. Noidant-Chatenoy
26. Le Pailly
27. Palaiseul
28. Pierremont-sur-Amance
29. Pisseloup
30. Poinson-lès-Fayl
31. Pressigny
32. Rivières-le-Bois
33. Rougeux
34. Saint-Broingt-le-Bois
35. Saint-Vallier-sur-Marne
36. Saulles
37. Savigny
38. Soyers
39. Torcenay
40. Tornay
41. Valleroy
42. Varennes-sur-Amance
43. Velles
44. Violot
45. Voncourt
