= Chaudenay, Haute-Marne =

Chaudenay
- Commune
- Coat of arms
- Location of Chaudenay
- Location within France Location within Grand Est
- Coordinates: 47°49′29″N 5°30′07″E
- Country: France
- Region: Grand Est
- Department: Haute-Marne
- Arrondissement: Langres
- Canton: Chalindrey

Government
  - Mayor (2020–2026): Christophe Bourgeois
- Area^{1}: 4.6 km^{2} (1.8 sq mi)
- Elevation: 310 m (1,020 ft)
- Highest elevation: 393 m (1,289 ft)
- Lowest elevation: 276 m (906 ft)
- Population (2023): 338
  - Density: 73/km^{2} (190/sq mi)
- Time zone: UTC+01:00 (CET)
  - Summer (DST): UTC+02:00 (CEST)
- INSEE/Postal code: 52119 /52600
- ^{1} French Land Register data, which excludes lakes, ponds, glaciers > 1 km^{2} (0.386 sq mi or 247 acres) and river estuaries.

Chaudenay (French pronunciation: [ʃodnɛ]) is a commune in the Haute-Marne department in north-eastern France.

== See also ==
- Communes of the Haute-Marne department
