= Saint-Vallier-sur-Marne =

- Commune
- Location of Saint-Vallier-sur-Marne
- Location within France Location within Grand Est
- Coordinates: 47°50′13″N 5°23′41″E
- Country: France
- Region: Grand Est
- Department: Haute-Marne
- Arrondissement: Langres
- Canton: Chalindrey

Government
  - Mayor (2020–2026): Bruno Miquée
- Area^{1}: 6.64 km^{2} (2.56 sq mi)
- Elevation: 395 m (1,296 ft)
- Highest elevation: 428 m (1,404 ft)
- Lowest elevation: 343 m (1,125 ft)
- Population (2023): 173
  - Density: 26.1/km^{2} (67.5/sq mi)
- Time zone: UTC+01:00 (CET)
  - Summer (DST): UTC+02:00 (CEST)
- INSEE/Postal code: 52457 /52200
- ^{1} French Land Register data, which excludes lakes, ponds, glaciers > 1 km^{2} (0.386 sq mi or 247 acres) and river estuaries.

Saint-Vallier-sur-Marne (French pronunciation: [sɛ̃ valje syʁ maʁn], literally Saint-Vallier on Marne) is a commune in the Haute-Marne department in north-eastern France. Situated approximately 5 kilometers from the town of Langres, it lies within a meander of the Marne River, offering picturesque landscapes characteristic of the region.

== History ==
Saint-Vallier-sur-Marne was fortified with a castle; however, it suffered devastation during the wars of the 15th century and was later occupied by Austrian forces in 1814.

== See also ==
- Communes of the Haute-Marne department
