= Brennes =

- Commune
- Location of Brennes
- Location within France Location within Grand Est
- Coordinates: 47°47′50″N 5°16′49″E
- Country: France
- Region: Grand Est
- Department: Haute-Marne
- Arrondissement: Langres
- Canton: Villegusien-le-Lac

Government
  - Mayor (2020–2026): Samuel Lenoir
- Area^{1}: 9.88 km^{2} (3.81 sq mi)
- Elevation: 420 m (1,380 ft)
- Highest elevation: 462 m (1,516 ft)
- Lowest elevation: 329 m (1,079 ft)
- Population (2023): 129
  - Density: 13.1/km^{2} (33.8/sq mi)
- Time zone: UTC+01:00 (CET)
  - Summer (DST): UTC+02:00 (CEST)
- INSEE/Postal code: 52070 /52200
- ^{1} French Land Register data, which excludes lakes, ponds, glaciers > 1 km^{2} (0.386 sq mi or 247 acres) and river estuaries.

Brennes (French pronunciation: [bʁɛn]) is a commune in the Haute-Marne department in northeastern France.

== Population ==
Historical population
Year	Pop.	±% p.a.
1968	119	—
1975	145	+2.86%
1982	131	−1.44%
1990	137	+0.56%
1999	149	+0.94%
2007	125	−2.17%
2012	132	+1.10%
2017	133	+0.15%
2023	129	−0.51%
Source: INSEE

Inhabitants of Brennes are known as Brennois and Brennoises in French.

== See also ==
- Communes of the Haute-Marne department
