= Colmier-le-Haut =

- Commune
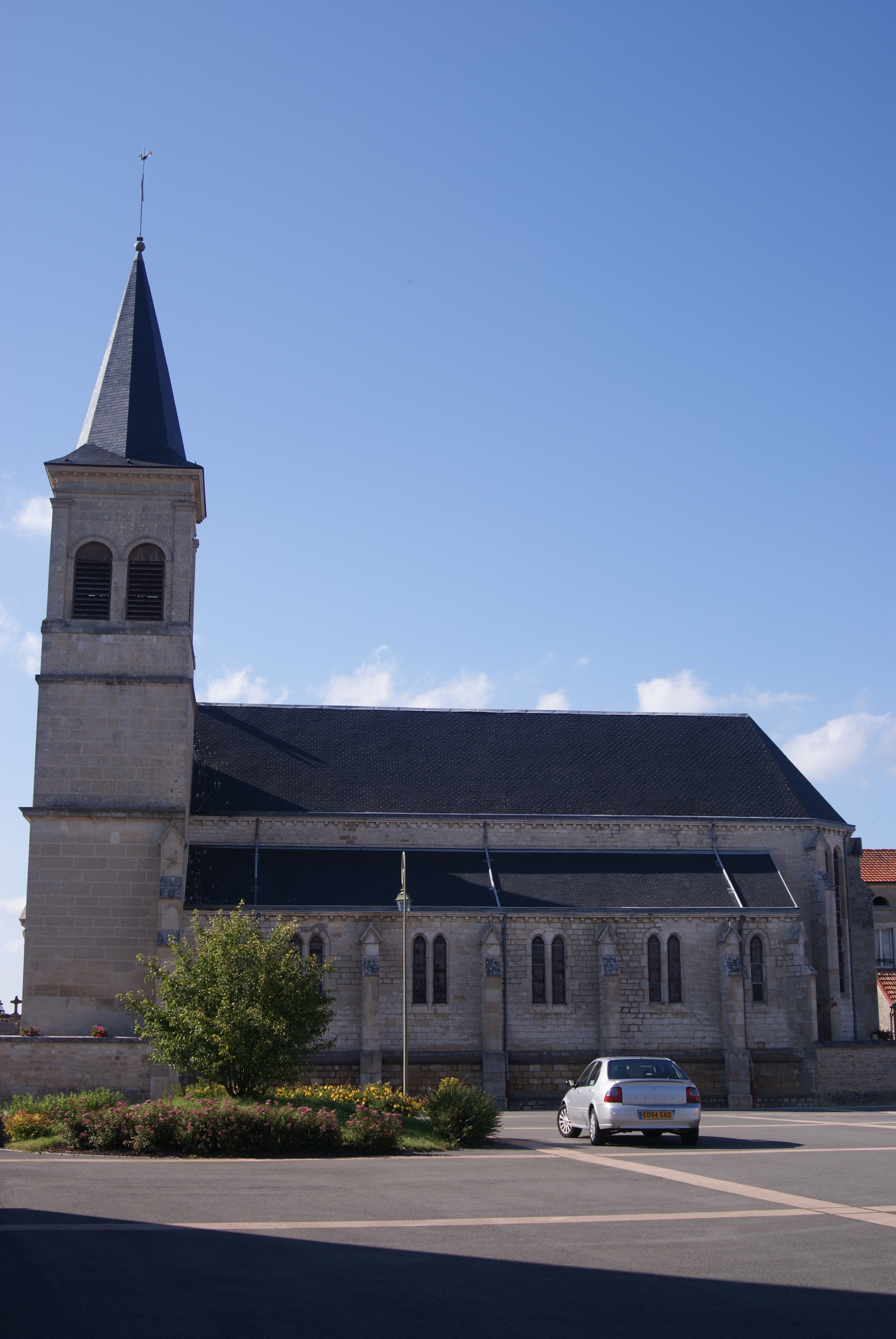
- The church in Colmier-le-Haut
- Location of Colmier-le-Haut
- Location within France Location within Grand Est
- Coordinates: 47°46′54″N 4°58′00″E
- Country: France
- Region: Grand Est
- Department: Haute-Marne
- Arrondissement: Langres
- Canton: Villegusien-le-Lac
- Intercommunality: Auberive Vingeanne et Montsaugeonnais

Government
  - Mayor (2020–2026): Eric Triboulet
- Area^{1}: 19.35 km^{2} (7.47 sq mi)
- Elevation: 420 m (1,380 ft)
- Highest elevation: 462 m (1,516 ft)
- Lowest elevation: 327 m (1,073 ft)
- Population (2023): 61
  - Density: 3.2/km^{2} (8.2/sq mi)
- Time zone: UTC+01:00 (CET)
  - Summer (DST): UTC+02:00 (CEST)
- INSEE/Postal code: 52138 /52160
- ^{1} French Land Register data, which excludes lakes, ponds, glaciers > 1 km^{2} (0.386 sq mi or 247 acres) and river estuaries.

Colmier-le-Haut (French pronunciation: [kɔlmje lə o]) is a commune in the Haute-Marne department in north-eastern France.

== See also ==
- Communes of the Haute-Marne department
