= Arbigny-sous-Varennes =

- Commune
- Location of Arbigny-sous-Varennes
- Location within France Location within Grand Est
- Coordinates: 47°51′35″N 5°36′48″E
- Country: France
- Region: Grand Est
- Department: Haute-Marne
- Arrondissement: Langres
- Canton: Chalindrey

Government
  - Mayor (2020–2026): Fabrice Goncalves
- Area^{1}: 9.84 km^{2} (3.80 sq mi)
- Elevation: 250 m (820 ft)
- Population (2023): 87
  - Density: 8.8/km^{2} (23/sq mi)
- Time zone: UTC+01:00 (CET)
  - Summer (DST): UTC+02:00 (CEST)
- INSEE/Postal code: 52015 /52500
- ^{1} French Land Register data, which excludes lakes, ponds, glaciers > 1 km^{2} (0.386 sq mi or 247 acres) and river estuaries.

Arbigny-sous-Varennes (French pronunciation: [aʁbiɲi su vaʁɛn], literally Arbigny under Varennes) is a commune in the Haute-Marne department in the Grand Est region in northeastern France.

== Population ==
Historical population
Year	Pop.	±% p.a.
1968	153	—
1975	126	−2.74%
1982	122	−0.46%
1990	121	−0.10%
1999	99	−2.21%
2007	86	−1.74%
2012	89	+0.69%
2017	89	+0.00%
2023	87	−0.38%
Source: INSEE

== See also ==
- Communes of the Haute-Marne department
