= Montcharvot =

- Commune
- Location of Montcharvot
- Location within France Location within Grand Est
- Coordinates: 47°54′08″N 5°43′52″E
- Country: France
- Region: Grand Est
- Department: Haute-Marne
- Arrondissement: Langres
- Canton: Bourbonne-les-Bains

Government
  - Mayor (2020–2026): Didier Millard
- Area^{1}: 3.52 km^{2} (1.36 sq mi)
- Elevation: 420 m (1,380 ft)
- Population (2023): 44
  - Density: 13/km^{2} (32/sq mi)
- Time zone: UTC+01:00 (CET)
  - Summer (DST): UTC+02:00 (CEST)
- INSEE/Postal code: 52328 /52400
- ^{1} French Land Register data, which excludes lakes, ponds, glaciers > 1 km^{2} (0.386 sq mi or 247 acres) and river estuaries.

Montcharvot (French pronunciation: [mɔ̃ʃaʁvo]) is a commune in the Haute-Marne department in north-eastern France.

== See also ==
- Communes of the Haute-Marne department
