= Germaines =

- Commune
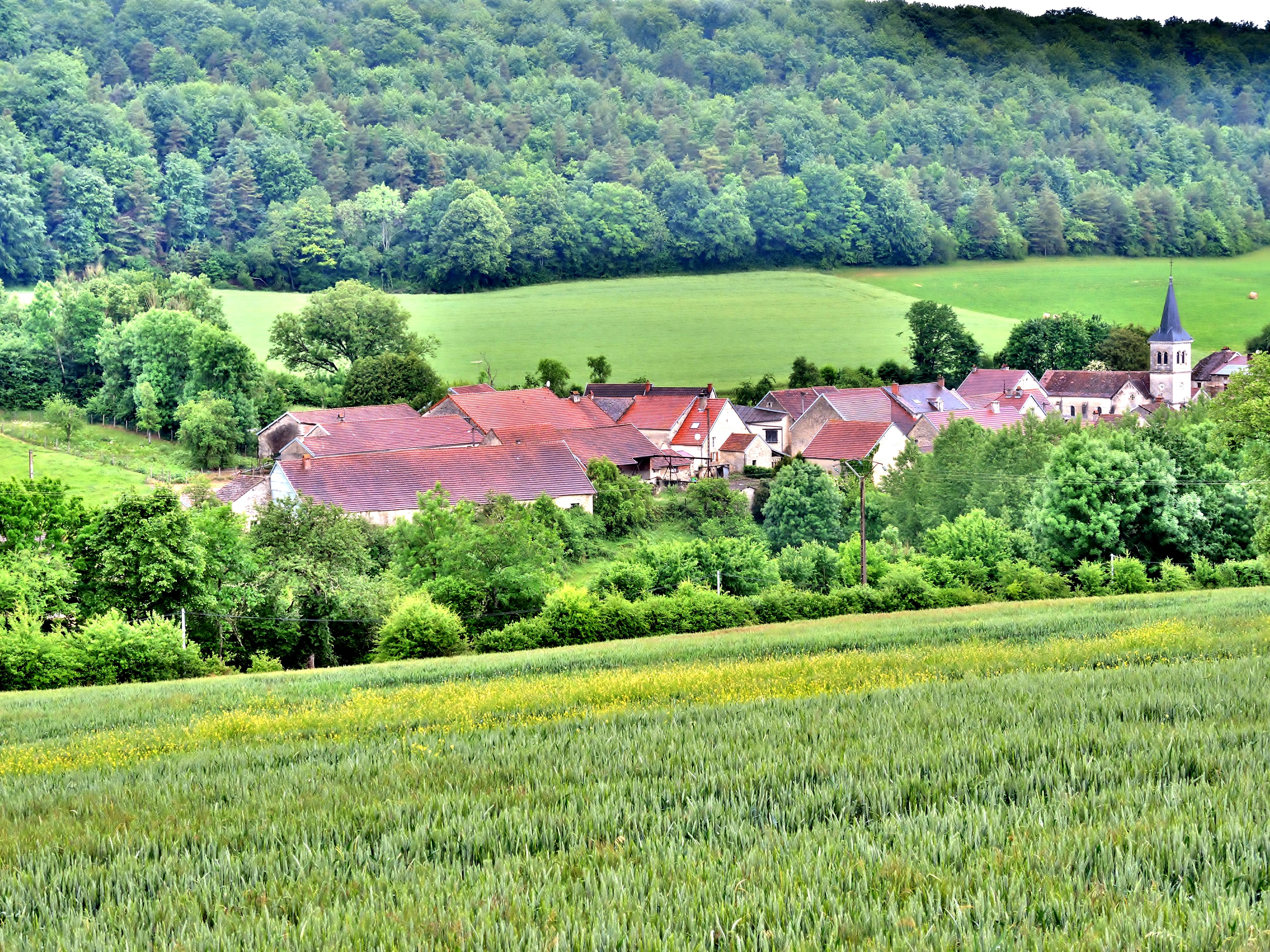
- A general view of Germaines
- Location of Germaines
- Location within France Location within Grand Est
- Coordinates: 47°47′58″N 5°01′59″E
- Country: France
- Region: Grand Est
- Department: Haute-Marne
- Arrondissement: Langres
- Canton: Villegusien-le-Lac
- Intercommunality: Auberive Vingeanne et Montsaugeonnais

Government
  - Mayor (2020–2026): Jean-Paul Andriot
- Area^{1}: 8.69 km^{2} (3.36 sq mi)
- Elevation: 345 m (1,132 ft)
- Highest elevation: 455 m (1,493 ft)
- Lowest elevation: 335 m (1,099 ft)
- Population (2023): 47
  - Density: 5.4/km^{2} (14/sq mi)
- Time zone: UTC+01:00 (CET)
  - Summer (DST): UTC+02:00 (CEST)
- INSEE/Postal code: 52216 /52160
- ^{1} French Land Register data, which excludes lakes, ponds, glaciers > 1 km^{2} (0.386 sq mi or 247 acres) and river estuaries.

Germaines (French pronunciation: [ʒɛʁmɛn]) is a commune in the Haute-Marne department in north-eastern France.

== See also ==
- Communes of the Haute-Marne department
