= Le Val-d'Esnoms =

- Commune
- Coat of arms
- Location of Le Val-d'Esnoms
- Location within France Location within Grand Est
- Coordinates: 47°41′22″N 5°12′51″E
- Country: France
- Region: Grand Est
- Department: Haute-Marne
- Arrondissement: Langres
- Canton: Villegusien-le-Lac
- Intercommunality: Auberive Vingeanne et Montsaugeonnais

Government
  - Mayor (2020–2026): Philippe Rachet
- Area^{1}: 32.48 km^{2} (12.54 sq mi)
- Elevation: 321 m (1,053 ft)
- Population (2023): 347
  - Density: 10.7/km^{2} (27.7/sq mi)
- Time zone: UTC+01:00 (CET)
  - Summer (DST): UTC+02:00 (CEST)
- INSEE/Postal code: 52189 /52190
- ^{1} French Land Register data, which excludes lakes, ponds, glaciers > 1 km^{2} (0.386 sq mi or 247 acres) and river estuaries.

Le Val-d'Esnoms (French pronunciation: [lə val denɔ̃]) is a commune in the Haute-Marne department in north-eastern France.

== See also ==
- Communes of the Haute-Marne department
