= Vivey =

- Commune
- Location of Vivey
- Location within France Location within Grand Est
- Coordinates: 47°44′03″N 5°04′01″E
- Country: France
- Region: Grand Est
- Department: Haute-Marne
- Arrondissement: Langres
- Canton: Villegusien-le-Lac
- Intercommunality: Auberive Vingeanne et Montsaugeonnais

Government
  - Mayor (2020–2026): Nicolas Lenoir
- Area^{1}: 13.05 km^{2} (5.04 sq mi)
- Elevation: 478 m (1,568 ft)
- Highest elevation: 488 m (1,601 ft)
- Lowest elevation: 365 m (1,198 ft)
- Population (2023): 51
  - Density: 3.9/km^{2} (10/sq mi)
- Time zone: UTC+01:00 (CET)
  - Summer (DST): UTC+02:00 (CEST)
- INSEE/Postal code: 52542 /52160
- ^{1} French Land Register data, which excludes lakes, ponds, glaciers > 1 km^{2} (0.386 sq mi or 247 acres) and river estuaries.

Vivey (French pronunciation: [vivɛ]) is a commune in the Haute-Marne department in north-eastern France.

== See also ==
- Communes of the Haute-Marne department
