= Noidant-Chatenoy =

- Commune
- Coat of arms
- Location of Noidant-Chatenoy
- Location within France Location within Grand Est
- Coordinates: 47°47′44″N 5°22′38″E
- Country: France
- Region: Grand Est
- Department: Haute-Marne
- Arrondissement: Langres
- Canton: Chalindrey

Government
  - Mayor (2020–2026): Sylvie Lefevre
- Area^{1}: 5.21 km^{2} (2.01 sq mi)
- Elevation: 325 m (1,066 ft)
- Highest elevation: 468 m (1,535 ft)
- Lowest elevation: 339 m (1,112 ft)
- Population (2023): 79
  - Density: 15/km^{2} (39/sq mi)
- Time zone: UTC+01:00 (CET)
  - Summer (DST): UTC+02:00 (CEST)
- INSEE/Postal code: 52354 /52600
- ^{1} French Land Register data, which excludes lakes, ponds, glaciers > 1 km^{2} (0.386 sq mi or 247 acres) and river estuaries.

Noidant-Chatenoy (French pronunciation: [nwadɑ̃ ʃatənwa]) is a commune in the Haute-Marne department in north-eastern France.

== See also ==
- Communes of the Haute-Marne department
