= Coiffy-le-Bas =

- Commune
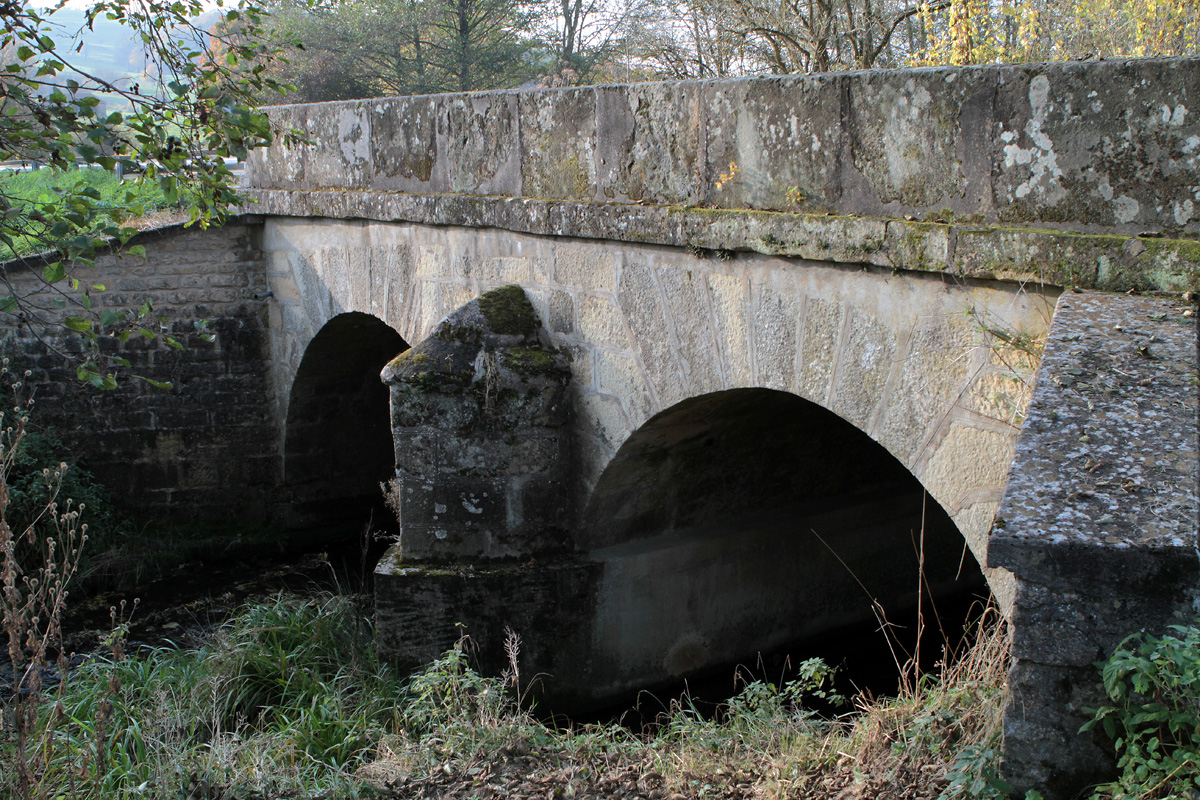
- The bridge over the Petit Amance in Coiffy-le-Bas
- Location of Coiffy-le-Bas
- Location within France Location within Grand Est
- Coordinates: 47°54′54″N 5°40′41″E
- Country: France
- Region: Grand Est
- Department: Haute-Marne
- Arrondissement: Langres
- Canton: Chalindrey
- Intercommunality: Savoir-Faire

Government
  - Mayor (2020–2026): André Gallissot
- Area^{1}: 11.32 km^{2} (4.37 sq mi)
- Elevation: 280 m (920 ft)
- Population (2023): 84
  - Density: 7.4/km^{2} (19/sq mi)
- Demonym(s): Coifféens, Coifféennes
- Time zone: UTC+01:00 (CET)
  - Summer (DST): UTC+02:00 (CEST)
- INSEE/Postal code: 52135 /52400
- ^{1} French Land Register data, which excludes lakes, ponds, glaciers > 1 km^{2} (0.386 sq mi or 247 acres) and river estuaries.

Coiffy-le-Bas (French pronunciation: [kwafi lə ba]) is a commune in the Haute-Marne department in north-eastern France.

== See also ==
- Communes of the Haute-Marne department
