= Perrancey-les-Vieux-Moulins =

- Commune
- Location of Perrancey-les-Vieux-Moulins
- Location within France Location within Grand Est
- Coordinates: 47°51′54″N 5°16′14″E
- Country: France
- Region: Grand Est
- Department: Haute-Marne
- Arrondissement: Langres
- Canton: Langres
- Intercommunality: Grand Langres

Government
  - Mayor (2020–2026): Alain Garnier
- Area^{1}: 17.26 km^{2} (6.66 sq mi)
- Elevation: 294 m (965 ft)
- Highest elevation: 463 m (1,519 ft)
- Lowest elevation: 357 m (1,171 ft)
- Population (2023): 297
  - Density: 17.2/km^{2} (44.6/sq mi)
- Time zone: UTC+01:00 (CET)
  - Summer (DST): UTC+02:00 (CEST)
- INSEE/Postal code: 52383 /52200
- ^{1} French Land Register data, which excludes lakes, ponds, glaciers > 1 km^{2} (0.386 sq mi or 247 acres) and river estuaries.

Perrancey-les-Vieux-Moulins (French pronunciation: [peʁɑ̃sɛ le vjø mulɛ̃]) is a commune in the Haute-Marne department in north-eastern France.

== See also ==
- Communes of the Haute-Marne department
