= Rivières-le-Bois =

- Commune
- Location of Rivières-le-Bois
- Location within France Location within Grand Est
- Coordinates: 47°44′18″N 5°26′34″E
- Country: France
- Region: Grand Est
- Department: Haute-Marne
- Arrondissement: Langres
- Canton: Chalindrey

Government
  - Mayor (2020–2026): Pierre Bastoul
- Area^{1}: 7.14 km^{2} (2.76 sq mi)
- Elevation: 350 m (1,150 ft)
- Highest elevation: 372 m (1,220 ft)
- Lowest elevation: 261 m (856 ft)
- Population (2023): 64
  - Density: 9.0/km^{2} (23/sq mi)
- Time zone: UTC+01:00 (CET)
  - Summer (DST): UTC+02:00 (CEST)
- INSEE/Postal code: 52424 /52600
- ^{1} French Land Register data, which excludes lakes, ponds, glaciers > 1 km^{2} (0.386 sq mi or 247 acres) and river estuaries.

Rivières-le-Bois (French pronunciation: [ʁivjɛʁ lə bwa]) is a commune in the Haute-Marne department in north-eastern France.

== See also ==
- Communes of the Haute-Marne department
