= Maâtz =

- Commune
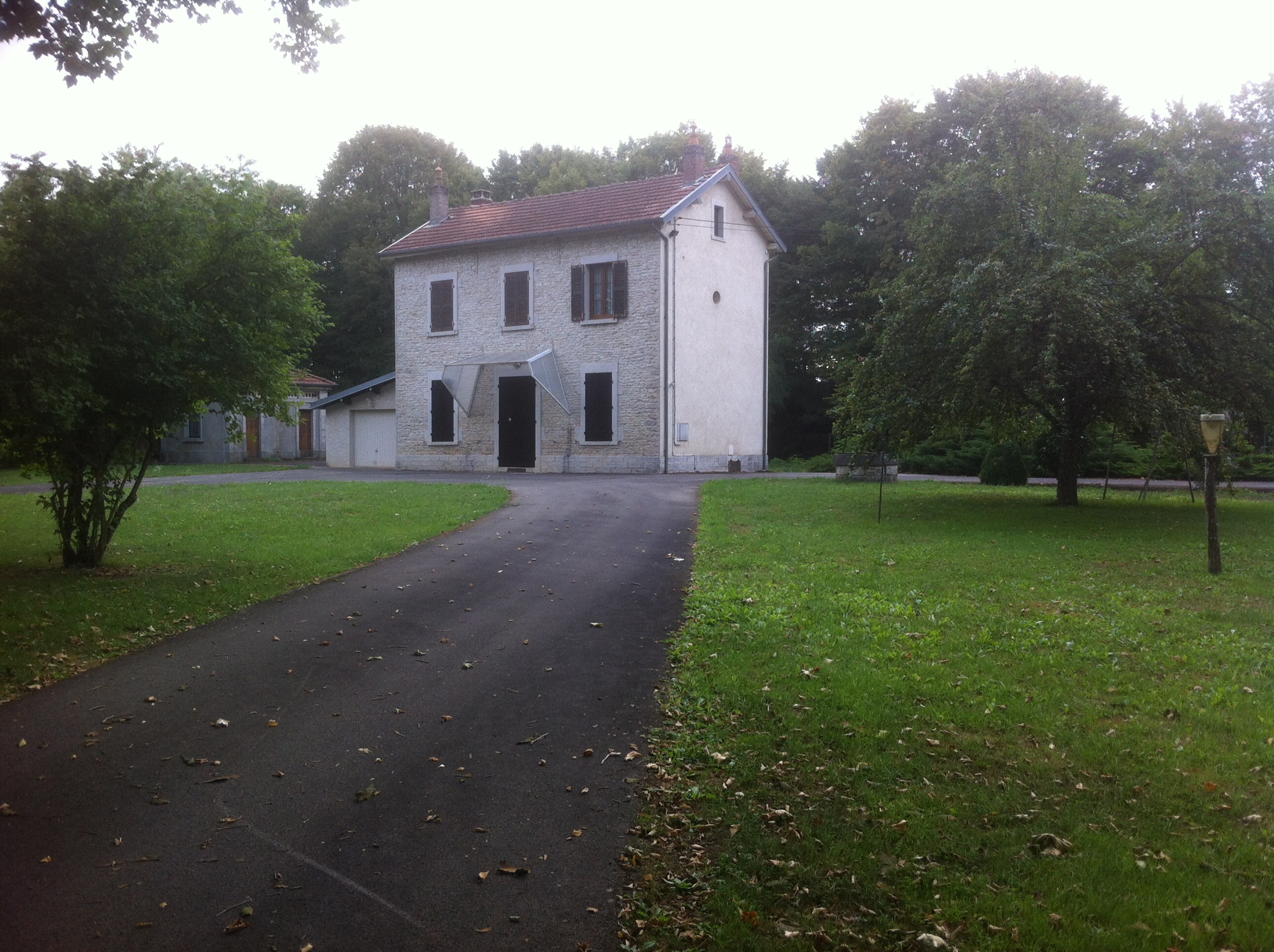
- The former railway station in Maâtz
- Location of Maâtz
- Location within France Location within Grand Est
- Coordinates: 47°42′09″N 5°27′02″E
- Country: France
- Region: Grand Est
- Department: Haute-Marne
- Arrondissement: Langres
- Canton: Villegusien-le-Lac
- Intercommunality: Auberive Vingeanne et Montsaugeonnais

Government
  - Mayor (2020–2026): Thomas Auvigne
- Area^{1}: 10.84 km^{2} (4.19 sq mi)
- Elevation: 269 m (883 ft)
- Population (2023): 72
  - Density: 6.6/km^{2} (17/sq mi)
- Time zone: UTC+01:00 (CET)
  - Summer (DST): UTC+02:00 (CEST)
- INSEE/Postal code: 52298 /52500
- ^{1} French Land Register data, which excludes lakes, ponds, glaciers > 1 km^{2} (0.386 sq mi or 247 acres) and river estuaries.

Maâtz is a commune in the Haute-Marne department in north-eastern France.

== Population ==
Historical population
Year	Pop.	±% p.a.
1968	145	—
1975	130	−1.55%
1982	132	+0.22%
1990	107	−2.59%
1999	93	−1.55%
2007	81	−1.71%
2012	84	+0.73%
2017	75	−2.24%
2023	72	−0.68%
Source: INSEE

== See also ==
- Communes of the Haute-Marne department
