= Le Pailly =

- Commune
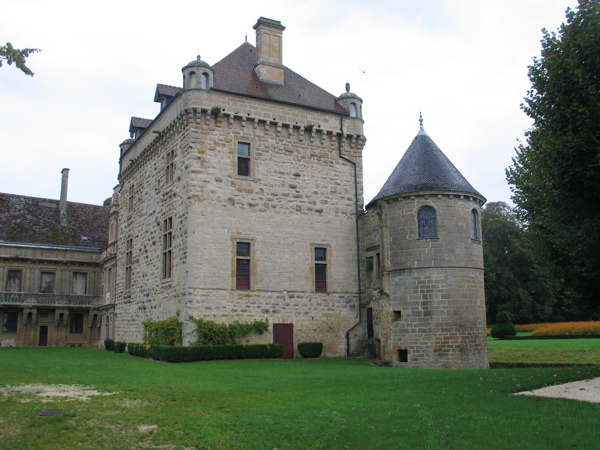
- The chateau in Le Pailly

- Coat of arms
- Location of Le Pailly
- Location within France Location within Grand Est
- Coordinates: 47°47′29″N 5°24′53″E
- Country: France
- Region: Grand Est
- Department: Haute-Marne
- Arrondissement: Langres
- Canton: Chalindrey

Government
  - Mayor (2020–2026): Franck Bugaud
- Area^{1}: 7.21 km^{2} (2.78 sq mi)
- Elevation: 325 m (1,066 ft)
- Highest elevation: 467 m (1,532 ft)
- Lowest elevation: 283 m (928 ft)
- Population (2023): 270
  - Density: 37/km^{2} (97/sq mi)
- Time zone: UTC+01:00 (CET)
  - Summer (DST): UTC+02:00 (CEST)
- INSEE/Postal code: 52374 /52600
- ^{1} French Land Register data, which excludes lakes, ponds, glaciers > 1 km^{2} (0.386 sq mi or 247 acres) and river estuaries.

Le Pailly (French pronunciation: [lə paji]) is a commune in the Haute-Marne department in north-eastern France.

== See also ==
- Communes of the Haute-Marne department
