= Lavernoy =

- Commune
- Location of Lavernoy
- Location within France Location within Grand Est
- Coordinates: 47°55′12″N 5°34′02″E
- Country: France
- Region: Grand Est
- Department: Haute-Marne
- Arrondissement: Langres
- Canton: Bourbonne-les-Bains
- Intercommunality: Grand Langres

Government
  - Mayor (2020–2026): Patrick Gallissot
- Area^{1}: 4.5 km^{2} (1.7 sq mi)
- Elevation: 358 m (1,175 ft)
- Population (2023): 74
  - Density: 16/km^{2} (43/sq mi)
- Demonym(s): Lavernais, Lavernaises
- Time zone: UTC+01:00 (CET)
  - Summer (DST): UTC+02:00 (CEST)
- INSEE/Postal code: 52275 /52140
- ^{1} French Land Register data, which excludes lakes, ponds, glaciers > 1 km^{2} (0.386 sq mi or 247 acres) and river estuaries.

Lavernoy (French pronunciation: [lavɛʁnwa]) is a commune in the Haute-Marne department in north-eastern France.

== See also ==
- Communes of the Haute-Marne department
