= Les Loges, Haute-Marne =

Les Loges
- Commune
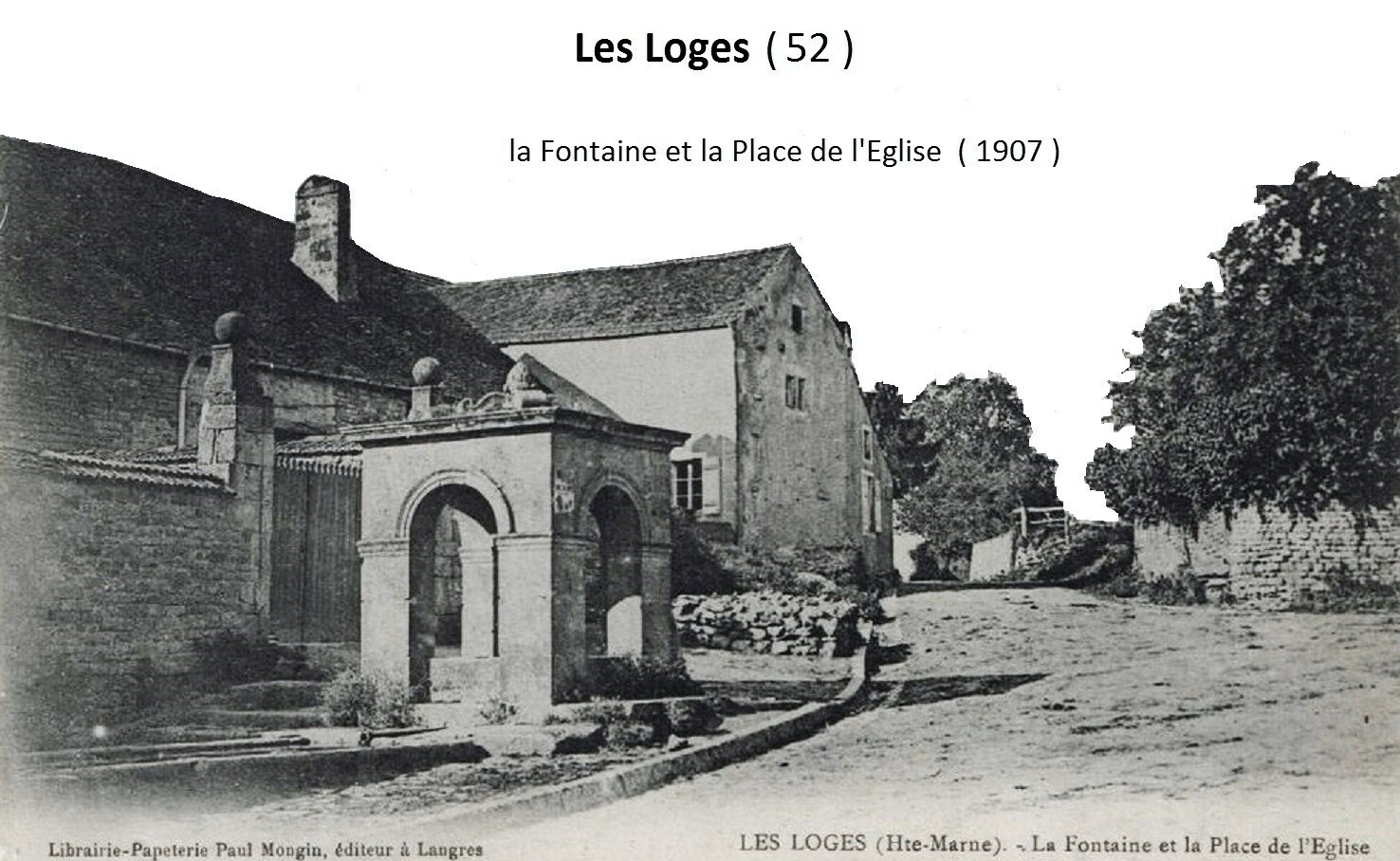
- 1907 Photo of the Church Square
- Location of Les Loges
- Location within France Location within Grand Est
- Coordinates: 47°47′06″N 5°29′31″E
- Country: France
- Region: Grand Est
- Department: Haute-Marne
- Arrondissement: Langres
- Canton: Chalindrey
- Intercommunality: CC des Savoir-Faire

Government
  - Mayor (2024–2026): Martine Deroletz
- Area^{1}: 10.79 km^{2} (4.17 sq mi)
- Elevation: 332 m (1,089 ft)
- Highest elevation: 372 m (1,220 ft)
- Lowest elevation: 262 m (860 ft)
- Population (2023): 124
  - Density: 11.5/km^{2} (29.8/sq mi)
- Time zone: UTC+01:00 (CET)
  - Summer (DST): UTC+02:00 (CEST)
- INSEE/Postal code: 52290 /52500
- ^{1} French Land Register data, which excludes lakes, ponds, glaciers > 1 km^{2} (0.386 sq mi or 247 acres) and river estuaries.

Les Loges (French pronunciation: [le lɔʒ]) is a commune in the Haute-Marne department in north-eastern France.

== See also ==
- Communes of the Haute-Marne department
