= Pressigny, Haute-Marne =

Pressigny
- Commune
- Coat of arms
- Location of Pressigny
- Location within France Location within Grand Est
- Coordinates: 47°44′54″N 5°39′54″E
- Country: France
- Region: Grand Est
- Department: Haute-Marne
- Arrondissement: Langres
- Canton: Chalindrey

Government
  - Mayor (2022–2026): Dominique Labas
- Area^{1}: 22.61 km^{2} (8.73 sq mi)
- Elevation: 380 m (1,250 ft)
- Highest elevation: 383 m (1,257 ft)
- Lowest elevation: 273 m (896 ft)
- Population (2023): 195
  - Density: 8.62/km^{2} (22.3/sq mi)
- Time zone: UTC+01:00 (CET)
  - Summer (DST): UTC+02:00 (CEST)
- INSEE/Postal code: 52406 /52500
- ^{1} French Land Register data, which excludes lakes, ponds, glaciers > 1 km^{2} (0.386 sq mi or 247 acres) and river estuaries.

Pressigny (French pronunciation: [pʁɛsiɲi]) is a commune in the Haute-Marne department in north-eastern France.

== See also ==
- Communes of the Haute-Marne department
