= Bize, Haute-Marne =

Bize
- Commune
- Location of Bize
- Location within France Location within Grand Est
- Coordinates: 47°50′23″N 5°38′03″E
- Country: France
- Region: Grand Est
- Department: Haute-Marne
- Arrondissement: Langres
- Canton: Chalindrey

Government
  - Mayor (2020–2026): Antoine Zapata
- Area^{1}: 2.09 km^{2} (0.81 sq mi)
- Elevation: 225 m (738 ft)
- Highest elevation: 322 m (1,056 ft)
- Lowest elevation: 232 m (761 ft)
- Population (2023): 79
  - Density: 38/km^{2} (98/sq mi)
- Time zone: UTC+01:00 (CET)
  - Summer (DST): UTC+02:00 (CEST)
- INSEE/Postal code: 52051 /52500
- ^{1} French Land Register data, which excludes lakes, ponds, glaciers > 1 km^{2} (0.386 sq mi or 247 acres) and river estuaries.

Bize (French pronunciation: [biz]) is a commune in the Haute-Marne department in northeastern France.

== Population ==
Historical population
Year	Pop.	±% p.a.
1968	59	—
1975	54	−1.26%
1982	56	+0.52%
1990	44	−2.97%
1999	71	+5.46%
2007	79	+1.34%
2012	87	+1.95%
2017	92	+1.12%
2023	79	−2.51%
Source: INSEE

== See also ==
- Communes of the Haute-Marne department
