= Celsoy =

- Commune
- Location of Celsoy
- Location within France Location within Grand Est
- Coordinates: 47°51′42″N 5°28′45″E
- Country: France
- Region: Grand Est
- Department: Haute-Marne
- Arrondissement: Langres
- Canton: Chalindrey
- Intercommunality: Savoir-Faire

Government
  - Mayor (2020–2026): Denis Billant
- Area^{1}: 5.42 km^{2} (2.09 sq mi)
- Elevation: 330 m (1,080 ft)
- Highest elevation: 428 m (1,404 ft)
- Lowest elevation: 309 m (1,014 ft)
- Population (2023): 87
  - Density: 16/km^{2} (42/sq mi)
- Demonym(s): Chachots, Chachottes
- Time zone: UTC+01:00 (CET)
  - Summer (DST): UTC+02:00 (CEST)
- INSEE/Postal code: 52090 /52600
- ^{1} French Land Register data, which excludes lakes, ponds, glaciers > 1 km^{2} (0.386 sq mi or 247 acres) and river estuaries.

Celsoy (French pronunciation: [sɛlswa]) is a commune in the Haute-Marne department in north-eastern France.

== See also ==
- Communes of the Haute-Marne department
