= Amance (river) =

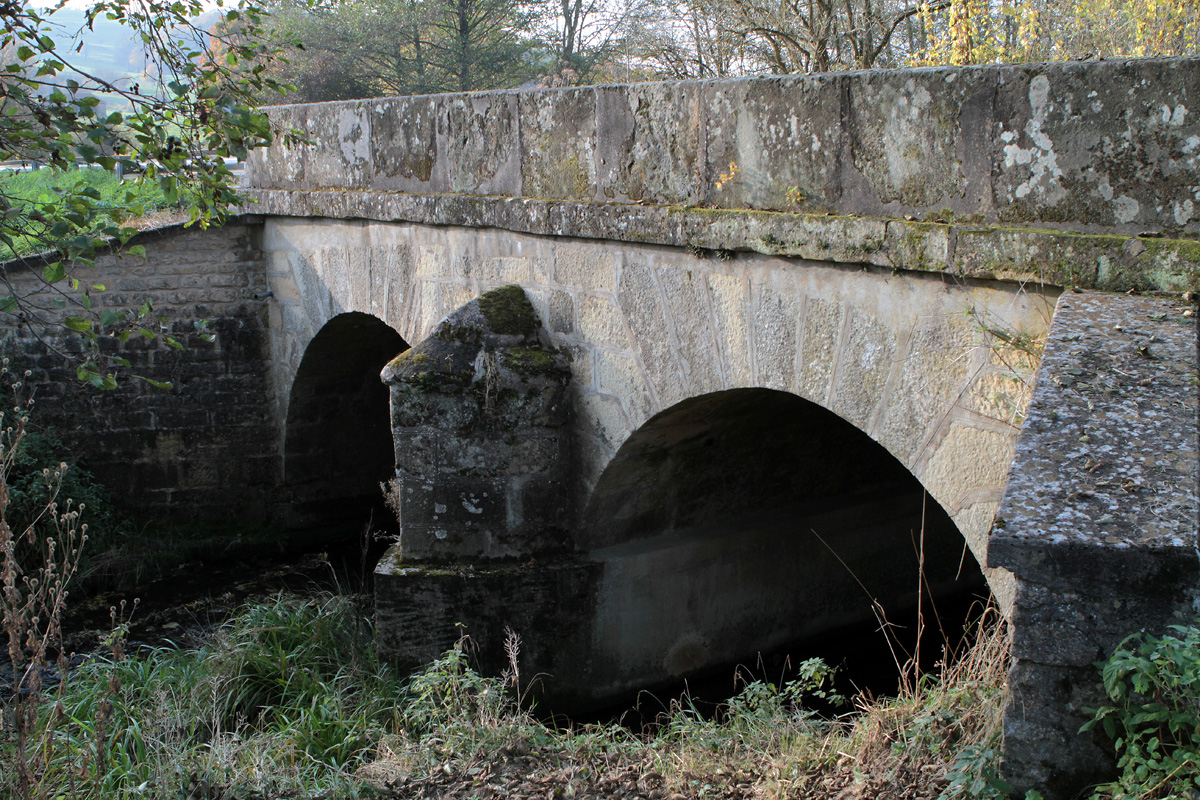

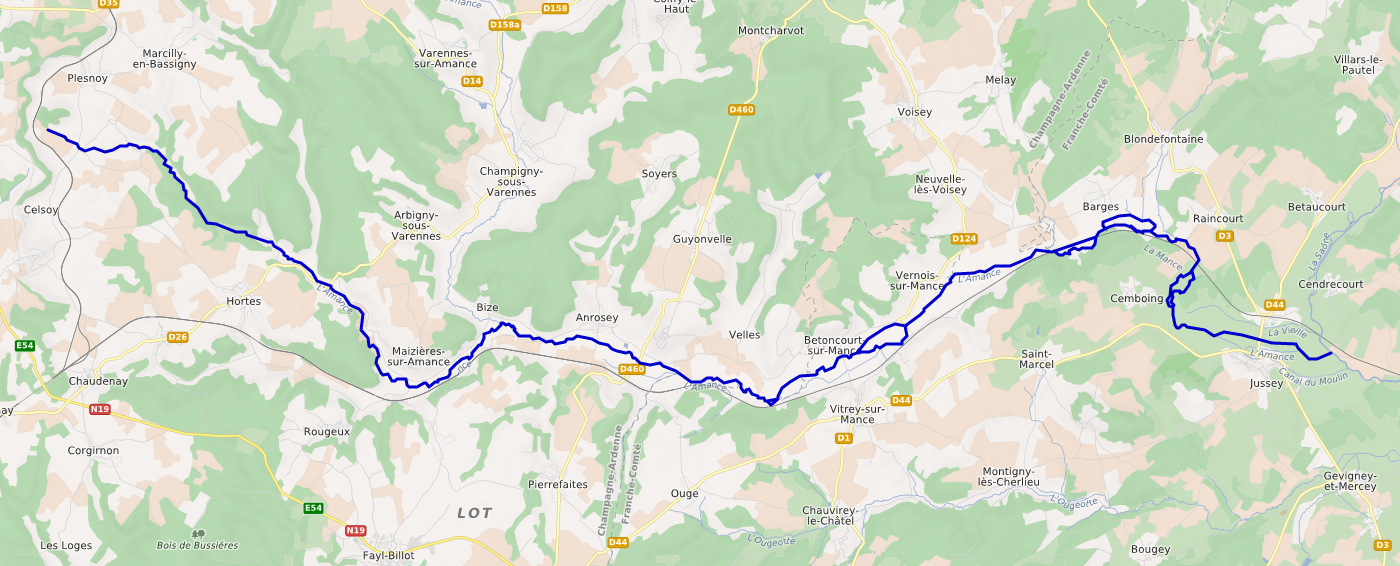

Location
- Country: France

Physical characteristics
- Mouth: Saône
  - coordinates: 47.8287°N 5.9246°E
- Length: 47 km (29 mi)

Basin features
- Progression: Saône→ Rhône→ Mediterranean Sea

The Amance (French pronunciation: [amɑ̃s]; or Mance) is a river that traverses the departments of Haute-Marne and Haute-Saône in eastern France. It rises in Celsoy and flows generally east to join the Saône at Jussey. It is 47.0 km (29.2 mi) long.
