= La Mothe-en-Bassigny =

Ruined citadel in Vosges, France

Coordinates: 48°12′41″N 5°41′8″E

A citadel of the Duchy of Lorraine, La Mothe-en-Bassigny was built up over centuries to fight back intermittent waves of French invaders, by whose hands it was besieged in 1634 leading to its surrender, temporary return to the Duke, three further sieges and ordered destruction in 1645. It remains a ruin.

It is between the villages of Outremécourt and Soulaucourt-sur-Mouzon (Haute-Marne), west of Neufchâteau, Vosges.

== History ==
The citadel was founded in 1258 and soon became a key commercial town of 2,000 inhabitants. In the 17th century, the Duke of Lorraine Charles IV lost all his possessions to cardinal Richelieu except La Mothe. In 1634, the citadel withstood a siege of 141 days before it surrendered on 26 July 1634.

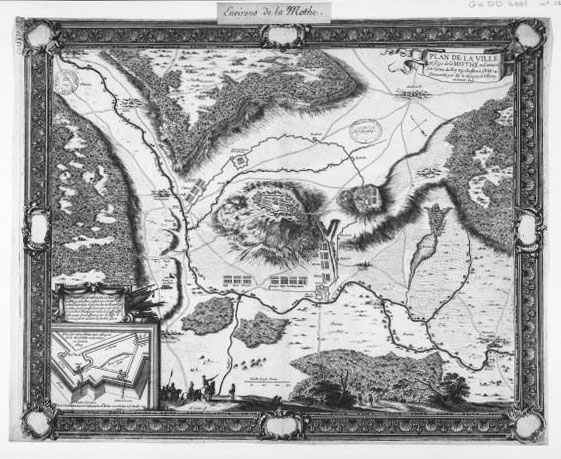
A map of la Mothe during its siege of 1645

La Mothe was given back to the Duke in 1641. It was besieged three more times: 25 July - 30 August 1642, December 1642 - May 1643 and the last, begun by Mazarin, on 4 December 1644. After 205 days of resistance the city surrendered on 1 July 1645. Contrary to the agreement, Mazarin destroyed not only the fortifications, but the entire city.

This period was always a painful memory in Lorraine. French authorities, conscious of this, divided as France into its departments so that La Mothe forms a projection of Haute-Marne. This removed a brusque reminder of French triumph from Lorraine.

The ruins were classified as an "historical monument" in 1923 and large-scale restoration work was undertaken.
