= Pautaines-Augeville =

- Part of Épizon
- Location of Pautaines-Augeville
- Location within France Location within Grand Est
- Coordinates: 48°21′11″N 5°18′56″E
- Country: France
- Region: Grand Est
- Department: Haute-Marne
- Arrondissement: Saint-Dizier
- Canton: Poissons
- Commune: Épizon
- Area^{1}: 14.42 km^{2} (5.57 sq mi)
- Elevation: 365 m (1,198 ft)
- Highest elevation: 398 m (1,306 ft)
- Lowest elevation: 252 m (827 ft)
- Population (2022): 28
  - Density: 1.9/km^{2} (5.0/sq mi)
- Time zone: UTC+01:00 (CET)
  - Summer (DST): UTC+02:00 (CEST)
- Postal code: 52270
- ^{1} French Land Register data, which excludes lakes, ponds, glaciers > 1 km^{2} (0.386 sq mi or 247 acres) and river estuaries.

Pautaines-Augeville (French pronunciation: [potɛn oʒvil]) is a former commune in the Haute-Marne department in north-eastern France. On 28 February 2013, Pautaines-Augeville was annexed by the commune of Épizon.
