= Jeanne II =

Jeanne II may refer to:

- Jeanne II of Burgundy (1292–1330)
- Jeanne II of Navarre (1312–1349)
- Jeanne II d'Auvergne (1378 – c. 1424)
- Jeanne II d'Anglure (14?? – 1505)
