= Vesaignes-sous-Lafauche =

- Commune
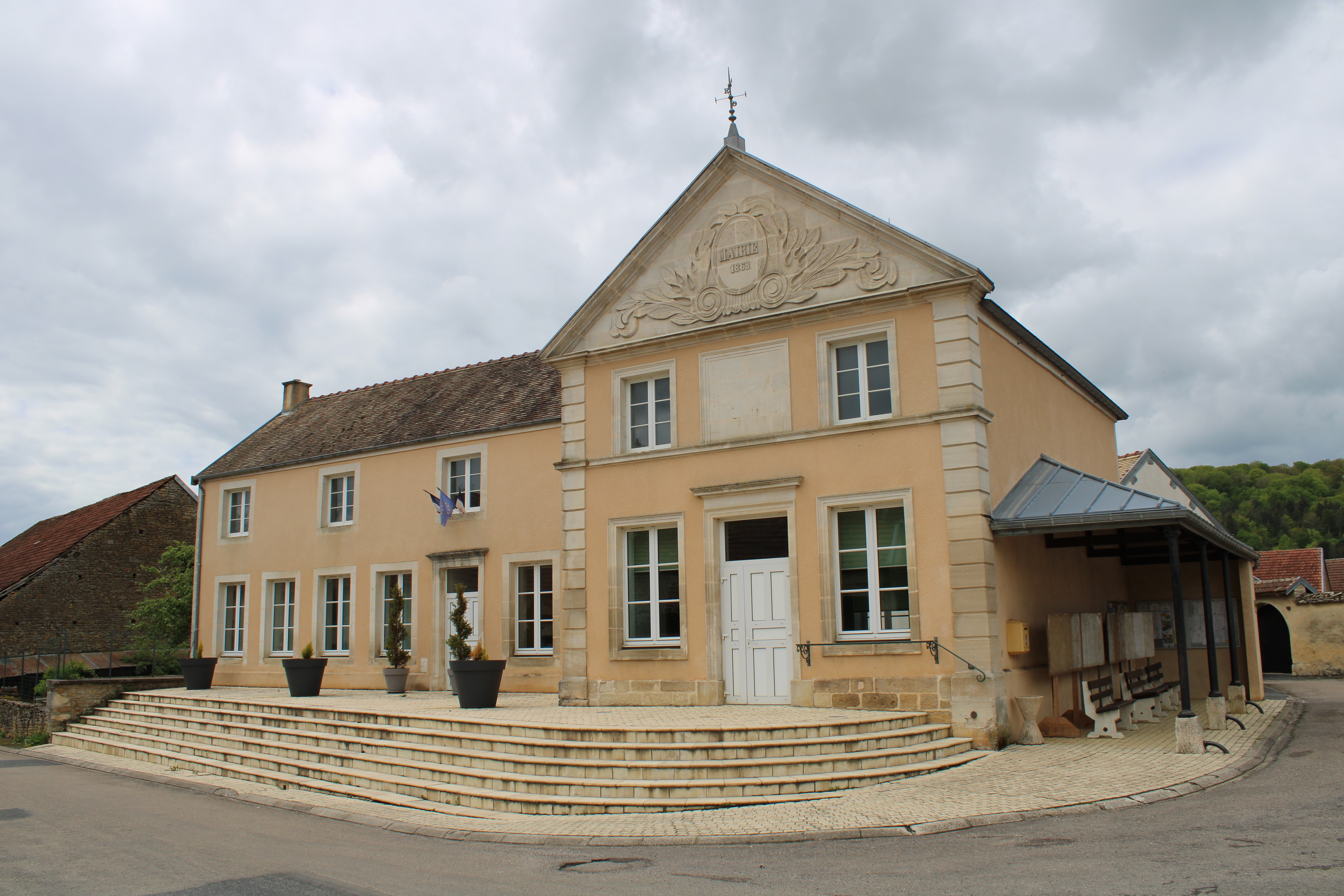
- The town hall in Vesaignes-sous-Lafauche
- Location of Vesaignes-sous-Lafauche
- Location within France Location within Grand Est
- Coordinates: 48°16′53″N 5°26′06″E
- Country: France
- Region: Grand Est
- Department: Haute-Marne
- Arrondissement: Chaumont
- Canton: Poissons

Government
  - Mayor (2020–2026): Philippe Graillot
- Area^{1}: 13.78 km^{2} (5.32 sq mi)
- Elevation: 326 m (1,070 ft)
- Population (2023): 116
  - Density: 8.42/km^{2} (21.8/sq mi)
- Time zone: UTC+01:00 (CET)
  - Summer (DST): UTC+02:00 (CEST)
- INSEE/Postal code: 52517 /52700
- ^{1} French Land Register data, which excludes lakes, ponds, glaciers > 1 km^{2} (0.386 sq mi or 247 acres) and river estuaries.

Vesaignes-sous-Lafauche (French pronunciation: [vəzɛɲ su lafoʃ], literally Vesaignes under Lafauche) is a commune in the Haute-Marne department in north-eastern France.

== See also ==
- Communes of the Haute-Marne department
