= Prez-sous-Lafauche =

- Commune
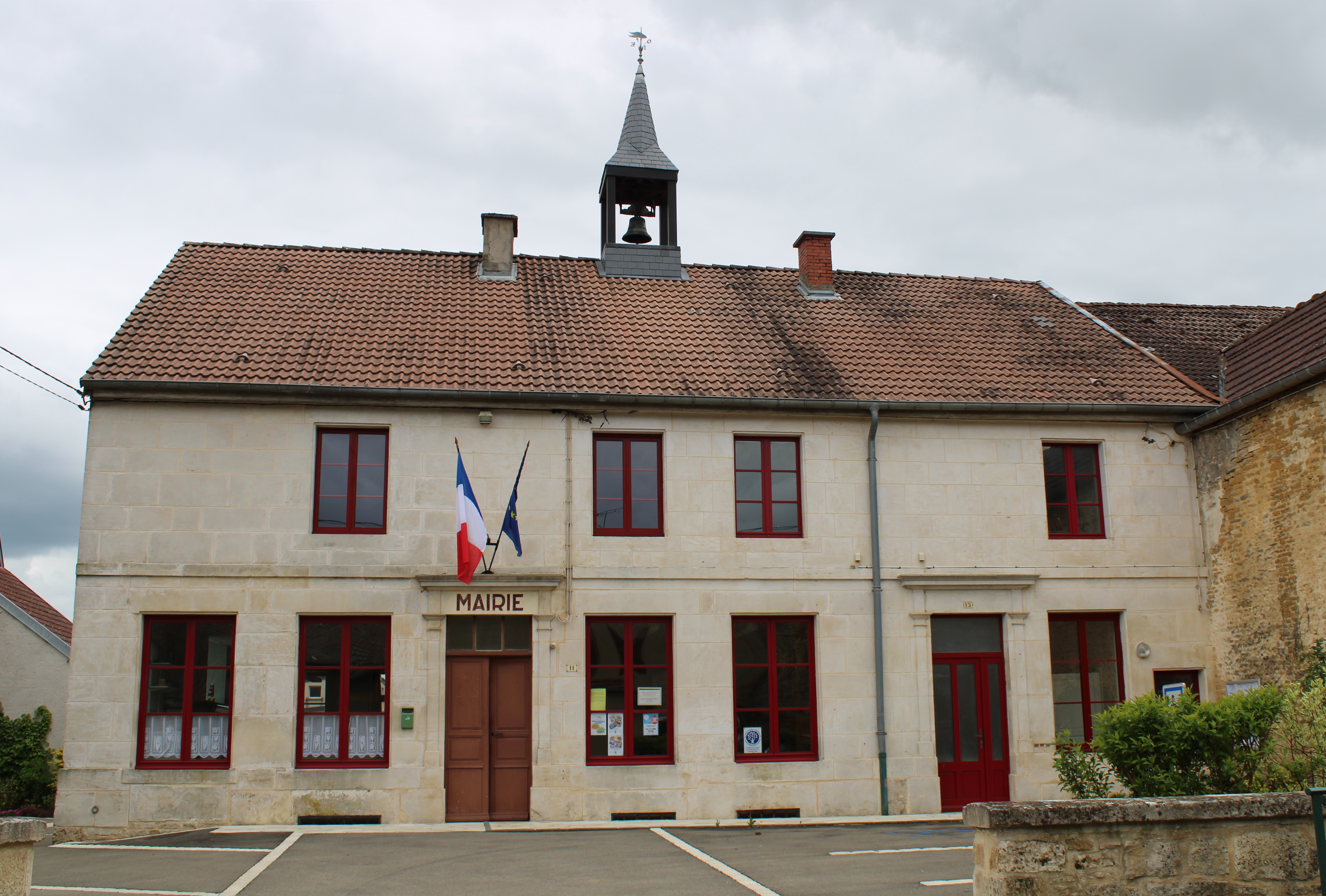
- The town hall in Prez-sous-Lafauche

- Coat of arms
- Location of Prez-sous-Lafauche
- Location within France Location within Grand Est
- Coordinates: 48°17′14″N 5°29′36″E
- Country: France
- Region: Grand Est
- Department: Haute-Marne
- Arrondissement: Chaumont
- Canton: Poissons

Government
  - Mayor (2020–2026): Thierry Mocquet
- Area^{1}: 22.59 km^{2} (8.72 sq mi)
- Elevation: 330 m (1,080 ft)
- Population (2023): 276
  - Density: 12.2/km^{2} (31.6/sq mi)
- Time zone: UTC+01:00 (CET)
  - Summer (DST): UTC+02:00 (CEST)
- INSEE/Postal code: 52407 /52700
- ^{1} French Land Register data, which excludes lakes, ponds, glaciers > 1 km^{2} (0.386 sq mi or 247 acres) and river estuaries.

Prez-sous-Lafauche (French pronunciation: [pʁe su lafoʃ], literally Prez under Lafauche) is a commune in the Haute-Marne department in north-eastern France.

== See also ==
- Communes of the Haute-Marne department
