= Millières =

Millières may refer to the following communes in northern France:

- Millières, Manche
- Millières, Haute-Marne
