= Jeanne II d'Anglure =

Jeanne II d'Anglure (died 1505), was a German-Roman monarch as Princess Abbess of the Imperial Remiremont Abbey in France between 1474 and 1505.

She was made Dame Doyenne during the reign of Alix de Paroye in 1453–1473. After the death of Paroye, Catherine de Neufchatel was elected abbess, but never confirmed as such. Instead, Jeanne II was elected and installed in the office. During her reign, the nuns declared themselves canonesses without the pope's consent, did not take the vows and restricted membership to those proven to be of noble descent.

Jeanne II d'Anglure was also Dame de Germainvilliers.
