= Cirfontaines-en-Ornois =

- Commune
- Coat of arms
- Location of Cirfontaines-en-Ornois
- Location within France Location within Grand Est
- Coordinates: 48°27′20″N 5°23′17″E
- Country: France
- Region: Grand Est
- Department: Haute-Marne
- Arrondissement: Saint-Dizier
- Canton: Poissons
- Intercommunality: Bassin de Joinville en Champagne

Government
  - Mayor (2020–2026): Annick Verron
- Area^{1}: 13.95 km^{2} (5.39 sq mi)
- Elevation: 450 m (1,480 ft)
- Highest elevation: 423 m (1,388 ft)
- Lowest elevation: 323 m (1,060 ft)
- Population (2023): 89
  - Density: 6.4/km^{2} (17/sq mi)
- Time zone: UTC+01:00 (CET)
  - Summer (DST): UTC+02:00 (CEST)
- INSEE/Postal code: 52131 /52230
- ^{1} French Land Register data, which excludes lakes, ponds, glaciers > 1 km^{2} (0.386 sq mi or 247 acres) and river estuaries.

Cirfontaines-en-Ornois (French pronunciation: [siʁfɔ̃tɛn ɑ̃.n‿ɔʁnwa]) is a commune in the Haute-Marne department in north-eastern France.

== Climate ==
On average, Cirfontaines-en-Ornois experiences 66.5 days per year with a minimum temperature below 0 °C (32.0 °F), 2.5 days per year with a minimum temperature below −10 °C (14.0 °F), 11.4 days per year with a maximum temperature below 0 °C (32.0 °F), and 11.3 days per year with a maximum temperature above 30 °C (86.0 °F). The record high temperature was 40.0 °C (104.0 °F) on August 12, 2003, while the record low temperature was −19.6 °C (−3.3 °F) on February 6, 1963.

Climate data for Cirfontaines-en-Ornois (1991–2020 normals, extremes 1959–present)
Month	Jan	Feb	Mar	Apr	May	Jun	Jul	Aug	Sep	Oct	Nov	Dec	Year
Record high °C (°F)	14.8 (58.6)	22.8 (73.0)	25.3 (77.5)	28.0 (82.4)	32.1 (89.8)	35.7 (96.3)	39.4 (102.9)	40.0 (104.0)	34.2 (93.6)	27.7 (81.9)	21.7 (71.1)	17.0 (62.6)	40.0 (104.0)
Mean daily maximum °C (°F)	4.7 (40.5)	6.3 (43.3)	10.9 (51.6)	15.0 (59.0)	18.7 (65.7)	22.4 (72.3)	24.7 (76.5)	24.5 (76.1)	20.1 (68.2)	14.7 (58.5)	8.8 (47.8)	5.3 (41.5)	14.7 (58.4)
Daily mean °C (°F)	2.1 (35.8)	3.0 (37.4)	6.4 (43.5)	9.8 (49.6)	13.5 (56.3)	16.9 (62.4)	19.1 (66.4)	18.9 (66.0)	15.0 (59.0)	10.9 (51.6)	6.0 (42.8)	3.0 (37.4)	10.4 (50.7)
Mean daily minimum °C (°F)	−0.4 (31.3)	−0.2 (31.6)	2.0 (35.6)	4.5 (40.1)	8.2 (46.8)	11.3 (52.3)	13.4 (56.1)	13.4 (56.1)	10.0 (50.0)	7.1 (44.8)	3.2 (37.8)	0.6 (33.1)	6.1 (43.0)
Record low °C (°F)	−19.0 (−2.2)	−19.6 (−3.3)	−16.1 (3.0)	−6.2 (20.8)	−3.0 (26.6)	−1.5 (29.3)	3.0 (37.4)	2.8 (37.0)	−0.4 (31.3)	−4.6 (23.7)	−11.9 (10.6)	−17.0 (1.4)	−19.6 (−3.3)
Average precipitation mm (inches)	81.5 (3.21)	71.3 (2.81)	67.8 (2.67)	58.7 (2.31)	80.4 (3.17)	66.0 (2.60)	69.7 (2.74)	78.7 (3.10)	69.4 (2.73)	83.8 (3.30)	83.2 (3.28)	93.6 (3.69)	904.1 (35.61)
Average precipitation days (≥ 1.0 mm)	13.7	11.9	10.8	10.0	11.5	9.8	10.1	9.9	9.4	11.3	12.8	14.1	135.3
Source: Meteociel

== See also ==
- Communes of the Haute-Marne department
