= Champigneulles-en-Bassigny =

- Commune
- Location of Champigneulles-en-Bassigny
- Location within France Location within Grand Est
- Coordinates: 48°07′57″N 5°38′41″E
- Country: France
- Region: Grand Est
- Department: Haute-Marne
- Arrondissement: Chaumont
- Canton: Poissons
- Intercommunality: Meuse Rognon

Government
  - Mayor (2020–2026): Annie Bécus
- Area^{1}: 6.82 km^{2} (2.63 sq mi)
- Elevation: 350 m (1,150 ft)
- Population (2023): 36
  - Density: 5.3/km^{2} (14/sq mi)
- Time zone: UTC+01:00 (CET)
  - Summer (DST): UTC+02:00 (CEST)
- INSEE/Postal code: 52101 /52150
- ^{1} French Land Register data, which excludes lakes, ponds, glaciers > 1 km^{2} (0.386 sq mi or 247 acres) and river estuaries.

Champigneulles-en-Bassigny (French pronunciation: [ʃɑ̃piɲœl ɑ̃ basiɲi]) is a commune in the Haute-Marne department in north-eastern France.

== See also ==
- Communes of the Haute-Marne department
