= Thol-lès-Millières =

- Commune
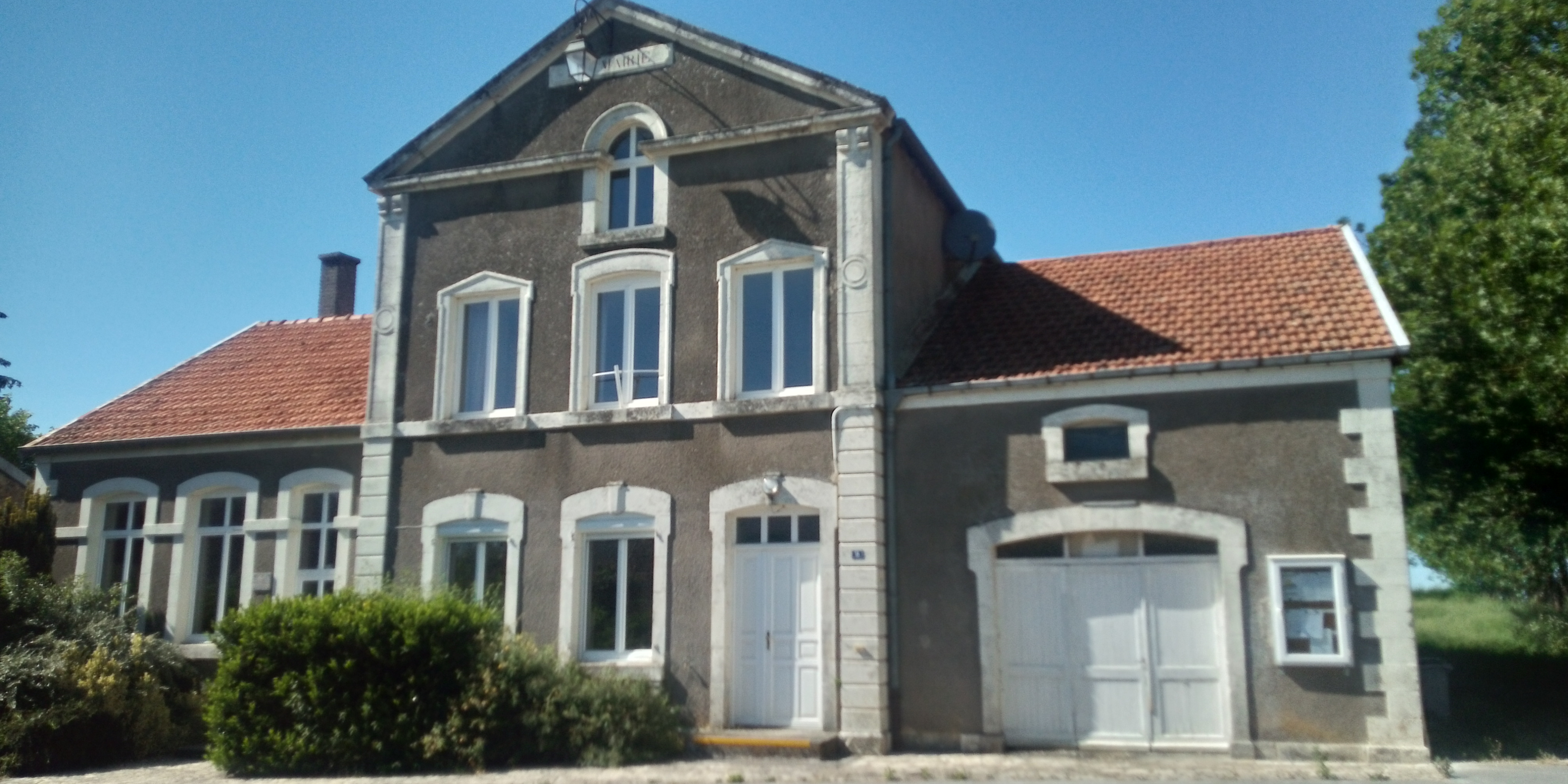
- Town hall
- Location of Thol-lès-Millières
- Location within France Location within Grand Est
- Coordinates: 48°08′48″N 5°28′58″E
- Country: France
- Region: Grand Est
- Department: Haute-Marne
- Arrondissement: Chaumont
- Canton: Poissons

Government
  - Mayor (2020–2026): Gérard Léné
- Area^{1}: 6.91 km^{2} (2.67 sq mi)
- Elevation: 440 m (1,440 ft)
- Population (2023): 28
  - Density: 4.1/km^{2} (10/sq mi)
- Time zone: UTC+01:00 (CET)
  - Summer (DST): UTC+02:00 (CEST)
- INSEE/Postal code: 52489 /52240
- ^{1} French Land Register data, which excludes lakes, ponds, glaciers > 1 km^{2} (0.386 sq mi or 247 acres) and river estuaries.

Thol-lès-Millières is a commune in the Haute-Marne department in north-eastern France.

== See also ==
- Communes of the Haute-Marne department
