= Manois =

Commune in Grand Est, France

- Commune
- Coat of arms
- Location of Manois
- Location within France Location within Grand Est
- Coordinates: 48°16′38″N 5°21′48″E
- Country: France
- Region: Grand Est
- Department: Haute-Marne
- Arrondissement: Chaumont
- Canton: Poissons

Government
  - Mayor (2020–2026): Christelle Gauvain
- Area^{1}: 10.36 km^{2} (4.00 sq mi)
- Elevation: 262 m (860 ft)
- Population (2023): 452
  - Density: 43.6/km^{2} (113/sq mi)
- Time zone: UTC+01:00 (CET)
  - Summer (DST): UTC+02:00 (CEST)
- INSEE/Postal code: 52306 /52700
- ^{1} French Land Register data, which excludes lakes, ponds, glaciers > 1 km^{2} (0.386 sq mi or 247 acres) and river estuaries.

Manois (French pronunciation: [manwa]) is a commune in the Haute-Marne department in north-eastern France.

== See also ==
- Communes of the Haute-Marne department
