= Gillaumé =

- Commune
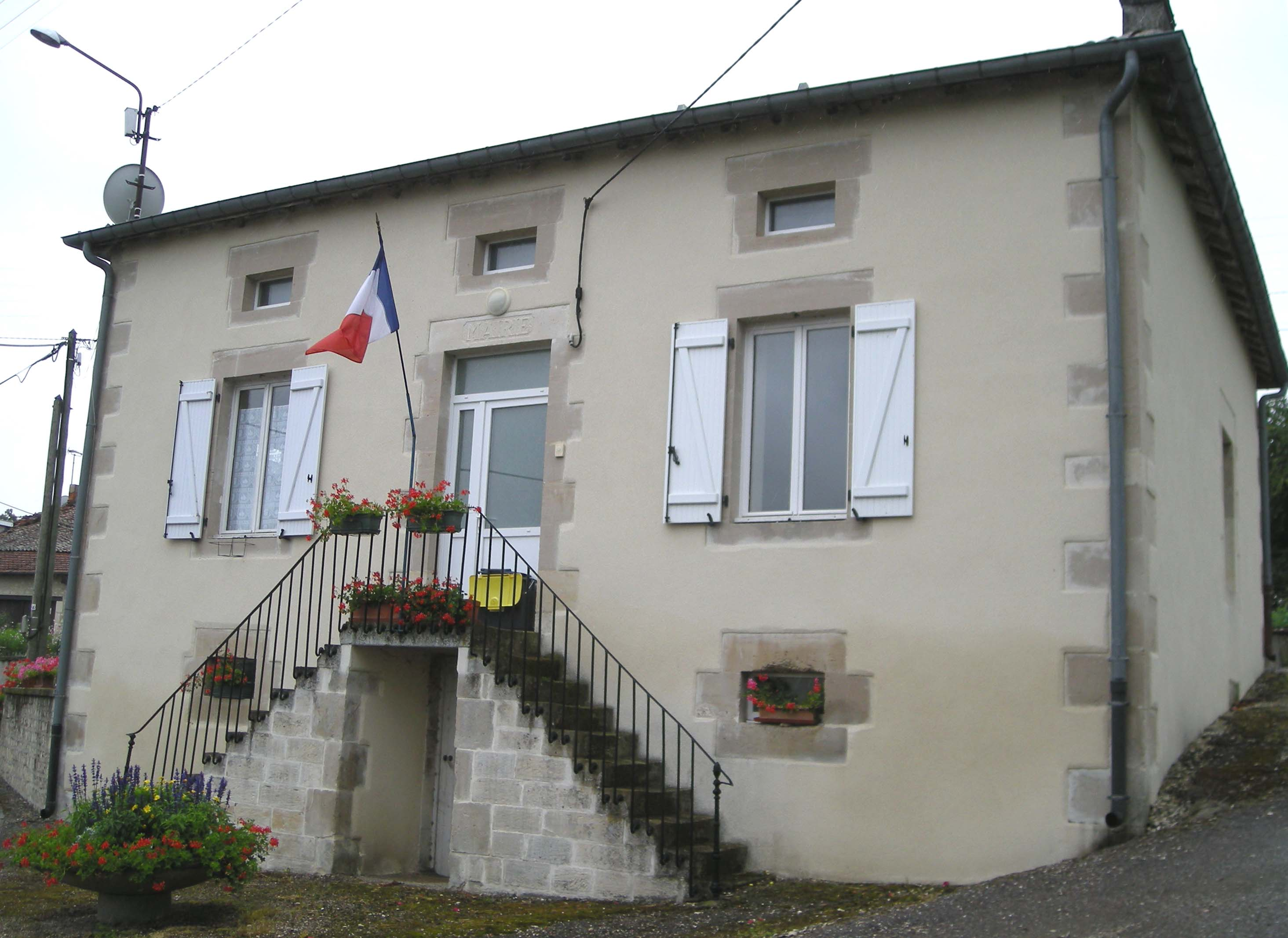
- The town hall in Gillaumé
- Location of Gillaumé
- Location within France Location within Grand Est
- Coordinates: 48°28′19″N 5°20′12″E
- Country: France
- Region: Grand Est
- Department: Haute-Marne
- Arrondissement: Saint-Dizier
- Canton: Poissons
- Intercommunality: Bassin de Joinville en Champagne

Government
  - Mayor (2020–2026): Jean-François Fontaine
- Area^{1}: 5.21 km^{2} (2.01 sq mi)
- Elevation: 300 m (980 ft)
- Highest elevation: 395 m (1,296 ft)
- Lowest elevation: 315 m (1,033 ft)
- Population (2023): 30
  - Density: 5.8/km^{2} (15/sq mi)
- Time zone: UTC+01:00 (CET)
  - Summer (DST): UTC+02:00 (CEST)
- INSEE/Postal code: 52222 /52230
- ^{1} French Land Register data, which excludes lakes, ponds, glaciers > 1 km^{2} (0.386 sq mi or 247 acres) and river estuaries.

Gillaumé is a commune in the Haute-Marne department in north-eastern France.

== See also ==
- Communes of the Haute-Marne department
