= Clinchamp =

- Commune
- Location of Clinchamp
- Location within France Location within Grand Est
- Coordinates: 48°11′34″N 5°27′31″E
- Country: France
- Region: Grand Est
- Department: Haute-Marne
- Arrondissement: Chaumont
- Canton: Poissons
- Intercommunality: Meuse Rognon

Government
  - Mayor (2023–2026): Philippe Faure
- Area^{1}: 16.07 km^{2} (6.20 sq mi)
- Elevation: 380 m (1,250 ft)
- Population (2023): 71
  - Density: 4.4/km^{2} (11/sq mi)
- Time zone: UTC+01:00 (CET)
  - Summer (DST): UTC+02:00 (CEST)
- INSEE/Postal code: 52133 /52700
- ^{1} French Land Register data, which excludes lakes, ponds, glaciers > 1 km^{2} (0.386 sq mi or 247 acres) and river estuaries.

Clinchamp (French pronunciation: [klɛ̃ʃɑ̃]) is a commune in the Haute-Marne department in north-eastern France.

== See also ==
- Communes of the Haute-Marne department
