= Arrondissement of Chaumont =

Coordinates: 48.12°N 5.13°E

Chaumont
- Arrondissement
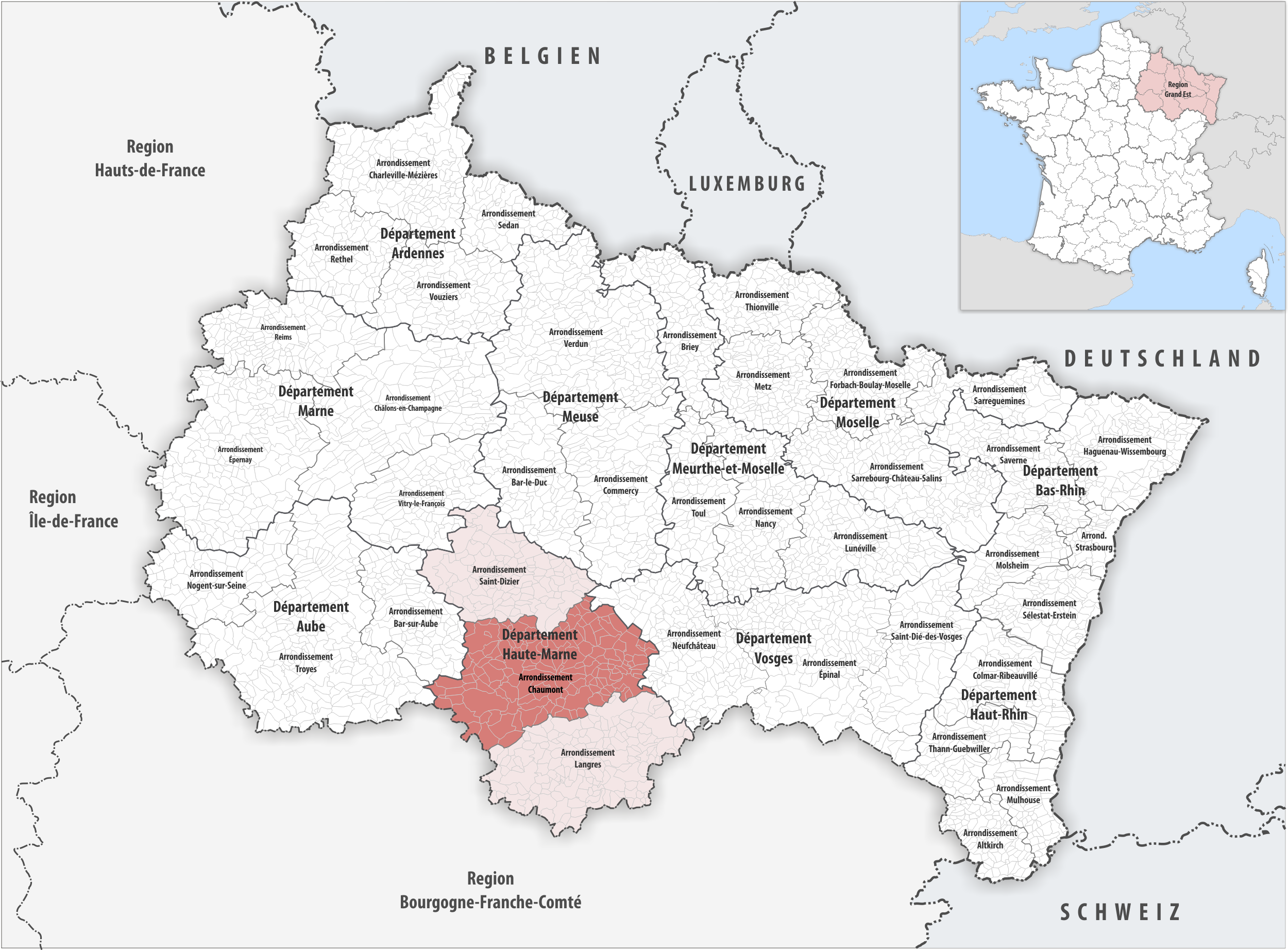
- Location within the region Grand Est
- Country: France
- Region: Grand Est
- Department: Haute-Marne
- No. of communes: {{{nbcomm}}}
- Area: 2,476.3 km^{2} (956.1 sq mi)
- Population (2023): 60,377
  - Density: 24.382/km^{2} (63.149/sq mi)
- INSEE code: 521

The Arrondissement of Chaumont (French pronunciation: [ʃomɔ̃]) is an arrondissement of France in the Haute-Marne department, Grand Est Region. It has 158 communes. Its population is 61,835 (2021), and its area is 2,476.3 km^{2} (956.1 sq mi).

== Composition ==
The communes of the arrondissement of Chaumont are:

1. Ageville
2. Aillianville
3. Aizanville
4. Andelot-Blancheville
5. Annéville-la-Prairie
6. Arc-en-Barrois
7. Aubepierre-sur-Aube
8. Audeloncourt
9. Autreville-sur-la-Renne
10. Bassoncourt
11. Biesles
12. Blaisy
13. Blessonville
14. Bologne
15. Bourdons-sur-Rognon
16. Bourg-Sainte-Marie
17. Bourmont-entre-Meuse-et-Mouzon
18. Brainville-sur-Meuse
19. Braux-le-Châtel
20. Brethenay
21. Breuvannes-en-Bassigny
22. Briaucourt
23. Bricon
24. Bugnières
25. Busson
26. Buxières-lès-Clefmont
27. Buxières-lès-Villiers
28. Chalvraines
29. Chamarandes-Choignes
30. Chambroncourt
31. Champigneulles-en-Bassigny
32. Chantraines
33. Châteauvillain
34. Chaumont
35. Chaumont-la-Ville
36. Choiseul
37. Cirey-lès-Mareilles
38. Cirfontaines-en-Azois
39. Clefmont
40. Clinchamp
41. Colombey-les-Deux-Églises
42. Condes
43. Consigny
44. Coupray
45. Cour-l'Évêque
46. Curmont
47. Cuves
48. Daillancourt
49. Daillecourt
50. Dancevoir
51. Darmannes
52. Dinteville
53. Doncourt-sur-Meuse
54. Ecot-la-Combe
55. Esnouveaux
56. Euffigneix
57. Forcey
58. Foulain
59. Froncles
60. La Genevroye
61. Germainvilliers
62. Giey-sur-Aujon
63. Gillancourt
64. Graffigny-Chemin
65. Guindrecourt-sur-Blaise
66. Hâcourt
67. Harréville-les-Chanteurs
68. Huilliécourt
69. Humberville
70. Illoud
71. Is-en-Bassigny
72. Jonchery
73. Juzennecourt
74. Lachapelle-en-Blaisy
75. Lafauche
76. Laferté-sur-Aube
77. Lamancine
78. Lanques-sur-Rognon
79. Lanty-sur-Aube
80. Latrecey-Ormoy-sur-Aube
81. Laville-aux-Bois
82. Lavilleneuve-au-Roi
83. Leffonds
84. Leurville
85. Levécourt
86. Liffol-le-Petit
87. Longchamp
88. Louvières
89. Luzy-sur-Marne
90. Maisoncelles
91. Malaincourt-sur-Meuse
92. Mandres-la-Côte
93. Manois
94. Maranville
95. Marbéville
96. Mareilles
97. Marnay-sur-Marne
98. Mennouveaux
99. Merrey
100. Meures
101. Millières
102. Mirbel
103. Montheries
104. Montot-sur-Rognon
105. Morionvilliers
106. Neuilly-sur-Suize
107. Ninville
108. Nogent
109. Noyers
110. Orges
111. Ormoy-lès-Sexfontaines
112. Orquevaux
113. Oudincourt
114. Outremécourt
115. Ozières
116. Perrusse
117. Poinson-lès-Nogent
118. Pont-la-Ville
119. Poulangy
120. Prez-sous-Lafauche
121. Rangecourt
122. Rennepont
123. Reynel
124. Riaucourt
125. Richebourg
126. Rimaucourt
127. Rizaucourt-Buchey
128. Rochefort-sur-la-Côte
129. Romain-sur-Meuse
130. Saint-Blin
131. Saint-Thiébault
132. Sarcey
133. Semilly
134. Semoutiers-Montsaon
135. Sexfontaines
136. Signéville
137. Silvarouvres
138. Sommerécourt
139. Soncourt-sur-Marne
140. Soulaucourt-sur-Mouzon
141. Thivet
142. Thol-lès-Millières
143. Treix
144. Vaudrecourt
145. Vaudrémont
146. Verbiesles
147. Vesaignes-sous-Lafauche
148. Vesaignes-sur-Marne
149. Viéville
150. Vignes-la-Côte
151. Vignory
152. Villars-en-Azois
153. Villiers-le-Sec
154. Villiers-sur-Suize
155. Vitry-lès-Nogent
156. Vouécourt
157. Vraincourt
158. Vroncourt-la-Côte

== History ==
The arrondissement of Chaumont was created in 1800.

As a result of the reorganisation of the cantons of France which came into effect in 2015, the borders of the cantons are no longer related to the borders of the arrondissements. The cantons of the arrondissement of Chaumont were, as of January 2015:

1. Andelot-Blancheville
2. Arc-en-Barrois
3. Bourmont
4. Châteauvillain
5. Chaumont-Nord
6. Chaumont-Sud
7. Clefmont
8. Juzennecourt
9. Nogent
10. Saint-Blin
11. Vignory
