= Poissons =

- Commune
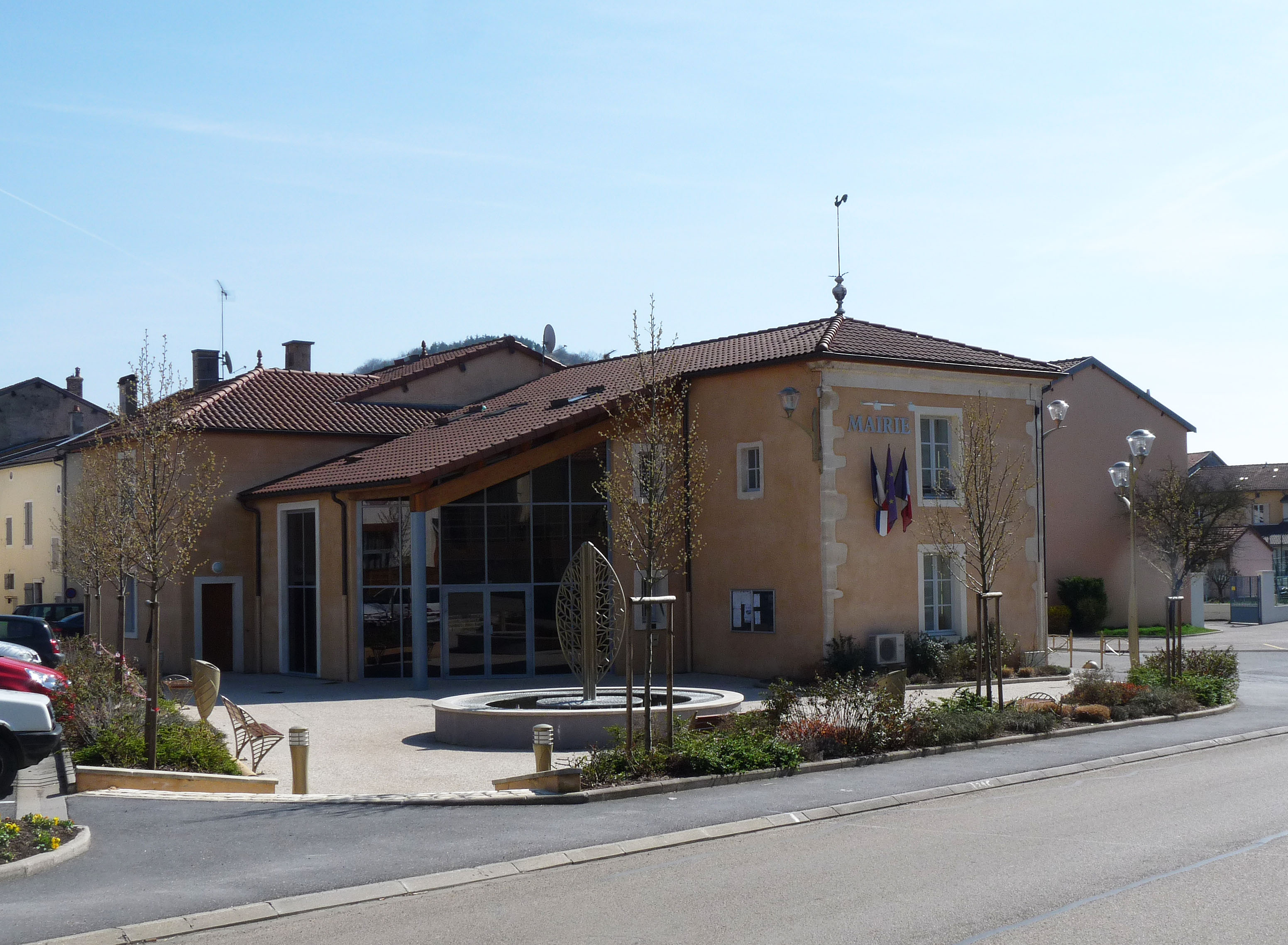
- The town hall in Poissons

- Coat of arms
- Location of Poissons
- Location within France Location within Grand Est
- Coordinates: 48°25′26″N 5°13′14″E
- Country: France
- Region: Grand Est
- Department: Haute-Marne
- Arrondissement: Saint-Dizier
- Canton: Poissons

Government
  - Mayor (2020–2026): Bernard Adam
- Area^{1}: 15.48 km^{2} (5.98 sq mi)
- Elevation: 230 m (750 ft)
- Highest elevation: 390 m (1,280 ft)
- Lowest elevation: 202 m (663 ft)
- Population (2023): 618
  - Density: 39.9/km^{2} (103/sq mi)
- Time zone: UTC+01:00 (CET)
  - Summer (DST): UTC+02:00 (CEST)
- INSEE/Postal code: 52398 /52230
- ^{1} French Land Register data, which excludes lakes, ponds, glaciers > 1 km^{2} (0.386 sq mi or 247 acres) and river estuaries.

Poissons (French pronunciation: [pwasɔ̃]) is a commune in the Haute-Marne department in north-eastern France.

== Demographics ==
Historical population
Year	Pop.	±% p.a.
1968	732	—
1975	720	−0.24%
1982	747	+0.53%
1990	732	−0.25%
1999	747	+0.23%
2007	732	−0.25%
2012	719	−0.36%
2017	667	−1.49%
2023	618	−1.26%
Source: INSEE

== See also ==
- Communes of the Haute-Marne department
