= Semilly =

- Commune
- Coat of arms
- Location of Semilly
- Location within France Location within Grand Est
- Coordinates: 48°15′35″N 5°27′33″E
- Country: France
- Region: Grand Est
- Department: Haute-Marne
- Arrondissement: Chaumont
- Canton: Poissons

Government
  - Mayor (2020–2026): Christophe Rogi
- Area^{1}: 14.6 km^{2} (5.6 sq mi)
- Elevation: 291 m (955 ft)
- Population (2023): 94
  - Density: 6.4/km^{2} (17/sq mi)
- Time zone: UTC+01:00 (CET)
  - Summer (DST): UTC+02:00 (CEST)
- INSEE/Postal code: 52468 /52700
- ^{1} French Land Register data, which excludes lakes, ponds, glaciers > 1 km^{2} (0.386 sq mi or 247 acres) and river estuaries.

Semilly (French pronunciation: [səmiji]) is a commune in the Haute-Marne department in north-eastern France.

== See also ==
- Communes of the Haute-Marne department
