= Brainville-sur-Meuse =

- Commune
- Location of Brainville-sur-Meuse
- Location within France Location within Grand Est
- Coordinates: 48°10′44″N 5°35′11″E
- Country: France
- Region: Grand Est
- Department: Haute-Marne
- Arrondissement: Chaumont
- Canton: Poissons

Government
  - Mayor (2020–2026): Emmanuel Rouyer
- Area^{1}: 5.93 km^{2} (2.29 sq mi)
- Elevation: 300 m (980 ft)
- Population (2023): 69
  - Density: 12/km^{2} (30/sq mi)
- Time zone: UTC+01:00 (CET)
  - Summer (DST): UTC+02:00 (CEST)
- INSEE/Postal code: 52067 /52150
- ^{1} French Land Register data, which excludes lakes, ponds, glaciers > 1 km^{2} (0.386 sq mi or 247 acres) and river estuaries.

Brainville-sur-Meuse (French pronunciation: [bʁɛ̃vil syʁ møz], literally Brainville on Meuse) is a commune in the Haute-Marne department in northeastern France.

== Population ==
Historical population
Year	Pop.	±% p.a.
1968	165	—
1975	147	−1.64%
1982	125	−2.29%
1990	108	−1.81%
1999	81	−3.15%
2007	81	+0.00%
2012	84	+0.73%
2017	78	−1.47%
2023	69	−2.02%
Source: INSEE

== See also ==
- Communes of the Haute-Marne department
