= Doncourt-sur-Meuse =

- Commune
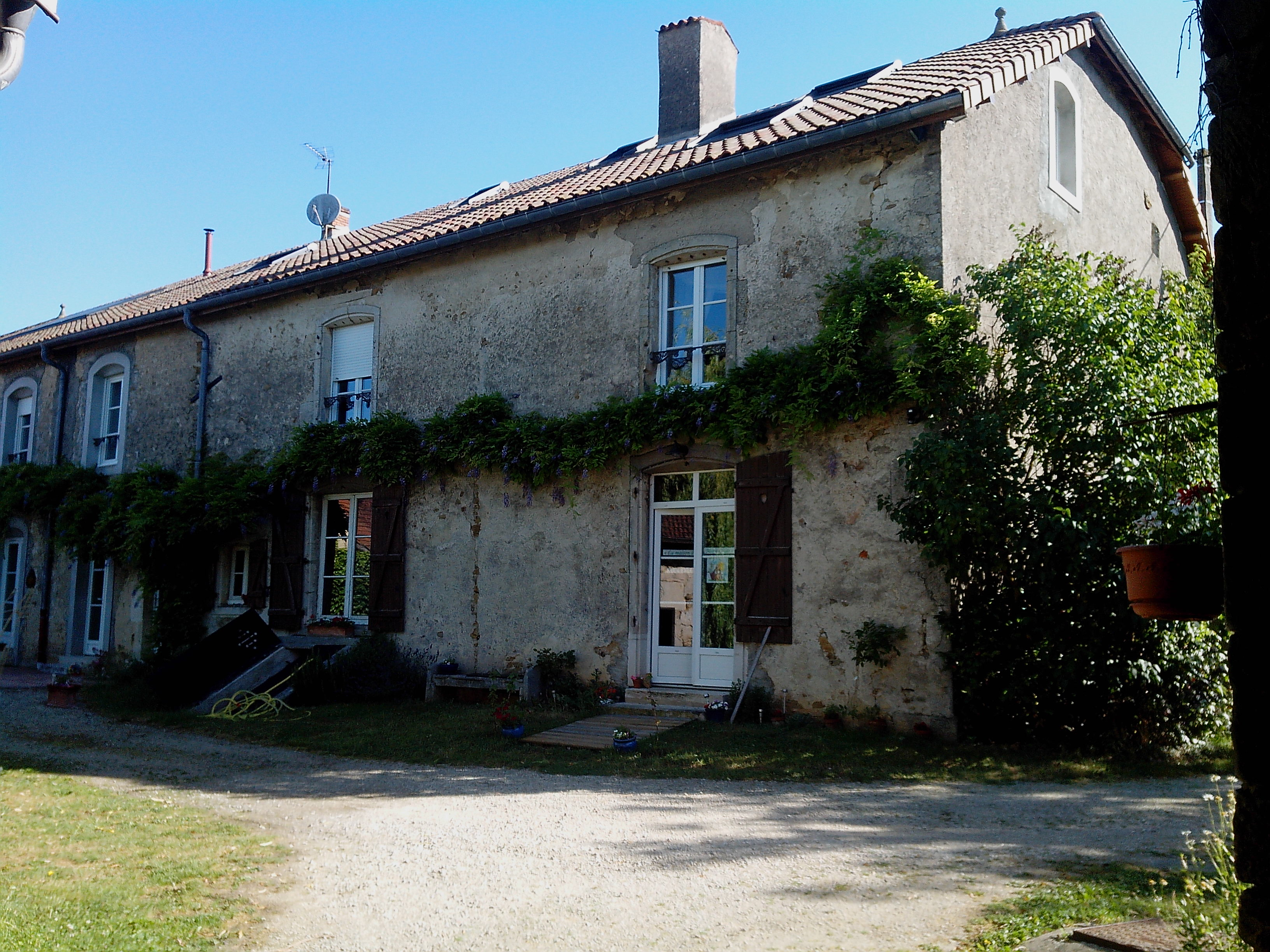
- The house of Marie-Clair in Doncourt-sur-Meuse
- Location of Doncourt-sur-Meuse
- Location within France Location within Grand Est
- Coordinates: 48°08′57″N 5°34′23″E
- Country: France
- Region: Grand Est
- Department: Haute-Marne
- Arrondissement: Chaumont
- Canton: Poissons
- Intercommunality: Meuse Rognon

Government
  - Mayor (2020–2026): Dominique Rondot
- Area^{1}: 5.93 km^{2} (2.29 sq mi)
- Elevation: 322 m (1,056 ft)
- Population (2023): 40
  - Density: 6.7/km^{2} (17/sq mi)
- Time zone: UTC+01:00 (CET)
  - Summer (DST): UTC+02:00 (CEST)
- INSEE/Postal code: 52174 /52150
- ^{1} French Land Register data, which excludes lakes, ponds, glaciers > 1 km^{2} (0.386 sq mi or 247 acres) and river estuaries.

Doncourt-sur-Meuse (French pronunciation: [dɔ̃kuʁ syʁ møz], literally Doncourt on Meuse) is a commune in the Haute-Marne department in north-eastern France.

== See also ==
- Communes of the Haute-Marne department
