= Germisay =

- Commune
- Location of Germisay
- Location within France Location within Grand Est
- Coordinates: 48°23′55″N 5°21′28″E
- Country: France
- Region: Grand Est
- Department: Haute-Marne
- Arrondissement: Saint-Dizier
- Canton: Poissons

Government
  - Mayor (2020–2026): Amandine Fournier
- Area^{1}: 6.73 km^{2} (2.60 sq mi)
- Elevation: 376 m (1,234 ft)
- Highest elevation: 421 m (1,381 ft)
- Lowest elevation: 335 m (1,099 ft)
- Population (2023): 17
  - Density: 2.5/km^{2} (6.5/sq mi)
- Time zone: UTC+01:00 (CET)
  - Summer (DST): UTC+02:00 (CEST)
- INSEE/Postal code: 52219 /52230
- ^{1} French Land Register data, which excludes lakes, ponds, glaciers > 1 km^{2} (0.386 sq mi or 247 acres) and river estuaries.

Germisay (French pronunciation: [ʒɛʁmizɛ]) is a commune in the Haute-Marne department in north-eastern France.

== See also ==
- Communes of the Haute-Marne department
