= Harréville-les-Chanteurs =

- Commune
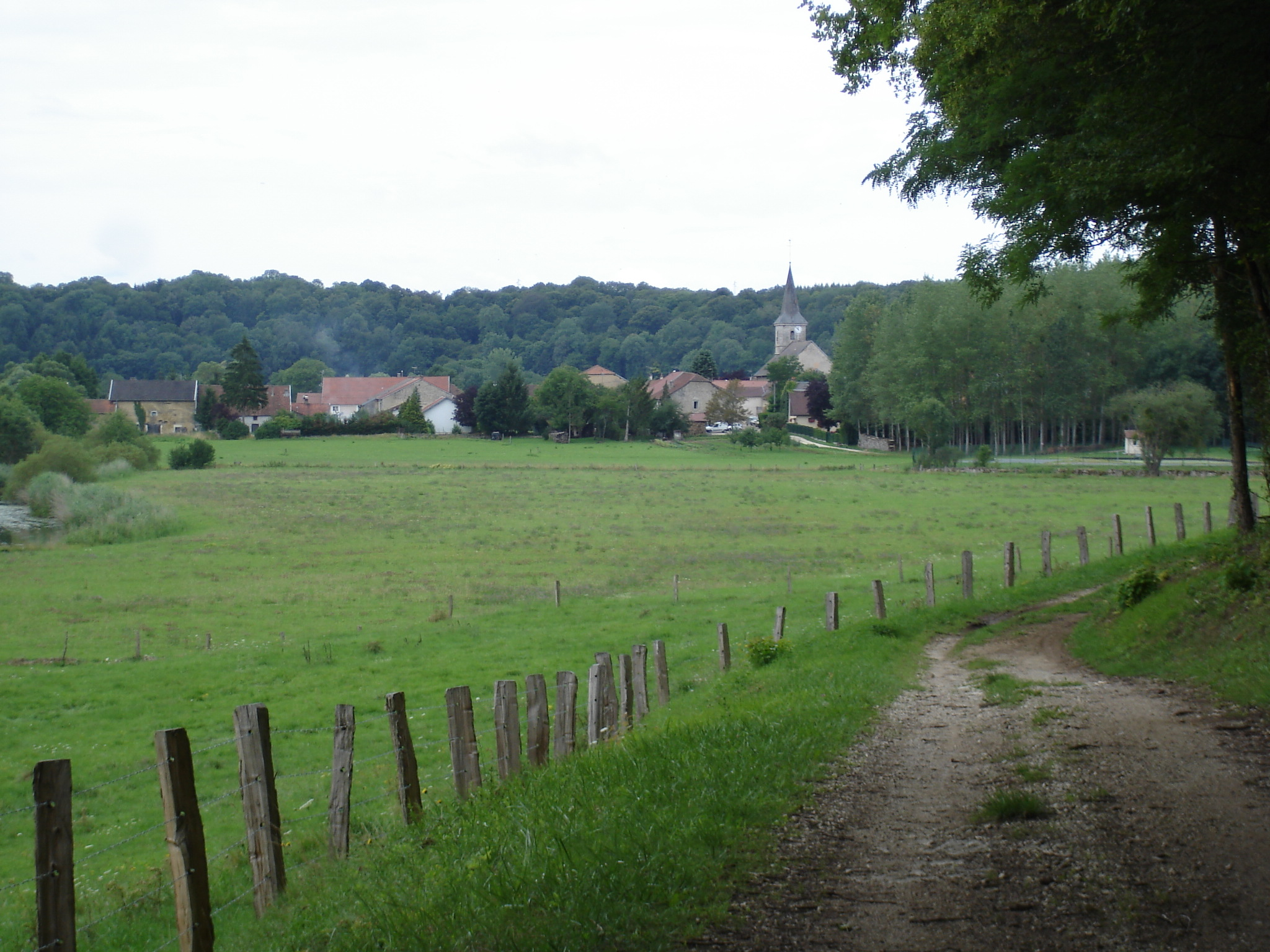
- A general view of Harréville-les-Chanteurs

- Coat of arms
- Location of Harréville-les-Chanteurs
- Location within France Location within Grand Est
- Coordinates: 48°15′56″N 5°37′52″E
- Country: France
- Region: Grand Est
- Department: Haute-Marne
- Arrondissement: Chaumont
- Canton: Poissons
- Intercommunality: Meuse Rognon

Government
  - Mayor (2020–2026): Pierre-Jean Lambert
- Area^{1}: 15.76 km^{2} (6.08 sq mi)
- Elevation: 310 m (1,020 ft)
- Population (2023): 259
  - Density: 16.4/km^{2} (42.6/sq mi)
- Time zone: UTC+01:00 (CET)
  - Summer (DST): UTC+02:00 (CEST)
- INSEE/Postal code: 52237 /52150
- ^{1} French Land Register data, which excludes lakes, ponds, glaciers > 1 km^{2} (0.386 sq mi or 247 acres) and river estuaries.

Harréville-les-Chanteurs (French pronunciation: [aʁevil le ʃɑ̃tœʁ]) is a commune in the Haute-Marne department in north-eastern France.

== See also ==
- Communes of the Haute-Marne department
