= Romain-sur-Meuse =

- Commune
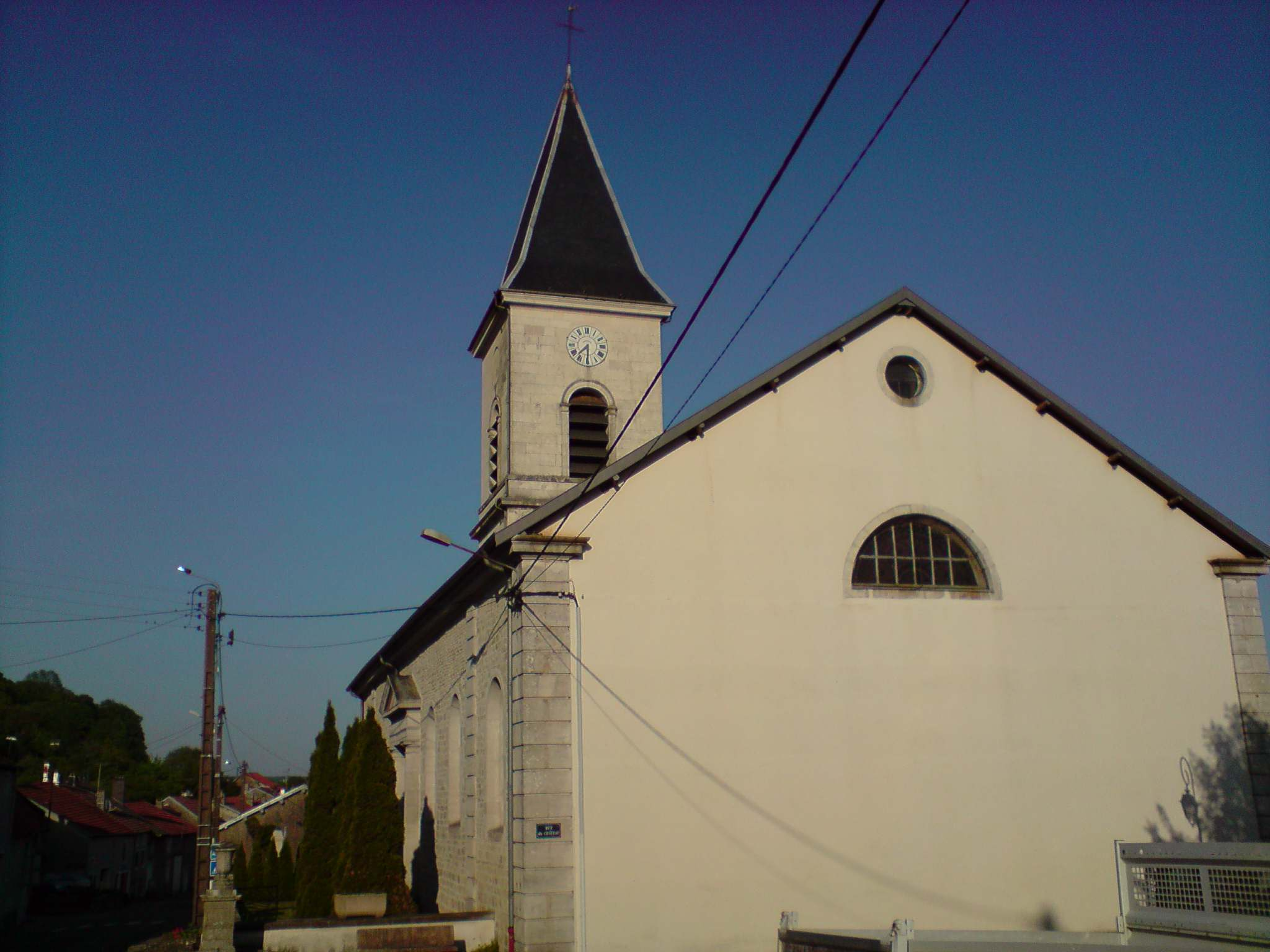
- The church in Romain-sur-Meuse
- Location of Romain-sur-Meuse
- Location within France Location within Grand Est
- Coordinates: 48°10′25″N 5°32′05″E
- Country: France
- Region: Grand Est
- Department: Haute-Marne
- Arrondissement: Chaumont
- Canton: Poissons

Government
  - Mayor (2020–2026): Jean-Claude Klein
- Area^{1}: 16.44 km^{2} (6.35 sq mi)
- Highest elevation: 492 m (1,614 ft)
- Lowest elevation: 421 m (1,381 ft)
- Population (2023): 89
  - Density: 5.4/km^{2} (14/sq mi)
- Time zone: UTC+01:00 (CET)
  - Summer (DST): UTC+02:00 (CEST)
- INSEE/Postal code: 52433 /52150
- ^{1} French Land Register data, which excludes lakes, ponds, glaciers > 1 km^{2} (0.386 sq mi or 247 acres) and river estuaries.

Romain-sur-Meuse (French pronunciation: [ʁɔmɛ̃ syʁ møz], literally Romain on Meuse) is a commune in the Haute-Marne department in north-eastern France.

== See also ==
- Communes of the Haute-Marne department
