= Chalvraines =

- Commune
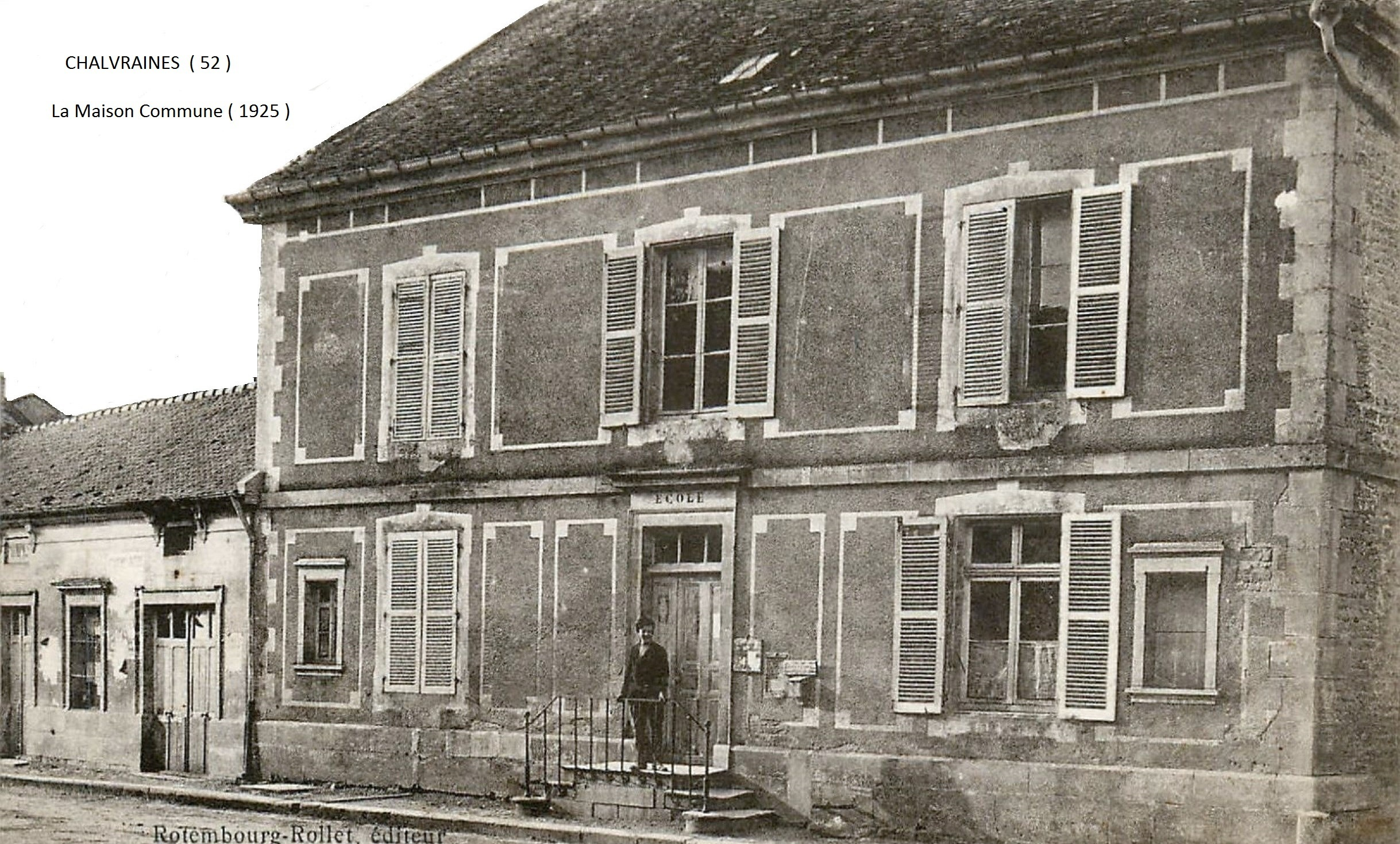
- Chalvraines Town hall
- Location of Chalvraines
- Location within France Location within Grand Est
- Coordinates: 48°14′30″N 5°28′46″E
- Country: France
- Region: Grand Est
- Department: Haute-Marne
- Arrondissement: Chaumont
- Canton: Poissons

Government
  - Mayor (2020–2026): Gérard Theodorides
- Area^{1}: 26.35 km^{2} (10.17 sq mi)
- Elevation: 386 m (1,266 ft)
- Population (2023): 191
  - Density: 7.25/km^{2} (18.8/sq mi)
- Time zone: UTC+01:00 (CET)
  - Summer (DST): UTC+02:00 (CEST)
- INSEE/Postal code: 52095 /52700
- ^{1} French Land Register data, which excludes lakes, ponds, glaciers > 1 km^{2} (0.386 sq mi or 247 acres) and river estuaries.

Chalvraines (French pronunciation: [ʃalvʁɛn]) is a commune in the Haute-Marne department in north-eastern France.

== See also ==
- Communes of the Haute-Marne department
