= Leurville =

- Commune
- Coat of arms
- Location of Leurville
- Location within France Location within Grand Est
- Coordinates: 48°19′46″N 5°23′05″E
- Country: France
- Region: Grand Est
- Department: Haute-Marne
- Arrondissement: Chaumont
- Canton: Poissons

Government
  - Mayor (2024–2026): Didier Chané
- Area^{1}: 10.44 km^{2} (4.03 sq mi)
- Elevation: 400 m (1,300 ft)
- Population (2023): 81
  - Density: 7.8/km^{2} (20/sq mi)
- Time zone: UTC+01:00 (CET)
  - Summer (DST): UTC+02:00 (CEST)
- INSEE/Postal code: 52286 /52700
- ^{1} French Land Register data, which excludes lakes, ponds, glaciers > 1 km^{2} (0.386 sq mi or 247 acres) and river estuaries.

Leurville is a commune (municipality) in the Haute-Marne department in north-eastern France.

== See also ==
- Communes of the Haute-Marne department
