= Saint-Blin =

- Commune
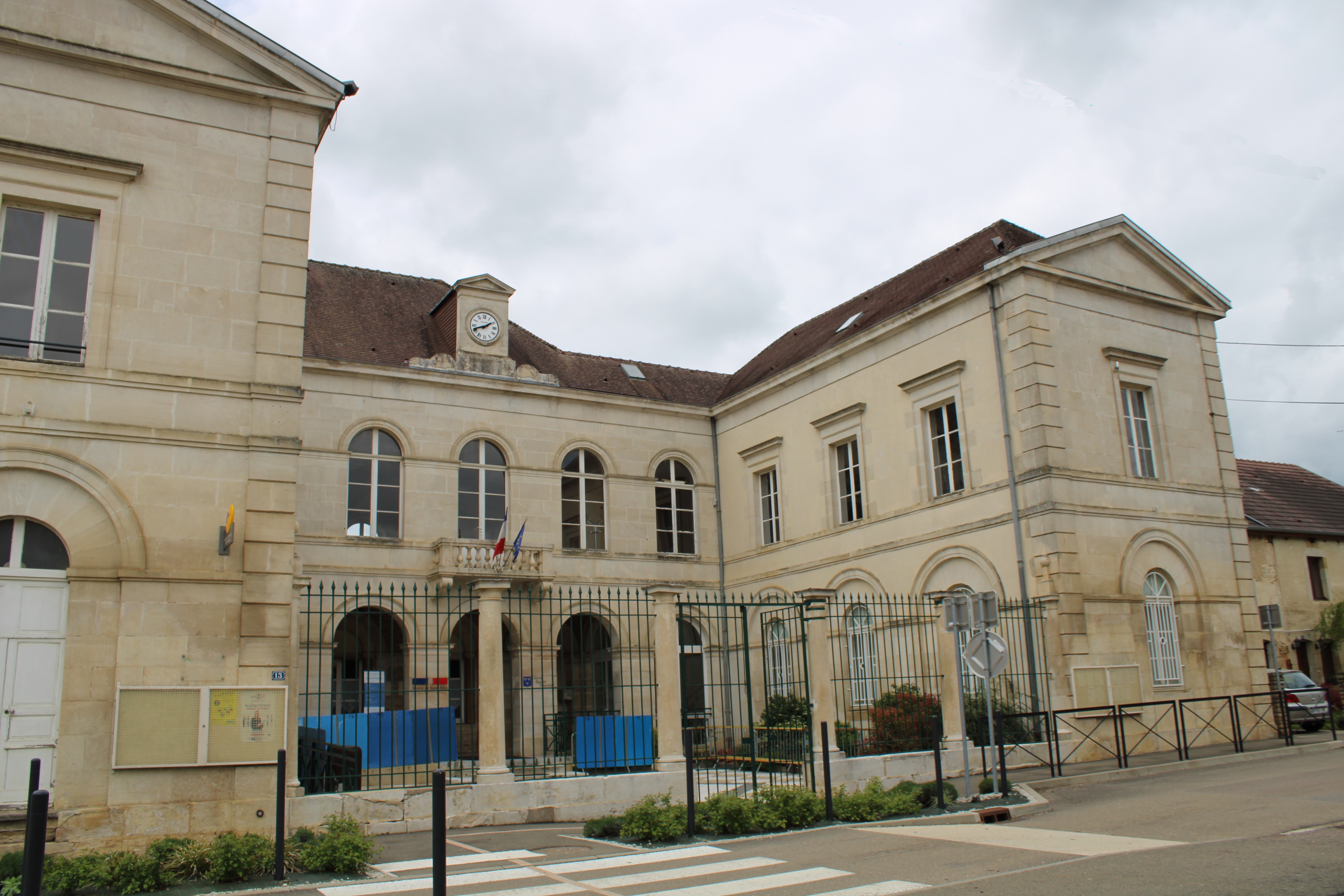
- The town hall in Saint-Blin

- Coat of arms
- Location of Saint-Blin
- Location within France Location within Grand Est
- Coordinates: 48°16′20″N 5°24′48″E
- Country: France
- Region: Grand Est
- Department: Haute-Marne
- Arrondissement: Chaumont
- Canton: Poissons

Government
  - Mayor (2020–2026): Bernard Guy
- Area^{1}: 22.33 km^{2} (8.62 sq mi)
- Elevation: 291 m (955 ft)
- Population (2023): 337
  - Density: 15.1/km^{2} (39.1/sq mi)
- Time zone: UTC+01:00 (CET)
  - Summer (DST): UTC+02:00 (CEST)
- INSEE/Postal code: 52444 /52700
- ^{1} French Land Register data, which excludes lakes, ponds, glaciers > 1 km^{2} (0.386 sq mi or 247 acres) and river estuaries.

Saint-Blin (French pronunciation: [sɛ̃ blɛ̃]) is a commune in the Haute-Marne department in north-eastern France.

== See also ==
- Communes of the Haute-Marne department
