= Merrey =

- Commune
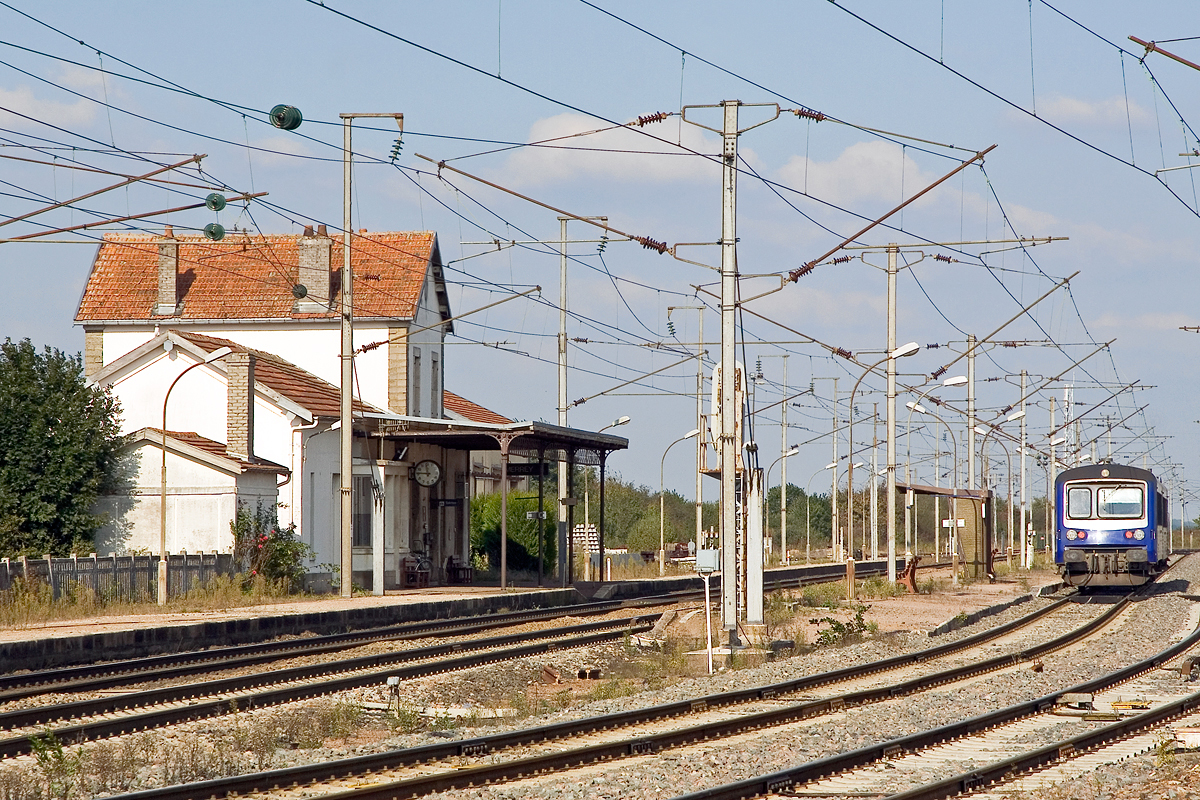
- The railway station in Merrey
- Location of Merrey
- Location within France Location within Grand Est
- Coordinates: 48°03′19″N 5°35′30″E
- Country: France
- Region: Grand Est
- Department: Haute-Marne
- Arrondissement: Chaumont
- Canton: Poissons

Government
  - Mayor (2020–2026): Jean-Pierre Emprin
- Area^{1}: 6.84 km^{2} (2.64 sq mi)
- Elevation: 365 m (1,198 ft)
- Highest elevation: 421 m (1,381 ft)
- Lowest elevation: 338 m (1,109 ft)
- Population (2023): 93
  - Density: 14/km^{2} (35/sq mi)
- Time zone: UTC+01:00 (CET)
  - Summer (DST): UTC+02:00 (CEST)
- INSEE/Postal code: 52320 /52240
- ^{1} French Land Register data, which excludes lakes, ponds, glaciers > 1 km^{2} (0.386 sq mi or 247 acres) and river estuaries.

Merrey (French pronunciation: [meʁɛ]) is a commune in the Haute-Marne department in north-eastern France.

== See also ==
- Communes of the Haute-Marne department
