= Maisoncelles, Haute-Marne =

Maisoncelles
- Commune
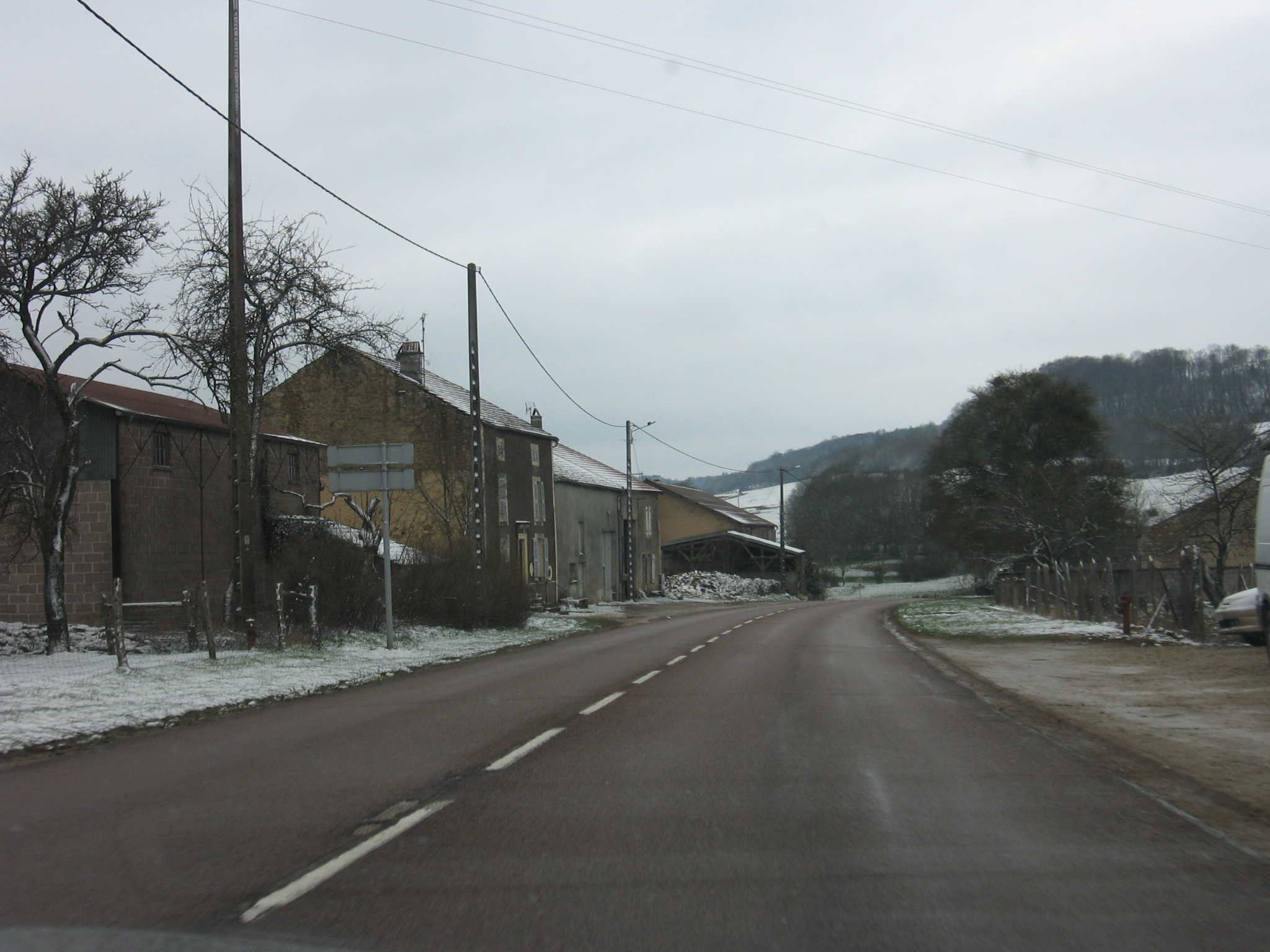
- A view within Maisoncelles
- Location of Maisoncelles
- Location within France Location within Grand Est
- Coordinates: 48°07′59″N 5°31′46″E
- Country: France
- Region: Grand Est
- Department: Haute-Marne
- Arrondissement: Chaumont
- Canton: Poissons

Government
  - Mayor (2020–2026): Patrice Crétineau
- Area^{1}: 4.2 km^{2} (1.6 sq mi)
- Elevation: 360 m (1,180 ft)
- Population (2023): 53
  - Density: 13/km^{2} (33/sq mi)
- Time zone: UTC+01:00 (CET)
  - Summer (DST): UTC+02:00 (CEST)
- INSEE/Postal code: 52301 /52240
- ^{1} French Land Register data, which excludes lakes, ponds, glaciers > 1 km^{2} (0.386 sq mi or 247 acres) and river estuaries.

Maisoncelles (French pronunciation: [mɛzɔ̃sɛl]) is a commune in the Haute-Marne department in north-eastern France.

== See also ==
- Communes of the Haute-Marne department
