= Paroy-sur-Saulx =

- Commune
- Location of Paroy-sur-Saulx
- Location within France Location within Grand Est
- Coordinates: 48°30′49″N 5°15′27″E
- Country: France
- Region: Grand Est
- Department: Haute-Marne
- Arrondissement: Saint-Dizier
- Canton: Poissons

Government
  - Mayor (2024–2026): Gilbert Depardieu
- Area^{1}: 7.47 km^{2} (2.88 sq mi)
- Elevation: 283 m (928 ft)
- Highest elevation: 376 m (1,234 ft)
- Lowest elevation: 277 m (909 ft)
- Population (2023): 43
  - Density: 5.8/km^{2} (15/sq mi)
- Time zone: UTC+01:00 (CET)
  - Summer (DST): UTC+02:00 (CEST)
- INSEE/Postal code: 52378 /52300
- ^{1} French Land Register data, which excludes lakes, ponds, glaciers > 1 km^{2} (0.386 sq mi or 247 acres) and river estuaries.

Paroy-sur-Saulx (French pronunciation: [paʁwa syʁ so], literally Paroy on Saulx) is a commune in the Haute-Marne department in north-eastern France. It is located about 35 km south east of Saint-Dizier.

== See also ==
- Communes of the Haute-Marne department
