= Morionvilliers =

- Commune
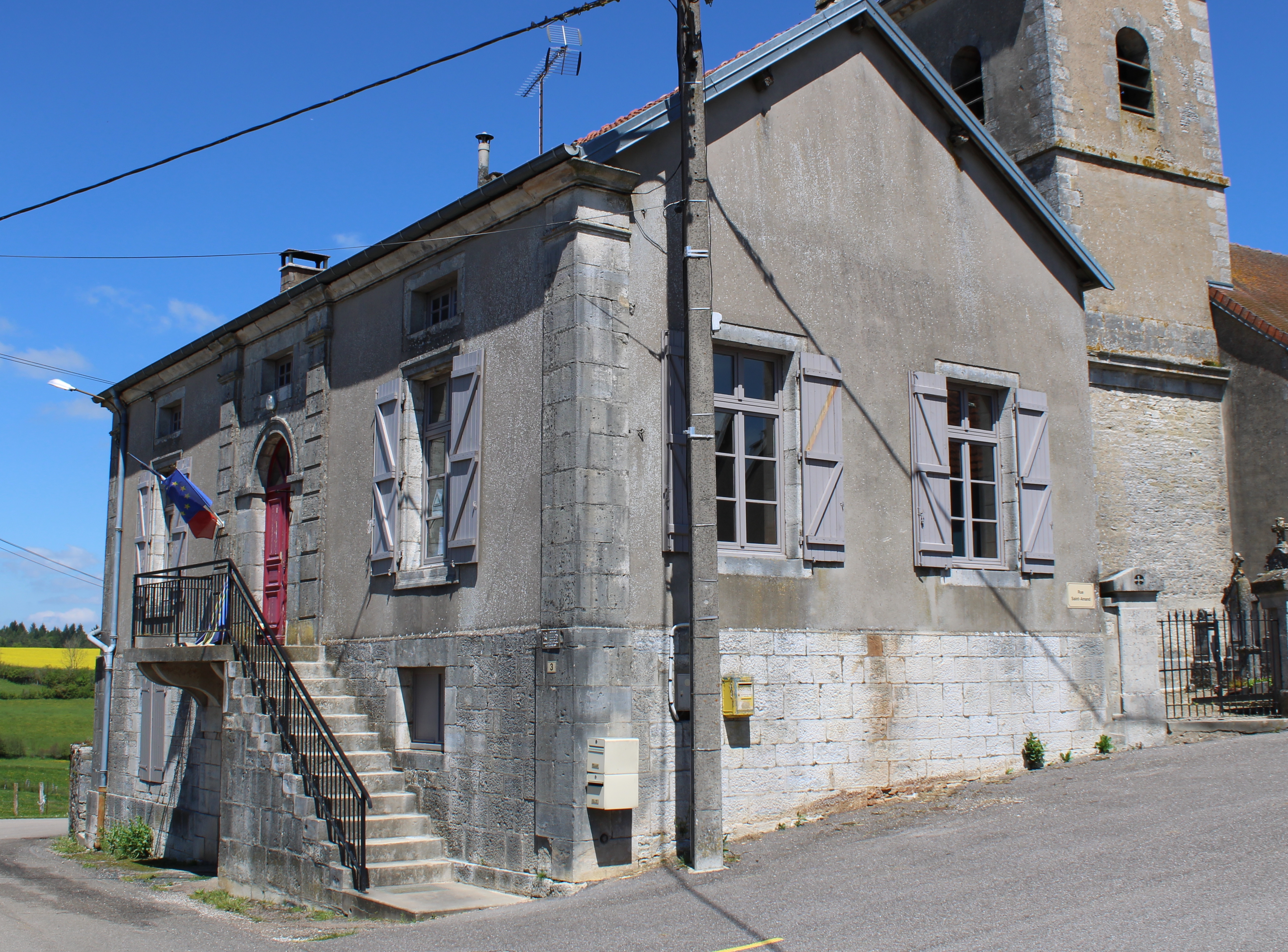
- The town hall in Morionvilliers
- Location of Morionvilliers
- Location within France Location within Grand Est
- Coordinates: 48°22′12″N 5°24′50″E
- Country: France
- Region: Grand Est
- Department: Haute-Marne
- Arrondissement: Chaumont
- Canton: Poissons
- Intercommunality: CC Bassin de Joinville en Champagne
- Area^{1}: 6.88 km^{2} (2.66 sq mi)
- Elevation: 370 m (1,210 ft)
- Population (2023): 24
  - Density: 3.5/km^{2} (9.0/sq mi)
- Time zone: UTC+01:00 (CET)
  - Summer (DST): UTC+02:00 (CEST)
- INSEE/Postal code: 52342 /52700
- ^{1} French Land Register data, which excludes lakes, ponds, glaciers > 1 km^{2} (0.386 sq mi or 247 acres) and river estuaries.

Morionvilliers (French pronunciation: [mɔʁjɔ̃vilje]) is a commune in the Haute-Marne department in north-eastern France. Marcel Humblot, mayor since 1965, died on 23 March 2026 at age 87, one week after being re-elected in the first round of the 2026 French municipal elections.

== See also ==
- Communes of the Haute-Marne department
