= Longchamp, Haute-Marne =

Longchamp
- Commune
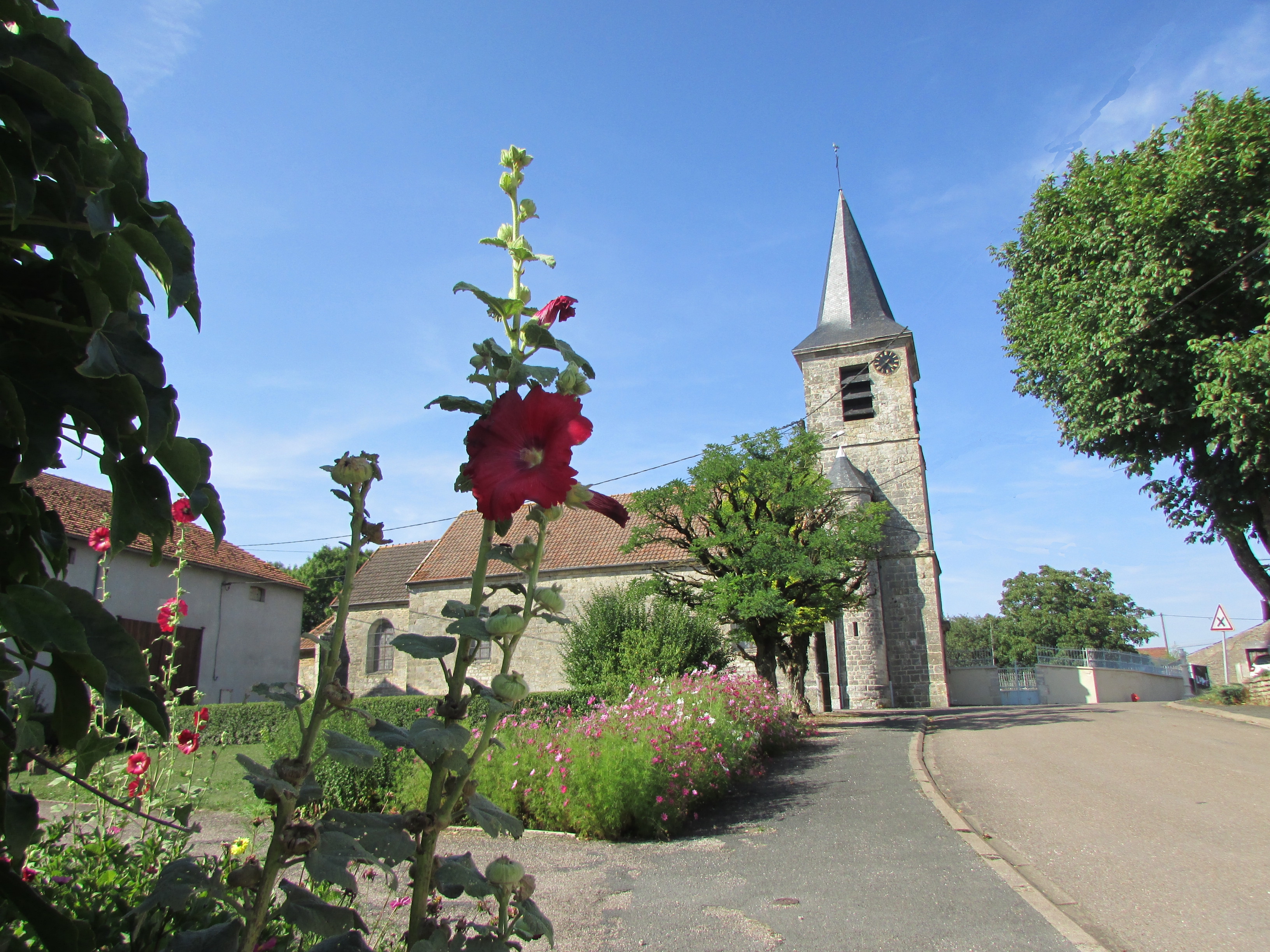
- The church in Longchamp
- Location of Longchamp
- Location within France Location within Grand Est
- Coordinates: 48°07′44″N 5°26′27″E
- Country: France
- Region: Grand Est
- Department: Haute-Marne
- Arrondissement: Chaumont
- Canton: Poissons

Government
  - Mayor (2020–2026): Anne-Claire Bourcelot
- Area^{1}: 6.11 km^{2} (2.36 sq mi)
- Elevation: 453 m (1,486 ft)
- Population (2023): 59
  - Density: 9.7/km^{2} (25/sq mi)
- Time zone: UTC+01:00 (CET)
  - Summer (DST): UTC+02:00 (CEST)
- INSEE/Postal code: 52291 /52240
- ^{1} French Land Register data, which excludes lakes, ponds, glaciers > 1 km^{2} (0.386 sq mi or 247 acres) and river estuaries.

Longchamp (French pronunciation: [lɔ̃ʃɑ̃]) is a commune in the Haute-Marne department in north-eastern France.

== See also ==
- Communes of the Haute-Marne department
