= Humberville =

- Commune
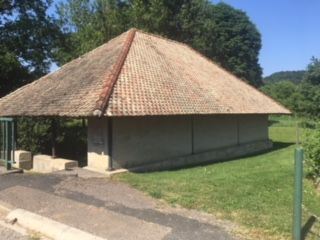
- The wash house in Humberville
- Location of Humberville
- Location within France Location within Grand Est
- Coordinates: 48°17′09″N 5°22′46″E
- Country: France
- Region: Grand Est
- Department: Haute-Marne
- Arrondissement: Chaumont
- Canton: Poissons

Government
  - Mayor (2020–2026): Thierry Mazelin
- Area^{1}: 6.44 km^{2} (2.49 sq mi)
- Elevation: 275 m (902 ft)
- Population (2023): 57
  - Density: 8.9/km^{2} (23/sq mi)
- Time zone: UTC+01:00 (CET)
  - Summer (DST): UTC+02:00 (CEST)
- INSEE/Postal code: 52245 /52700
- ^{1} French Land Register data, which excludes lakes, ponds, glaciers > 1 km^{2} (0.386 sq mi or 247 acres) and river estuaries.

Humberville (French pronunciation: [œ̃bɛʁvil]) is a commune in the Haute-Marne department in north-eastern France.

== See also ==
- Communes of the Haute-Marne department
