= Thonnance-les-Moulins =

- Commune
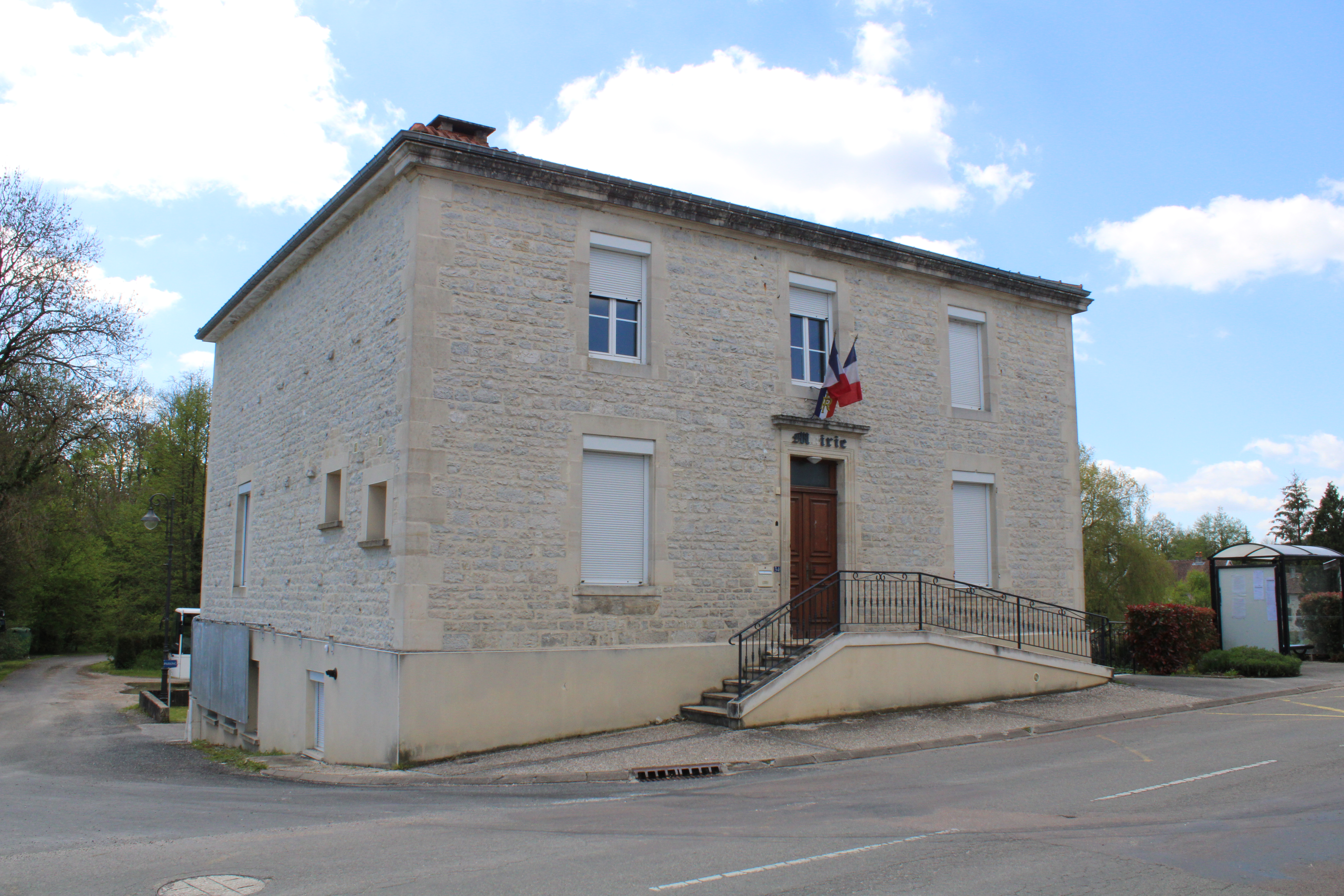
- The town hall in Thonnance-les-Moulins
- Location of Thonnance-les-Moulins
- Location within France Location within Grand Est
- Coordinates: 48°24′38″N 5°17′40″E
- Country: France
- Region: Grand Est
- Department: Haute-Marne
- Arrondissement: Saint-Dizier
- Canton: Poissons
- Intercommunality: Bassin de Joinville en Champagne

Government
  - Mayor (2020–2026): Lionel Français
- Area^{1}: 21.5 km^{2} (8.3 sq mi)
- Elevation: 282 m (925 ft)
- Highest elevation: 391 m (1,283 ft)
- Lowest elevation: 257 m (843 ft)
- Population (2023): 102
  - Density: 4.74/km^{2} (12.3/sq mi)
- Time zone: UTC+01:00 (CET)
  - Summer (DST): UTC+02:00 (CEST)
- INSEE/Postal code: 52491 /52230
- ^{1} French Land Register data, which excludes lakes, ponds, glaciers > 1 km^{2} (0.386 sq mi or 247 acres) and river estuaries.

Thonnance-les-Moulins (French pronunciation: [tɔnɑ̃s le mulɛ̃]) is a commune in the Haute-Marne department in north-eastern France. The current mayor is Lionel Français, re-elected in 2020. The town hall is located at 34 Grand'rue, 52230 Thonnance-les-Moulins.

== Population ==
As of 2021, the resident population of Thonnance-les-Moulins was 111.

== Key landmark ==
The Château de Brouthières was built in the 18th century. Part of the structure (façades and roofs of the château, and the dovecote) is listed as an historical monument.

== See also ==
- Communes of the Haute-Marne department
