= Lezéville =

- Commune
- Coat of arms
- Location of Lezéville
- Location within France Location within Grand Est
- Coordinates: 48°25′48″N 5°23′28″E
- Country: France
- Region: Grand Est
- Department: Haute-Marne
- Arrondissement: Saint-Dizier
- Canton: Poissons
- Intercommunality: Bassin de Joinville en Champagne

Government
  - Mayor (2020–2026): Damien Thieriot
- Area^{1}: 25.72 km^{2} (9.93 sq mi)
- Elevation: 372 m (1,220 ft)
- Highest elevation: 423 m (1,388 ft)
- Lowest elevation: 307 m (1,007 ft)
- Population (2023): 106
  - Density: 4.12/km^{2} (10.7/sq mi)
- Time zone: UTC+01:00 (CET)
  - Summer (DST): UTC+02:00 (CEST)
- INSEE/Postal code: 52288 /52230
- ^{1} French Land Register data, which excludes lakes, ponds, glaciers > 1 km^{2} (0.386 sq mi or 247 acres) and river estuaries.

Lezéville (French pronunciation: [ləzevil]) is a commune in the Haute-Marne department in north-eastern France.

== See also ==
- Communes of the Haute-Marne department
