= Effincourt =

- Commune
- Location of Effincourt
- Location within France Location within Grand Est
- Coordinates: 48°29′47″N 5°16′09″E
- Country: France
- Region: Grand Est
- Department: Haute-Marne
- Arrondissement: Saint-Dizier
- Canton: Poissons

Government
  - Mayor (2020–2026): Jean-François Varnier
- Area^{1}: 12.31 km^{2} (4.75 sq mi)
- Elevation: 293 m (961 ft)
- Highest elevation: 386 m (1,266 ft)
- Lowest elevation: 282 m (925 ft)
- Population (2023): 56
  - Density: 4.5/km^{2} (12/sq mi)
- Time zone: UTC+01:00 (CET)
  - Summer (DST): UTC+02:00 (CEST)
- INSEE/Postal code: 52184 /52300
- ^{1} French Land Register data, which excludes lakes, ponds, glaciers > 1 km^{2} (0.386 sq mi or 247 acres) and river estuaries.

Effincourt (French pronunciation: [efɛ̃kuʁ]) is a commune in the Haute-Marne department in north-eastern France.

== See also ==
- Communes of the Haute-Marne department
