= Chambroncourt =

- Commune
- Coat of arms
- Location of Chambroncourt
- Location within France Location within Grand Est
- Coordinates: 48°21′14″N 5°24′19″E
- Country: France
- Region: Grand Est
- Department: Haute-Marne
- Arrondissement: Chaumont
- Canton: Poissons

Government
  - Mayor (2022–2026): Michael Voilqué
- Area^{1}: 10.18 km^{2} (3.93 sq mi)
- Elevation: 376 m (1,234 ft)
- Population (2023): 48
  - Density: 4.7/km^{2} (12/sq mi)
- Time zone: UTC+01:00 (CET)
  - Summer (DST): UTC+02:00 (CEST)
- INSEE/Postal code: 52097 /52700
- ^{1} French Land Register data, which excludes lakes, ponds, glaciers > 1 km^{2} (0.386 sq mi or 247 acres) and river estuaries.

Chambroncourt (French pronunciation: [ʃɑ̃bʁɔ̃kuʁ]) is a commune in the Haute-Marne department in north-eastern France.

== See also ==
- Communes of the Haute-Marne department
