= Aingoulaincourt =

- Commune
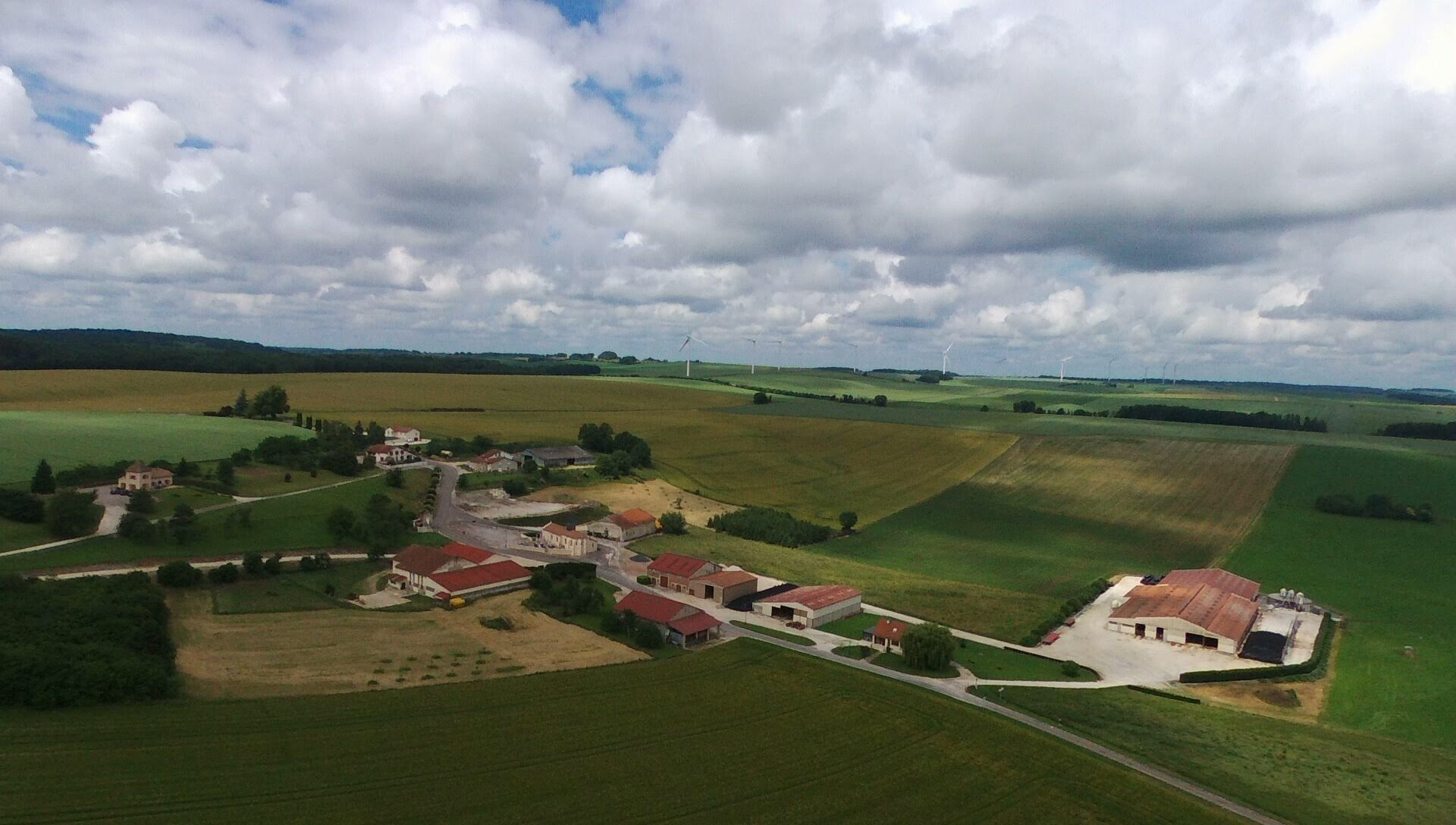
- A general view of Aingoulaincourt
- Location of Aingoulaincourt
- Location within France Location within Grand Est
- Coordinates: 48°27′22″N 5°17′10″E
- Country: France
- Region: Grand Est
- Department: Haute-Marne
- Arrondissement: Saint-Dizier
- Canton: Poissons
- Intercommunality: Bassin de Joinville en Champagne

Government
  - Mayor (2020–2026): Paul David
- Area^{1}: 5.1 km^{2} (2.0 sq mi)
- Elevation: 325 m (1,066 ft)
- Population (2023): 11
  - Density: 2.2/km^{2} (5.6/sq mi)
- Time zone: UTC+01:00 (CET)
  - Summer (DST): UTC+02:00 (CEST)
- INSEE/Postal code: 52004 /52230
- ^{1} French Land Register data, which excludes lakes, ponds, glaciers > 1 km^{2} (0.386 sq mi or 247 acres) and river estuaries.

Aingoulaincourt (French pronunciation: [ɛ̃ɡulɛ̃kuʁ]) is a commune in the Haute-Marne department in the Grand Est region in northeastern France.

== Population ==
Historical population
Year	Pop.	±% p.a.
1968	20	—
1975	18	−1.49%
1982	17	−0.81%
1990	17	+0.00%
1999	10	−5.73%
2007	12	+2.31%
2012	14	+3.13%
2017	13	−1.47%
2023	11	−2.75%
Source: INSEE

== See also ==
- Communes of the Haute-Marne department
