= Ozières =

- Commune
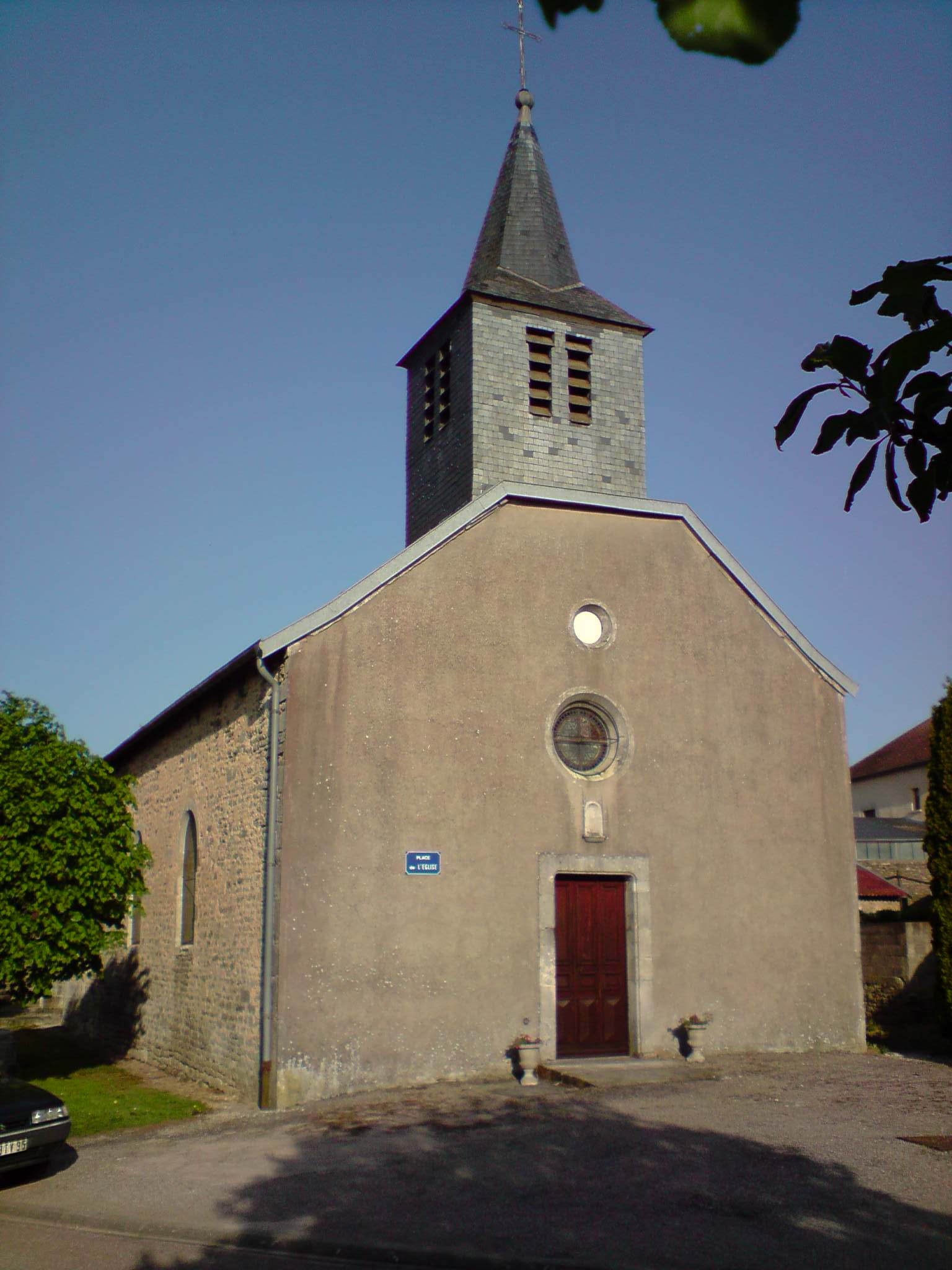
- The church in Ozières
- Location of Ozières
- Location within France Location within Grand Est
- Coordinates: 48°10′29″N 5°28′17″E
- Country: France
- Region: Grand Est
- Department: Haute-Marne
- Arrondissement: Chaumont
- Canton: Poissons

Government
  - Mayor (2020–2026): Eric Kims
- Area^{1}: 9.62 km^{2} (3.71 sq mi)
- Elevation: 418 m (1,371 ft)
- Population (2023): 34
  - Density: 3.5/km^{2} (9.2/sq mi)
- Time zone: UTC+01:00 (CET)
  - Summer (DST): UTC+02:00 (CEST)
- INSEE/Postal code: 52373 /52700
- ^{1} French Land Register data, which excludes lakes, ponds, glaciers > 1 km^{2} (0.386 sq mi or 247 acres) and river estuaries.

Ozières (French pronunciation: [ɔzjɛʁ]) is a commune in the Haute-Marne department in north-eastern France.

== See also ==
- Communes of the Haute-Marne department
