= Huilliécourt =

- Commune
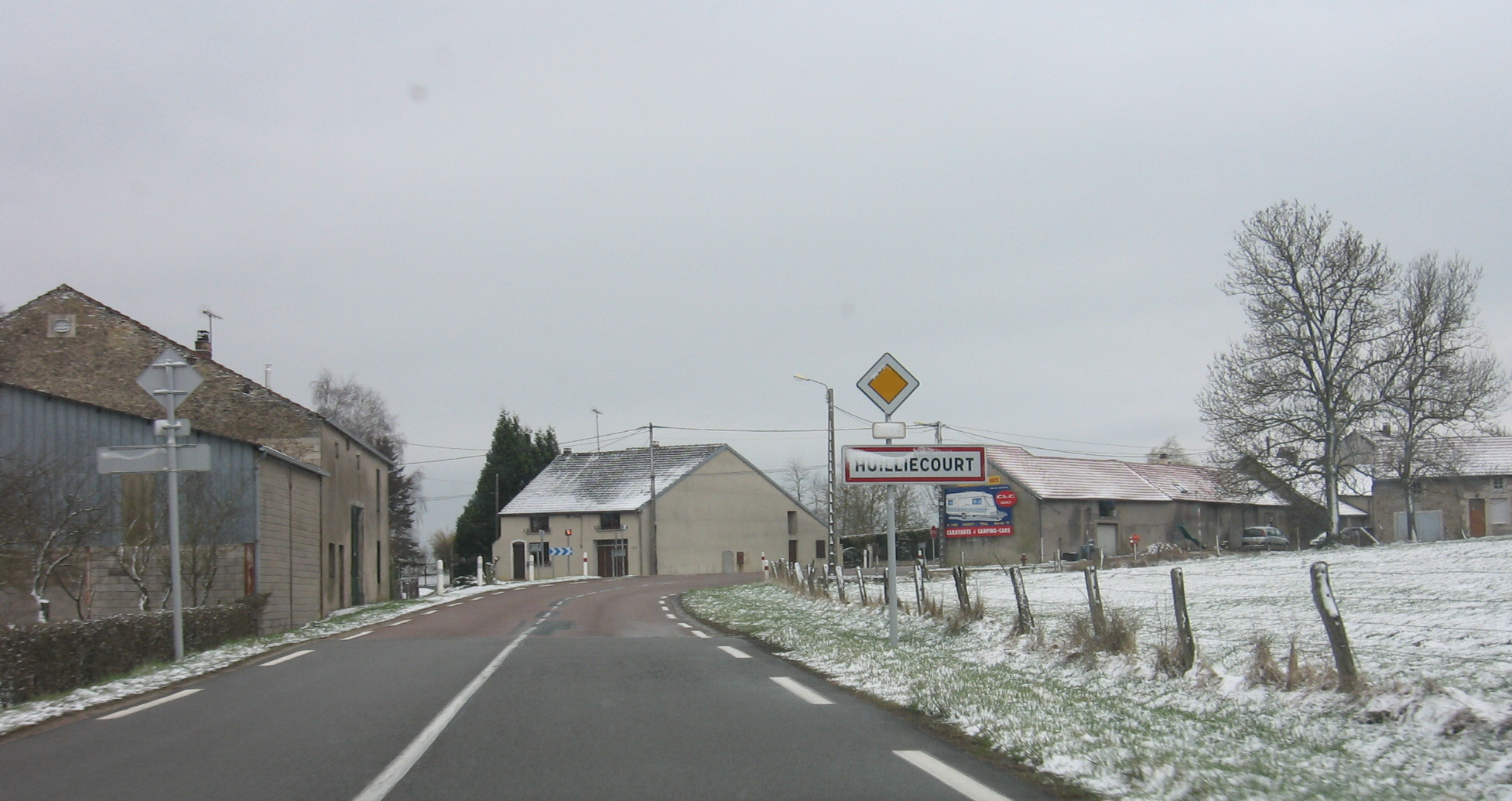
- The road into Huilliécourt
- Location of Huilliécourt
- Location within France Location within Grand Est
- Coordinates: 48°09′40″N 5°32′56″E
- Country: France
- Region: Grand Est
- Department: Haute-Marne
- Arrondissement: Chaumont
- Canton: Poissons

Government
  - Mayor (2020–2026): Marie-Claude Flammarion
- Area^{1}: 8.87 km^{2} (3.42 sq mi)
- Elevation: 350 m (1,150 ft)
- Population (2023): 107
  - Density: 12.1/km^{2} (31.2/sq mi)
- Time zone: UTC+01:00 (CET)
  - Summer (DST): UTC+02:00 (CEST)
- INSEE/Postal code: 52243 /52150
- ^{1} French Land Register data, which excludes lakes, ponds, glaciers > 1 km^{2} (0.386 sq mi or 247 acres) and river estuaries.

Huilliécourt is a commune in the Haute-Marne department in north-eastern France.

== See also ==
- Communes of the Haute-Marne department
