= Malaincourt-sur-Meuse =

- Commune
- Location of Malaincourt-sur-Meuse
- Location within France Location within Grand Est
- Coordinates: 48°09′15″N 5°35′55″E
- Country: France
- Region: Grand Est
- Department: Haute-Marne
- Arrondissement: Chaumont
- Canton: Poissons

Government
  - Mayor (2020–2026): Claude Roquis
- Area^{1}: 3.83 km^{2} (1.48 sq mi)
- Elevation: 345 m (1,132 ft)
- Population (2023): 47
  - Density: 12/km^{2} (32/sq mi)
- Time zone: UTC+01:00 (CET)
  - Summer (DST): UTC+02:00 (CEST)
- INSEE/Postal code: 52304 /52150
- ^{1} French Land Register data, which excludes lakes, ponds, glaciers > 1 km^{2} (0.386 sq mi or 247 acres) and river estuaries.

Malaincourt-sur-Meuse (French pronunciation: [malɛ̃kuʁ syʁ møz], literally Malaincourt on Meuse) is a commune in the Haute-Marne department in north-eastern France.

== See also ==
- Communes of the Haute-Marne department
