= Busson =

- Commune
- Location of Busson
- Location within France Location within Grand Est
- Coordinates: 48°19′38″N 5°21′37″E
- Country: France
- Region: Grand Est
- Department: Haute-Marne
- Arrondissement: Chaumont
- Canton: Poissons

Government
  - Mayor (2020–2026): Antony Cornot
- Area^{1}: 9.88 km^{2} (3.81 sq mi)
- Elevation: 385 m (1,263 ft)
- Population (2023): 44
  - Density: 4.5/km^{2} (12/sq mi)
- Time zone: UTC+01:00 (CET)
  - Summer (DST): UTC+02:00 (CEST)
- INSEE/Postal code: 52084 /52700
- ^{1} French Land Register data, which excludes lakes, ponds, glaciers > 1 km^{2} (0.386 sq mi or 247 acres) and river estuaries.

Busson is a commune in the Haute-Marne department in northeastern France.

== Climate ==
On average, Busson experiences 66.6 days per year with a minimum temperature below 0 °C (32.0 °F), 3.0 days per year with a minimum temperature below −10 °C (14.0 °F), 13.1 days per year with a maximum temperature below 0 °C (32.0 °F), and 9.4 days per year with a maximum temperature above 30 °C (86.0 °F). The record high temperature was 39.1 °C (102.4 °F) on July 25, 2019, while the record low temperature was −17.7 °C (0.1 °F) on January 5, 1995.

Climate data for Busson (1991–2020 normals, extremes 1992–present)
Month	Jan	Feb	Mar	Apr	May	Jun	Jul	Aug	Sep	Oct	Nov	Dec	Year
Record high °C (°F)	15.0 (59.0)	22.2 (72.0)	24.8 (76.6)	26.6 (79.9)	32.5 (90.5)	35.9 (96.6)	39.1 (102.4)	38.2 (100.8)	32.6 (90.7)	27.7 (81.9)	22.2 (72.0)	16.0 (60.8)	39.1 (102.4)
Mean daily maximum °C (°F)	4.5 (40.1)	6.1 (43.0)	10.4 (50.7)	14.5 (58.1)	18.5 (65.3)	22.3 (72.1)	24.6 (76.3)	24.1 (75.4)	19.5 (67.1)	14.4 (57.9)	8.5 (47.3)	5.2 (41.4)	14.4 (57.9)
Daily mean °C (°F)	2.0 (35.6)	2.9 (37.2)	6.1 (43.0)	9.3 (48.7)	13.1 (55.6)	16.5 (61.7)	18.7 (65.7)	18.6 (65.5)	14.7 (58.5)	10.7 (51.3)	5.8 (42.4)	2.9 (37.2)	10.1 (50.2)
Mean daily minimum °C (°F)	−0.4 (31.3)	−0.2 (31.6)	1.8 (35.2)	4.1 (39.4)	7.7 (45.9)	10.8 (51.4)	12.9 (55.2)	13.1 (55.6)	9.8 (49.6)	7.1 (44.8)	3.1 (37.6)	0.6 (33.1)	5.9 (42.6)
Record low °C (°F)	−17.7 (0.1)	−15.6 (3.9)	−17.6 (0.3)	−7.5 (18.5)	−2.4 (27.7)	0.1 (32.2)	3.9 (39.0)	3.4 (38.1)	0.8 (33.4)	−4.6 (23.7)	−12.1 (10.2)	−17.5 (0.5)	−17.7 (0.1)
Average precipitation mm (inches)	105.0 (4.13)	89.2 (3.51)	82.8 (3.26)	71.1 (2.80)	92.8 (3.65)	73.8 (2.91)	79.9 (3.15)	89.9 (3.54)	81.2 (3.20)	99.3 (3.91)	106.3 (4.19)	114.2 (4.50)	1,085.5 (42.75)
Average precipitation days (≥ 1.0 mm)	13.9	11.9	11.0	10.6	11.7	10.5	10.1	10.4	10.2	12.4	13.7	15.0	141.4
Source: Meteociel

== Population ==
Historical population
Year	Pop.	±% p.a.
1968	72	—
1975	54	−4.03%
1982	45	−2.57%
1990	42	−0.86%
1999	36	−1.70%
2007	41	+1.64%
2012	40	−0.49%
2017	39	−0.51%
2023	44	+2.03%
Source: INSEE

== See also ==
- Communes of the Haute-Marne department
