= Mennouveaux =

- Commune
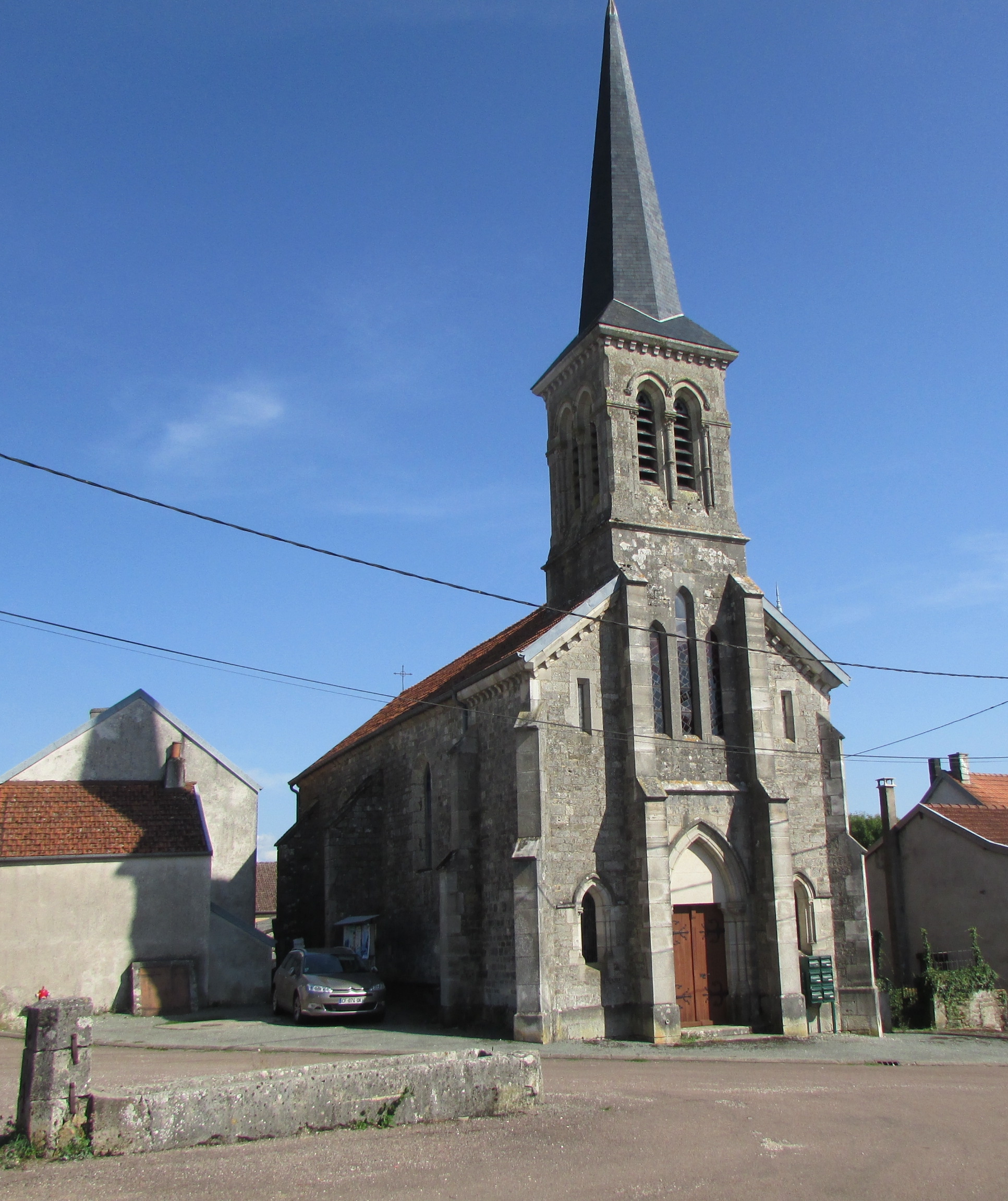
- The church in Mennouveaux
- Location of Mennouveaux
- Location within France Location within Grand Est
- Coordinates: 48°06′27″N 5°24′59″E
- Country: France
- Region: Grand Est
- Department: Haute-Marne
- Arrondissement: Chaumont
- Canton: Poissons

Government
  - Mayor (2020–2026): Daniel Renard
- Area^{1}: 7.8 km^{2} (3.0 sq mi)
- Elevation: 424 m (1,391 ft)
- Population (2023): 64
  - Density: 8.2/km^{2} (21/sq mi)
- Time zone: UTC+01:00 (CET)
  - Summer (DST): UTC+02:00 (CEST)
- INSEE/Postal code: 52319 /52240
- ^{1} French Land Register data, which excludes lakes, ponds, glaciers > 1 km^{2} (0.386 sq mi or 247 acres) and river estuaries.

Mennouveaux (French pronunciation: [mɛnuvo]) is a commune in the Haute-Marne department in north-eastern France.

== See also ==
- Communes of the Haute-Marne department
