= Épizon =

- Commune
- Location of Épizon
- Location within France Location within Grand Est
- Coordinates: 48°22′46″N 5°21′01″E
- Country: France
- Region: Grand Est
- Department: Haute-Marne
- Arrondissement: Saint-Dizier
- Canton: Poissons
- Intercommunality: Bassin de Joinville en Champagne

Government
  - Mayor (2020–2026): Claude Malingre
- Area^{1}: 37.53 km^{2} (14.49 sq mi)
- Elevation: 367 m (1,204 ft)
- Highest elevation: 422 m (1,385 ft)
- Lowest elevation: 252 m (827 ft)
- Population (2023): 153
  - Density: 4.08/km^{2} (10.6/sq mi)
- Time zone: UTC+01:00 (CET)
  - Summer (DST): UTC+02:00 (CEST)
- INSEE/Postal code: 52187 /52230
- ^{1} French Land Register data, which excludes lakes, ponds, glaciers > 1 km^{2} (0.386 sq mi or 247 acres) and river estuaries.

Épizon (French pronunciation: [epizɔ̃]) is a commune in the Haute-Marne department in north-eastern France. In 1972 it absorbed the former commune Bettoncourt-le-Haut. On 28 February 2013, Épizon annexed the neighboring commune of Pautaines-Augeville.

== See also ==
- Communes of the Haute-Marne department
