= Illoud =

- Commune
- Coat of arms
- Location of Illoud
- Location within France Location within Grand Est
- Coordinates: 48°12′37″N 5°33′36″E
- Country: France
- Region: Grand Est
- Department: Haute-Marne
- Arrondissement: Chaumont
- Canton: Poissons

Government
  - Mayor (2020–2026): Jean-Claude Brayer
- Area^{1}: 13.85 km^{2} (5.35 sq mi)
- Elevation: 340 m (1,120 ft)
- Population (2023): 191
  - Density: 13.8/km^{2} (35.7/sq mi)
- Time zone: UTC+01:00 (CET)
  - Summer (DST): UTC+02:00 (CEST)
- INSEE/Postal code: 52247 /52150
- ^{1} French Land Register data, which excludes lakes, ponds, glaciers > 1 km^{2} (0.386 sq mi or 247 acres) and river estuaries.

Illoud is a commune in the Haute-Marne department in north-eastern France.

== See also ==
- Communes of the Haute-Marne department
