= Chaumont-la-Ville =

- Commune
- Location of Chaumont-la-Ville
- Location within France Location within Grand Est
- Coordinates: 48°08′47″N 5°39′03″E
- Country: France
- Region: Grand Est
- Department: Haute-Marne
- Arrondissement: Chaumont
- Canton: Poissons
- Intercommunality: Meuse Rognon

Government
  - Mayor (2020–2026): Françoise Trelat-Vallon
- Area^{1}: 11.22 km^{2} (4.33 sq mi)
- Elevation: 350 m (1,150 ft)
- Population (2023): 109
  - Density: 9.71/km^{2} (25.2/sq mi)
- Time zone: UTC+01:00 (CET)
  - Summer (DST): UTC+02:00 (CEST)
- INSEE/Postal code: 52122 /52150
- ^{1} French Land Register data, which excludes lakes, ponds, glaciers > 1 km^{2} (0.386 sq mi or 247 acres) and river estuaries.

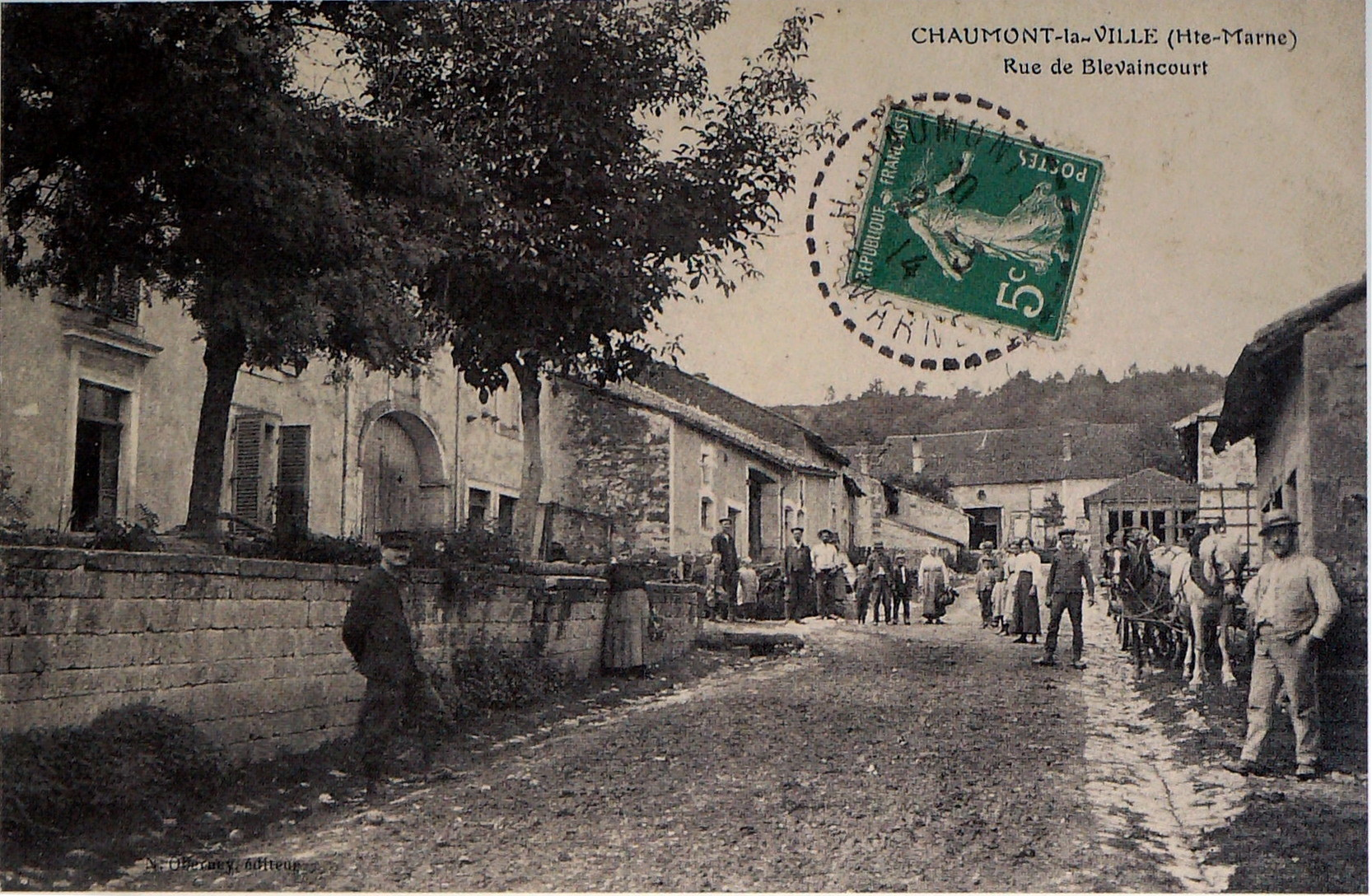
Chaumont-la-Ville

Chaumont-la-Ville (French pronunciation: [ʃomɔ̃ la vil]) is a commune in the Haute-Marne department in north-eastern France.

== See also ==
- Communes of the Haute-Marne department
