= Canton of Poissons =

Coordinates: 48.42°N 5.22°E

The canton of Poissons is an administrative division of the Haute-Marne department, northeastern France. Its borders were modified at the French canton reorganisation which came into effect in March 2015. Its seat is in Poissons.

It consists of the following communes:

1. Aillianville
2. Aingoulaincourt
3. Annonville
4. Audeloncourt
5. Bassoncourt
6. Bourg-Sainte-Marie
7. Bourmont-entre-Meuse-et-Mouzon
8. Brainville-sur-Meuse
9. Breuvannes-en-Bassigny
10. Busson
11. Chalvraines
12. Chambroncourt
13. Champigneulles-en-Bassigny
14. Chaumont-la-Ville
15. Cirfontaines-en-Ornois
16. Clinchamp
17. Doncourt-sur-Meuse
18. Échenay
19. Effincourt
20. Épizon
21. Germainvilliers
22. Germay
23. Germisay
24. Gillaumé
25. Graffigny-Chemin
26. Hâcourt
27. Harréville-les-Chanteurs
28. Huilliécourt
29. Humberville
30. Illoud
31. Lafauche
32. Leurville
33. Levécourt
34. Lezéville
35. Liffol-le-Petit
36. Longchamp
37. Maisoncelles
38. Malaincourt-sur-Meuse
39. Manois
40. Mennouveaux
41. Merrey
42. Millières
43. Montreuil-sur-Thonnance
44. Morionvilliers
45. Noncourt-sur-le-Rongeant
46. Orquevaux
47. Outremécourt
48. Ozières
49. Pansey
50. Paroy-sur-Saulx
51. Poissons
52. Prez-sous-Lafauche
53. Romain-sur-Meuse
54. Sailly
55. Saint-Blin
56. Saint-Thiébault
57. Saudron
58. Semilly
59. Sommerécourt
60. Soulaucourt-sur-Mouzon
61. Thol-lès-Millières
62. Thonnance-les-Moulins
63. Vaudrecourt
64. Vesaignes-sous-Lafauche
65. Vroncourt-la-Côte
