= Millières, Haute-Marne =

Millières
- Commune
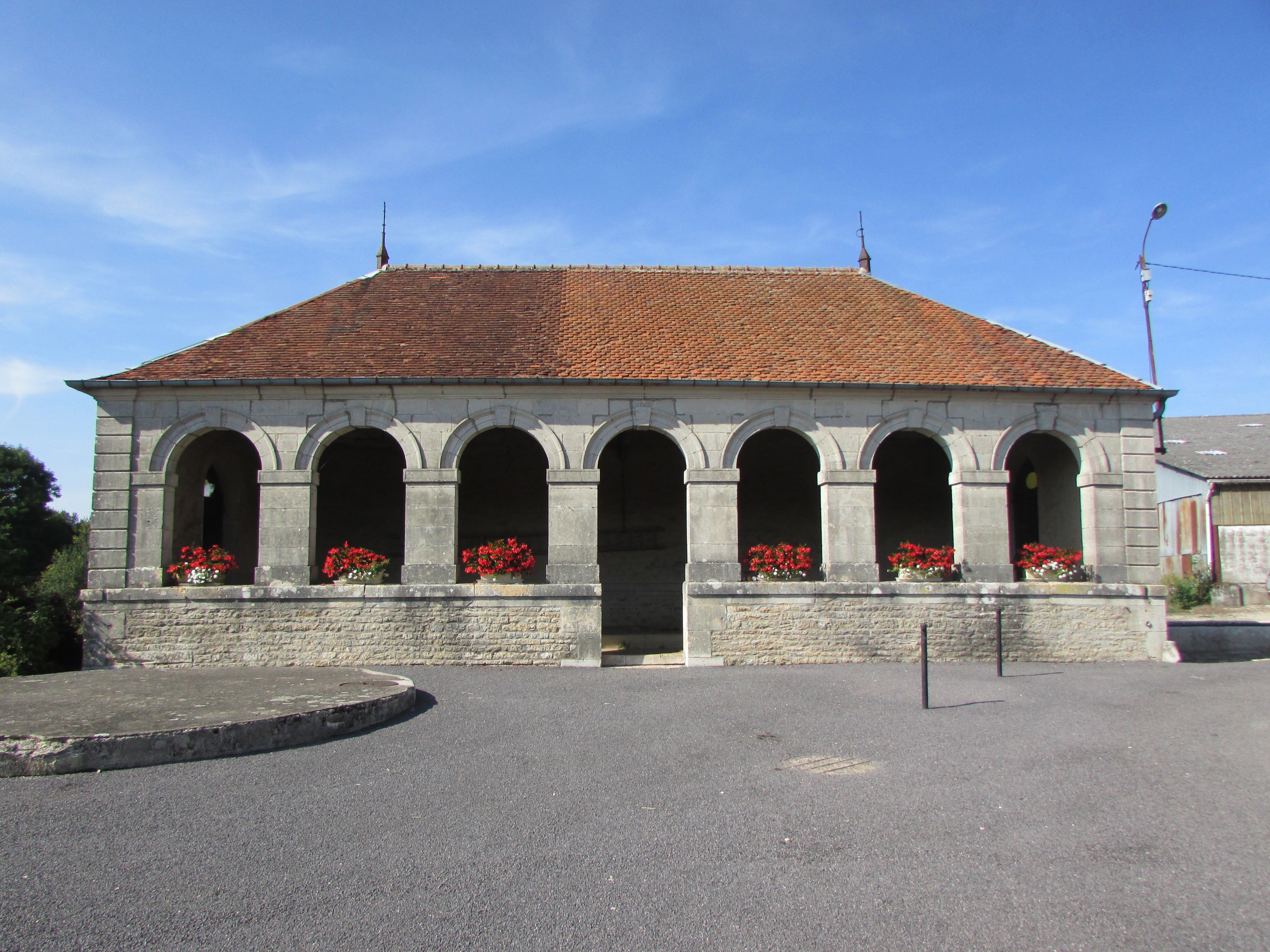
- The wash house in Millières
- Location of Millières
- Location within France Location within Grand Est
- Coordinates: 48°08′12″N 5°25′20″E
- Country: France
- Region: Grand Est
- Department: Haute-Marne
- Arrondissement: Chaumont
- Canton: Poissons

Government
  - Mayor (2020–2026): Jean-Guillaume Decorse
- Area^{1}: 14.09 km^{2} (5.44 sq mi)
- Elevation: 400 m (1,300 ft)
- Population (2023): 115
  - Density: 8.16/km^{2} (21.1/sq mi)
- Time zone: UTC+01:00 (CET)
  - Summer (DST): UTC+02:00 (CEST)
- INSEE/Postal code: 52325 /52240
- ^{1} French Land Register data, which excludes lakes, ponds, glaciers > 1 km^{2} (0.386 sq mi or 247 acres) and river estuaries.

Millières is a commune in the Haute-Marne department in north-eastern France.

== Population ==
Historical population
Year	Pop.	±% p.a.
1968	161	—
1975	118	−4.34%
1982	111	−0.87%
1990	112	+0.11%
1999	125	+1.23%
2007	127	+0.20%
2012	116	−1.80%
2017	114	−0.35%
2023	115	+0.15%
Source: INSEE

== See also ==
- Communes of the Haute-Marne department
