= Germainvilliers =

- Commune
- Coat of arms
- Location of Germainvilliers
- Location within France Location within Grand Est
- Coordinates: 48°07′02″N 5°38′45″E
- Country: France
- Region: Grand Est
- Department: Haute-Marne
- Arrondissement: Chaumont
- Canton: Poissons

Government
  - Mayor (2020–2026): Jean-Claude Laumont
- Area^{1}: 6.6 km^{2} (2.5 sq mi)
- Elevation: 350 m (1,150 ft)
- Population (2023): 83
  - Density: 13/km^{2} (33/sq mi)
- Time zone: UTC+01:00 (CET)
  - Summer (DST): UTC+02:00 (CEST)
- INSEE/Postal code: 52217 /52150
- ^{1} French Land Register data, which excludes lakes, ponds, glaciers > 1 km^{2} (0.386 sq mi or 247 acres) and river estuaries.

Germainvilliers (French pronunciation: [ʒɛʁmɛ̃vilje]) is a commune in the Haute-Marne department in north-eastern France.

== See also ==
- Communes of the Haute-Marne department
