= Lafauche =

- Commune
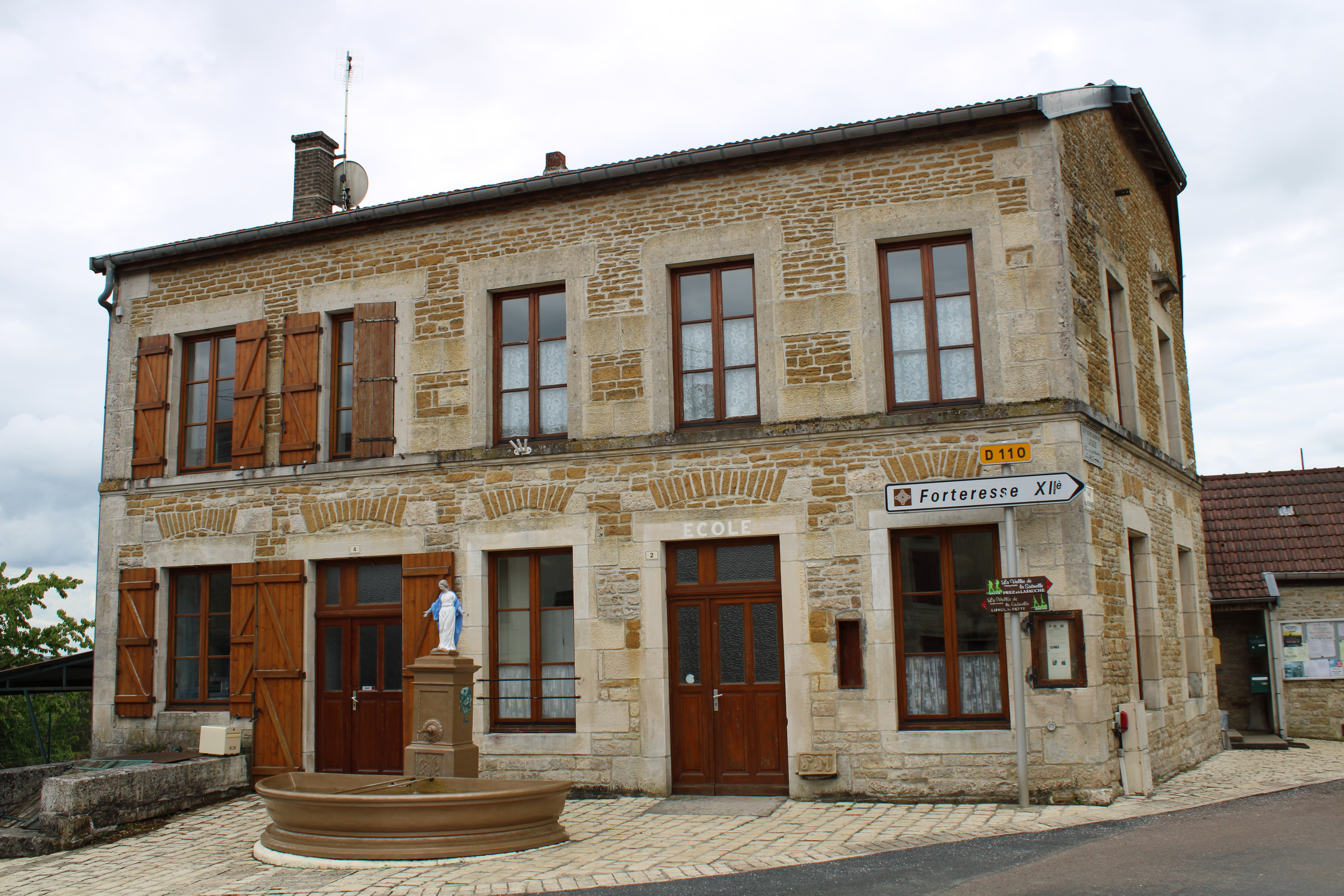
- The town hall in Lafauche

- Coat of arms
- Location of Lafauche
- Location within France Location within Grand Est
- Coordinates: 48°17′51″N 5°30′03″E
- Country: France
- Region: Grand Est
- Department: Haute-Marne
- Arrondissement: Chaumont
- Canton: Poissons

Government
  - Mayor (2020–2026): Jean-Philippe Nuffer
- Area^{1}: 5.16 km^{2} (1.99 sq mi)
- Elevation: 362 m (1,188 ft)
- Population (2023): 74
  - Density: 14/km^{2} (37/sq mi)
- Time zone: UTC+01:00 (CET)
  - Summer (DST): UTC+02:00 (CEST)
- INSEE/Postal code: 52256 /52700
- ^{1} French Land Register data, which excludes lakes, ponds, glaciers > 1 km^{2} (0.386 sq mi or 247 acres) and river estuaries.

Lafauche (French pronunciation: [lafoʃ]) is a commune in the Haute-Marne department in north-eastern France.

== See also ==
- Communes of the Haute-Marne department
