= Battle of Longeau =

1870 battle in the Franco-Prussian War

- Part of Franco-Prussian War
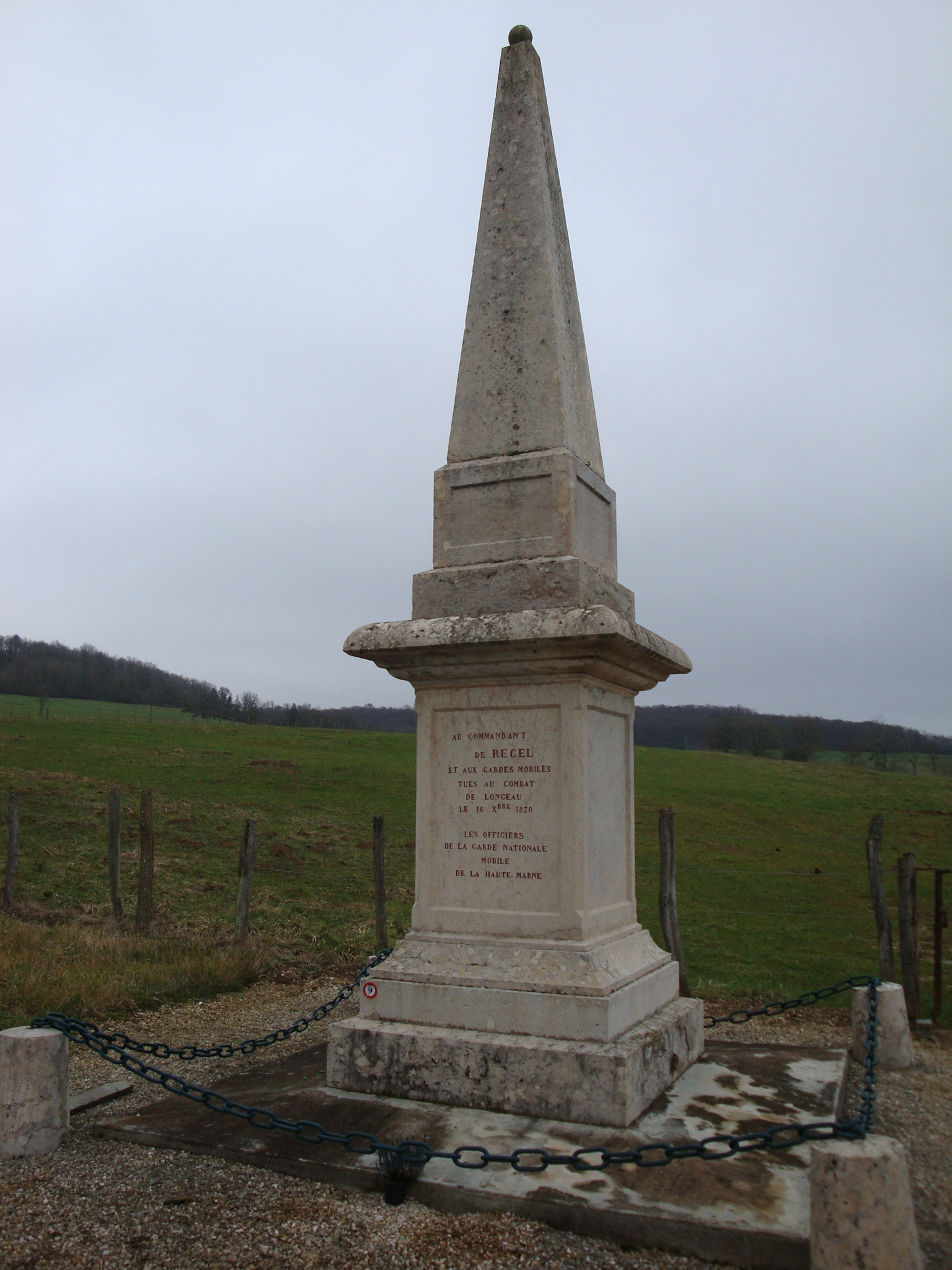
- Stele of the Mobiles
Date	16 December 1870
Location	Longeau-Percey, Haute-Marne, France
Result	German victory

Belligerents
French Republic	North German Confederation: Prussia

Commanders and leaders
General Arbellot; Stanislaus Koch †	August von Werder; Colmar Freiherr von der Goltz

Strength
2,000 – 6,000 troops and 4 cannons	6,500 troops and 15 cannons

Casualties and losses
200 wounded, 50 captured, 2 artillery pieces and 2 ammunition wagons captured	20 casualties (4 killed and 15 wounded, 1 officer)

The Battle of Longeau, was a battle of the Franco-Prussian War on 16 December 1870 in Longeau-Percey, near Dijon, France. The fighting lasted about three hours, and ended in a French retreat. Victory went to the Prussian Infantry Brigade under Colmar Freiherr von der Goltz and the German XIV Corps infantry under the command of Lieutenant General August von Werder, over French troops commanded by General Pierre Arbellot de Vacqueur, semt from Langres to Longeau. The French suffered significant losses of both manpower and equipment.

== Background ==
The goal of the Armée de l'Est (Army of the East) under division general Charles-Denis Bourbaki was to reach the Colonel Denfort-Rochereau in the besieged Belfort, and take the German forces from behind. To counter this maneuver, the German 2nd and 7th armies moved south from Metz and Paris. From Verseilles-le-Haut, General de Moltke asked the XIV Army Corps, posted around Dijon, to put an end to raids on supply units and destroy the railways that linked Besançon and Belfort to the rest of France.

== Battle ==
On 14 December Infantry General von Werder, commanding the XIV Corps, sent the Prussian brigade of von der Goltz to Langres, via Is-sur-Tille and Selongey. It consisted of the 30th regiment of the 4th Rhine infantry and the 34th regiment of the Pomeranian Fusiliers, approximately 6000 men, reinforced with a 700-horse cavalry regiment and an artillery division with three batteries of six cannons each.

A garrison of 200 French soldiers from the 50th line regiment, had been stationed at Longeau since 1 November. On the morning of 16 December General Arbellot, in command at Langres, was warned of the arrival of the Prussians and brought in reinforcements — 1,500 men from the line and the mobiles. The mobiles of the 2nd battalion of the 56th provisional infantry regiment were commanded by Stanislas de Régel under the overall command of captain Koch.

At eleven o'clock, the Prussian brigade launched its first shells. On the French side, in the confusion, two cannons headed for Verseilles-le-Haut and two others hid above the cemetery. Some troops accompanied the guns; other soldiers took position next to Longeau-Percey. The remainder were stationed in the center of Longeau.

The main road had been made impassable by abatis and cuts, so the Prussians marched around it, one column through Verseilles-le-Bas, and another Cohons, against the wings of the position, and dislodged the mobiles, from whom they took a cannon. The French mobiles fell back to higher ground northeast of the village and tried to hold on with the two pieces they had left. But after a short time, they had to retreat again, abandoning a second cannon, which was captured while still firing. Pursued by Prussian shells, they tried in vain to make a stand a third time near the village of Bourg and finally returned to Langres, having lost 150 men, including the commanders Koch and Régel, 80 prisoners, two pieces of artillery and two caissons.

== Aftermath ==
Having lost only twenty men, of which four were killed and 15 were wounded, including one officer, General von der Goltz stopped in Bourg for the night. The next day, he bypassed Langres to the west and established himself north of the city, between the Marne and Suize rivers, a position from which he covered the supply lines of the 2nd Army. By order of Werder, he extended his troops further east, from Neuilly-l'Évêque to Laferté-sur-Amance. On 18 December he sent word to Langres but General Arbellot refused to capitulate. To bombard the city, von der Goltz pulled all the advance troops back to the ramparts and proceeded to build batteries.

On 26 December, having learned that the army of General Charles-Denis Bourbaki was moving towards Chalon-sur-Saône, Werder evacuated Dijon and assembled the 16th army around Vesoul. All detachments were recalled. The von der Goltz brigade immediately fell back to Vesoul.

== Monuments ==
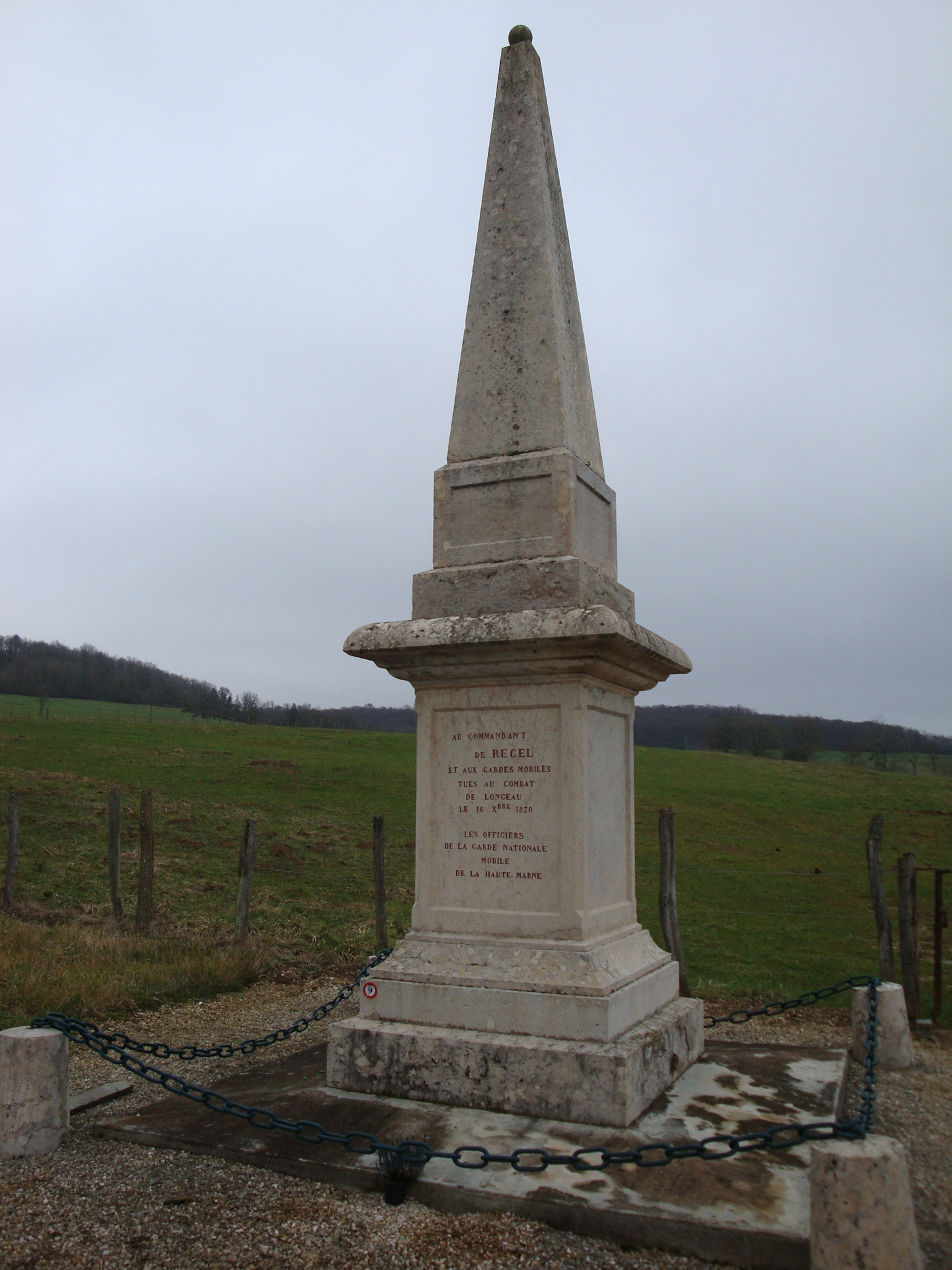
Stèle of the Mobiles.

Three commemorative monuments were built after the war to commemorate the battle. The Guide to the Monuments of the War of 1870-1871 states:

“Régel's family intends to honor the memory of the commander by building, as was done at the time, a cross on the place where he died. And as he died at the head of his mobiles, the dedication associates the memory of Stanislas de Régel and, by name, that of the mobiles killed in the same fight. ‘In memory of Stanislas de Régel, commander of the Haute-Marne mobiles, fatally struck in action at Longeau on 16 December 1870. And that of his brave soldiers killed in the same battle: Grapotte Nicolas, Charles Anselme, Mugnier Marcellin Louis, Durand Hippolyte, Nicolas Charles, Villemot Nicolas’.

Regardless of Régel's family and unable or unwilling to consult them, veterans of the mobile guards of Haute-Marne intended to honor their dead with a monument. Theirs does not bear any religious sign, perhaps the reason for the Calvary built. by the family. "To the commander of Régel and the mobile guards killed in action at Longeau on 16 December 1870, the officers of the Mobile National Guard of Hte-Marne".

The third monument is in the cemetery of Longeau with two plaques. One reads: "In memory of the fighters who fell at the battle of Longeau on 16.12.1870. Cadet S. De Regel, Ignace Quenemann, Jean Wichert, Pierre Etienne, Nicolas Grapotte, Cadet M. Charles Koch, Louis M. Mognier, Joseph Gony, Sébastien Jacob, Hyppolyte Durand", on the other: "Unseren Tapferen Kameraden" (Our Brave Comrades).

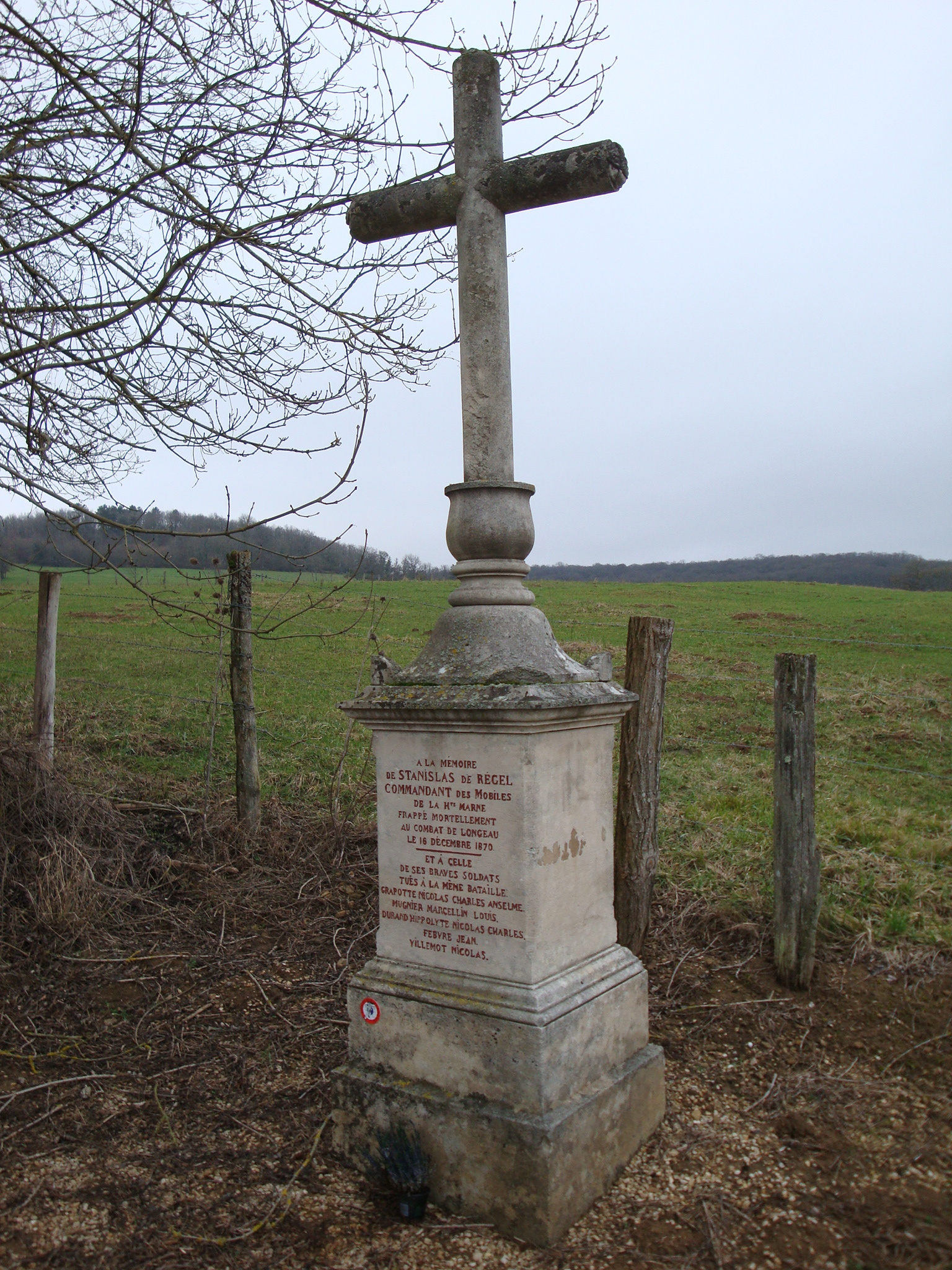
Cross

== See also ==
- List of Imperial German infantry regiments

== Bibliography ==
- Histoire de Langres, Dominique Guéniot-Imprimeur, Langres, 1988.
- Commandant Rousset, Histoire générale de la guerre franco-allemande (1870-1871) Librairie Illustrée Paris
- Abbé Dimey curé-doyen de Longeau, Journal
- Jacques, François (2006). Association La montagne (ed.). Longeau et Percey-le-Pautel [i.e. Pantel] au XIXe siècle : de la Grande armée à la Belle époque (in French). Vol. 11. Longeau. p. 75. OCLC 470514788..
