= Verseilles =

Verseilles (French pronunciation: [veʁsej]) is a French toponym. It may refer to:

- Verseilles-le-Bas, France
- Verseilles-le-Haut, France

== See also ==
- Fabien Verseille
