= Aulnoy =

Aulnoy may refer to:

- Madame d'Aulnoy
- Aulnoy, Seine-et-Marne, a commune of the Seine-et-Marne département, in France
- Aulnoy-lez-Valenciennes, a commune of the Nord département, in France
- Aulnoy-sur-Aube, a commune of the Haute-Marne département, in France
