= William Firmatus =

Norman hermit and pilgrim

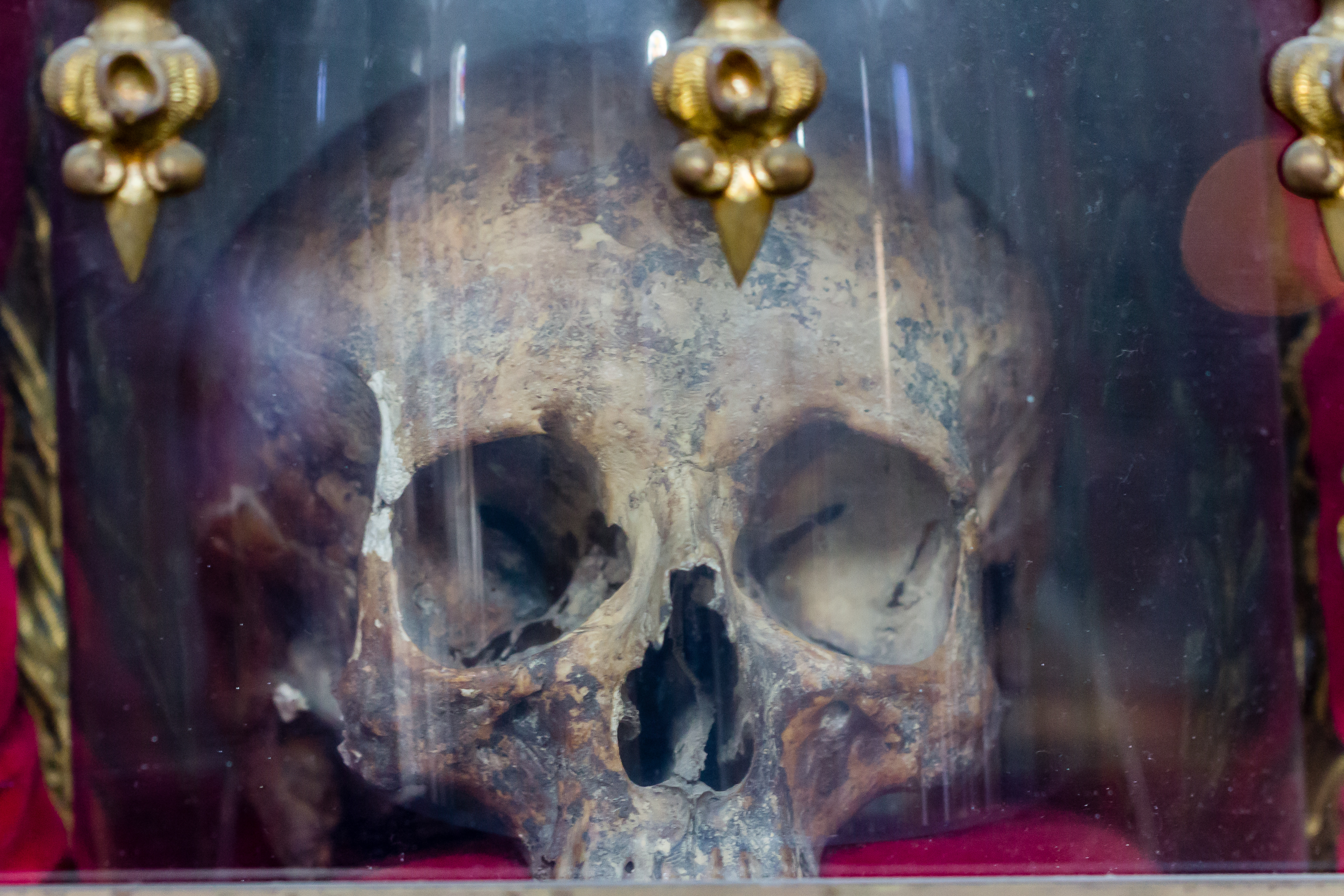
- Relics of William Firmatus in Mortain (France).
- Born: 1026; Tours, France
- Died: 1103 (aged 76–77)

William Firmatus (French: Guillaume Firmat; 1026–1103) was a Norman hermit and pilgrim of the eleventh century.

== Life ==
William Firmatus was a canon and a physician of Tours, France. Following a spiritual prompting against greed, he gave away all his possessions to the poor. He lived a reclusive life with his mother until he entered a hermitage near Laval, Mayenne. He spent the rest of his life on pilgrimages and as a hermit at Savigny and Mantilly.

According to legend, he saved the people of Choilley-Dardenay during drought by striking the ground with his pilgrim's staff, which caused a spring of water to bubble up. He died in 1103 of natural causes.

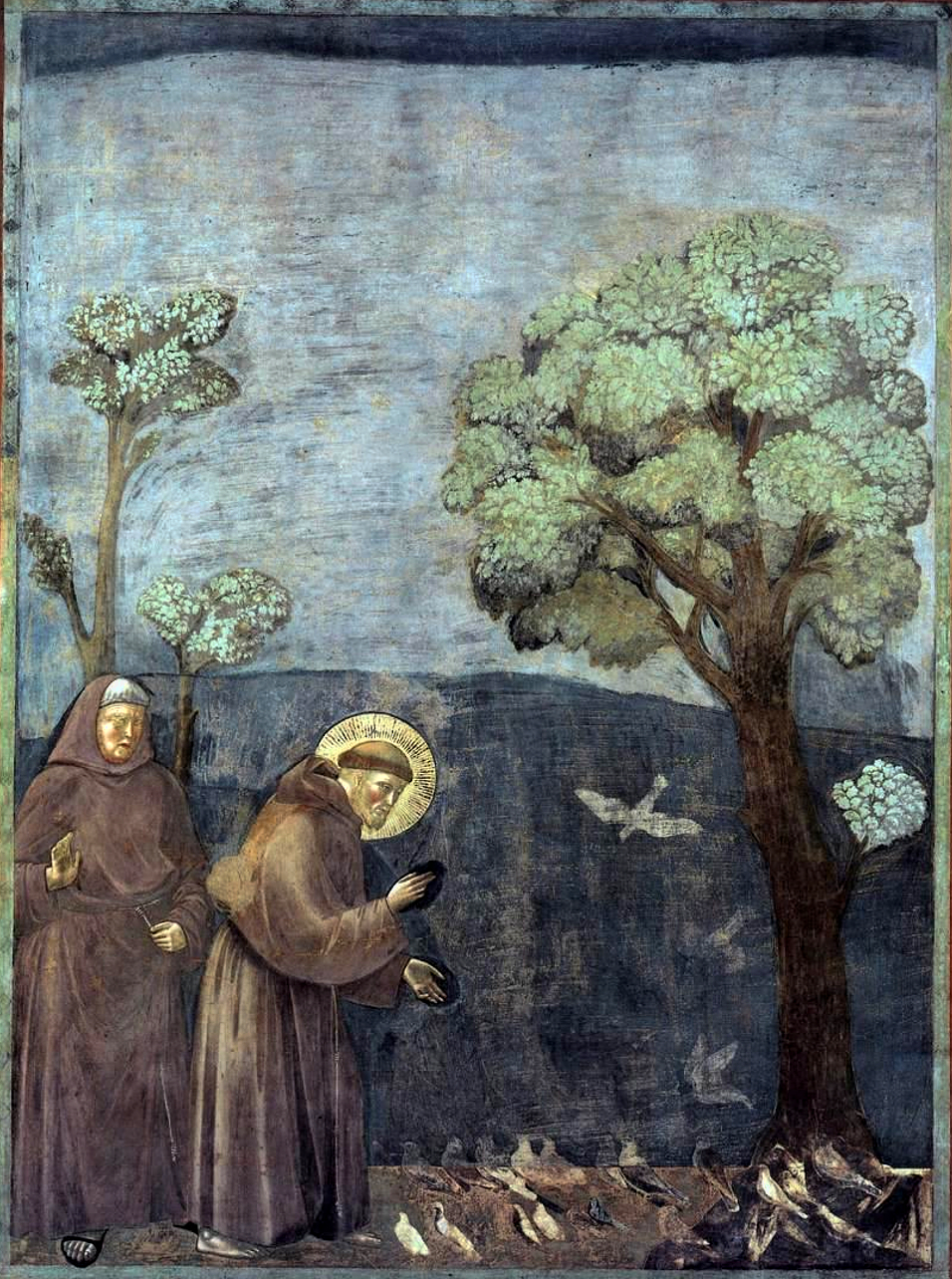
The Sermon to the Birds of Saint Francis, by Giotto (1266). The life of William Firmatus evinced a similar relationship with nature.

=== Relationship with wild animals ===
William is especially noted for his love of wildlife and the unusual level of communication he seemed to have with animals. This was so much so that the local people used to ask his help with animals that raided their crops. One particular story to this effect involves a wild boar, which William is said to have led by the ear from a farmer's plot, instructing it to fast for the night in a solitary cell.

The Little Bollandists go on to record, along with the boar miracle, that

It is said of him that even the wildest birds would approach him without fear, and come and eat out of his hand, and take refuge under his clothes from the cold. When he sat by a pond near his cell, the fish would swim to his feet and readily allow themselves to be taken up by the servant of God, who put them back into the water without hurting them.

== Veneration ==
Upon William's death, three townships disputed possession of his remains. The winner was Mortain, which, to procure the relics, used the full force of "its entire clergy and an innumerable crowd of its people".

William is also venerated at Savigny and Mantilly. Catholic Encyclopedia mentions William in its article on Coutances, which accords him special honor as well, and mentions his patronage of the collegiate church of Mortain.

=== Iconography ===
In art, William is often shown thrusting his arm into a fire. Also, he may be depicted with a raven, which is guiding him as a pilgrim to the Holy Land.
