= Mouilleron (disambiguation) =

Mouilleron is a village in the Haute-Marne department, in France.

Mouilleron may also refer to:

- Mouilleron-en-Pareds, Vendée
- Mouilleron-le-Captif, Vendée
