= Voisines =

Voisines may refer to the following places in France:

- Voisines, Haute-Marne, a commune in the Haute-Marne department
- Voisines, Yonne, a commune in the Yonne department
