= Villiers-lès-Aprey =

- Commune
- Location of Villiers-lès-Aprey
- Location within France Location within Grand Est
- Coordinates: 47°45′00″N 5°12′45″E
- Country: France
- Region: Grand Est
- Department: Haute-Marne
- Arrondissement: Langres
- Canton: Villegusien-le-Lac
- Intercommunality: Auberive Vingeanne et Montsaugeonnais

Government
  - Mayor (2020–2026): Roseline Bernard
- Area^{1}: 7.39 km^{2} (2.85 sq mi)
- Elevation: 379 m (1,243 ft)
- Highest elevation: 461 m (1,512 ft)
- Lowest elevation: 338 m (1,109 ft)
- Population (2023): 47
  - Density: 6.4/km^{2} (16/sq mi)
- Time zone: UTC+01:00 (CET)
  - Summer (DST): UTC+02:00 (CEST)
- INSEE/Postal code: 52536 /52190
- ^{1} French Land Register data, which excludes lakes, ponds, glaciers > 1 km^{2} (0.386 sq mi or 247 acres) and river estuaries.

Villiers-lès-Aprey (French pronunciation: [vilje lɛz‿apʁɛ], literally Villiers near Aprey) is a commune in the Haute-Marne department in north-eastern France.

== See also ==
- Communes of the Haute-Marne department
