= Vesvres-sous-Chalancey =

- Commune
- Location of Vesvres-sous-Chalancey
- Location within France Location within Grand Est
- Coordinates: 47°41′40″N 5°10′10″E
- Country: France
- Region: Grand Est
- Department: Haute-Marne
- Arrondissement: Langres
- Canton: Villegusien-le-Lac
- Intercommunality: Auberive Vingeanne et Montsaugeonnais

Government
  - Mayor (2020–2026): Jacques Bourceret
- Area^{1}: 7.22 km^{2} (2.79 sq mi)
- Elevation: 415 m (1,362 ft)
- Population (2023): 49
  - Density: 6.8/km^{2} (18/sq mi)
- Time zone: UTC+01:00 (CET)
  - Summer (DST): UTC+02:00 (CEST)
- INSEE/Postal code: 52519 /52190
- ^{1} French Land Register data, which excludes lakes, ponds, glaciers > 1 km^{2} (0.386 sq mi or 247 acres) and river estuaries.

Vesvres-sous-Chalancey (French pronunciation: [vɛvʁ su ʃalɑ̃sɛ], literally Vesvres under Chalancey) is a commune in the Haute-Marne department in north-eastern France.

== See also ==
- Communes of the Haute-Marne department
