= Ternat, Haute-Marne =

Ternat
- Commune
- Location of Ternat
- Location within France Location within Grand Est
- Coordinates: 47°54′26″N 5°07′40″E
- Country: France
- Region: Grand Est
- Department: Haute-Marne
- Arrondissement: Langres
- Canton: Villegusien-le-Lac
- Intercommunality: Auberive Vingeanne et Montsaugeonnais

Government
  - Mayor (2020–2026): Jean-Paul Pageard
- Area^{1}: 7.91 km^{2} (3.05 sq mi)
- Elevation: 352 m (1,155 ft)
- Highest elevation: 452 m (1,483 ft)
- Lowest elevation: 330 m (1,080 ft)
- Population (2023): 62
  - Density: 7.8/km^{2} (20/sq mi)
- Time zone: UTC+01:00 (CET)
  - Summer (DST): UTC+02:00 (CEST)
- INSEE/Postal code: 52486 /52210
- ^{1} French Land Register data, which excludes lakes, ponds, glaciers > 1 km^{2} (0.386 sq mi or 247 acres) and river estuaries.

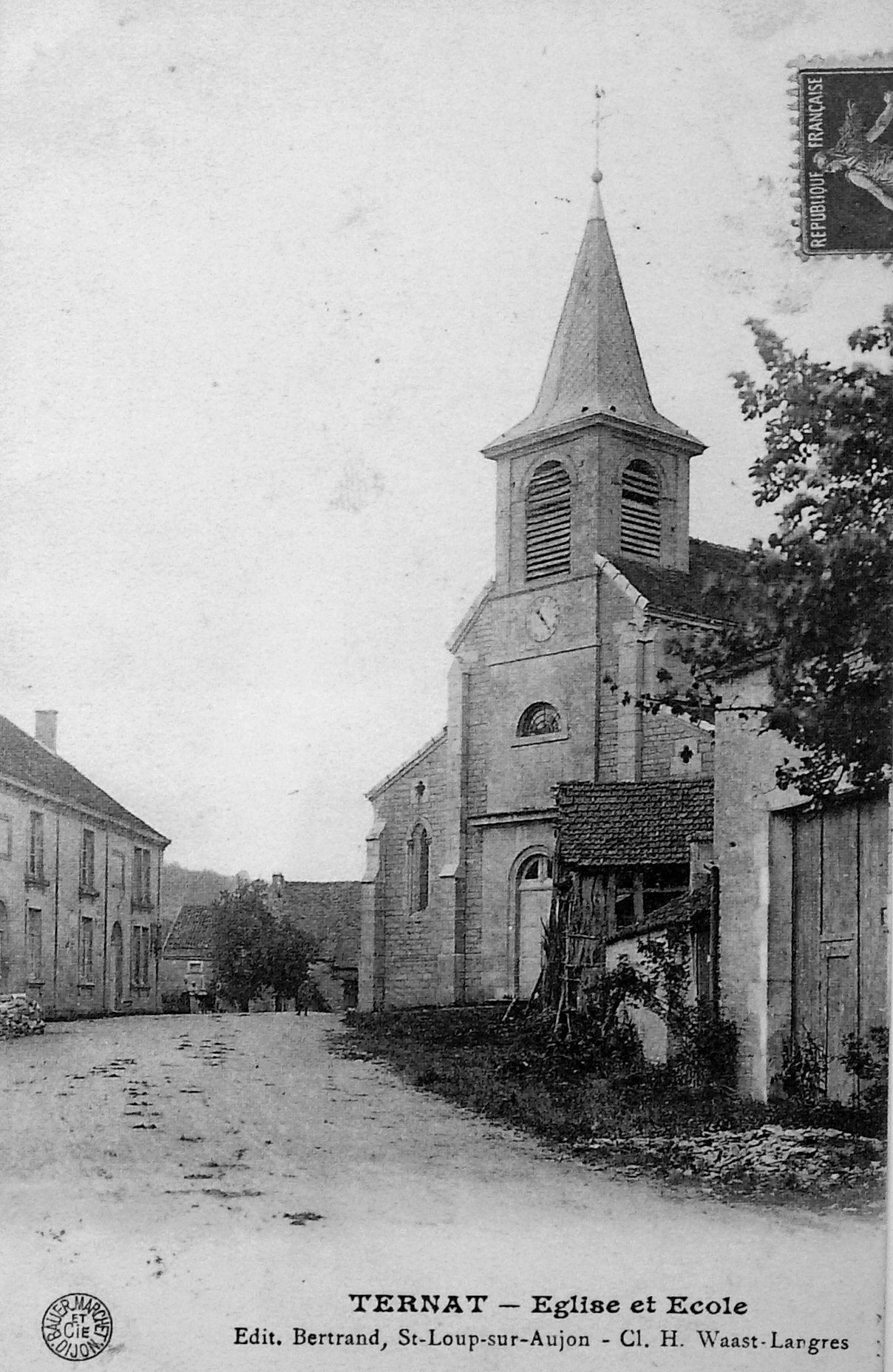
Ternat 73065

Ternat (French pronunciation: [tɛʁna]) is a commune in the Haute-Marne department in north-eastern France.

== See also ==
- Communes of the Haute-Marne department
