= Orcevaux =

- Commune
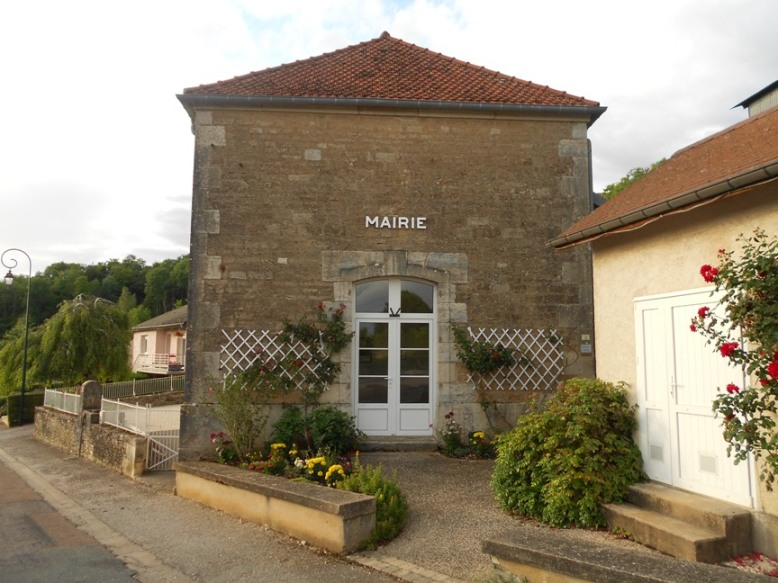
- The town hall in Orcevaux
- Location of Orcevaux
- Location within France Location within Grand Est
- Coordinates: 47°46′32″N 5°16′21″E
- Country: France
- Region: Grand Est
- Department: Haute-Marne
- Arrondissement: Langres
- Canton: Villegusien-le-Lac
- Intercommunality: Auberive Vingeanne et Montsaugeonnais

Government
  - Mayor (2020–2026): Alexandre Moliard
- Area^{1}: 4.22 km^{2} (1.63 sq mi)
- Elevation: 410 m (1,350 ft)
- Highest elevation: 458 m (1,503 ft)
- Lowest elevation: 321 m (1,053 ft)
- Population (2023): 102
  - Density: 24.2/km^{2} (62.6/sq mi)
- Time zone: UTC+01:00 (CET)
  - Summer (DST): UTC+02:00 (CEST)
- INSEE/Postal code: 52364 /52250
- ^{1} French Land Register data, which excludes lakes, ponds, glaciers > 1 km^{2} (0.386 sq mi or 247 acres) and river estuaries.

Orcevaux (French pronunciation: [ɔʁsəvo]) is a commune in the Haute-Marne department in north-eastern France. The village stretches along the hillside, exposing its facades and orchards to the sun. Orcevaux was the former hamlet of Flagey and became a commune during the Revolution.

The inhabitants of this village are called Orcivalien(ennes).

== Geography ==
The altitude of Orcevaux is approximately 410 meters. Its area is 4.22 km2. Its latitude is 47.776 degrees north and its longitude is 5.272 degrees east. The towns and villages near Orcevaux are : Flagey at 1.3 km, Verseilles-le-Bas at 2.0 km, Verseilles-le-Haut at 2.1 km, Brennes at 2.4 km, Baissey at 3.0 km.

== See also ==
- Communes of the Haute-Marne department
