= Occey =

- Commune
- Location of Occey
- Location within France Location within Grand Est
- Coordinates: 47°36′46″N 5°16′41″E
- Country: France
- Region: Grand Est
- Department: Haute-Marne
- Arrondissement: Langres
- Canton: Villegusien-le-Lac
- Intercommunality: Auberive Vingeanne et Montsaugeonnais

Government
  - Mayor (2020–2026): Florent Cadet
- Area^{1}: 16.87 km^{2} (6.51 sq mi)
- Elevation: 290 m (950 ft)
- Population (2023): 168
  - Density: 9.96/km^{2} (25.8/sq mi)
- Time zone: UTC+01:00 (CET)
  - Summer (DST): UTC+02:00 (CEST)
- INSEE/Postal code: 52360 /52190
- ^{1} French Land Register data, which excludes lakes, ponds, glaciers > 1 km^{2} (0.386 sq mi or 247 acres) and river estuaries.

Occey (French pronunciation: [ɔksɛ]) is a commune in the Haute-Marne department in north-eastern France.

== See also ==
- Communes of the Haute-Marne department
