= Aprey Faience =

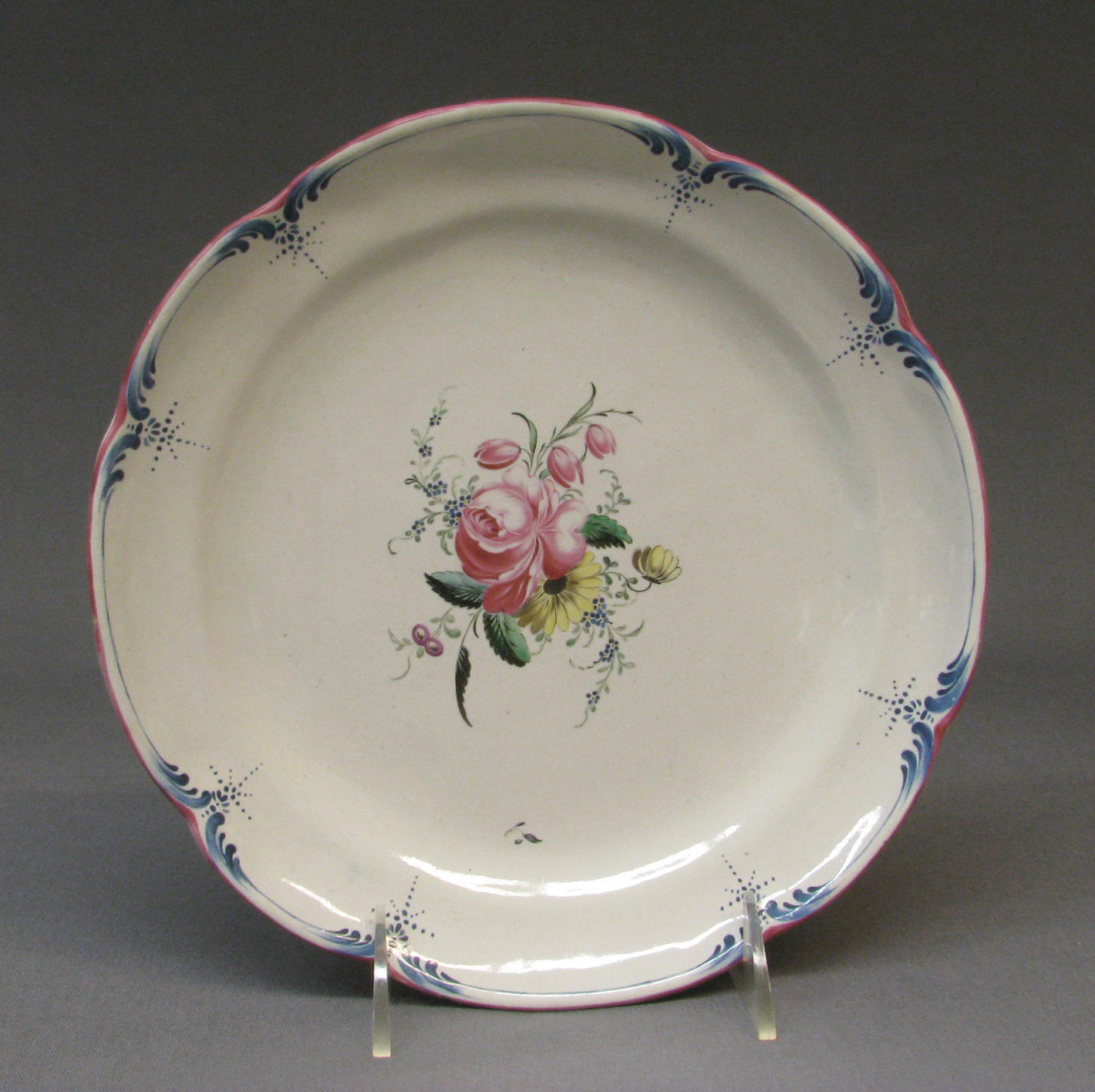
Plate, 1750-1800

Aprey Faïence is a name used for the painted, tin-glazed faience pottery produced at a glass-works at Aprey, France. This factory was established in 1744 by Jacques Lallemont de Villehaut, the Baron d'Aprey, on his estate. In 1760 he partnered with his brother Joseph, and the two hired Protaix Pidoux, a Swiss pottery painter. Jacques withdrew from business in 1769, so Joseph hired François Ollivier, a potter. Ollivier became director from 1774–1792. The factory came under the ownership of the Baron d'Anthès de Longpierre in 1789, then closed in 1885.

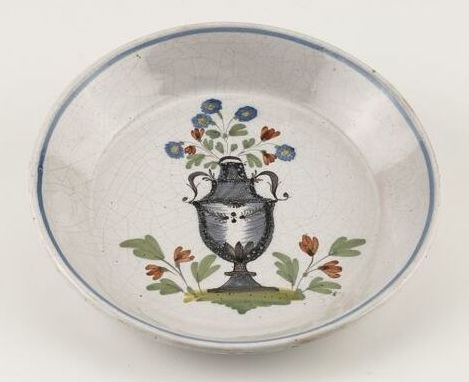
Bowl, c. 1830

The pottery produced at this factory were styled after early Strasbourg pieces, typically with decorations of birds or flowers. The high quality of the work produced at this factory, along with the bird illustrations by the chief painter, made these pieces a preference of collectors. Early works did not have a distinct marking. Later pottery was of a lower quality, and these inferior pieces were typically marked with an A.P. symbol and the initials of the painter.
