= Courcelles-en-Montagne =

- Commune
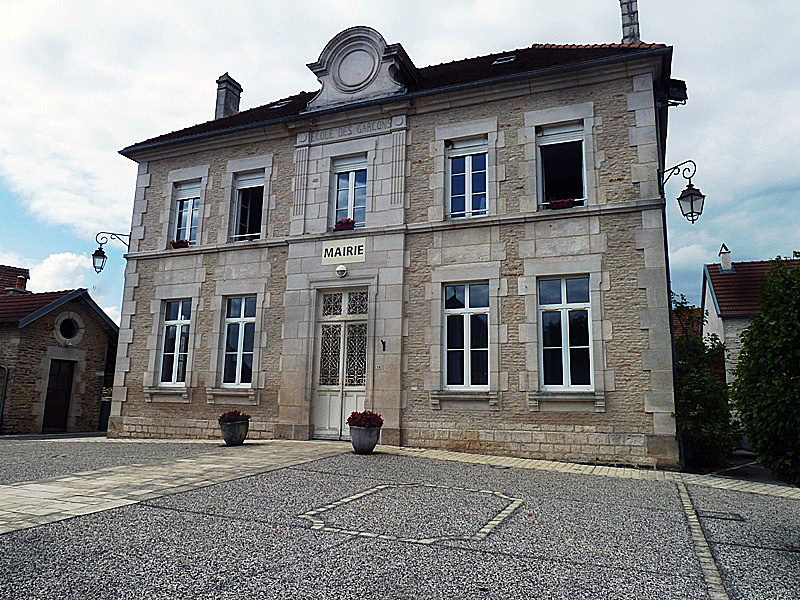
- Town hall
- Location of Courcelles-en-Montagne
- Location within France Location within Grand Est
- Coordinates: 47°50′16″N 5°13′26″E
- Country: France
- Region: Grand Est
- Department: Haute-Marne
- Arrondissement: Langres
- Canton: Villegusien-le-Lac

Government
  - Mayor (2020–2026): Romain Dir
- Area^{1}: 15.16 km^{2} (5.85 sq mi)
- Elevation: 430 m (1,410 ft)
- Highest elevation: 497 m (1,631 ft)
- Lowest elevation: 374 m (1,227 ft)
- Population (2023): 94
  - Density: 6.2/km^{2} (16/sq mi)
- Time zone: UTC+01:00 (CET)
  - Summer (DST): UTC+02:00 (CEST)
- INSEE/Postal code: 52147 /52200
- ^{1} French Land Register data, which excludes lakes, ponds, glaciers > 1 km^{2} (0.386 sq mi or 247 acres) and river estuaries.

Courcelles-en-Montagne (French pronunciation: [kuʁsɛl ɑ̃ mɔ̃taɲ]) is a commune in the Haute-Marne department in north-eastern France.

== See also ==
- Communes of the Haute-Marne department
