= Bay-sur-Aube =

- Commune
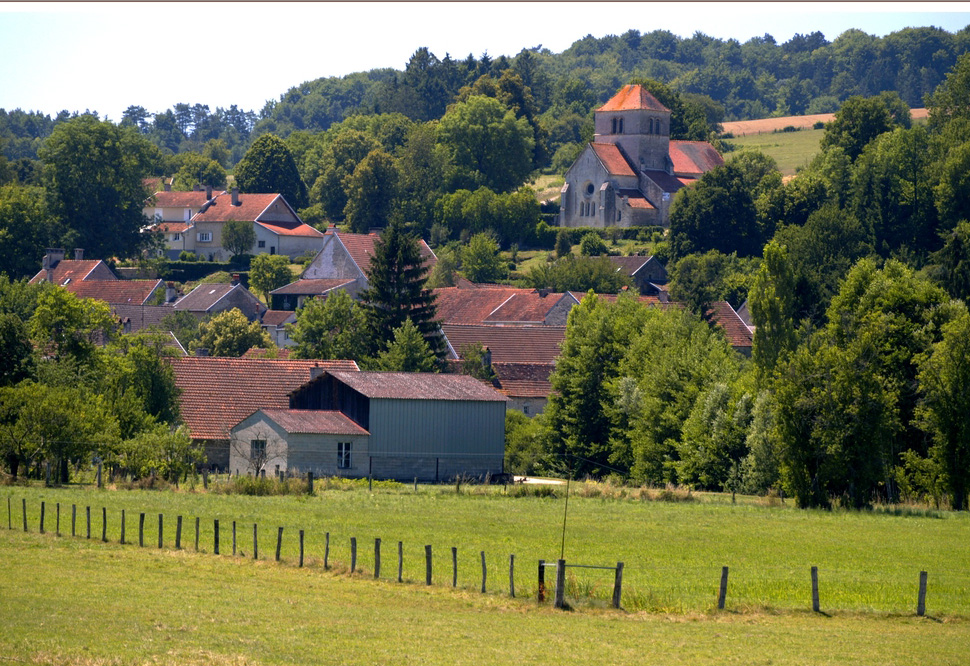
- A general view of Bay-sur-Aube
- Location of Bay-sur-Aube
- Location within France Location within Grand Est
- Coordinates: 47°49′19″N 5°03′51″E
- Country: France
- Region: Grand Est
- Department: Haute-Marne
- Arrondissement: Langres
- Canton: Villegusien-le-Lac

Government
  - Mayor (2020–2026): Yves Vaillant
- Area^{1}: 9.75 km^{2} (3.76 sq mi)
- Elevation: 320 m (1,050 ft)
- Highest elevation: 446 m (1,463 ft)
- Lowest elevation: 307 m (1,007 ft)
- Population (2023): 45
  - Density: 4.6/km^{2} (12/sq mi)
- Time zone: UTC+01:00 (CET)
  - Summer (DST): UTC+02:00 (CEST)
- INSEE/Postal code: 52040 /52160
- ^{1} French Land Register data, which excludes lakes, ponds, glaciers > 1 km^{2} (0.386 sq mi or 247 acres) and river estuaries.

Bay-sur-Aube (French pronunciation: [bɛ syʁ ob], literally Bay on Aube) is a commune in the Haute-Marne department in the Grand Est region in northeastern France.

== Population ==
Historical population
Year	Pop.	±% p.a.
1968	119	—
1975	72	−6.93%
1982	66	−1.24%
1990	55	−2.25%
1999	54	−0.20%
2007	56	+0.46%
2012	49	−2.64%
2017	52	+1.20%
2023	45	−2.38%
Source: INSEE

== See also ==
- Communes of the Haute-Marne department
