= Cusey =

- Commune
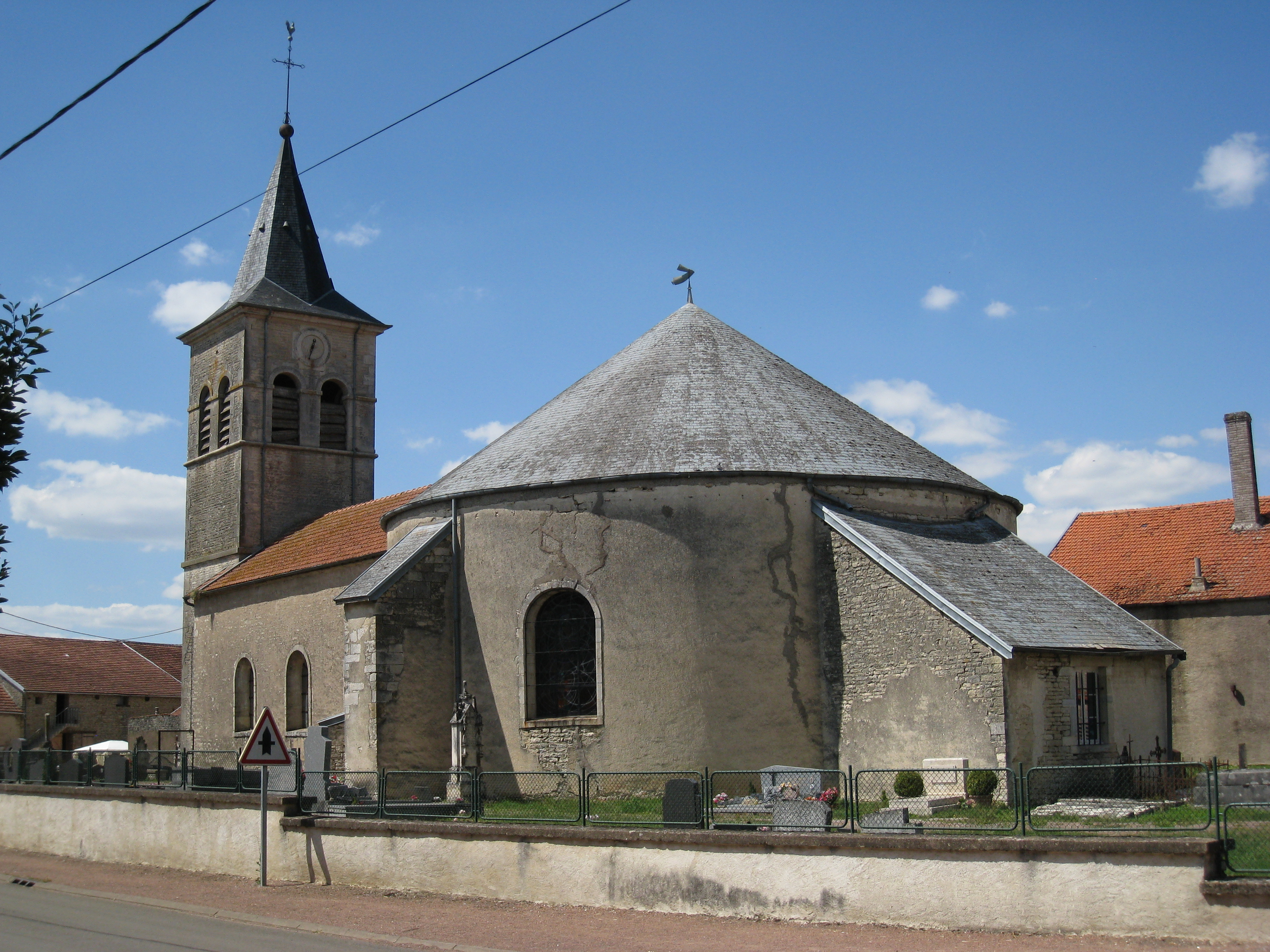
- The church in Cusey
- Location of Cusey
- Location within France Location within Grand Est
- Coordinates: 47°37′55″N 5°20′34″E
- Country: France
- Region: Grand Est
- Department: Haute-Marne
- Arrondissement: Langres
- Canton: Villegusien-le-Lac
- Intercommunality: Auberive Vingeanne et Montsaugeonnais

Government
  - Mayor (2020–2026): Jean-Michel Rabiet
- Area^{1}: 23.22 km^{2} (8.97 sq mi)
- Elevation: 252 m (827 ft)
- Population (2023): 291
  - Density: 12.5/km^{2} (32.5/sq mi)
- Time zone: UTC+01:00 (CET)
  - Summer (DST): UTC+02:00 (CEST)
- INSEE/Postal code: 52158 /52190
- ^{1} French Land Register data, which excludes lakes, ponds, glaciers > 1 km^{2} (0.386 sq mi or 247 acres) and river estuaries.

Cusey (French pronunciation: [kyzɛ]) is a commune in the Haute-Marne department in north-eastern France.

== See also ==
- Communes of the Haute-Marne department
