= Vals-des-Tilles =

- Commune
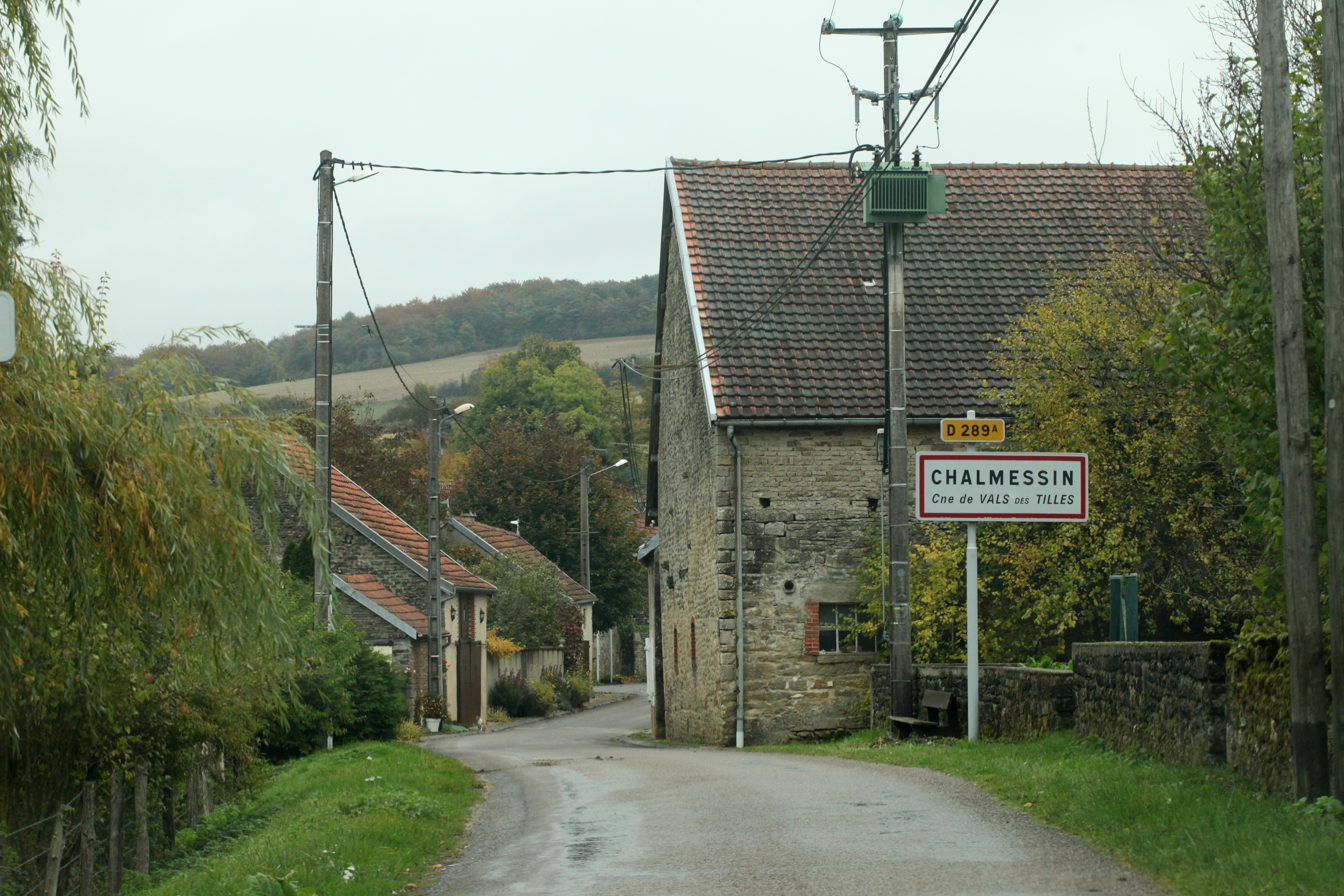
- The road into Chalmessin in Vals-des-Tilles
- Location of Vals-des-Tilles
- Location within France Location within Grand Est
- Coordinates: 47°42′16″N 5°04′16″E
- Country: France
- Region: Grand Est
- Department: Haute-Marne
- Arrondissement: Langres
- Canton: Villegusien-le-Lac
- Intercommunality: Auberive Vingeanne et Montsaugeonnais

Government
  - Mayor (2020–2026): Anne-Cécile Dury
- Area^{1}: 36.89 km^{2} (14.24 sq mi)
- Elevation: 380 m (1,250 ft)
- Highest elevation: 504 m (1,654 ft)
- Lowest elevation: 329 m (1,079 ft)
- Population (2023): 180
  - Density: 4.9/km^{2} (13/sq mi)
- Time zone: UTC+01:00 (CET)
  - Summer (DST): UTC+02:00 (CEST)
- INSEE/Postal code: 52094 /52160
- ^{1} French Land Register data, which excludes lakes, ponds, glaciers > 1 km^{2} (0.386 sq mi or 247 acres) and river estuaries.

Vals-des-Tilles is a commune in the Haute-Marne department in north-eastern France.

== See also ==
- Communes of the Haute-Marne department
