= Dommarien =

- Commune
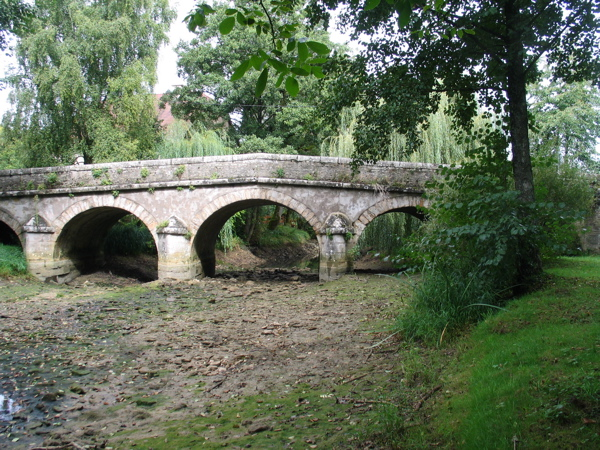
- The bridge in Dommarien
- Location of Dommarien
- Location within France Location within Grand Est
- Coordinates: 47°41′18″N 5°20′51″E
- Country: France
- Region: Grand Est
- Department: Haute-Marne
- Arrondissement: Langres
- Canton: Villegusien-le-Lac

Government
  - Mayor (2020–2026): Patrice Parisel
- Area^{1}: 17.75 km^{2} (6.85 sq mi)
- Elevation: 323 m (1,060 ft)
- Population (2023): 167
  - Density: 9.41/km^{2} (24.4/sq mi)
- Time zone: UTC+01:00 (CET)
  - Summer (DST): UTC+02:00 (CEST)
- INSEE/Postal code: 52170 /52190
- ^{1} French Land Register data, which excludes lakes, ponds, glaciers > 1 km^{2} (0.386 sq mi or 247 acres) and river estuaries.

Dommarien (French pronunciation: [dɔmaʁjɛ̃]) is a commune in the Haute-Marne department in north-eastern France.

== See also ==
- Communes of the Haute-Marne department
