= Vaillant, Haute-Marne =

Vaillant
- Commune
- Location of Vaillant
- Location within France Location within Grand Est
- Coordinates: 47°42′39″N 5°09′12″E
- Country: France
- Region: Grand Est
- Department: Haute-Marne
- Arrondissement: Langres
- Canton: Villegusien-le-Lac
- Intercommunality: Auberive Vingeanne et Montsaugeonnais

Government
  - Mayor (2020–2026): Patrice Dumartin
- Area^{1}: 7.5 km^{2} (2.9 sq mi)
- Elevation: 472 m (1,549 ft)
- Population (2023): 46
  - Density: 6.1/km^{2} (16/sq mi)
- Demonym(s): Vaillantais, Vaillantaises
- Time zone: UTC+01:00 (CET)
  - Summer (DST): UTC+02:00 (CEST)
- INSEE/Postal code: 52499 /52160
- ^{1} French Land Register data, which excludes lakes, ponds, glaciers > 1 km^{2} (0.386 sq mi or 247 acres) and river estuaries.

Vaillant (French pronunciation: [vajɑ̃]) is a commune in the Haute-Marne department in north-eastern France.

The village is located about 42 km north of Dijon on the Langres plateau, where the river Venelle, a tributary of the river Tille, has its source.

== See also ==
- Communes of the Haute-Marne department
