= Isômes =

- Commune
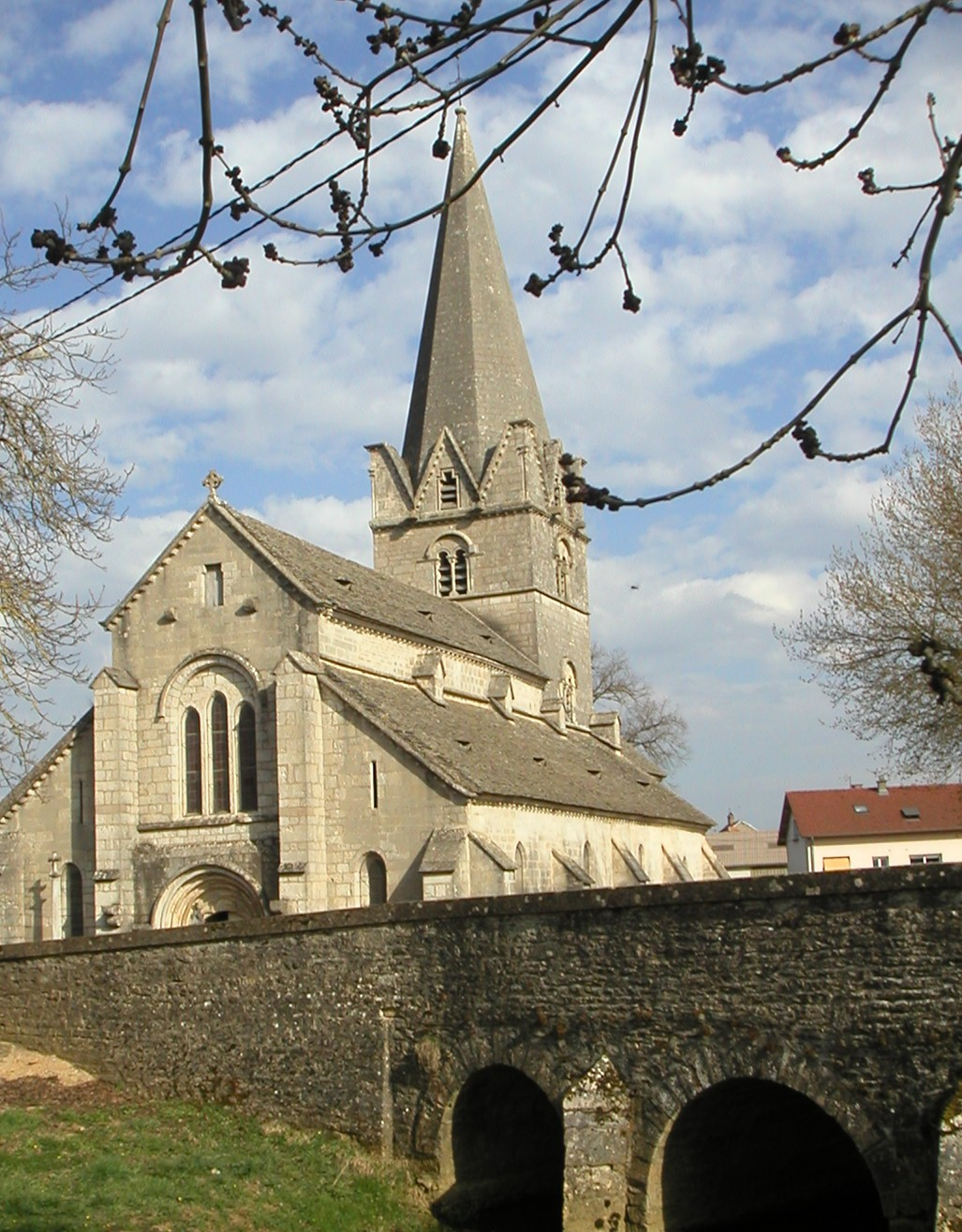
- The church in Isômes
- Location of Isômes
- Location within France Location within Grand Est
- Coordinates: 47°38′49″N 5°18′18″E
- Country: France
- Region: Grand Est
- Department: Haute-Marne
- Arrondissement: Langres
- Canton: Villegusien-le-Lac
- Intercommunality: Auberive Vingeanne et Montsaugeonnais

Government
  - Mayor (2020–2026): Nicolas Hérard
- Area^{1}: 10.63 km^{2} (4.10 sq mi)
- Elevation: 262 m (860 ft)
- Highest elevation: 321 m (1,053 ft)
- Lowest elevation: 256 m (840 ft)
- Population (2023): 146
  - Density: 13.7/km^{2} (35.6/sq mi)
- Demonym(s): Isômois, Isômoises
- Time zone: UTC+01:00 (CET)
  - Summer (DST): UTC+02:00 (CEST)
- INSEE/Postal code: 52249 /52190
- ^{1} French Land Register data, which excludes lakes, ponds, glaciers > 1 km^{2} (0.386 sq mi or 247 acres) and river estuaries.

Isômes (French pronunciation: [isom]) is a commune in the Haute-Marne department in north-eastern France.

== See also ==
- Communes of the Haute-Marne department
