= Poinsenot =

- Commune
- Location of Poinsenot
- Location within France Location within Grand Est
- Coordinates: 47°42′47″N 5°00′12″E
- Country: France
- Region: Grand Est
- Department: Haute-Marne
- Arrondissement: Langres
- Canton: Villegusien-le-Lac
- Intercommunality: Auberive Vingeanne et Montsaugeonnais

Government
  - Mayor (2020–2026): Dominique Caetano
- Area^{1}: 7.26 km^{2} (2.80 sq mi)
- Elevation: 405 m (1,329 ft)
- Highest elevation: 494 m (1,621 ft)
- Lowest elevation: 370 m (1,210 ft)
- Population (2023): 54
  - Density: 7.4/km^{2} (19/sq mi)
- Time zone: UTC+01:00 (CET)
  - Summer (DST): UTC+02:00 (CEST)
- INSEE/Postal code: 52393 /52160
- ^{1} French Land Register data, which excludes lakes, ponds, glaciers > 1 km^{2} (0.386 sq mi or 247 acres) and river estuaries.

Poinsenot (French pronunciation: [pwɛ̃sno]) is a commune in the Haute-Marne department in north-eastern France.

== See also ==
- Communes of the Haute-Marne department
