= Leuchey =

- Commune
- Location of Leuchey
- Location within France Location within Grand Est
- Coordinates: 47°43′45″N 5°12′51″E
- Country: France
- Region: Grand Est
- Department: Haute-Marne
- Arrondissement: Langres
- Canton: Villegusien-le-Lac
- Intercommunality: Auberive Vingeanne et Montsaugeonnais

Government
  - Mayor (2020–2026): Yoann Laurent
- Area^{1}: 5.48 km^{2} (2.12 sq mi)
- Elevation: 450 m (1,480 ft)
- Highest elevation: 482 m (1,581 ft)
- Lowest elevation: 352 m (1,155 ft)
- Population (2023): 70
  - Density: 13/km^{2} (33/sq mi)
- Time zone: UTC+01:00 (CET)
  - Summer (DST): UTC+02:00 (CEST)
- INSEE/Postal code: 52285 /52190
- ^{1} French Land Register data, which excludes lakes, ponds, glaciers > 1 km^{2} (0.386 sq mi or 247 acres) and river estuaries.

Leuchey (French pronunciation: [løʃɛ]) is a commune in the Haute-Marne department in north-eastern France.

== See also ==
- Communes of the Haute-Marne department
