= Rouelles =

- Commune
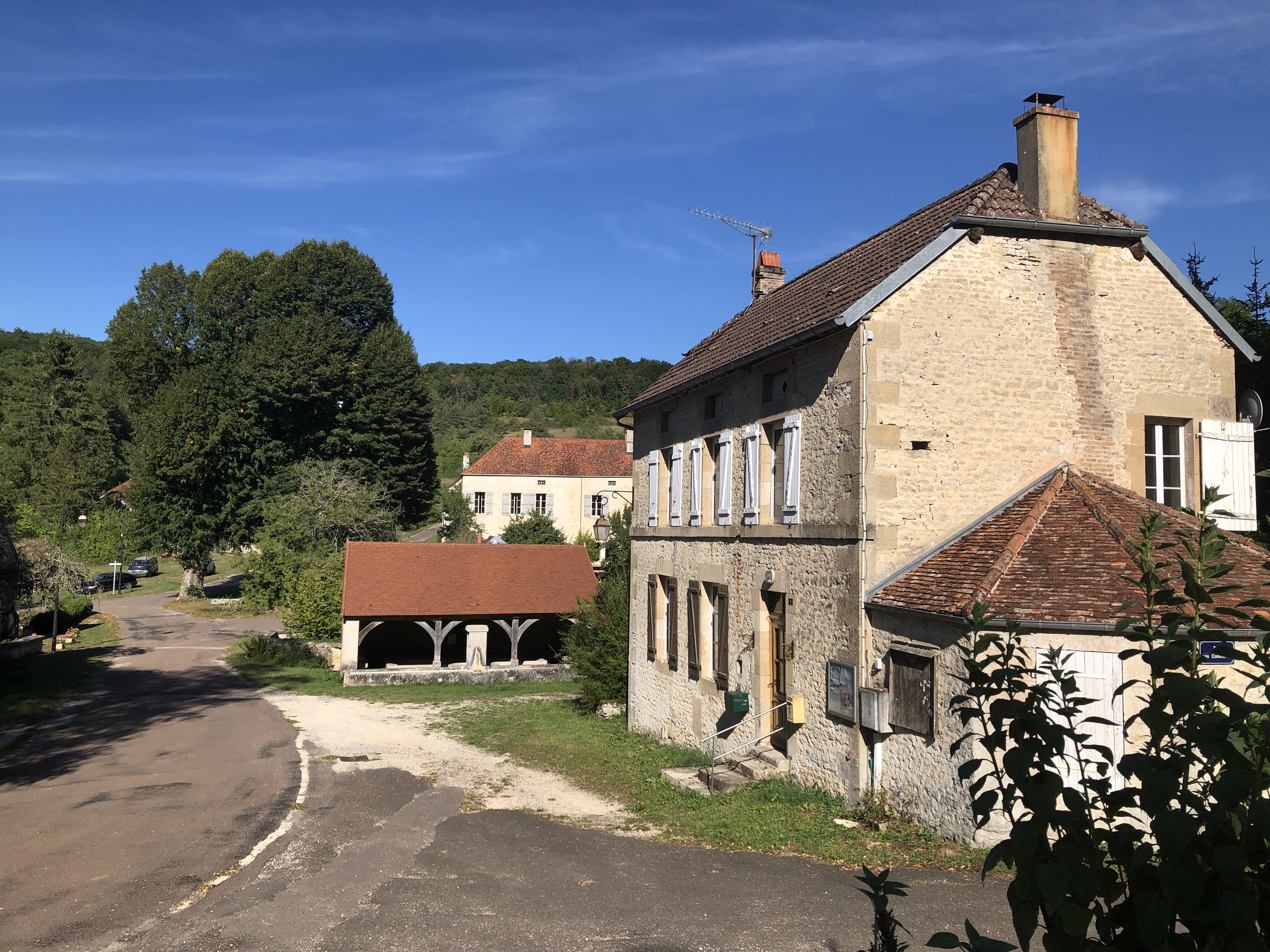
- Rouelles Town hall
- Location of Rouelles
- Location within France Location within Grand Est
- Coordinates: 47°48′20″N 5°05′25″E
- Country: France
- Region: Grand Est
- Department: Haute-Marne
- Arrondissement: Langres
- Canton: Villegusien-le-Lac
- Intercommunality: Auberive Vingeanne et Montsaugeonnais

Government
  - Mayor (2020–2026): Roland Mielle
- Area^{1}: 6.62 km^{2} (2.56 sq mi)
- Elevation: 355 m (1,165 ft)
- Highest elevation: 469 m (1,539 ft)
- Lowest elevation: 317 m (1,040 ft)
- Population (2023): 25
  - Density: 3.8/km^{2} (9.8/sq mi)
- Time zone: UTC+01:00 (CET)
  - Summer (DST): UTC+02:00 (CEST)
- INSEE/Postal code: 52437 /52160
- ^{1} French Land Register data, which excludes lakes, ponds, glaciers > 1 km^{2} (0.386 sq mi or 247 acres) and river estuaries.

Rouelles (French pronunciation: [ʁwɛl]) is a commune in the Haute-Marne department in north-eastern France.

== See also ==
- Communes of the Haute-Marne department
