= Vitry-en-Montagne =

- Commune
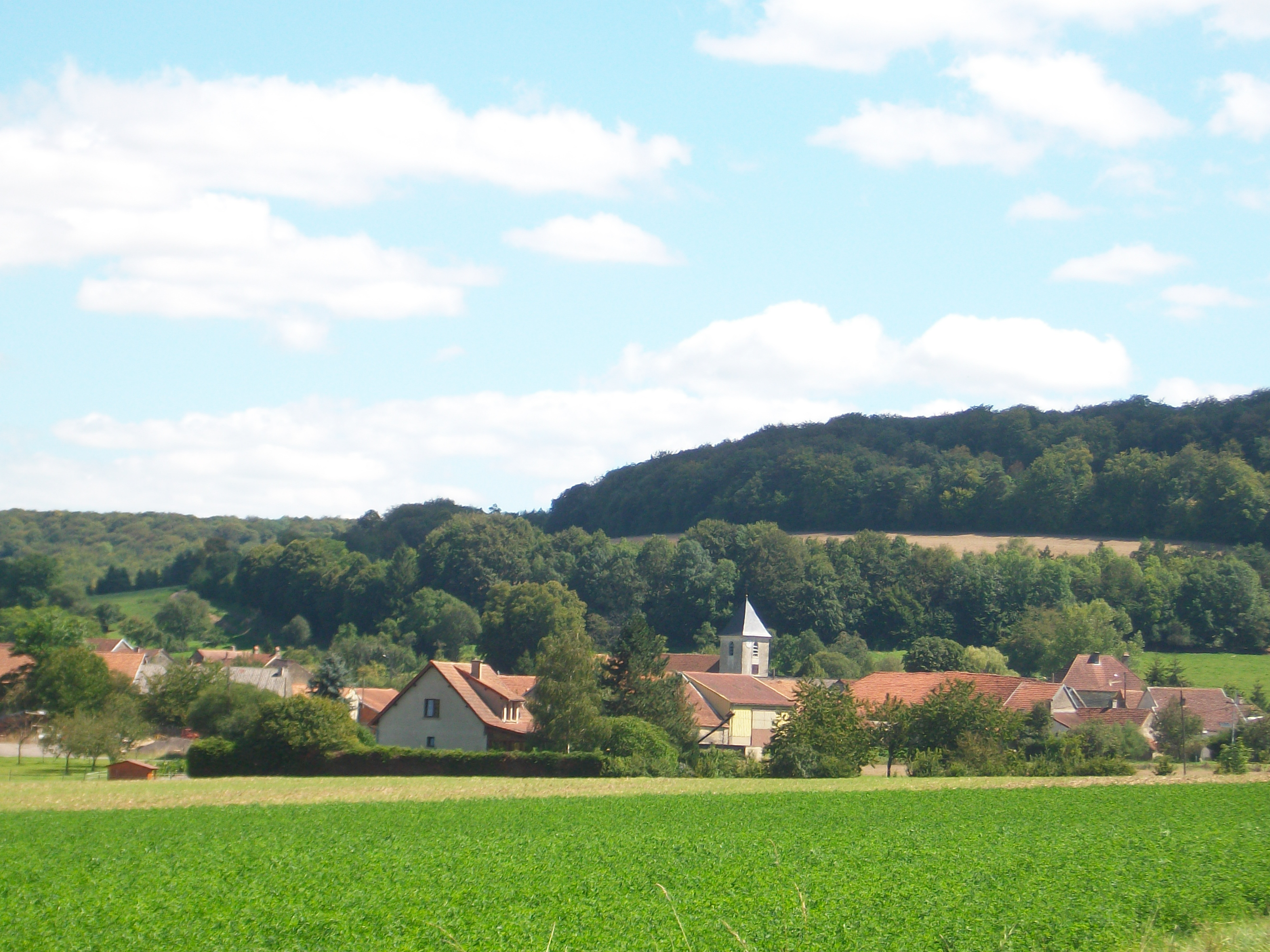
- A general view of Vitry-en-Montagne
- Location of Vitry-en-Montagne
- Location within France Location within Grand Est
- Coordinates: 47°49′38″N 5°05′17″E
- Country: France
- Region: Grand Est
- Department: Haute-Marne
- Arrondissement: Langres
- Canton: Villegusien-le-Lac
- Intercommunality: Auberive Vingeanne et Montsaugeonnais

Government
  - Mayor (2020–2026): Rémi Chauvirey
- Area^{1}: 9.53 km^{2} (3.68 sq mi)
- Elevation: 353 m (1,158 ft)
- Highest elevation: 475 m (1,558 ft)
- Lowest elevation: 315 m (1,033 ft)
- Population (2023): 33
  - Density: 3.5/km^{2} (9.0/sq mi)
- Time zone: UTC+01:00 (CET)
  - Summer (DST): UTC+02:00 (CEST)
- INSEE/Postal code: 52540 /52160
- ^{1} French Land Register data, which excludes lakes, ponds, glaciers > 1 km^{2} (0.386 sq mi or 247 acres) and river estuaries.

Vitry-en-Montagne (French pronunciation: [vitʁi ɑ̃ mɔ̃taɲ]) is a commune in the Haute-Marne department in north-eastern France.

== See also ==
- Communes of the Haute-Marne department
