= Arbot =

- Commune
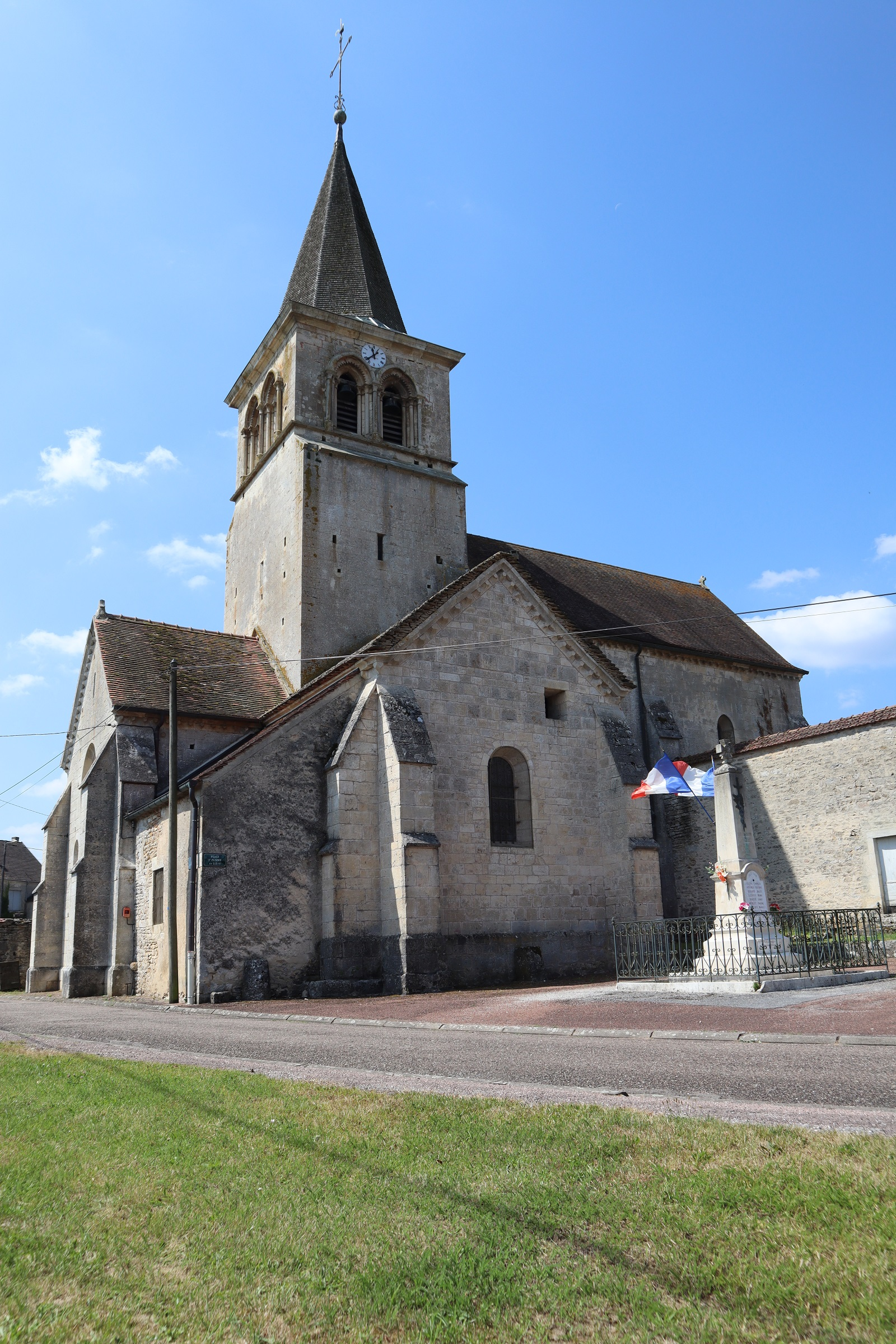
- The church in Arbot
- Location of Arbot
- Location within France Location within Grand Est
- Coordinates: 47°51′03″N 5°00′37″E
- Country: France
- Region: Grand Est
- Department: Haute-Marne
- Arrondissement: Langres
- Canton: Villegusien-le-Lac

Government
  - Mayor (2020–2026): Jean-Paul Bidaut
- Area^{1}: 13.15 km^{2} (5.08 sq mi)
- Elevation: 293 m (961 ft)
- Highest elevation: 429 m (1,407 ft)
- Lowest elevation: 282 m (925 ft)
- Population (2023): 60
  - Density: 4.6/km^{2} (12/sq mi)
- Time zone: UTC+01:00 (CET)
  - Summer (DST): UTC+02:00 (CEST)
- INSEE/Postal code: 52016 /52160
- ^{1} French Land Register data, which excludes lakes, ponds, glaciers > 1 km^{2} (0.386 sq mi or 247 acres) and river estuaries.

Arbot (French pronunciation: [aʁbo]) is a commune in the Haute-Marne department in the Grand Est region in northeastern France.

== Population ==
Historical population
Year	Pop.	±% p.a.
1968	133	—
1975	123	−1.11%
1982	109	−1.71%
1990	94	−1.83%
1999	82	−1.51%
2007	72	−1.61%
2012	69	−0.85%
2017	70	+0.29%
2023	60	−2.54%
Source: INSEE

== See also ==
- Communes of the Haute-Marne department
