= Flagey, Haute-Marne =

Flagey
- Commune
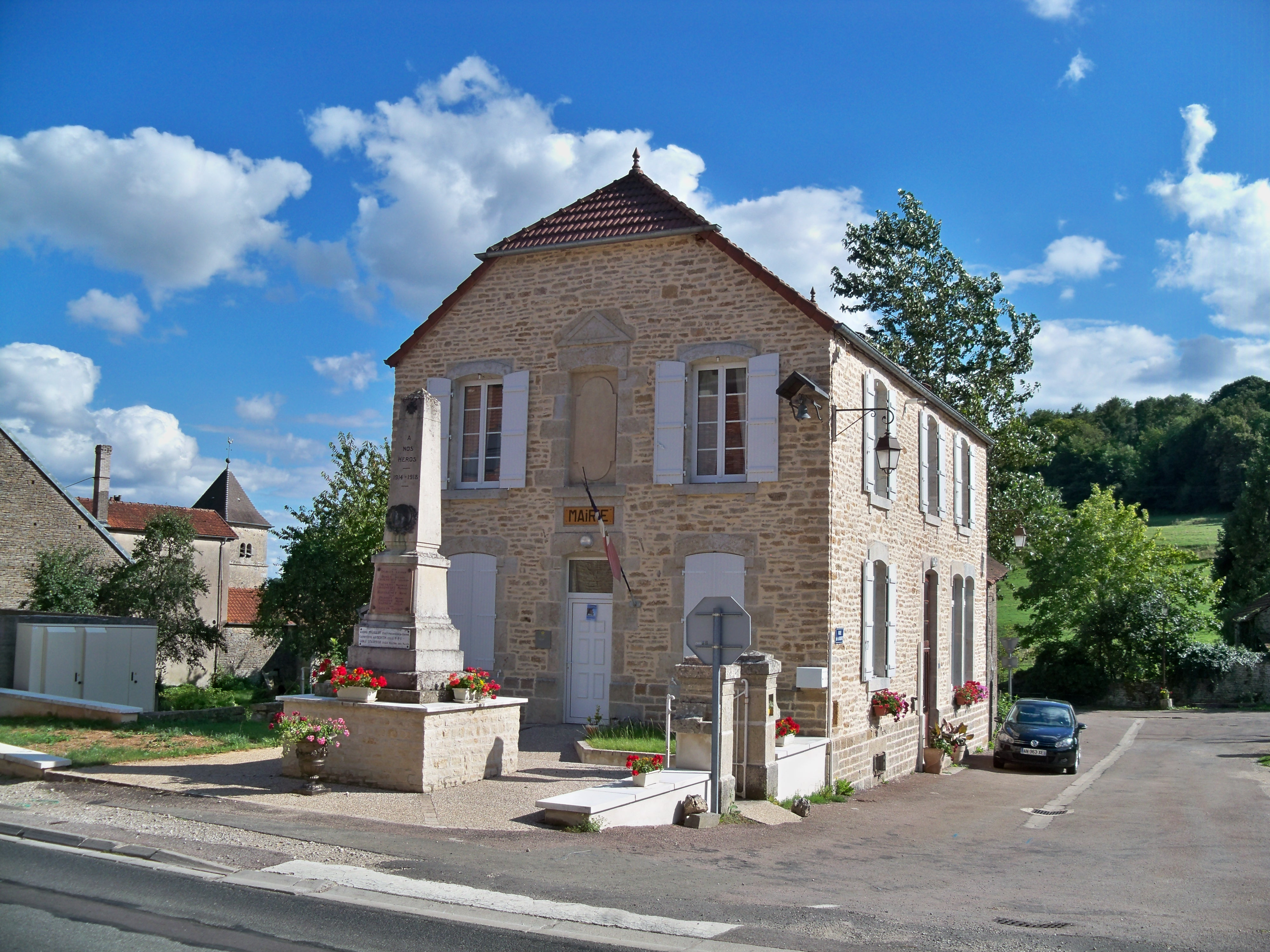
- The town hall in Flagey
- Location of Flagey
- Location within France Location within Grand Est
- Coordinates: 47°46′59″N 5°15′22″E
- Country: France
- Region: Grand Est
- Department: Haute-Marne
- Arrondissement: Langres
- Canton: Villegusien-le-Lac
- Intercommunality: Auberive Vingeanne et Montsaugeonnais

Government
  - Mayor (2020–2026): Sonia Guerard
- Area^{1}: 8.32 km^{2} (3.21 sq mi)
- Elevation: 450 m (1,480 ft)
- Highest elevation: 462 m (1,516 ft)
- Lowest elevation: 360 m (1,180 ft)
- Population (2023): 70
  - Density: 8.4/km^{2} (22/sq mi)
- Time zone: UTC+01:00 (CET)
  - Summer (DST): UTC+02:00 (CEST)
- INSEE/Postal code: 52200 /52250
- ^{1} French Land Register data, which excludes lakes, ponds, glaciers > 1 km^{2} (0.386 sq mi or 247 acres) and river estuaries.

Flagey (French pronunciation: [flaʒɛ]) is a commune in the Haute-Marne department in north-eastern France.

== See also ==
- Communes of the Haute-Marne department
