= Aujeurres =

- Commune
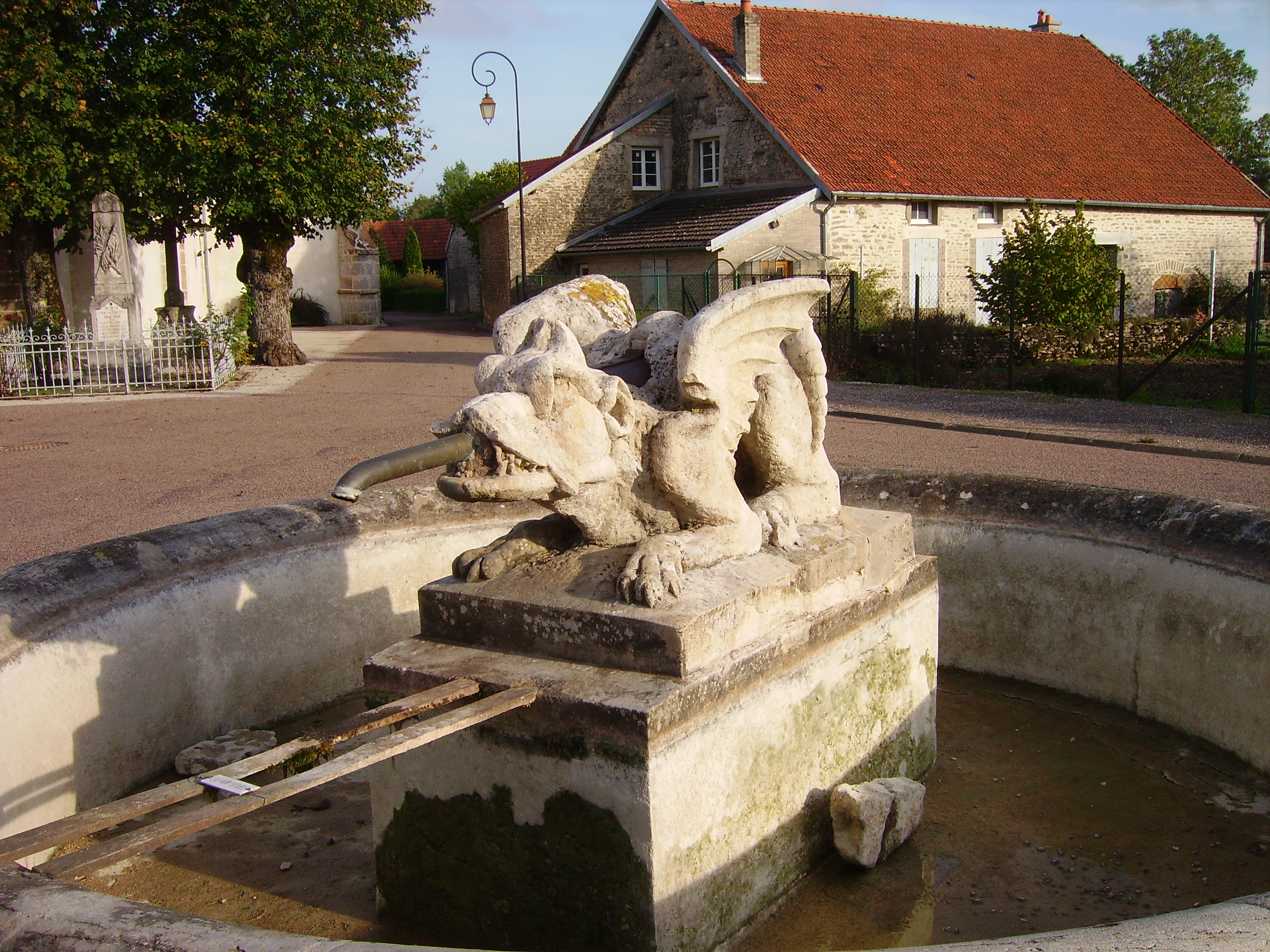
- A fountain in Aujeurres
- Location of Aujeurres
- Location within France Location within Grand Est
- Coordinates: 47°44′30″N 5°11′02″E
- Country: France
- Region: Grand Est
- Department: Haute-Marne
- Arrondissement: Langres
- Canton: Villegusien-le-Lac
- Intercommunality: CC Auberive Vingeanne Montsaugeonnais

Government
  - Mayor (2022–2026): Anita Bourrier
- Area^{1}: 12.94 km^{2} (5.00 sq mi)
- Elevation: 457 m (1,499 ft)
- Highest elevation: 509 m (1,670 ft)
- Lowest elevation: 408 m (1,339 ft)
- Population (2023): 73
  - Density: 5.6/km^{2} (15/sq mi)
- Time zone: UTC+01:00 (CET)
  - Summer (DST): UTC+02:00 (CEST)
- INSEE/Postal code: 52027 /52190
- ^{1} French Land Register data, which excludes lakes, ponds, glaciers > 1 km^{2} (0.386 sq mi or 247 acres) and river estuaries.

Aujeurres (French pronunciation: [oʒœʁ]) is a commune in the Haute-Marne department in the Grand Est region in northeastern France.

== Population ==
Historical population
Year	Pop.	±% p.a.
1968	99	—
1975	107	+1.12%
1982	108	+0.13%
1990	94	−1.72%
1999	56	−5.59%
2007	97	+7.11%
2012	79	−4.02%
2017	83	+0.99%
2023	73	−2.12%
Source: INSEE

== See also ==
- Communes of the Haute-Marne department
