= Rivière-les-Fosses =

- Commune
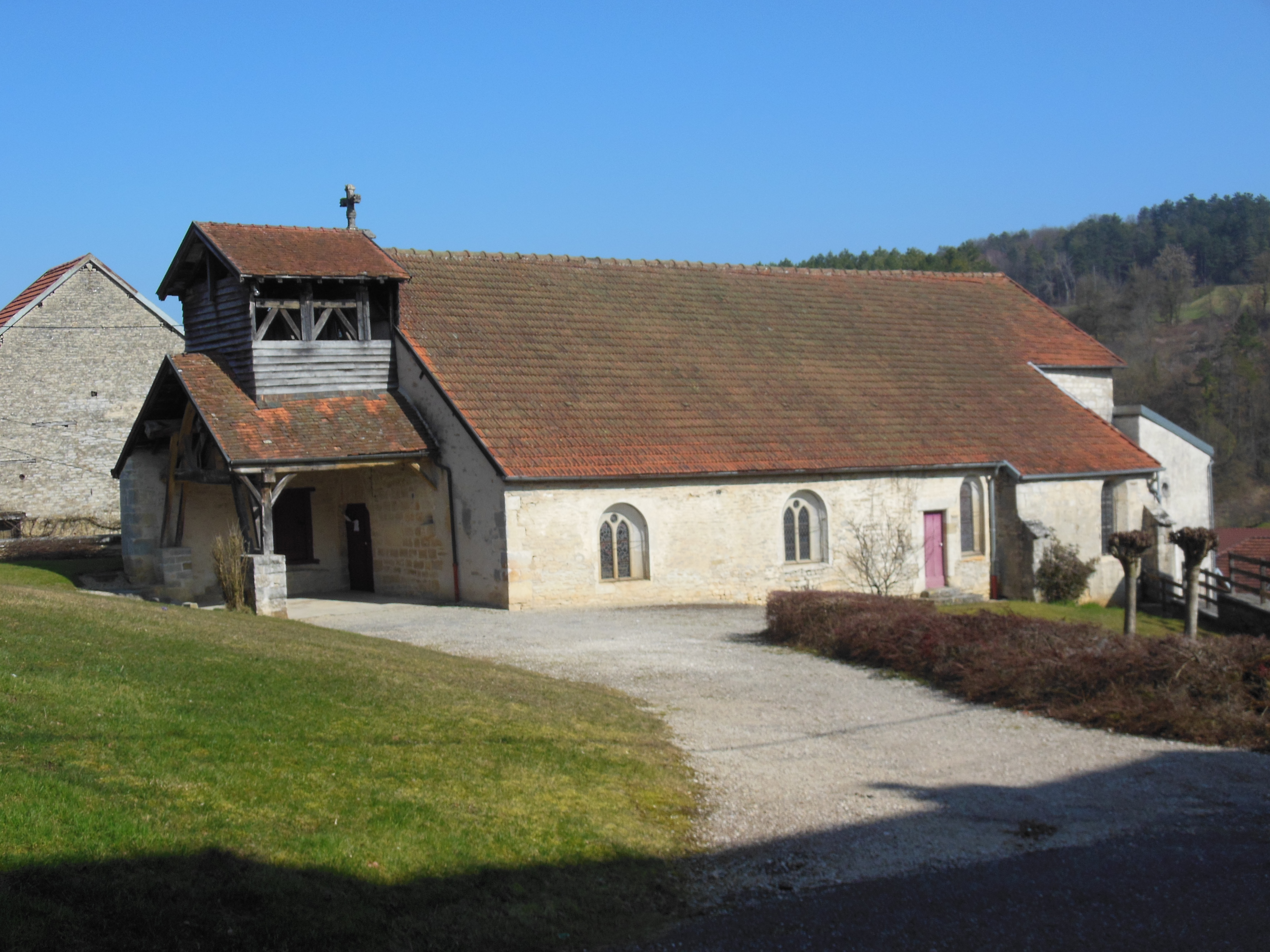
- The church in Rivière-les-Fosses

- Coat of arms
- Location of Rivière-les-Fosses
- Location within France Location within Grand Est
- Coordinates: 47°39′35″N 5°14′02″E
- Country: France
- Region: Grand Est
- Department: Haute-Marne
- Arrondissement: Langres
- Canton: Villegusien-le-Lac
- Intercommunality: Auberive Vingeanne et Montsaugeonnais

Government
  - Mayor (2021–2026): Édith Sellal
- Area^{1}: 17.94 km^{2} (6.93 sq mi)
- Elevation: 320 m (1,050 ft)
- Population (2023): 180
  - Density: 10/km^{2} (26/sq mi)
- Time zone: UTC+01:00 (CET)
  - Summer (DST): UTC+02:00 (CEST)
- INSEE/Postal code: 52425 /52190
- ^{1} French Land Register data, which excludes lakes, ponds, glaciers > 1 km^{2} (0.386 sq mi or 247 acres) and river estuaries.

Rivière-les-Fosses (French pronunciation: [ʁivjɛʁ le fos]) is a commune in the Haute-Marne department in north-eastern France.

== See also ==
- Communes of the Haute-Marne department
