= Canton of Villegusien-le-Lac =

Coordinates: 47.74°N 5.32°E

The canton of Villegusien-le-Lac is an administrative division of the Haute-Marne department, northeastern France. It was created at the French canton reorganisation which came into effect in March 2015. Its seat is in Villegusien-le-Lac.

It consists of the following communes:

1. Aprey
2. Arbot
3. Auberive
4. Aujeurres
5. Aulnoy-sur-Aube
6. Baissey
7. Bay-sur-Aube
8. Bourg
9. Brennes
10. Chalancey
11. Chassigny
12. Choilley-Dardenay
13. Cohons
14. Colmier-le-Bas
15. Colmier-le-Haut
16. Coublanc
17. Courcelles-en-Montagne
18. Cusey
19. Dommarien
20. Flagey
21. Germaines
22. Isômes
23. Leuchey
24. Longeau-Percey
25. Maâtz
26. Le Montsaugeonnais
27. Mouilleron
28. Noidant-le-Rocheux
29. Occey
30. Orcevaux
31. Perrogney-les-Fontaines
32. Poinsenot
33. Poinson-lès-Grancey
34. Praslay
35. Rivière-les-Fosses
36. Rochetaillée
37. Rouelles
38. Rouvres-sur-Aube
39. Saint-Broingt-les-Fosses
40. Saint-Loup-sur-Aujon
41. Ternat
42. Vaillant
43. Le Val-d'Esnoms
44. Vals-des-Tilles
45. Vauxbons
46. Verseilles-le-Bas
47. Verseilles-le-Haut
48. Vesvres-sous-Chalancey
49. Villars-Santenoge
50. Villegusien-le-Lac
51. Villiers-lès-Aprey
52. Vitry-en-Montagne
53. Vivey
54. Voisines
