= Cohons =

- Commune
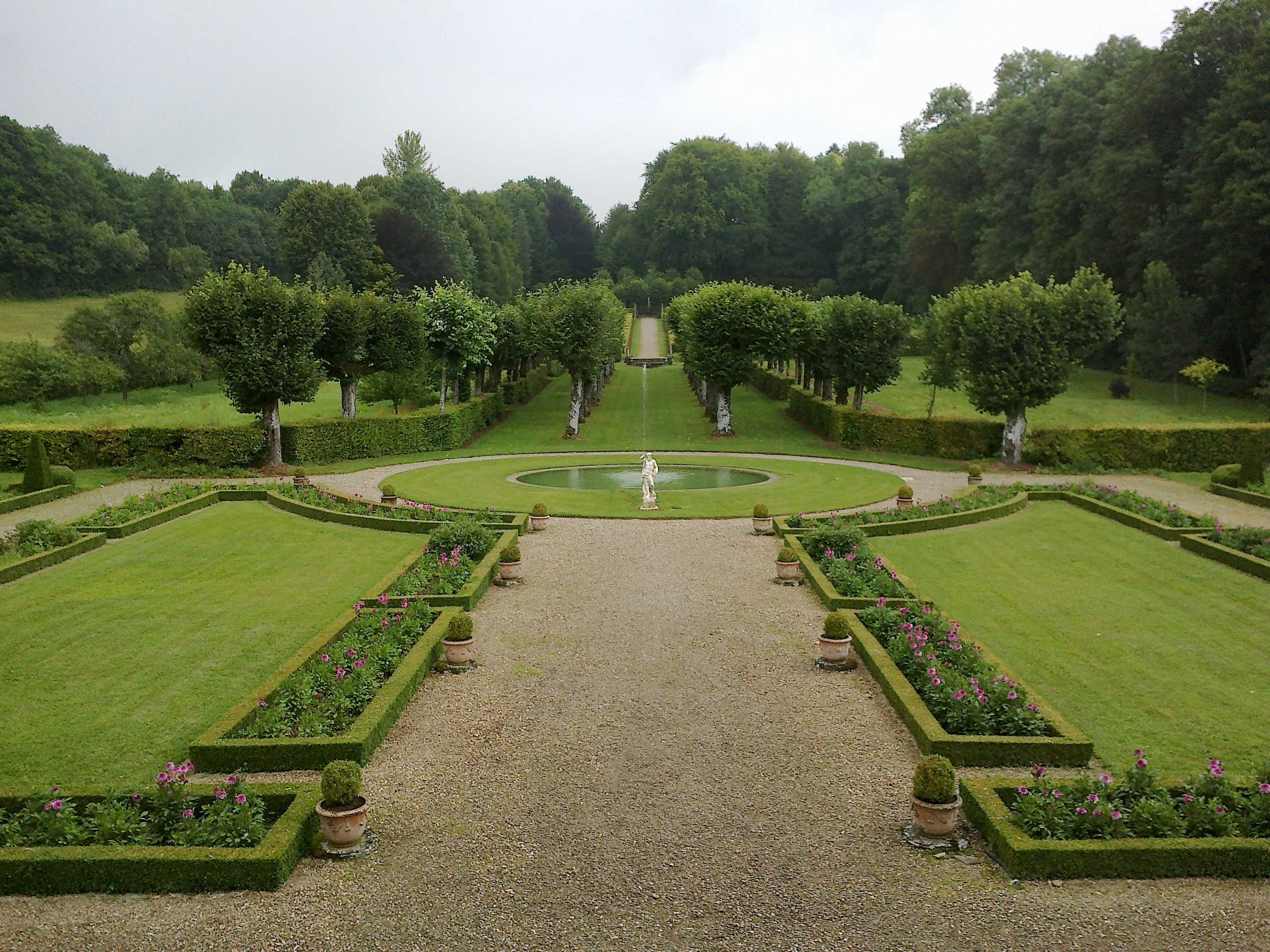
- The garden of Silière in Cohons
- Location of Cohons
- Location within France Location within Grand Est
- Coordinates: 47°47′17″N 5°20′47″E
- Country: France
- Region: Grand Est
- Department: Haute-Marne
- Arrondissement: Langres
- Canton: Villegusien-le-Lac
- Intercommunality: Auberive Vingeanne et Montsaugeonnais

Government
  - Mayor (2020–2026): Sylvie Baudot
- Area^{1}: 12.55 km^{2} (4.85 sq mi)
- Elevation: 314 m (1,030 ft)
- Highest elevation: 469 m (1,539 ft)
- Lowest elevation: 314 m (1,030 ft)
- Population (2023): 207
  - Density: 16.5/km^{2} (42.7/sq mi)
- Time zone: UTC+01:00 (CET)
  - Summer (DST): UTC+02:00 (CEST)
- INSEE/Postal code: 52134 /52600
- ^{1} French Land Register data, which excludes lakes, ponds, glaciers > 1 km^{2} (0.386 sq mi or 247 acres) and river estuaries.

Cohons (French pronunciation: [kɔɔ̃]) is a commune in the Haute-Marne department in north-eastern France.

== See also ==
- Communes of the Haute-Marne department
