= Choilley-Dardenay =

- Commune
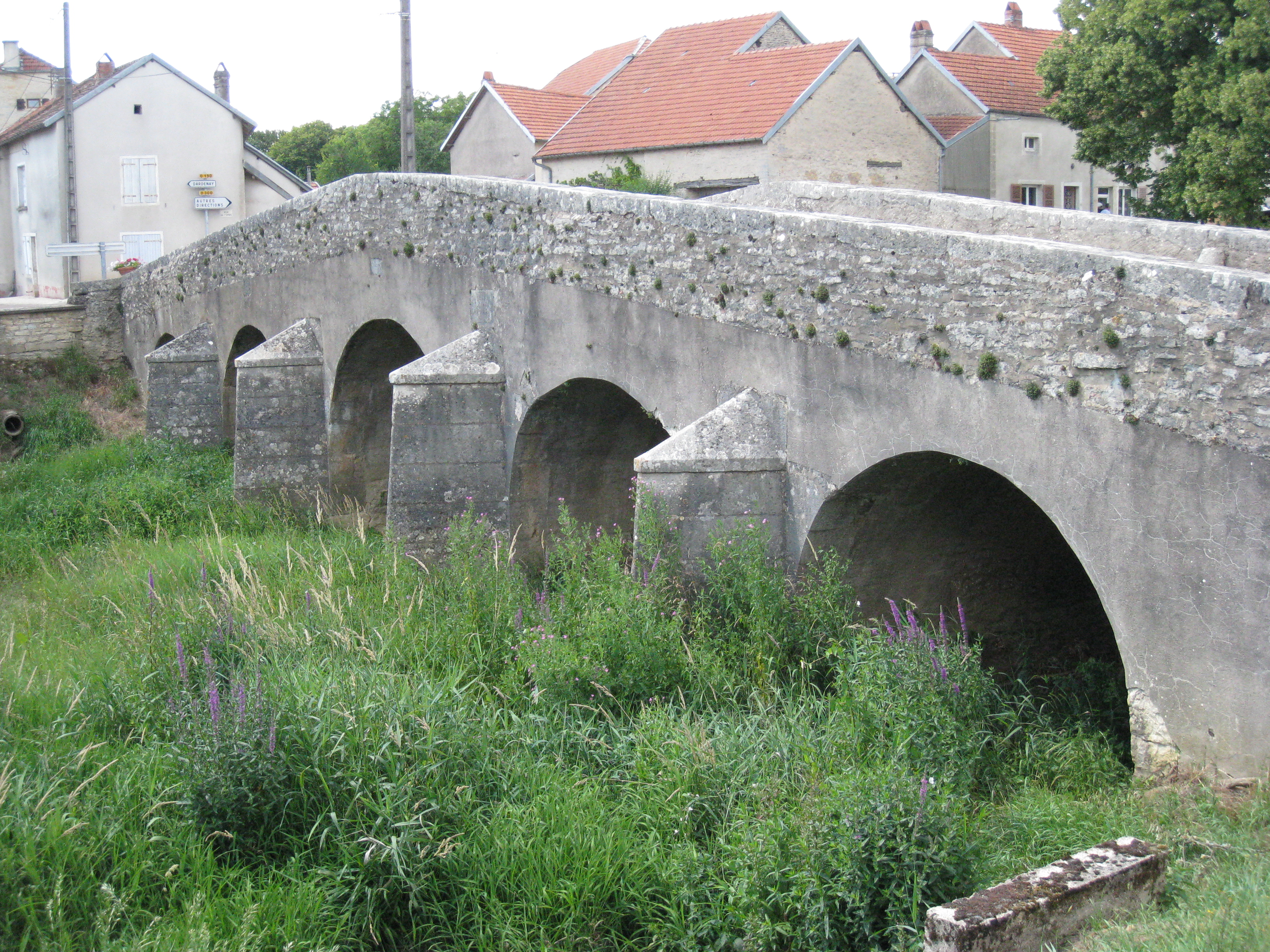
- The bridge in Choilley
- Location of Choilley-Dardenay
- Location within France Location within Grand Est
- Coordinates: 47°39′52″N 5°21′16″E
- Country: France
- Region: Grand Est
- Department: Haute-Marne
- Arrondissement: Langres
- Canton: Villegusien-le-Lac
- Intercommunality: Auberive Vingeanne et Montsaugeonnais

Government
  - Mayor (2020–2026): Bernard Chaudouet
- Area^{1}: 17.56 km^{2} (6.78 sq mi)
- Elevation: 285 m (935 ft)
- Population (2023): 162
  - Density: 9.23/km^{2} (23.9/sq mi)
- Time zone: UTC+01:00 (CET)
  - Summer (DST): UTC+02:00 (CEST)
- INSEE/Postal code: 52126 /52190
- ^{1} French Land Register data, which excludes lakes, ponds, glaciers > 1 km^{2} (0.386 sq mi or 247 acres) and river estuaries.

Choilley-Dardenay (French pronunciation: [ʃwajɛ daʁdənɛ]) is a commune in the Haute-Marne department in north-eastern France.

== See also ==
- Communes of the Haute-Marne department
