= Voisines, Haute-Marne =

Voisines
- Commune
- Location of Voisines
- Location within France Location within Grand Est
- Coordinates: 47°51′35″N 5°11′04″E
- Country: France
- Region: Grand Est
- Department: Haute-Marne
- Arrondissement: Langres
- Canton: Villegusien-le-Lac
- Intercommunality: Grand Langres

Government
  - Mayor (2020–2026): Roland Floquet
- Area^{1}: 19.08 km^{2} (7.37 sq mi)
- Elevation: 405 m (1,329 ft)
- Highest elevation: 485 m (1,591 ft)
- Lowest elevation: 362 m (1,188 ft)
- Population (2023): 98
  - Density: 5.1/km^{2} (13/sq mi)
- Demonym(s): Vesignois, Vesignoises
- Time zone: UTC+01:00 (CET)
  - Summer (DST): UTC+02:00 (CEST)
- INSEE/Postal code: 52545 /52200
- ^{1} French Land Register data, which excludes lakes, ponds, glaciers > 1 km^{2} (0.386 sq mi or 247 acres) and river estuaries.

Voisines (French pronunciation: [vwazin]) is a commune in the Haute-Marne department in north-eastern France.

== See also ==
- Communes of the Haute-Marne department
