= Aprey =

- Commune
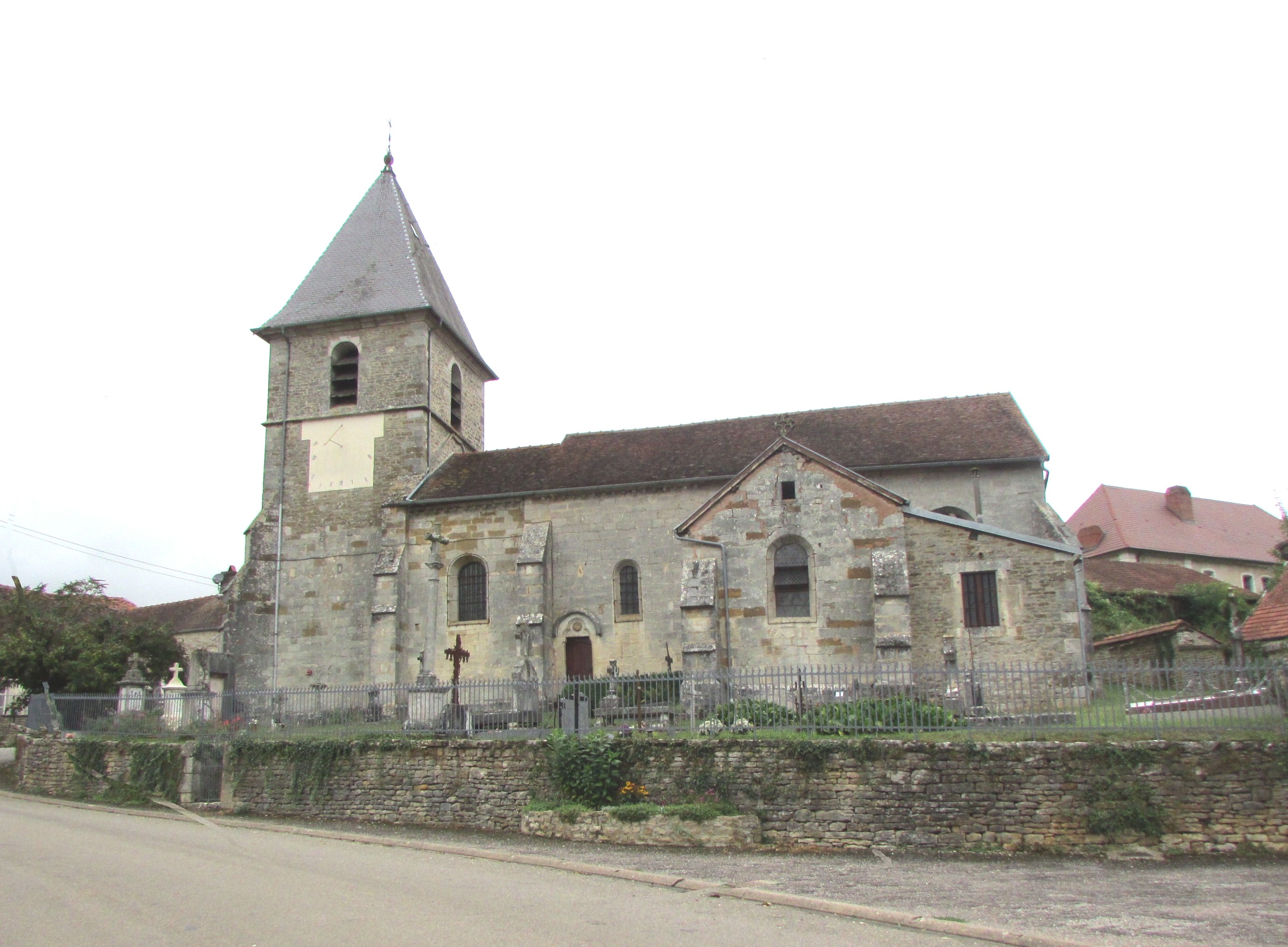
- The church in Aprey
- Location of Aprey
- Location within France Location within Grand Est
- Coordinates: 47°45′58″N 5°13′25″E
- Country: France
- Region: Grand Est
- Department: Haute-Marne
- Arrondissement: Langres
- Canton: Villegusien-le-Lac

Government
  - Mayor (2020–2026): Laurent Aubertot
- Area^{1}: 15.72 km^{2} (6.07 sq mi)
- Elevation: 400 m (1,300 ft)
- Highest elevation: 522 m (1,713 ft)
- Lowest elevation: 341 m (1,119 ft)
- Population (2023): 187
  - Density: 11.9/km^{2} (30.8/sq mi)
- Time zone: UTC+01:00 (CET)
  - Summer (DST): UTC+02:00 (CEST)
- INSEE/Postal code: 52014 /52250
- ^{1} French Land Register data, which excludes lakes, ponds, glaciers > 1 km^{2} (0.386 sq mi or 247 acres) and river estuaries.

Aprey (French pronunciation: [apʁɛ]) is a commune in the Haute-Marne department in the Grand Est region in northeastern France.

The commune is famous for its faience. Aprey Faience was produced at a glass-works at Aprey, set up in 1744 by Jacques Lallemont de Villehaut, Baron d'Aprey. The factory closed in 1885.

== Population ==
Historical population
Year	Pop.	±% p.a.
1968	205	—
1975	185	−1.46%
1982	199	+1.05%
1990	171	−1.88%
1999	188	+1.06%
2007	190	+0.13%
2012	187	−0.32%
2017	187	+0.00%
2023	187	+0.00%
Source: INSEE

== See also ==
- Communes of the Haute-Marne department
