= Aulnoy-sur-Aube =

- Commune
- Location of Aulnoy-sur-Aube
- Location within France Location within Grand Est
- Coordinates: 47°50′01″N 5°02′01″E
- Country: France
- Region: Grand Est
- Department: Haute-Marne
- Arrondissement: Langres
- Canton: Villegusien-le-Lac
- Intercommunality: CC Auberive Vingeanne Montsaugeonnais

Government
  - Mayor (2021–2026): Sébastien Odin
- Area^{1}: 9.31 km^{2} (3.59 sq mi)
- Elevation: 350 m (1,150 ft)
- Highest elevation: 446 m (1,463 ft)
- Lowest elevation: 297 m (974 ft)
- Population (2023): 51
  - Density: 5.5/km^{2} (14/sq mi)
- Time zone: UTC+01:00 (CET)
  - Summer (DST): UTC+02:00 (CEST)
- INSEE/Postal code: 52028 /52160
- ^{1} French Land Register data, which excludes lakes, ponds, glaciers > 1 km^{2} (0.386 sq mi or 247 acres) and river estuaries.

Aulnoy-sur-Aube (French pronunciation: [o(l)nwa syʁ ob]) is a commune in the Haute-Marne department in the Grand Est region in northeastern France.

== Population ==
Historical population
Year	Pop.	±% p.a.
1968	40	—
1975	47	+2.33%
1982	57	+2.79%
1990	49	−1.87%
1999	47	−0.46%
2007	62	+3.52%
2012	54	−2.73%
2017	51	−1.14%
2023	51	+0.00%
Source: INSEE

== See also ==
- Communes of the Haute-Marne department
