= Bourg, Haute-Marne =

Bourg
- Commune
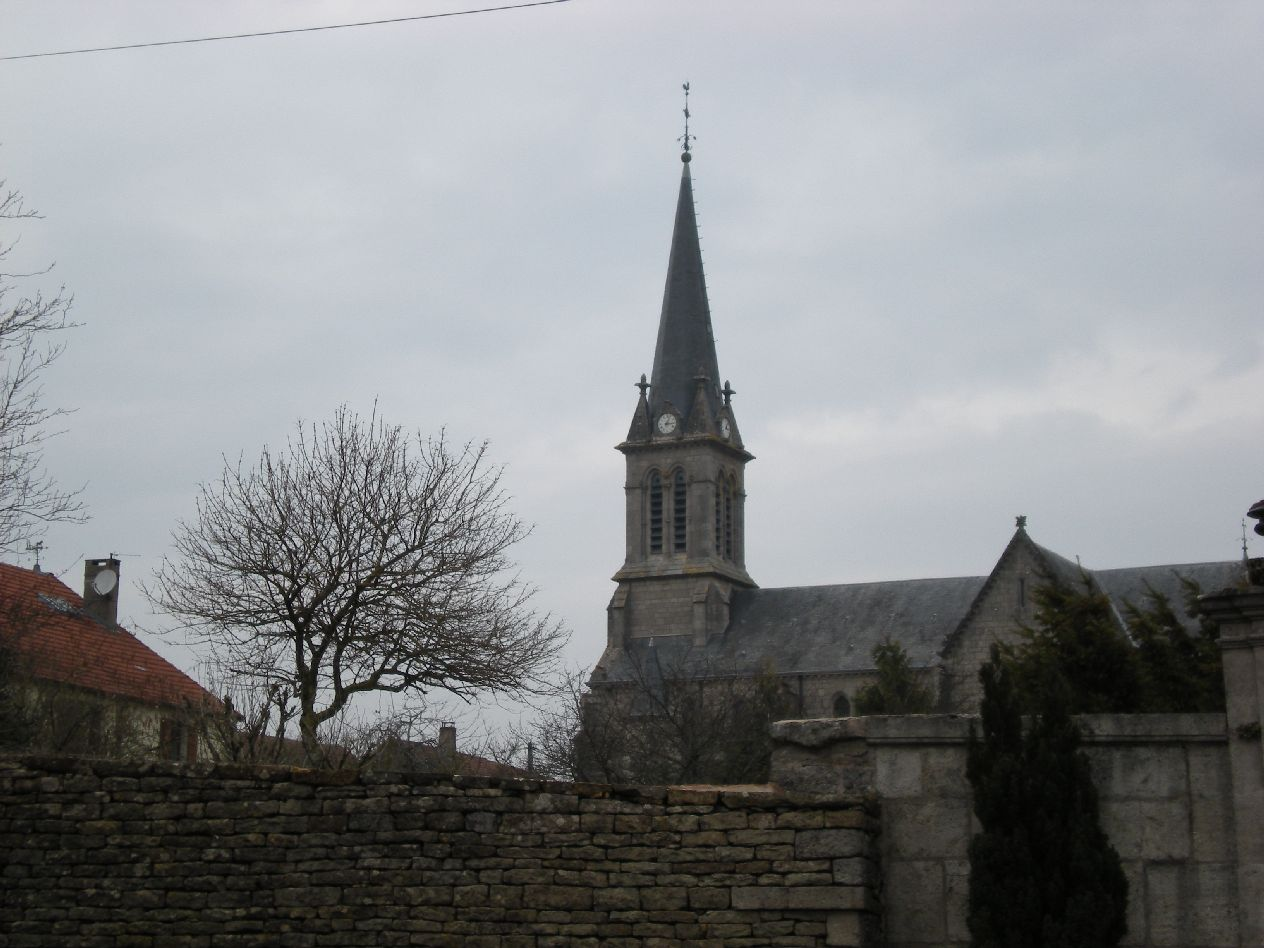
- The church in Bourg
- Location of Bourg
- Location within France Location within Grand Est
- Coordinates: 47°47′42″N 5°18′43″E
- Country: France
- Region: Grand Est
- Department: Haute-Marne
- Arrondissement: Langres
- Canton: Villegusien-le-Lac

Government
  - Mayor (2020–2026): Dominique Thiébaud
- Area^{1}: 7.23 km^{2} (2.79 sq mi)
- Elevation: 459 m (1,506 ft)
- Highest elevation: 463 m (1,519 ft)
- Lowest elevation: 317 m (1,040 ft)
- Population (2023): 178
  - Density: 24.6/km^{2} (63.8/sq mi)
- Time zone: UTC+01:00 (CET)
  - Summer (DST): UTC+02:00 (CEST)
- INSEE/Postal code: 52062 /52200
- ^{1} French Land Register data, which excludes lakes, ponds, glaciers > 1 km^{2} (0.386 sq mi or 247 acres) and river estuaries.

Bourg (French pronunciation: [buʁ]) is a commune in the Haute-Marne department in northeastern France.

== Population ==
Historical population
Year	Pop.	±% p.a.
1968	115	—
1975	112	−0.38%
1982	139	+3.13%
1990	165	+2.17%
1999	151	−0.98%
2007	148	−0.25%
2012	151	+0.40%
2017	156	+0.65%
2023	178	+2.22%
Source: INSEE

== See also ==
- Communes of the Haute-Marne department
