= Longeau-Percey =

- Commune
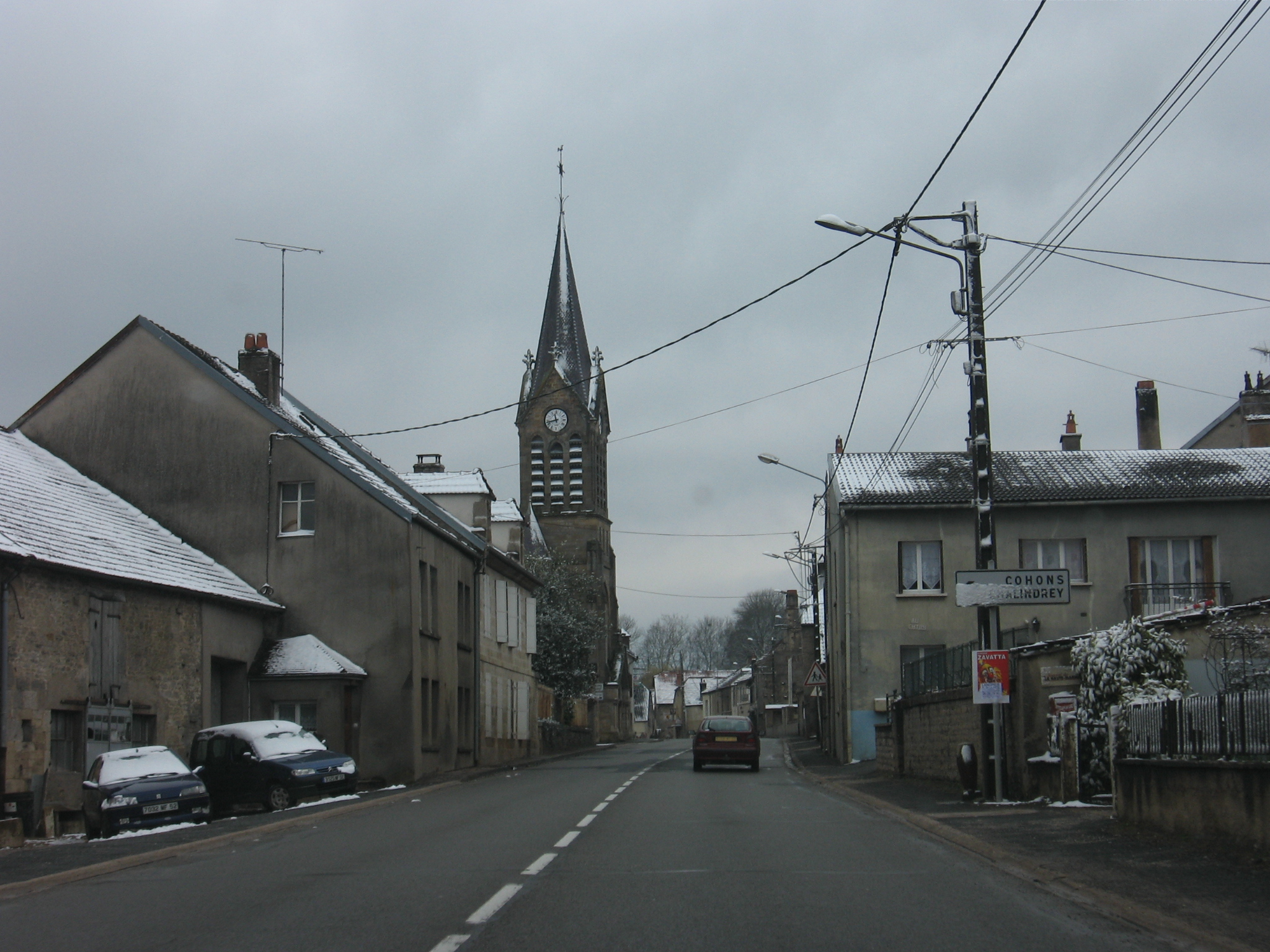
- The church and surroundings in Longeau

- Coat of arms
- Location of Longeau-Percey
- Location within France Location within Grand Est
- Coordinates: 47°46′05″N 5°18′41″E
- Country: France
- Region: Grand Est
- Department: Haute-Marne
- Arrondissement: Langres
- Canton: Villegusien-le-Lac
- Intercommunality: Auberive Vingeanne et Montsaugeonnais

Government
  - Mayor (2020–2026): Isabelle Miot
- Area^{1}: 7.48 km^{2} (2.89 sq mi)
- Elevation: 320 m (1,050 ft)
- Highest elevation: 403 m (1,322 ft)
- Lowest elevation: 299 m (981 ft)
- Population (2023): 688
  - Density: 92.0/km^{2} (238/sq mi)
- Time zone: UTC+01:00 (CET)
  - Summer (DST): UTC+02:00 (CEST)
- INSEE/Postal code: 52292 /52250
- ^{1} French Land Register data, which excludes lakes, ponds, glaciers > 1 km^{2} (0.386 sq mi or 247 acres) and river estuaries.

Longeau-Percey (French pronunciation: [lɔ̃ʒo pɛʁsɛ]) is a commune in the Haute-Marne department in north-eastern France. It was created in 1972 by the merger of two former communes: Percey-le-Pautel and Longeau, initially under the name Le Vallinot.

== See also ==
- Communes of the Haute-Marne department
