= Mouilleron =

- Commune
- Location of Mouilleron
- Location within France Location within Grand Est
- Coordinates: 47°41′33″N 5°06′36″E
- Country: France
- Region: Grand Est
- Department: Haute-Marne
- Arrondissement: Langres
- Canton: Villegusien-le-Lac
- Intercommunality: Auberive Vingeanne et Montsaugeonnais

Government
  - Mayor (2020–2026): Jérôme Sauvageot
- Area^{1}: 5.19 km^{2} (2.00 sq mi)
- Elevation: 395 m (1,296 ft)
- Highest elevation: 465 m (1,526 ft)
- Lowest elevation: 345 m (1,132 ft)
- Population (2023): 29
  - Density: 5.6/km^{2} (14/sq mi)
- Demonym(s): Mouilleronnais, Mouilleronnaises
- Time zone: UTC+01:00 (CET)
  - Summer (DST): UTC+02:00 (CEST)
- INSEE/Postal code: 52344 /52160
- ^{1} French Land Register data, which excludes lakes, ponds, glaciers > 1 km^{2} (0.386 sq mi or 247 acres) and river estuaries.

Mouilleron (French pronunciation: [mujʁɔ̃]) is a commune in the Haute-Marne department in north-eastern France.

== See also ==
- Communes of the Haute-Marne department
