= Chalancey =

- Commune
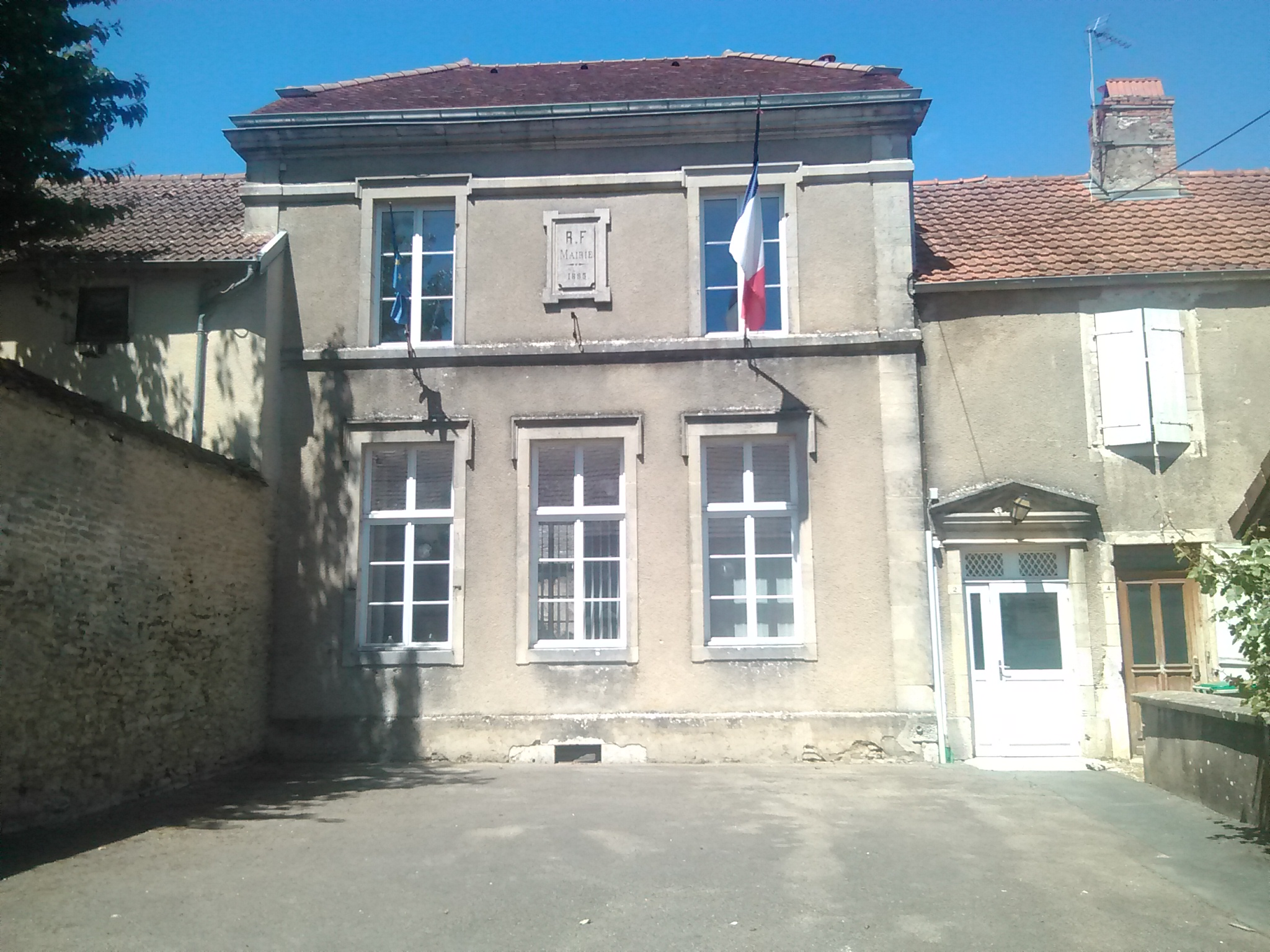
- The town hall in Chalancey

- Coat of arms
- Location of Chalancey
- Location within France Location within Grand Est
- Coordinates: 47°40′40″N 5°08′27″E
- Country: France
- Region: Grand Est
- Department: Haute-Marne
- Arrondissement: Langres
- Canton: Villegusien-le-Lac
- Intercommunality: Auberive Vingeanne et Montsaugeonnais

Government
  - Mayor (2020–2026): Sabine Perchikoff
- Area^{1}: 13.49 km^{2} (5.21 sq mi)
- Elevation: 476 m (1,562 ft)
- Population (2023): 121
  - Density: 8.97/km^{2} (23.2/sq mi)
- Time zone: UTC+01:00 (CET)
  - Summer (DST): UTC+02:00 (CEST)
- INSEE/Postal code: 52092 /52160
- ^{1} French Land Register data, which excludes lakes, ponds, glaciers > 1 km^{2} (0.386 sq mi or 247 acres) and river estuaries.

Chalancey (French pronunciation: [ʃalɑ̃sɛ]) is a commune in the Haute-Marne department in north-eastern France.

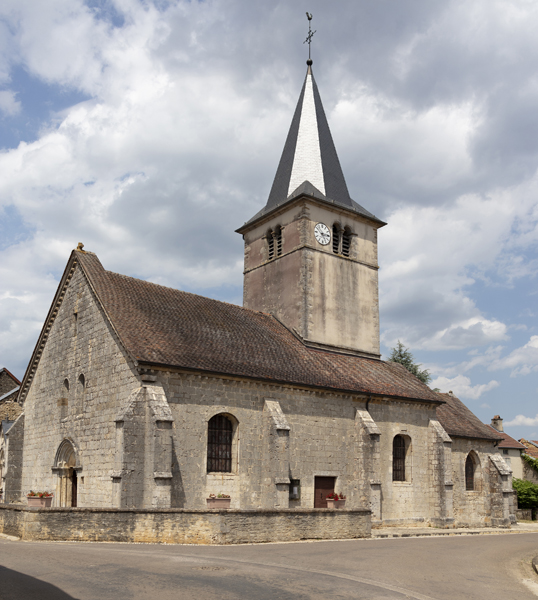
Church of Chalancey

== See also ==
- Communes of the Haute-Marne department
