= Verseilles-le-Haut =

- Commune
- Location of Verseilles-le-Haut
- Location within France Location within Grand Est
- Coordinates: 47°46′14″N 5°17′55″E
- Country: France
- Region: Grand Est
- Department: Haute-Marne
- Arrondissement: Langres
- Canton: Villegusien-le-Lac
- Intercommunality: Auberive Vingeanne et Montsaugeonnais

Government
  - Mayor (2020–2026): Patricia Miquée
- Area^{1}: 2.83 km^{2} (1.09 sq mi)
- Elevation: 440 m (1,440 ft)
- Highest elevation: 452 m (1,483 ft)
- Lowest elevation: 309 m (1,014 ft)
- Population (2023): 46
  - Density: 16/km^{2} (42/sq mi)
- Time zone: UTC+01:00 (CET)
  - Summer (DST): UTC+02:00 (CEST)
- INSEE/Postal code: 52516 /52250
- ^{1} French Land Register data, which excludes lakes, ponds, glaciers > 1 km^{2} (0.386 sq mi or 247 acres) and river estuaries.

Verseilles-le-Haut (French pronunciation: [vɛʁsɛj lə o]) is a commune in the Haute-Marne department in north-eastern France.

== See also ==
- Communes of the Haute-Marne department
