= Verseilles-le-Bas =

- Commune
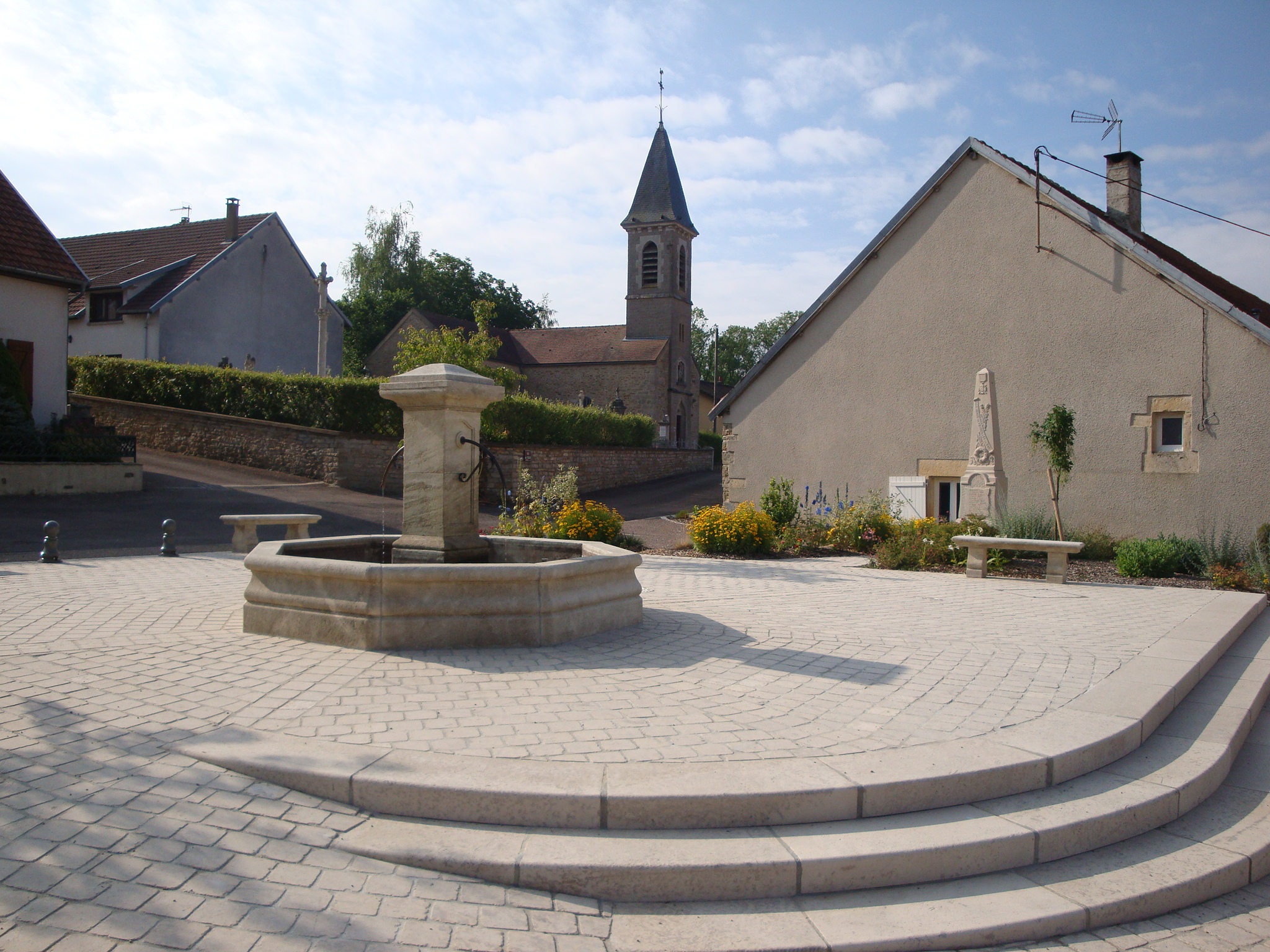
- The Place Saint-Martin in Verseilles-le-Bas
- Location of Verseilles-le-Bas
- Location within France Location within Grand Est
- Coordinates: 47°45′50″N 5°17′30″E
- Country: France
- Region: Grand Est
- Department: Haute-Marne
- Arrondissement: Langres
- Canton: Villegusien-le-Lac
- Intercommunality: Auberive Vingeanne et Montsaugeonnais

Government
  - Mayor (2020–2026): Marie-Josèphe Delaitre
- Area^{1}: 1.58 km^{2} (0.61 sq mi)
- Elevation: 320 m (1,050 ft)
- Highest elevation: 431 m (1,414 ft)
- Lowest elevation: 310 m (1,020 ft)
- Population (2023): 109
  - Density: 69.0/km^{2} (179/sq mi)
- Time zone: UTC+01:00 (CET)
  - Summer (DST): UTC+02:00 (CEST)
- INSEE/Postal code: 52515 /52250
- ^{1} French Land Register data, which excludes lakes, ponds, glaciers > 1 km^{2} (0.386 sq mi or 247 acres) and river estuaries.

Verseilles-le-Bas (French pronunciation: [vɛʁsɛj lə ba]) is a commune in the Haute-Marne department in north-eastern France.

== See also ==
- Communes of the Haute-Marne department
