= Châtenay =

Châtenay or Chatenay is the name or part of the name of several communes in France:

- Châtenay, in the Ain département
- Châtenay, in the Eure-et-Loir département
- Châtenay, in the Isère département
- Châtenay, in the Saône-et-Loire département
- Châtenay-en-France, in the Val-d'Oise département
- Châtenay-Malabry, in the Hauts-de-Seine département
- Châtenay-sur-Seine, in the Seine-et-Marne département
- Chatenay-Vaudin, in the Haute-Marne département
- Chatenay-Mâcheron, in the Haute-Marne département
