= Humes =

Humes may refer to:

- Humes, former name of Hume, Fresno County, California
- Humes (surname), people with the surname Humes
- Humes-Jorquenay, France
- Humes High School, in Memphis, Tennessee
- Humes, a fictitious measurement of reality stability in the SCP Foundation
