= Balesmes-sur-Marne =

- Part of Saints-Geosmes
- Location of Balesmes-sur-Marne
- Location within France Location within Grand Est
- Coordinates: 47°49′20″N 5°22′26″E
- Country: France
- Region: Grand Est
- Department: Haute-Marne
- Arrondissement: Langres
- Canton: Langres
- Commune: Saints-Geosmes
- Area^{1}: 12.67 km^{2} (4.89 sq mi)
- Elevation: 370 m (1,210 ft)
- Highest elevation: 472 m (1,549 ft)
- Lowest elevation: 348 m (1,142 ft)
- Population (2023): 237
  - Density: 18.7/km^{2} (48.4/sq mi)
- Time zone: UTC+01:00 (CET)
  - Summer (DST): UTC+02:00 (CEST)
- Postal code: 52200
- ^{1} French Land Register data, which excludes lakes, ponds, glaciers > 1 km^{2} (0.386 sq mi or 247 acres) and river estuaries.

Balesmes-sur-Marne (French pronunciation: [balɛm syʁ maʁn]) is a former commune in the Haute-Marne department in the Champagne-Ardenne region in northeastern France. On 1 January 2016, it was merged into the commune Saints-Geosmes.

== See also ==
- Communes of the Haute-Marne department
