= Jean Étienne Feytou =

French musicologist

Jean Étienne Feytou (1742 in Saint-Martin-lès-Langres – 2 May 1816) was a French musicologist. Feytou became a priest at the death of his wife (1789) and devoted himself to music research. In this capacity, he contributed articles on music for the Encyclopédie méthodique by French publisher Charles Joseph Panckoucke.

He became the parish priest of Champigny-lès-Langres in 1815 where he died in 1816. He is buried in Champigny cemetery.

== See also ==
- Municipal bulletin No 19 of the commune of Champigny-lès-Langres.
- Article by Lucien Gallion Boisselier "Au siècle des Lumières, un homme hors du commun, Jean-Étienne Feytou", Bulletin de la Société Historique et Archéologique de Langres, 4th trimestre 1983, TXVIII, No 273, (pp. 170-178).
