= Lunar Flag Assembly =

Nylon banner and aluminum staff used on the Apollo Moon landings

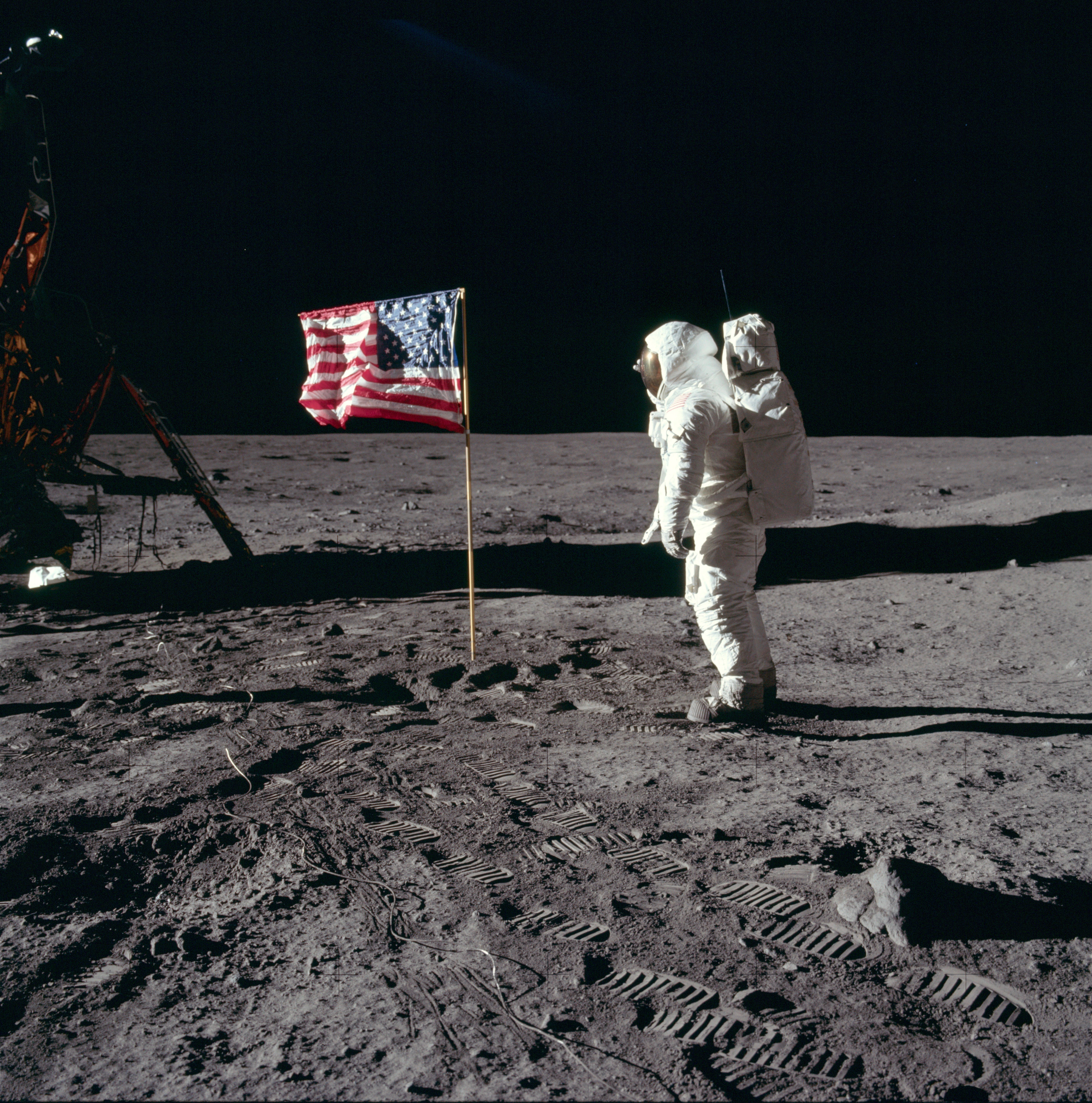
Buzz Aldrin salutes the first American flag erected on the Moon, July 21, 1969 (photo by Neil Armstrong).

The Lunar Flag Assembly (LFA) was a kit containing a flag of the United States designed to be erected on the Moon during the Apollo program. Six such flag assemblies were planted on the Moon. The nylon flags were hung on telescoping staffs and horizontal bars constructed of one-inch anodized aluminum tubes.

The flags were carried on the outside of the Apollo Lunar Module (LM), most of them on the descent ladder inside a thermally insulated tubular case to protect them from exhaust gas temperatures calculated to reach 2,000 °F (1,090 °C). The assembly was designed and supervised by Jack Kinzler, head of technical services at the Manned Spacecraft Center (MSC) in Houston, Texas. Six of the flags (including one for Apollo 13 which was not planted on the Moon) were ordered from a government supply catalog and measured 3 by 5 feet (0.91 by 1.52 m); the last one planted on the Moon was the slightly larger, 6-foot (1.8 m)-wide flag which had hung in the MSC Mission Operations Control Room for most of the Apollo program.

== Background ==
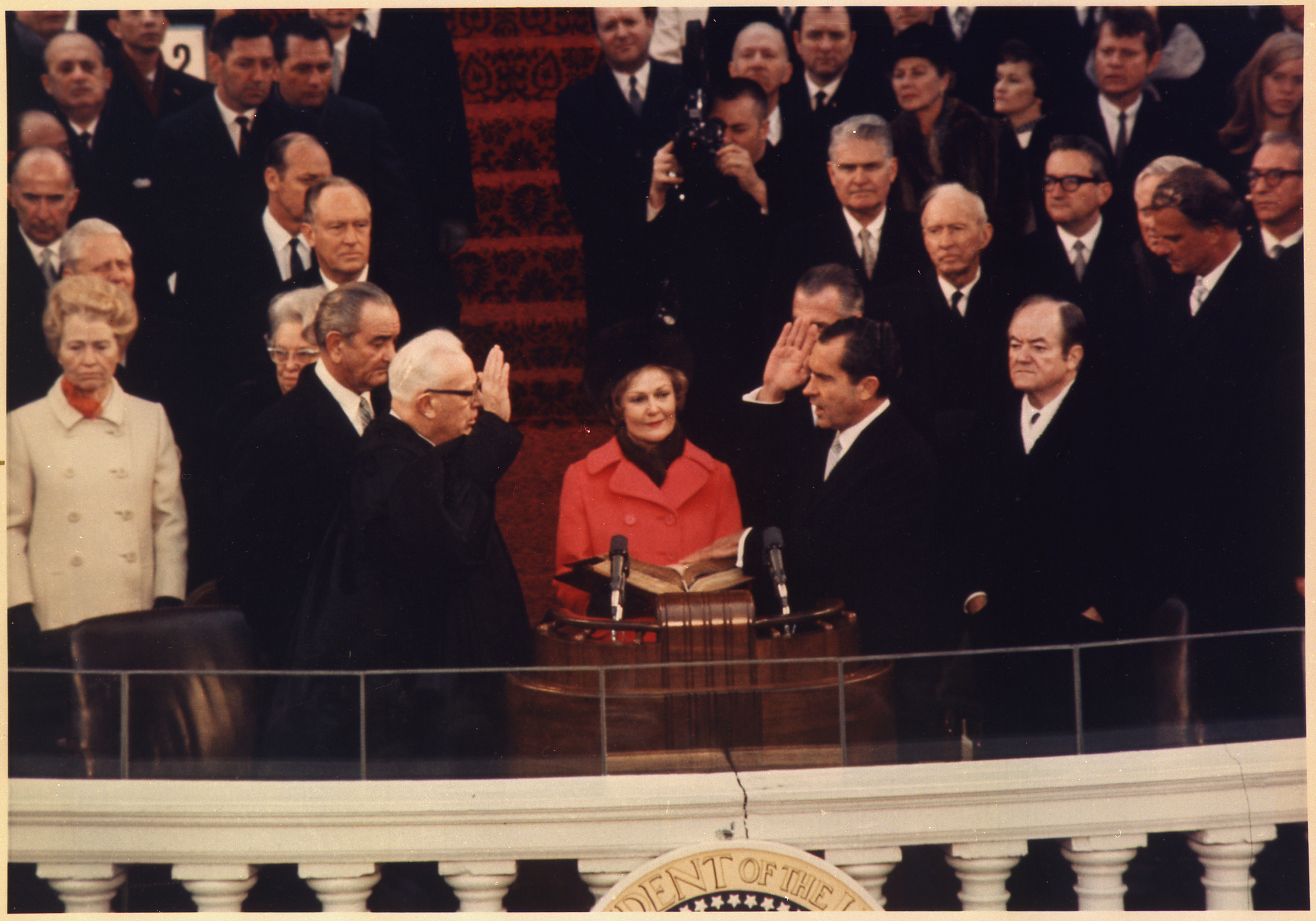
Richard Nixon during the 1969 inauguration

Building on President John F. Kennedy's 1961 plan to land a man on the Moon in the 1960s and bring him safely back to Earth, in January 1969 President Richard Nixon set an international tone for the Apollo program in his inaugural address:

As we explore the reaches of space, let us go to the new worlds together – not as new worlds to be conquered, but as a new adventure to be shared.

This inspired an idea within NASA to have astronauts plant a United Nations flag on the first landing. Officials at NASA were surveyed, and the overwhelming consensus was to plant an American flag. The American public was canvassed and supported the idea. Deke Slayton was fine with leaving symbolic items on the Moon as long as they did not affect the crew's training schedule and that the items met dimensional and weight requirements. Acting NASA administrator Thomas O. Paine created the Committee on Symbolic Activities for the First Lunar Landing and appointed Willis Shapley as the chair on February 25. Paine instructed the committee to select symbolic activities that would not jeopardize crew safety or interfere with mission objectives; that would "signalize the first lunar landing as an historic forward step of all mankind that has been accomplished by the United States", and that would not give the impression that the United States, like colonial powers raising flags to mark territorial claims, was "taking possession of the moon" in violation of the Outer Space Treaty of 1967.

The committee was to decide on three things: items to be brought to the Moon and left there, items to be attached to the descent module, and items to be taken to the Moon and back to Earth. For items to be left on the Moon, the committee considered several options, including leaving the UN flag, a United States flag, a set of miniature flags of all nations, and another commemorative marker on the surface. The committee solicited suggestions from the Smithsonian Institution, the Library of Congress, the Archivist of the United States, the NASA Historical Advisory Committee, the Space Council, and congressional committees. The most common proposal among those solicited was to plant a flag.

The committee recommended planting the U.S. flag on the Moon. They also recommended installing a plaque onto the lunar module (LM) descent stage (which would be left on the Moon) bearing the inscription: "Here men from the planet Earth first set foot upon the Moon July 1969, A.D. We came in peace for all mankind."

=== Legal requirements ===
Some Americans anticipated possible controversy over planting the United States flag on the Moon, since the Outer Space Treaty prohibited territorial claims to any extraterrestrial body. Since it was made clear the United States had no intention of making a territorial claim to the Moon, no serious controversy materialized. Four months after the Apollo 11 landing, the United States Congress passed a bill in November 1969, which was signed into law by President Nixon, stating:

The flag of the United States, and no other flag, shall be implanted or otherwise placed on the surface of the moon, or on the surface of any planet, by members of the crew of any spacecraft ... as part of any mission ... the funds for which are provided entirely by the Government of the United States. ... this act is intended as a symbolic gesture of national pride in achievement and is not to be construed as a declaration of national appropriation by claim of sovereignty.

== Design ==
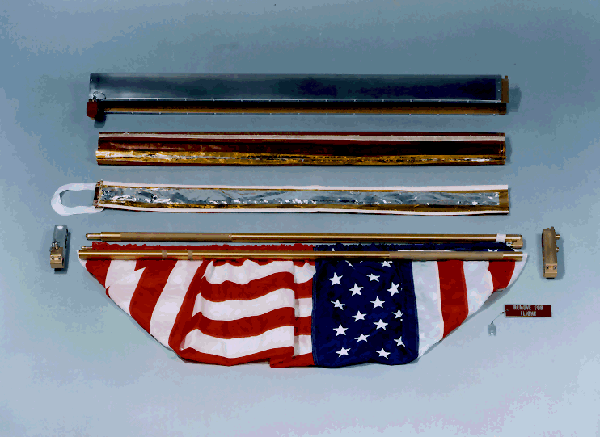
The first Lunar Flag Assembly, carried on Apollo 11, prior to packing and mounting on the Apollo Lunar Module ladder

About three months prior to the July 1969 Apollo 11 mission, Robert Gilruth, director of the MSC and a member of the Committee on Symbolic Activities, still needed to select someone to design the flag assembly. He asked Jack Kinzler, head of technical services at MSC, also known as "Mr. Fix It", to take on the task. Inspired by the memory of his mother hanging curtains during his childhood, Kinzler came up with the idea of inserting a horizontal pole through a hemmed pocket in the top of the flag to support it. This would make it appear to fly on the airless Moon as it would float in the wind on Earth. He worked out the details over several days, assisted by Deputy Division Chief Dave McCraw. Kinzler also suggested, designed, and oversaw the creation of the commemorative plaques affixed to the Apollo Lunar Modules.

Though the flag itself was a simple, government supply 3-by-5-foot (0.91 by 1.52 m) nylon flag altered only by sewing the top hem, its packaging, tolerance of environmental conditions, and means of deployment presented minor engineering challenges. The horizontal and vertical poles were each made of one-inch aluminum tubes in two telescoping parts, anodized with a gold color. Due to the limits of the astronauts' spacesuits, the total height of the flagpole was limited to their 28-inch (71 cm) minimum and 66-inch (170 cm) maximum reach. The flag cost $5.50 and the tubing cost $75.

Though Annin & Co. is generally accepted to be the manufacturer of the flags used in the Lunar Flag Assemblies and is cited as such by NASA, there is some uncertainty about the manufacturer; according to a NASA contractor report published in the 1990s, labels and bindings were removed from the flags to make them easier to attach to the aluminium staff, thus removing any identifying information about the company that produced the flags.

The assembly had to be designed with the astronauts' physical limitations in mind. Because of their thick spacesuits, the astronauts had limited range of motion and manual dexterity. The flag assembly was designed to work within those limitations.

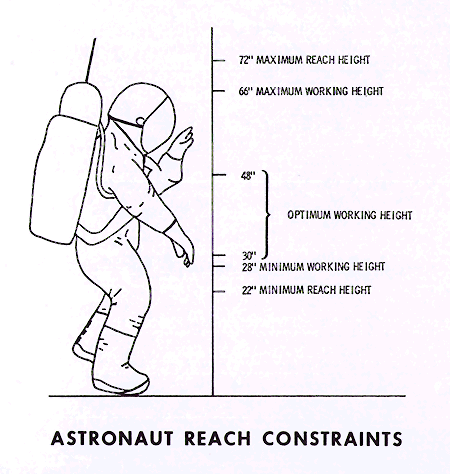
Diagram showing the astronauts' vertical range of motion

The flag assembly was stored immediately behind the left side of the LM ladder. Due to the heat of the exhaust from the descent engine, temperatures were calculated to be 250 °F (121 °C) for most of the landing, however they would increase to 2,000 °F (1,090 °C) during the final 13 seconds at touchdown. To insulate the flag from these extreme conditions, it had to be packed inside a dual-walled protective shroud consisting of a stainless steel outer case separated from an aluminum layer by Thermoflex insulation, with several layers of Kapton thermal insulation foil between the inner case and the flag. The insulation limited the temperature to which the flag was subjected to 180 °F (82 °C). The shroud was estimated to cost several hundred dollars. The flags deployed on the last three landing flights were carried in the Modular Equipment Stowage Assembly (MESA, an equipment drawer which opened from the side of the Lunar Module) rather than on the ladder. This eliminated the need for the thermal protection shroud.

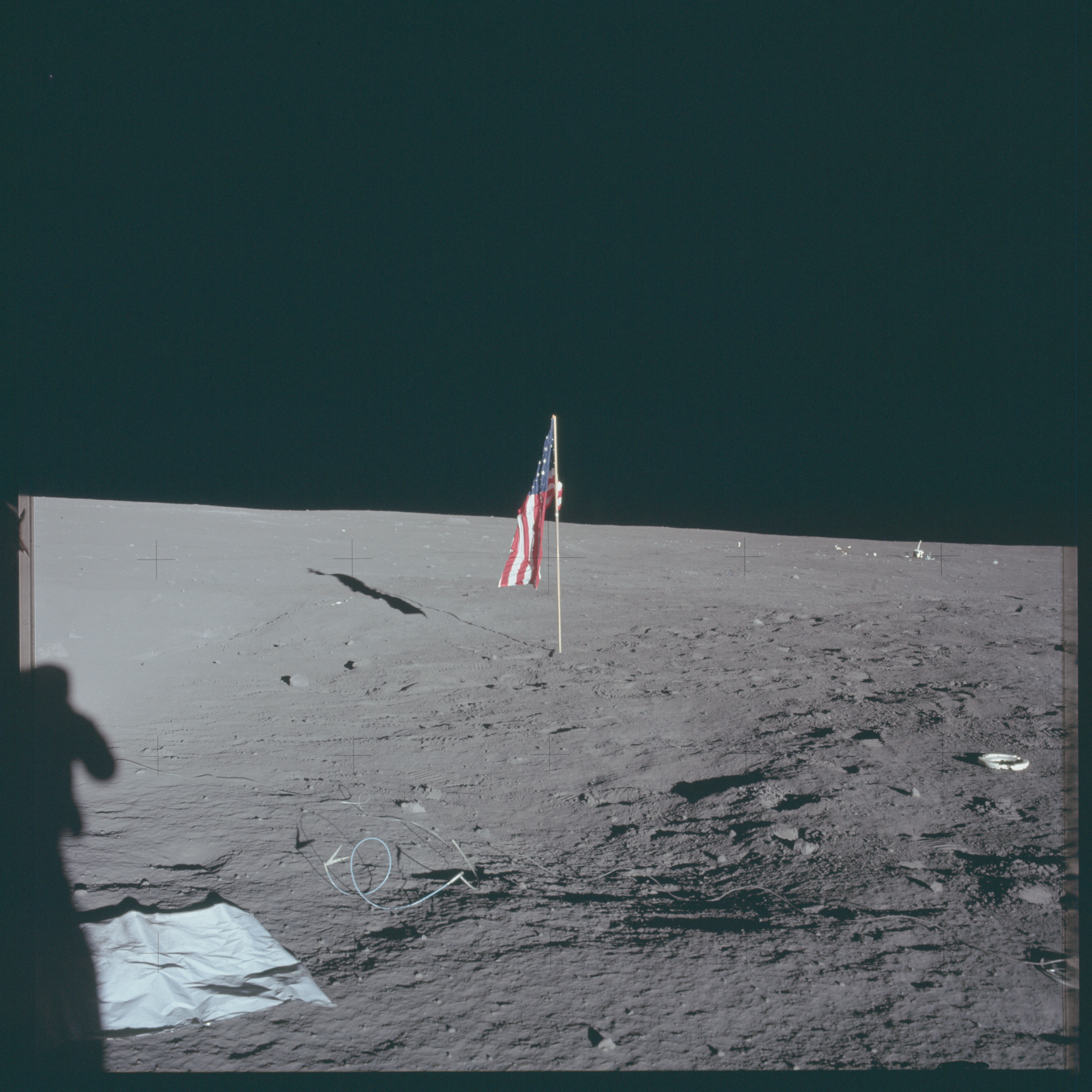
Apollo 12 flag with faulty latch mechanism

The complete package needed to be as light as possible so as not to cut into the lunar payload and weighed 9 pounds 7 ounces (4.3 kg).

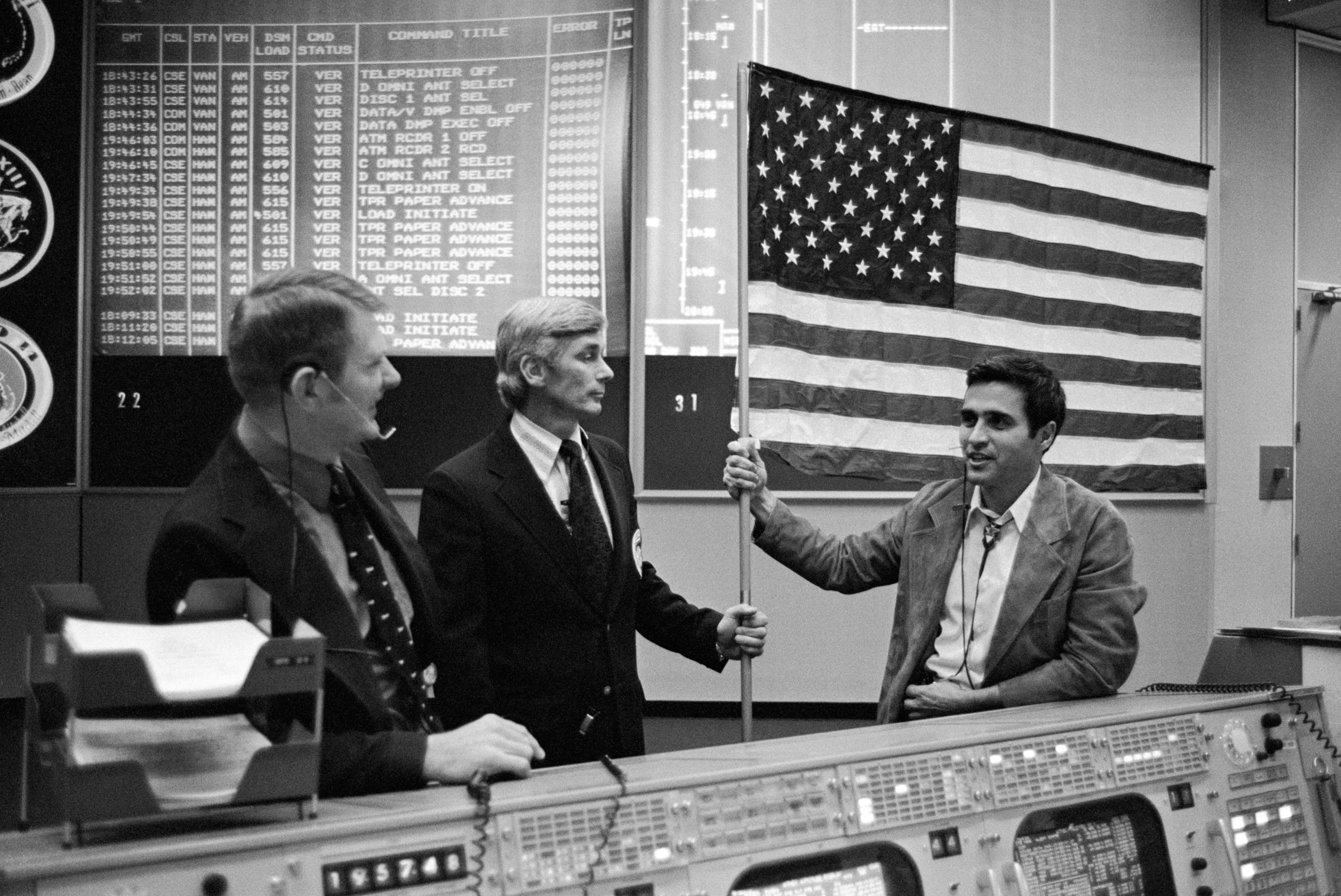
Cernan and Schmitt presenting the flag flown on Apollo 17 to Kranz

The flag which had hung in the Mission Operations Control Room (MOCR) in the Mission Control Center through the prior Apollo landings was flown to the Moon on the final mission, Apollo 17. This flag measured 20% wider and taller than the others requiring a 6-foot (1.8 m) long horizontal pole. Gene Cernan and Harrison Schmitt carried a second, identical flag to the Moon and back, and presented it to flight controller Gene Kranz after the flight, to replace the one left on the Moon.

== Flags deployed ==
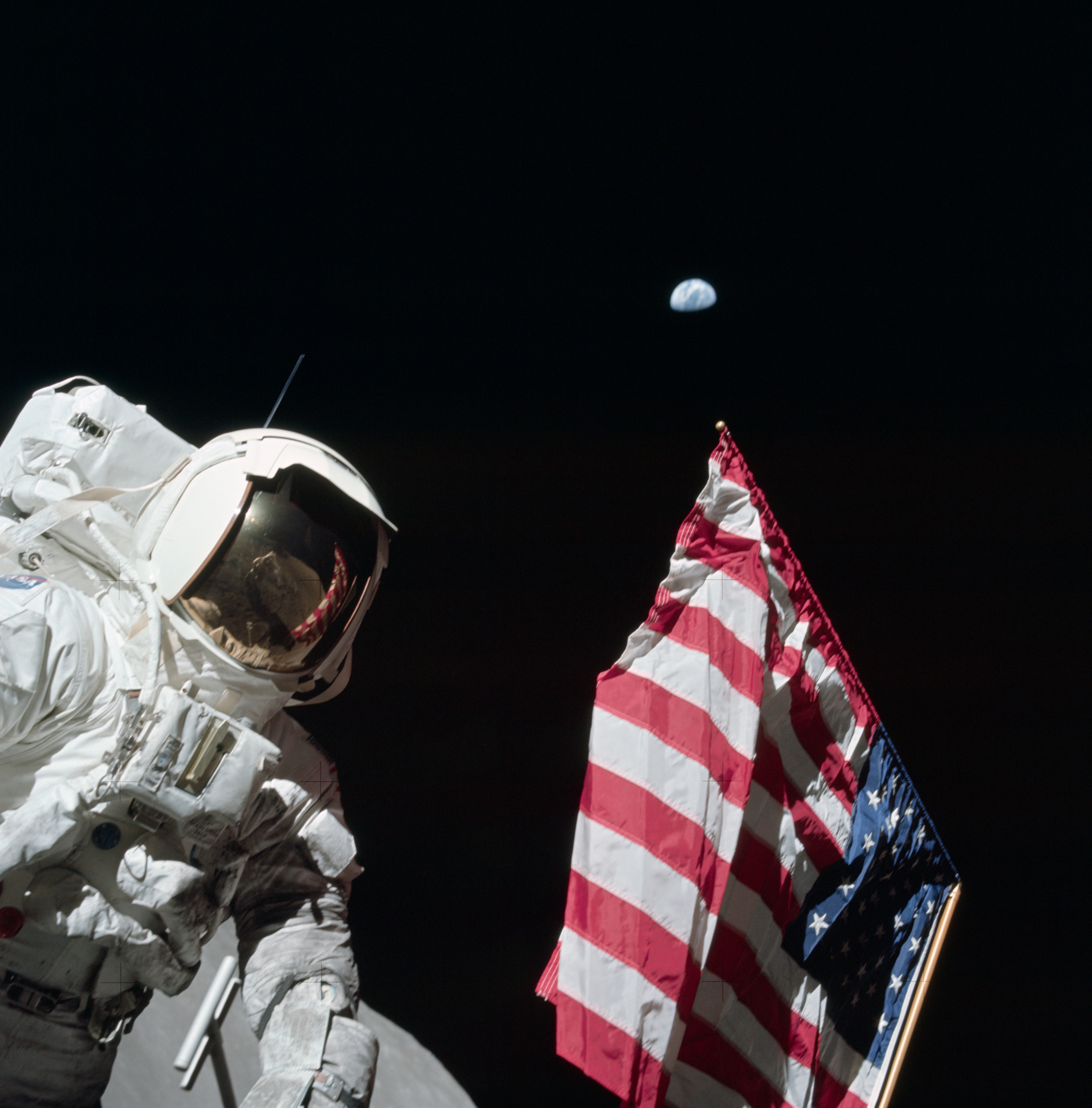
Harrison Schmitt poses by the American flag deployed on Apollo 17, December 11, 1972.

Flags were planted on each Apollo mission that landed on the Moon. Deploying the flag during the Apollo 11 mission proved to be a challenge. Armstrong and Aldrin had trouble inserting the pole into the lunar surface, and only managed to get it about seven inches deep. When they backed away from the flag, it proved it could stand on its own. Scientists discovered later that the lunar dust has a different profile than terrestrial dust. Dust from Earth has rounded edges; dust from the Moon has sharp edges. The sharp edges of the lunar dust make them catch against each other, making it difficult to insert items into them. Buzz Aldrin reported that the Apollo 11 flag, placed about 27 feet (8.2 m) from the centerline of the Eagle landing craft, was blown over by the blast of the rocket exhaust during takeoff. As a result, care was taken by subsequent crews to place the flags at greater distances from the Lunar Module.

Pete Conrad and Alan Bean, the crew of Apollo 12, had trouble with the latch mechanism which was supposed to keep the supporting pole horizontal, so the flag they deployed drooped at an angle. In response to this, the assembly was improved to include a double-latch locking mechanism for later missions.

The landing of Apollo 13 was aborted due to a major spacecraft malfunction encountered before reaching the Moon. The flag was stored externally in the MESA, and was destroyed with the Lunar Module Aquarius when it reentered the Earth's atmosphere.

Because of issues the Apollo 15 crew had deploying experiments, the flag planting happened later in the mission than intended; at the end of the second EVA rather than the first. The LFA was stored in the MESA on the side of the descent stage of the LM. Astronauts David Scott and James Irwin had practiced on Earth how to arrange themselves, the flag, and the Lunar Roving Vehicle around the LM for the best photography.

The flag deployed during Apollo 17 has a unique history. It traveled to the Moon and back on Apollo 11, and hung on the wall of Mission Control afterwards. On the first day of the mission, Gene Cernan erected it in Taurus–Littrow lunar valley. As he deployed it, Cernan said, "This was one of the proudest moments of my life. I guarantee it."

== Current status ==
Since the nylon flag was purchased from a government catalog, it was not designed to handle the harsh conditions of space. Some experts theorize that the colors of some flags may have faded to white due to the solar wind and high-energy sunlight (X-ray, ultraviolet, gamma rays), or that the fabric might have disintegrated entirely. A review of photographs taken by the Lunar Reconnaissance Orbiter (LRO) indicates that flags placed during the Apollo 12, 16, and 17 missions were still standing as of 2012. Due to the resolution of the LRO cameras, shadows from the fabric of the flag can be seen but the pole cannot, showing that the flags did not disintegrate entirely.

A photo review of the Apollo 11 site shows that Aldrin's observation that the flag fell over was likely correct, as no flag was seen in the images. As of 2012, experts were unable to determine if the Apollo 14 and 15 flags were still standing.

== See also ==
- List of artificial objects on the Moon
