= Saint-Ciergues =

- Commune
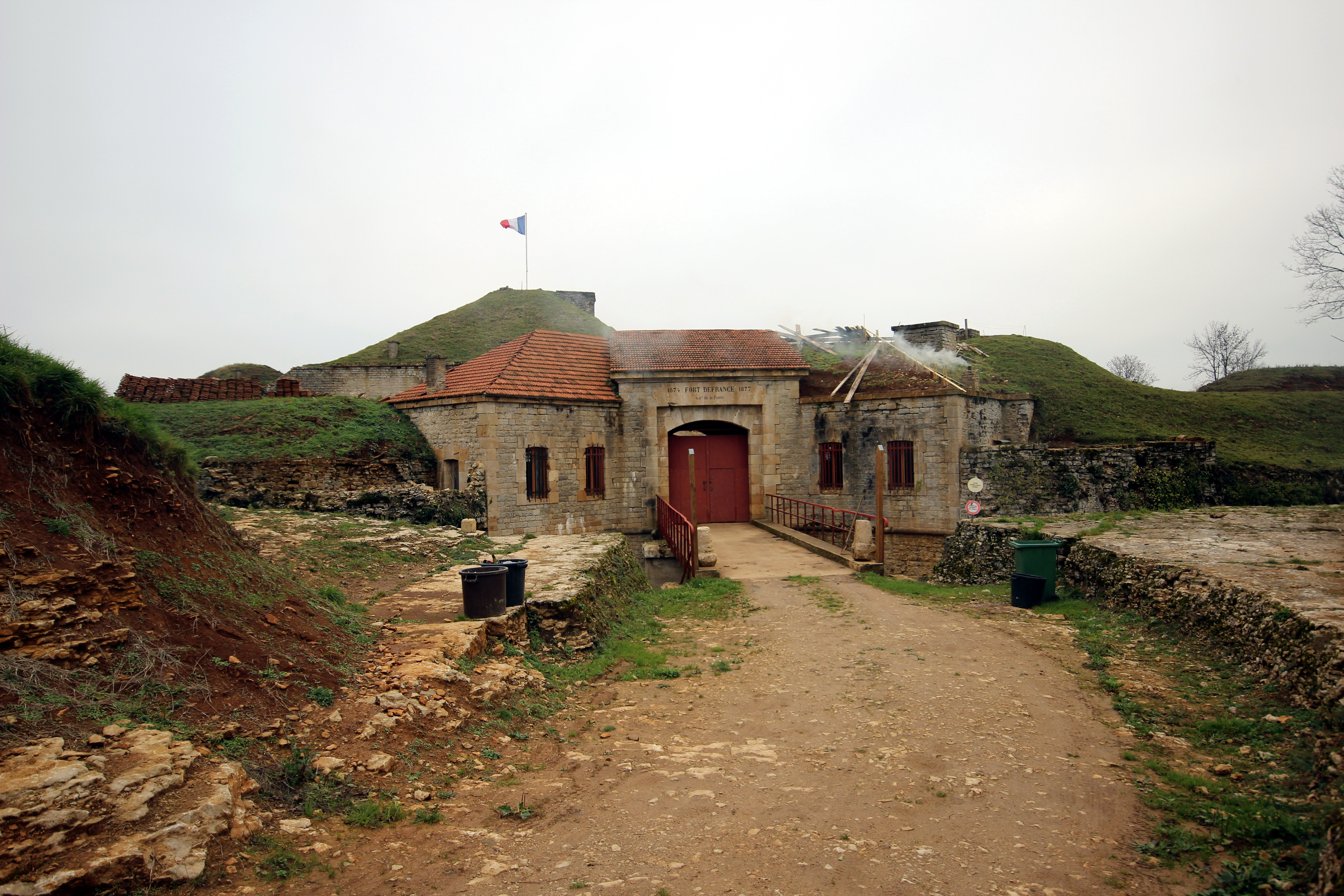
- The Pointe de Diamant fort in Saint-Ciergues
- Location of Saint-Ciergues
- Location within France Location within Grand Est
- Coordinates: 47°53′06″N 5°15′19″E
- Country: France
- Region: Grand Est
- Department: Haute-Marne
- Arrondissement: Langres
- Canton: Langres

Government
  - Mayor (2020–2026): Daniel Séguin
- Area^{1}: 12.45 km^{2} (4.81 sq mi)
- Elevation: 400 m (1,300 ft)
- Highest elevation: 457 m (1,499 ft)
- Lowest elevation: 329 m (1,079 ft)
- Population (2023): 173
  - Density: 13.9/km^{2} (36.0/sq mi)
- Time zone: UTC+01:00 (CET)
  - Summer (DST): UTC+02:00 (CEST)
- INSEE/Postal code: 52447 /52200
- ^{1} French Land Register data, which excludes lakes, ponds, glaciers > 1 km^{2} (0.386 sq mi or 247 acres) and river estuaries.

Saint-Ciergues (French pronunciation: [sɛ̃ sjɛʁg]) is a municipality in the French department of Haute-Marne (Grand Est region), and is part of the arrondissement of Langres. It has 180 inhabitants (2021).

== Geography ==
The area of Saint-Ciergues is 12.7 km², and the population density is 15 inhabitants per km². The lowest level is 329 meters and the highest level is 457 meters The map below shows the location of Saint-Ciergues with the main infrastructure and neighboring municipalities.

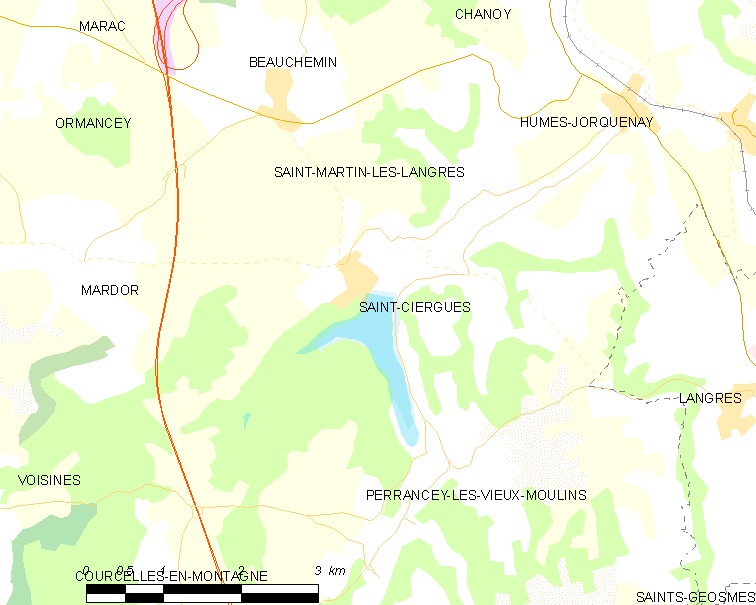
Map commune FR insee code 52447

== Demography ==
Historical population
Year	Pop.	±% p.a.
1968	167	—
1975	164	−0.26%
1982	196	+2.58%
1990	178	−1.20%
1999	158	−1.32%
2007	173	+1.14%
2012	179	+0.68%
2017	189	+1.09%
2023	173	−1.46%
Source: INSEE

== See also ==
- Communes of the Haute-Marne department
