= Lecey =

- Commune
- Location of Lecey
- Location within France Location within Grand Est
- Coordinates: 47°51′48″N 5°26′28″E
- Country: France
- Region: Grand Est
- Department: Haute-Marne
- Arrondissement: Langres
- Canton: Langres
- Intercommunality: Grand Langres

Government
  - Mayor (2020–2026): Bruno Carbillet
- Area^{1}: 7.85 km^{2} (3.03 sq mi)
- Elevation: 350 m (1,150 ft)
- Highest elevation: 427 m (1,401 ft)
- Lowest elevation: 346 m (1,135 ft)
- Population (2023): 196
  - Density: 25.0/km^{2} (64.7/sq mi)
- Time zone: UTC+01:00 (CET)
  - Summer (DST): UTC+02:00 (CEST)
- INSEE/Postal code: 52280 /52360
- ^{1} French Land Register data, which excludes lakes, ponds, glaciers > 1 km^{2} (0.386 sq mi or 247 acres) and river estuaries.

Lecey (French pronunciation: [ləsɛ]) is a commune in the Haute-Marne department in north-eastern France.

== See also ==
- Communes of the Haute-Marne department
