= Beauchemin =

- Commune
- Location of Beauchemin
- Location within France Location within Grand Est
- Coordinates: 47°54′21″N 5°14′32″E
- Country: France
- Region: Grand Est
- Department: Haute-Marne
- Arrondissement: Langres
- Canton: Langres

Government
  - Mayor (2020–2026): Jean Vincent
- Area^{1}: 11.92 km^{2} (4.60 sq mi)
- Elevation: 317 m (1,040 ft)
- Highest elevation: 448 m (1,470 ft)
- Lowest elevation: 333 m (1,093 ft)
- Population (2023): 112
  - Density: 9.40/km^{2} (24.3/sq mi)
- Time zone: UTC+01:00 (CET)
  - Summer (DST): UTC+02:00 (CEST)
- INSEE/Postal code: 52042 /52260
- ^{1} French Land Register data, which excludes lakes, ponds, glaciers > 1 km^{2} (0.386 sq mi or 247 acres) and river estuaries.

Beauchemin (French pronunciation: [boʃ(ə)mɛ̃]) is a commune in the Haute-Marne department in northeastern France.

== Population ==
Historical population
Year	Pop.	±% p.a.
1968	103	—
1975	95	−1.15%
1982	118	+3.15%
1990	86	−3.88%
1999	109	+2.67%
2007	106	−0.35%
2012	101	−0.96%
2017	104	+0.59%
2023	112	+1.24%
Source: INSEE

== See also ==
- Communes of the Haute-Marne department
