= Humes (surname) =

Humes is a surname. Notable people with the surname include:

- Cedric Humes (born 1983), American football running back
- Edward Humes, American journalist
- Harold L. Humes (1926–1992), American writer
- Helen Humes (1913–1981), American jazz and blues singer
- James C. Humes, American writer
- Jimmy Humes (born 1942), English footballer
- Mary-Margaret Humes (born 1954), American actress
- Marvin Humes (born 1985), British boy band member
- Rochelle Humes (born 1989), English singer and television presenter
- Tony Humes (born 1966), English footballer
- William Y.C. Humes (1830–1883), Confederate general
