= Peigney =

- Commune
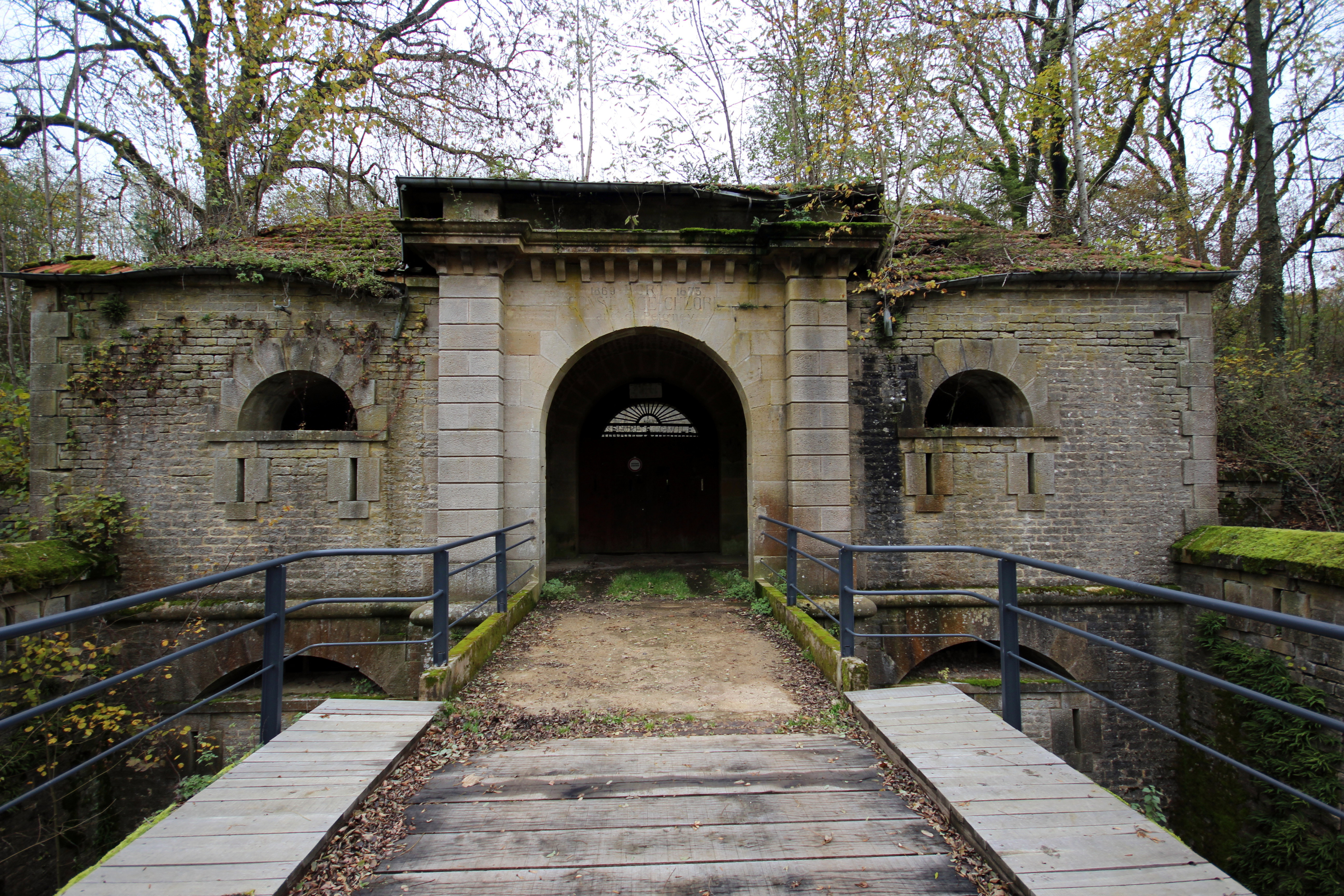
- The entrance to the fort in Peigney

- Coat of arms
- Location of Peigney
- Location within France Location within Grand Est
- Coordinates: 47°52′49″N 5°21′31″E
- Country: France
- Region: Grand Est
- Department: Haute-Marne
- Arrondissement: Langres
- Canton: Langres
- Intercommunality: Grand Langres

Government
  - Mayor (2020–2026): Serge Fontaine
- Area^{1}: 8.22 km^{2} (3.17 sq mi)
- Elevation: 378 m (1,240 ft)
- Highest elevation: 421 m (1,381 ft)
- Lowest elevation: 328 m (1,076 ft)
- Population (2023): 381
  - Density: 46.4/km^{2} (120/sq mi)
- Demonym(s): Villepaniens & Villepaniennes
- Time zone: UTC+01:00 (CET)
  - Summer (DST): UTC+02:00 (CEST)
- INSEE/Postal code: 52380 /52200
- ^{1} French Land Register data, which excludes lakes, ponds, glaciers > 1 km^{2} (0.386 sq mi or 247 acres) and river estuaries.

Peigney (French pronunciation: [pɛɲɛ]) is a commune in the Haute-Marne department in north-eastern France.

== See also ==
- Communes of the Haute-Marne department
