= Marac =

- Commune
- Location of Marac
- Location within France Location within Grand Est
- Coordinates: 47°55′40″N 5°11′47″E
- Country: France
- Region: Grand Est
- Department: Haute-Marne
- Arrondissement: Langres
- Canton: Langres

Government
  - Mayor (2020–2026): Thierry Rousselle
- Area^{1}: 21.92 km^{2} (8.46 sq mi)
- Elevation: 352 m (1,155 ft)
- Highest elevation: 444 m (1,457 ft)
- Lowest elevation: 344 m (1,129 ft)
- Population (2023): 210
  - Density: 9.6/km^{2} (25/sq mi)
- Time zone: UTC+01:00 (CET)
  - Summer (DST): UTC+02:00 (CEST)
- INSEE/Postal code: 52307 /52260
- ^{1} French Land Register data, which excludes lakes, ponds, glaciers > 1 km^{2} (0.386 sq mi or 247 acres) and river estuaries.

Marac (French pronunciation: [maʁak]) is a commune in the Haute-Marne department in north-eastern France.

== See also ==
- Communes of the Haute-Marne department
