= Faverolles, Haute-Marne =

Faverolles
- Commune
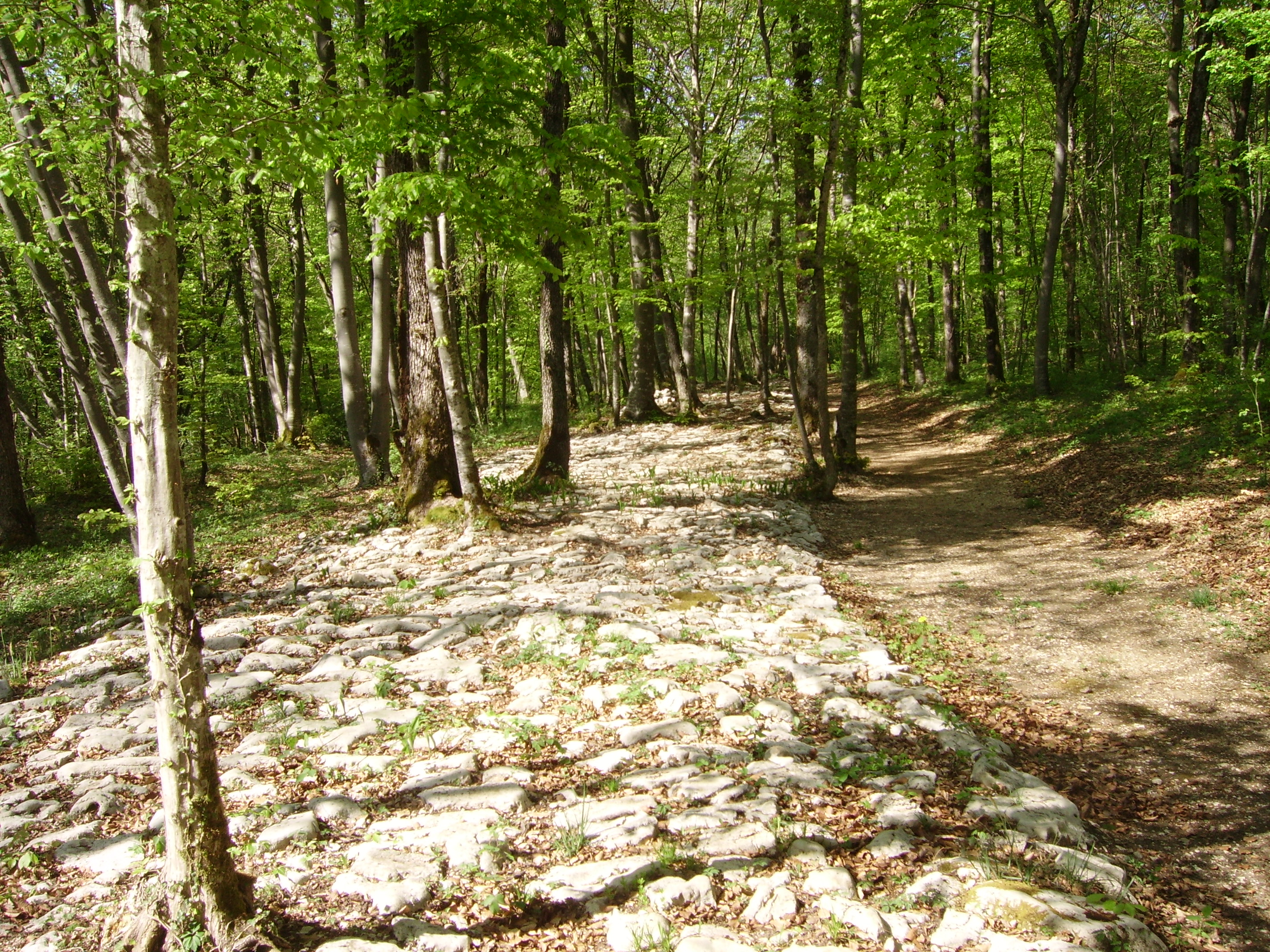
- Roman road in Faverolles
- Location of Faverolles
- Location within France Location within Grand Est
- Coordinates: 47°56′55″N 5°12′40″E
- Country: France
- Region: Grand Est
- Department: Haute-Marne
- Arrondissement: Langres
- Canton: Langres

Government
  - Mayor (2020–2026): Raphaël Péchiodat
- Area^{1}: 17.28 km^{2} (6.67 sq mi)
- Elevation: 367 m (1,204 ft)
- Highest elevation: 462 m (1,516 ft)
- Lowest elevation: 335 m (1,099 ft)
- Population (2023): 102
  - Density: 5.90/km^{2} (15.3/sq mi)
- Time zone: UTC+01:00 (CET)
  - Summer (DST): UTC+02:00 (CEST)
- INSEE/Postal code: 52196 /52260
- ^{1} French Land Register data, which excludes lakes, ponds, glaciers > 1 km^{2} (0.386 sq mi or 247 acres) and river estuaries.

Faverolles (French pronunciation: [favʁɔl]) is a commune in the Haute-Marne department in north-eastern France.

== See also ==
- Communes of the Haute-Marne department
