= Mardor =

- Commune
- Location of Mardor
- Location within France Location within Grand Est
- Coordinates: 47°53′17″N 5°12′18″E
- Country: France
- Region: Grand Est
- Department: Haute-Marne
- Arrondissement: Langres
- Canton: Langres

Government
  - Mayor (2020–2026): Jean-Pierre Ramaget
- Area^{1}: 7.44 km^{2} (2.87 sq mi)
- Elevation: 452 m (1,483 ft)
- Highest elevation: 460 m (1,510 ft)
- Lowest elevation: 374 m (1,227 ft)
- Population (2023): 55
  - Density: 7.4/km^{2} (19/sq mi)
- Time zone: UTC+01:00 (CET)
  - Summer (DST): UTC+02:00 (CEST)
- INSEE/Postal code: 52312 /52200
- ^{1} French Land Register data, which excludes lakes, ponds, glaciers > 1 km^{2} (0.386 sq mi or 247 acres) and river estuaries.

Mardor (French pronunciation: [maʁdɔʁ]) is a commune in the Haute-Marne department in northeastern France.

== See also ==
- Communes of the Haute-Marne department
