= Saints-Geosmes =

- Commune
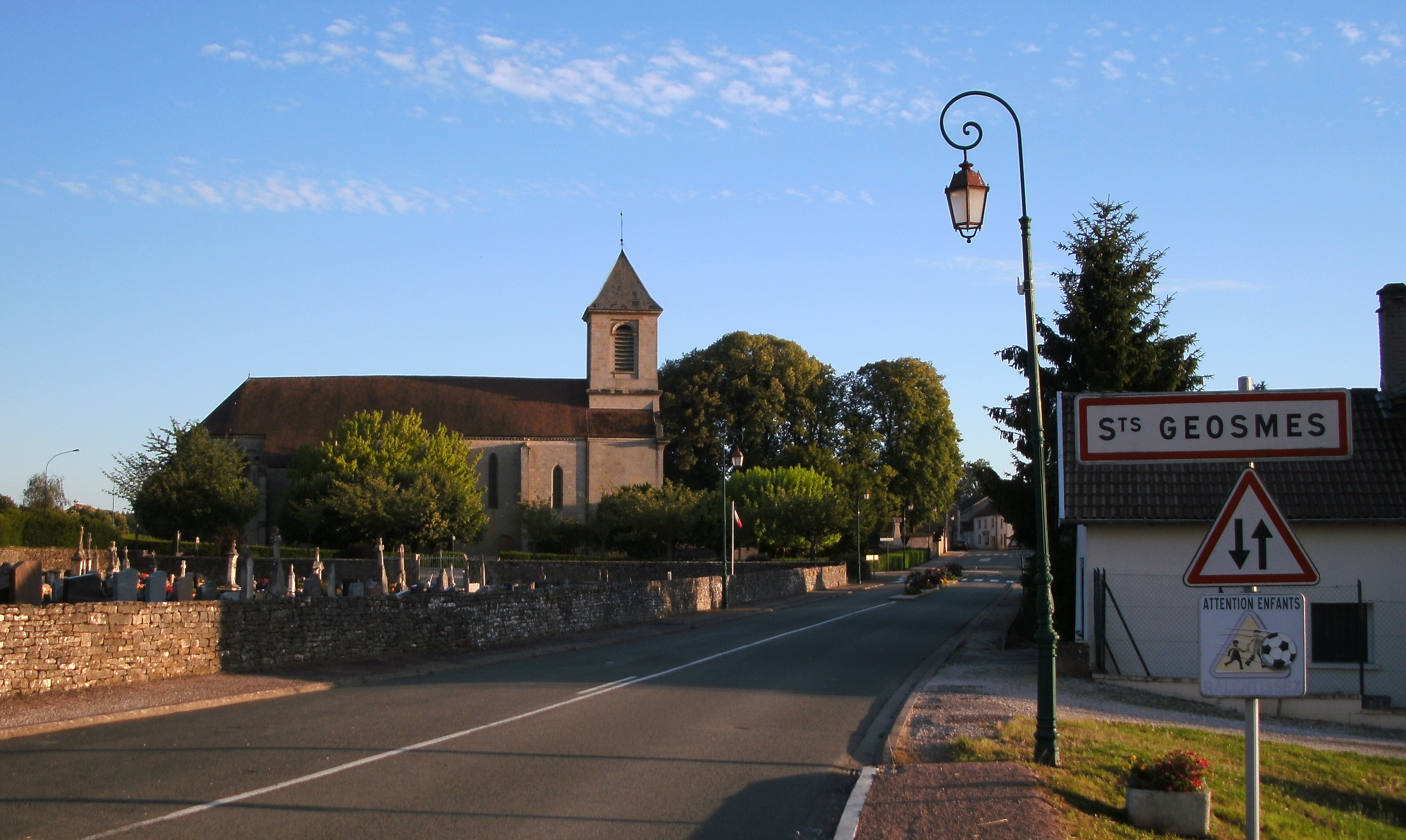
- The church in Saints-Geosmes

- Coat of arms
- Location of Saints-Geosmes
- Location within France Location within Grand Est
- Coordinates: 47°49′58″N 5°19′41″E
- Country: France
- Region: Grand Est
- Department: Haute-Marne
- Arrondissement: Langres
- Canton: Langres

Government
  - Mayor (2020–2026): Jacky Maugras
- Area^{1}: 27.61 km^{2} (10.66 sq mi)
- Elevation: 458 m (1,503 ft)
- Highest elevation: 476 m (1,562 ft)
- Lowest elevation: 373 m (1,224 ft)
- Population (2023): 1,111
  - Density: 40.24/km^{2} (104.2/sq mi)
- Time zone: UTC+01:00 (CET)
  - Summer (DST): UTC+02:00 (CEST)
- INSEE/Postal code: 52449 /52200
- ^{1} French Land Register data, which excludes lakes, ponds, glaciers > 1 km^{2} (0.386 sq mi or 247 acres) and river estuaries.

Saints-Geosmes (French pronunciation: [sɛ̃ ʒom]) is a commune in the Haute-Marne department in north-eastern France. On 1 January 2016, the former commune Balesmes-sur-Marne was merged into Saints-Geosmes.

== See also ==
- Communes of the Haute-Marne department
