= Jack Kinzler =

American engineer (1920–2014)

Jack Albert Kinzler
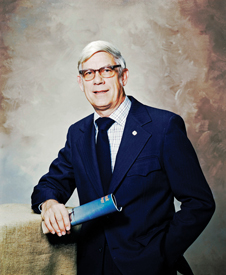
- Born: January 9, 1920; Pittsburgh, Pennsylvania, U.S.
- Died: March 4, 2014 (aged 94); Taylor Lake Village, Texas, U.S.
- Other name: Mr. Fix It
- Occupation: Engineer

Jack Kinzler (January 9, 1920 – March 4, 2014) was a NASA engineer, the former chief of the Technical Services Center at NASA's Lyndon B. Johnson Space Center, known within the agency as Mr. Fix It. He was awarded the NASA Distinguished Service Medal for creating the solar shield that saved Skylab after the original micrometeoroid shield was lost during launch of the station. His other contributions included the flagstaff and plaques used on the Moon for all six of the Apollo program Moon landings and the special six iron golf club head with which Apollo 14 astronaut Alan Shepard made his two famous golf drives on the Moon.

== Early life and NASA career ==
Kinzler was born in Pittsburgh, the son of a photoengraver and inventor who patented several photoengraving devices.

As a young man, Kinzler built model planes and flew them in competitions, turning down a scholarship at Pittsburgh's Duquesne University to pursue his interest in aeronautics. He parlayed his model-building skills into a job with National Advisory Committee for Aeronautics building models for wind tunnel testing. When the committee became the core of the newly created National Aeronautics and Space Administration in 1958, Kinzler stayed on.

He established the Technical Services Division at the Johnson Space Center in Houston, which included approximately 180 technicians skilled in the various tasks required by the space program, including machining and sheet metal work, welding, electronics, modeling, plastics, and electroplating, along with a field test branch. Kinzler led the Division from 1961 until his retirement in 1977.

== Apollo program contributions ==
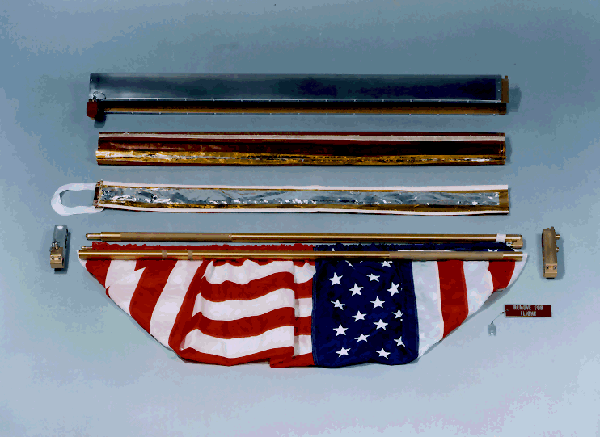
Unassembled LFA

Asked by NASA officials for ideas about how to make a commemorative U.S. flag "fly" on the airless Moon for the planned Apollo landings, it was Kinzler who invented and oversaw the design and implementation of the system ultimately used.

As the Moon had no atmosphere that would allow a flag to fly on a traditional flagstaff, NASA had originally planned only to imprint a flag on the lower section of the Apollo Lunar Module, which would be left behind on the Moon as the astronauts returned to the Apollo Command/Service Module to journey back to Earth. Kinzler suggested the Lunar Flag Assembly (LFA), a telescoping pole with a horizontal crossbar that would fit inside a hemmed pocket at the top of the flag, making it visible, as if extended in a strong wind. (He credited the idea to having seen his mother hang curtains in a similar fashion during his childhood.)

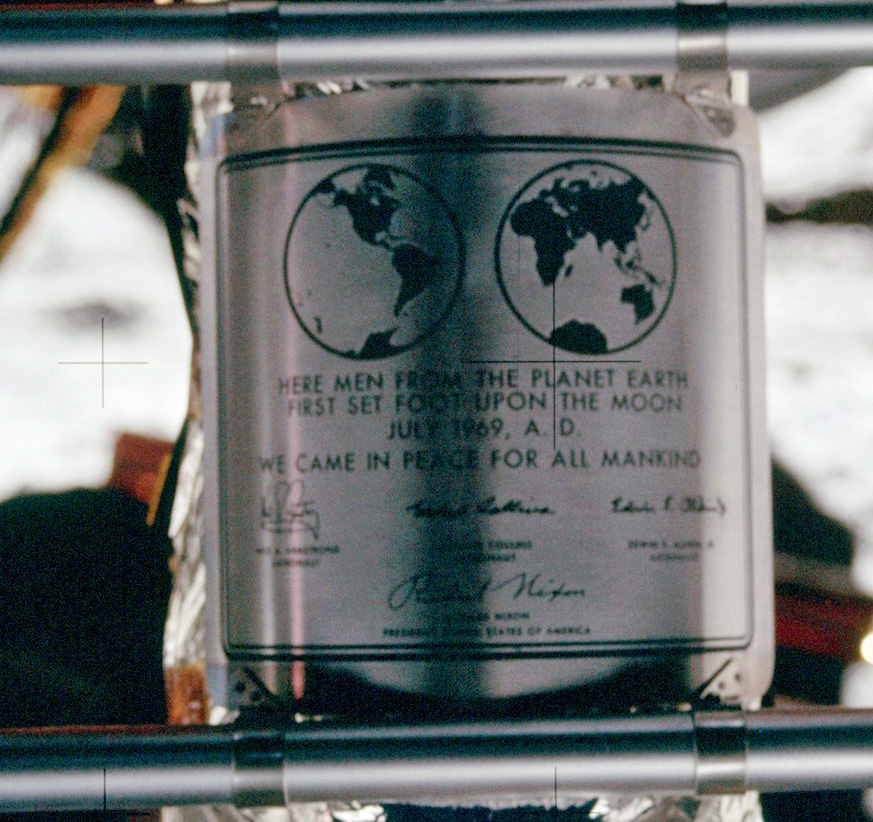
Commemorative plaque left on the Moon by the 1969 Apollo 11 mission

Kinzler also designed the commemorative plaque installed on the Lunar Module for each of the Apollo landing missions. The stainless steel plaque included facsimiles of the signatures of all mission astronauts and of the president of the United States along with a depiction of the Eastern and Western Hemisphere of the Earth. The Apollo 11 plaque included the inscription, "Here men from the Planet Earth first set foot upon the Moon. July 1969 AD. We came in peace for all mankind."

Kinzler also helped to fabricate the specially modified six-iron golf club head that Apollo 14 astronaut Alan Shepard attached to the handle of a lunar sampling scoop and used to drive two golf balls on the Moon.

Kinzler's technical services division was responsible for a variety of other space program tools and innovations, including the Hand-Held Maneuvering Unit used by Ed White during the Gemini IV mission in the first spacewalk by a U.S. astronaut and the flexible rubber boot between a space capsule and its re-entry heat shield that softened ocean landings.

== Skylab ==
On May 14, 1973, NASA launched Skylab, the United States' first space station. During the launch, a meteorite shield prematurely deployed, which ripped off the shield and one of the station's solar panels, and the debris prevented another solar panel from fully deploying. Without protection from the solar heat and low on electricity due to the lost and damaged solar panels, the temperature inside the station rose dangerously, threatening to ruin on-board film and food and eventually make the station uninhabitable as overheated plastic components would exude toxic gases.

Kinzler sought a solution that did not require a dangerous spacewalk by the Skylab crew. His solution was to develop a parasol-like arrangement that could be deployed through an 8-inch (20 cm) square sally port through the hull of the station at the point of the damage. He built a prototype using four telescoping fiberglass fishing rods and parachute silk. Kinzler's design allowed the device to be pushed through the port from the inside of the station and then deployed by activating springs and telescoping tubes. His model convinced the NASA higher-ups, which ordered the plan put into action. On May 26 the Skylab crew entered the station and deployed the aluminized 24-by-28-foot (7.3 m × 8.5 m) Inconel parasol, which successfully shielded the station from solar heating, enabling it to maintain a temperature of 70 °F (21.1 °C).

Kinzler's greatest source of pride was that the parasol was conceived and executed almost entirely by government employees. "We stayed awake and worked for six solid days, around the clock," he said. "We had a hundred employees working on this thing, and we did everything. We made all the parts. We demonstrated how it's to be done. And we completely pulled that thing off without any outside help."

For his contribution that saved Skylab, Kinzler was awarded the NASA Distinguished Service Medal in 1973.
