= Saint-Martin-lès-Langres =

- Commune
- Location of Saint-Martin-lès-Langres
- Location within France Location within Grand Est
- Coordinates: 47°53′23″N 5°15′52″E
- Country: France
- Region: Grand Est
- Department: Haute-Marne
- Arrondissement: Langres
- Canton: Langres

Government
  - Mayor (2020–2026): Mickaël Goirot
- Area^{1}: 3.64 km^{2} (1.41 sq mi)
- Elevation: 400 m (1,300 ft)
- Highest elevation: 424 m (1,391 ft)
- Lowest elevation: 328 m (1,076 ft)
- Population (2023): 105
  - Density: 28.8/km^{2} (74.7/sq mi)
- Time zone: UTC+01:00 (CET)
  - Summer (DST): UTC+02:00 (CEST)
- INSEE/Postal code: 52452 /52200
- ^{1} French Land Register data, which excludes lakes, ponds, glaciers > 1 km^{2} (0.386 sq mi or 247 acres) and river estuaries.

Saint-Martin-lès-Langres (French pronunciation: [sɛ̃ maʁtɛ̃ lɛ lɑ̃ɡʁ], literally Saint-Martin near Langres, before 1962: Saint-Martin) is a commune in the Haute-Marne department in north-eastern France. The musicologist Jean Étienne Feytou (1742–1816) was born in Saint-Martin-lès-Langres.

== See also ==
- Communes of the Haute-Marne department
