= Saint-Maurice, Haute-Marne =

Saint-Maurice
- Commune
- Location of Saint-Maurice
- Location within France Location within Grand Est
- Coordinates: 47°50′47″N 5°24′36″E
- Country: France
- Region: Grand Est
- Department: Haute-Marne
- Arrondissement: Langres
- Canton: Langres

Government
  - Mayor (2020–2026): Didier Dechanet
- Area^{1}: 3.55 km^{2} (1.37 sq mi)
- Elevation: 398 m (1,306 ft)
- Highest elevation: 407 m (1,335 ft)
- Lowest elevation: 346 m (1,135 ft)
- Population (2023): 125
  - Density: 35.2/km^{2} (91.2/sq mi)
- Time zone: UTC+01:00 (CET)
  - Summer (DST): UTC+02:00 (CEST)
- INSEE/Postal code: 52453 /52200
- ^{1} French Land Register data, which excludes lakes, ponds, glaciers > 1 km^{2} (0.386 sq mi or 247 acres) and river estuaries.

Saint-Maurice (French pronunciation: [sɛ̃ mɔʁis]) is a commune in the Haute-Marne department in north-eastern France.

== See also ==
- Communes of the Haute-Marne department
