= Chatenay-Mâcheron =

- Commune
- Location of Chatenay-Mâcheron
- Location within France Location within Grand Est
- Coordinates: 47°50′49″N 5°24′11″E
- Country: France
- Region: Grand Est
- Department: Haute-Marne
- Arrondissement: Langres
- Canton: Langres
- Intercommunality: Grand Langres

Government
  - Mayor (2020–2026): Alain Dangien
- Area^{1}: 6.1 km^{2} (2.4 sq mi)
- Highest elevation: 407 m (1,335 ft)
- Lowest elevation: 333 m (1,093 ft)
- Population (2023): 97
  - Density: 16/km^{2} (41/sq mi)
- Time zone: UTC+01:00 (CET)
  - Summer (DST): UTC+02:00 (CEST)
- INSEE/Postal code: 52115 /52200
- ^{1} French Land Register data, which excludes lakes, ponds, glaciers > 1 km^{2} (0.386 sq mi or 247 acres) and river estuaries.

Chatenay-Mâcheron (French pronunciation: [ʃatnɛ maʃʁɔ̃]) is a commune in the Haute-Marne department in north-eastern France.

== See also ==
- Communes of the Haute-Marne department
