= Champigny-lès-Langres =

- Commune
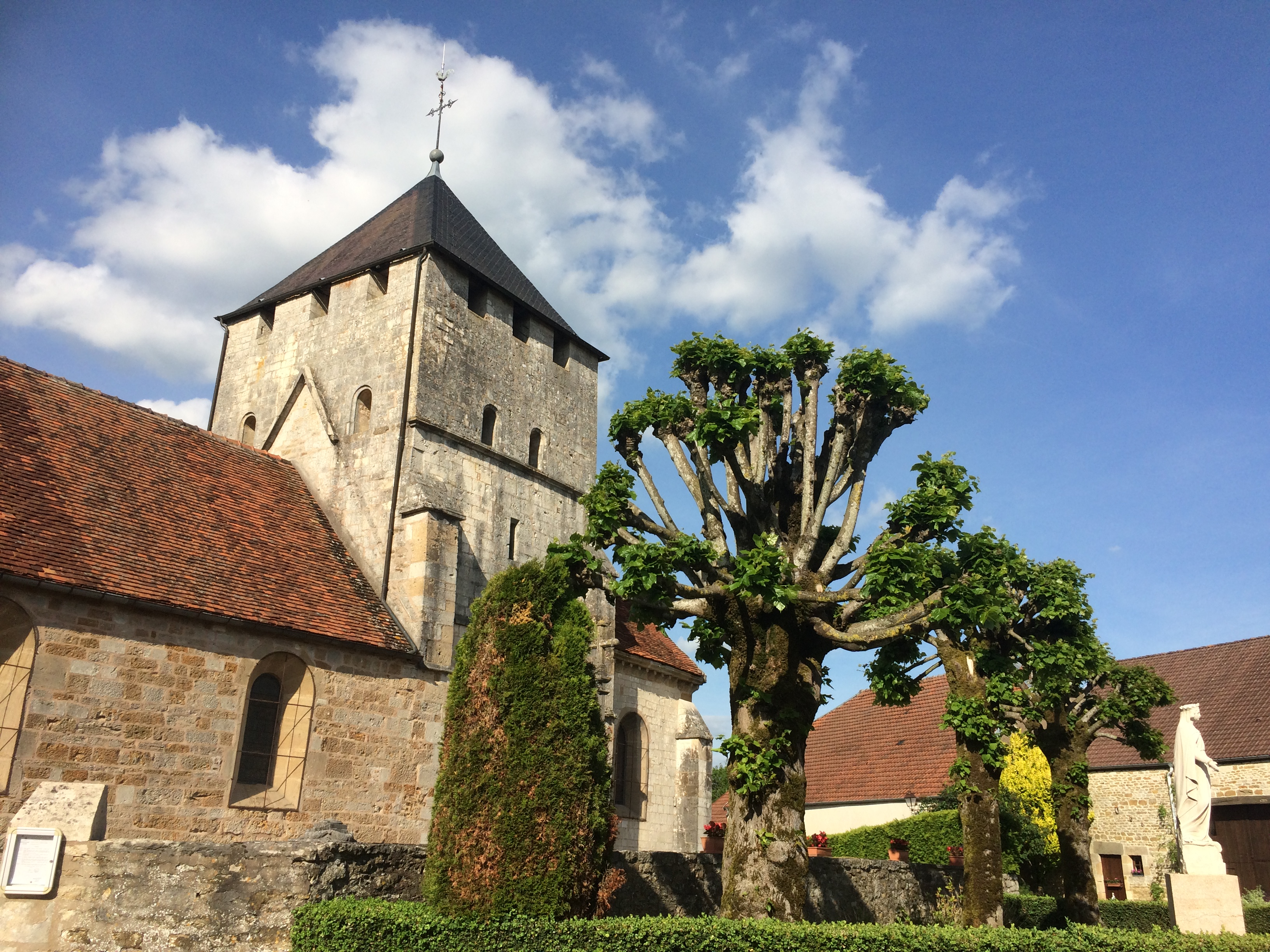
- The church in Champigny-lès-Langres
- Location of Champigny-lès-Langres
- Location within France Location within Grand Est
- Coordinates: 47°53′39″N 5°20′49″E
- Country: France
- Region: Grand Est
- Department: Haute-Marne
- Arrondissement: Langres
- Canton: Langres
- Intercommunality: CC Grand Langres

Government
  - Mayor (2020–2026): Hervé Fournier
- Area^{1}: 6.35 km^{2} (2.45 sq mi)
- Elevation: 372 m (1,220 ft)
- Highest elevation: 420 m (1,380 ft)
- Lowest elevation: 327 m (1,073 ft)
- Population (2023): 402
  - Density: 63.3/km^{2} (164/sq mi)
- Demonym(s): Campinois, Campinoises
- Time zone: UTC+01:00 (CET)
  - Summer (DST): UTC+02:00 (CEST)
- INSEE/Postal code: 52102 /52200
- ^{1} French Land Register data, which excludes lakes, ponds, glaciers > 1 km^{2} (0.386 sq mi or 247 acres) and river estuaries.

Champigny-lès-Langres (French pronunciation: [ʃɑ̃piɲi lɛ lɑ̃ɡʁ], literally Champigny near Langres) is a commune in the Haute-Marne department in north-eastern France.

== See also ==
- Communes of the Haute-Marne department
