= Lunar plaque =

Commemorative plaques attached to the United States Apollo Lunar Modules

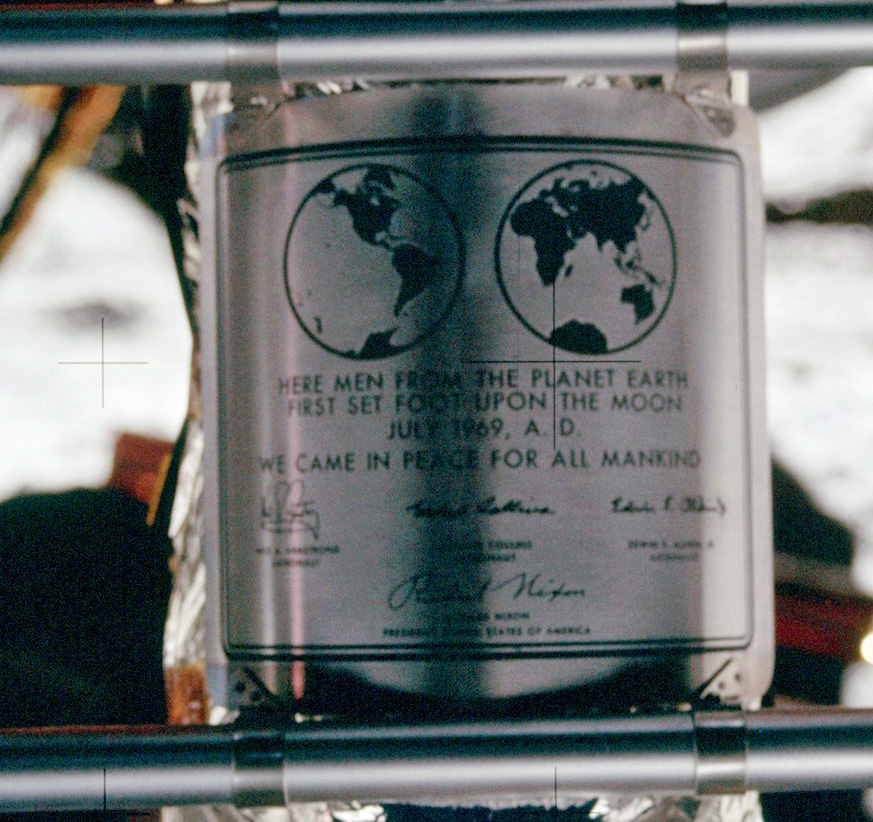
The Apollo 11 plaque on the descent stage of the Lunar Module Eagle on the Moon bears the signatures of Neil Armstrong, Michael Collins, Buzz Aldrin, and U.S. President Richard M. Nixon

Lunar plaques are stainless steel commemorative plaques measuring 9 by 7 5/8 inches (22.9 by 19.4 cm) attached to the ladders on the descent stages of the United States Apollo Lunar Modules flown on lunar landing missions Apollo 11 through Apollo 17, to be left permanently on the lunar surface. The plaques were originally suggested and designed by NASA's head of technical services Jack Kinzler, who oversaw their production.

All of the plaques bear facsimiles of the participating astronauts' signatures. For this reason, an extra plaque had to be made for Apollo 13 due to the late replacement of one crew member. The first (Apollo 11) and last (Apollo 17) plaques bear a facsimile of the signature of Richard Nixon, President of the United States during the landings, along with references to the start and completion of "man's first explorations of the Moon" and expressions of peace "for all mankind".

All, except the Apollo 12 plaque (which is also textured differently), bear pictures of the two hemispheres of Earth. Apollo 17's plaque bears a depiction of the lunar globe in addition to the Earth. The plaques used on missions 13 through 16 bear the call-sign of each mission's Lunar Module. All of the plaques were left on the Moon, except for those of the aborted Apollo 13 mission.

== Plaques ==
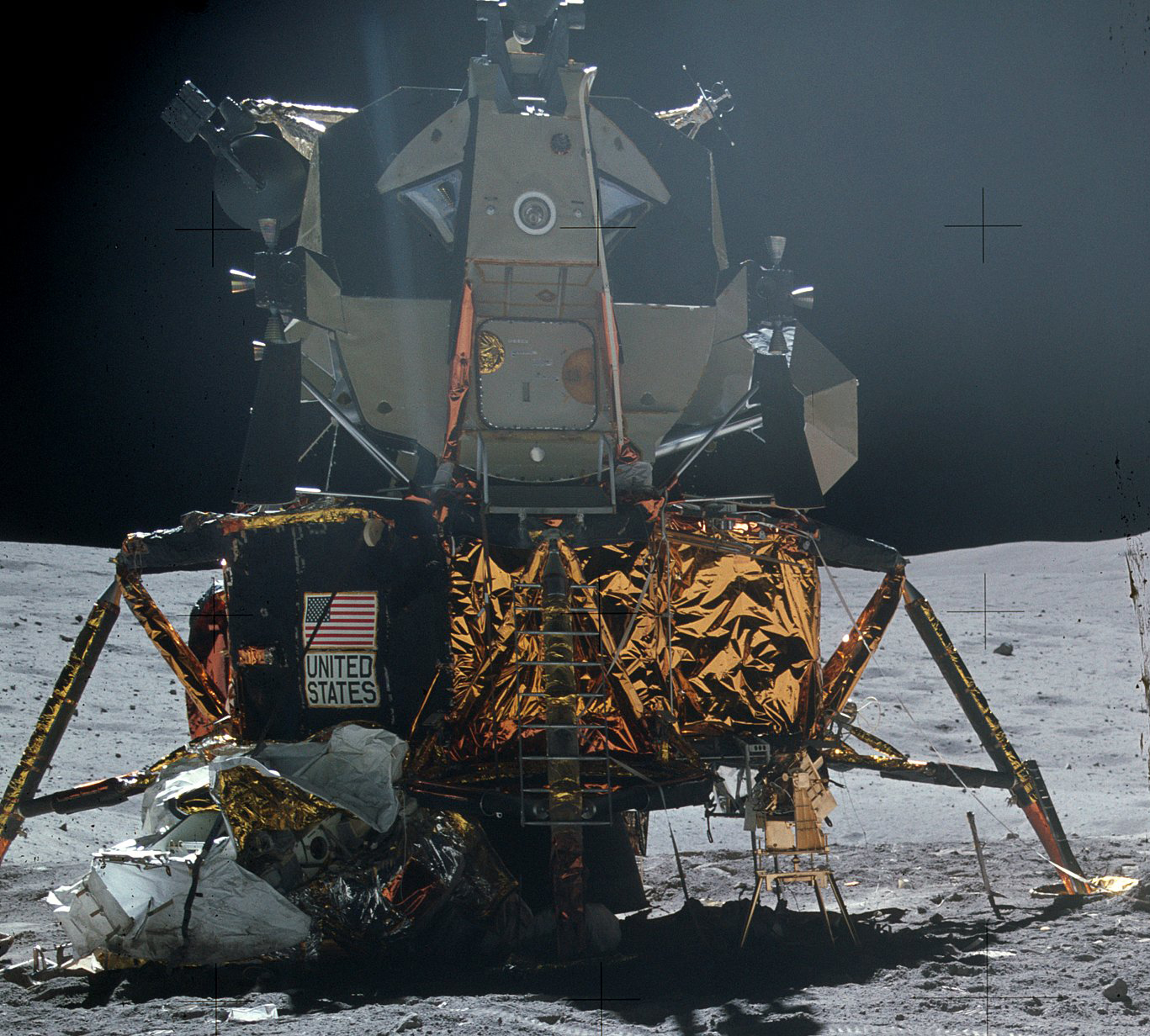
Apollo 16 Lunar Module

- Apollo 11 plaque inscription: "Here men from the planet Earth first set foot upon the Moon July 1969, A.D. We came in peace for all mankind" in capital letters. The statement "We came in peace for all mankind" is derived from the 1958 National Aeronautics and Space Act's declaration of policy and purpose:

"The Congress hereby declares that it is the policy of the United States that activities in space should be devoted to peaceful purposes for the benefit of all mankind."

(Signatures: Neil A. Armstrong; Michael Collins; Edwin E. Aldrin, Jr.; Richard Nixon, President, United States of America)

- Apollo 12 plaque inscription: Apollo 12 November 1969 (Signatures: Charles Conrad, Jr.; Richard F. Gordon, Jr.; Alan L. Bean)
- Apollo 13 plaque inscription: Apollo 13 Aquarius April 1970 (Signatures on original plaque, bolted to the LM ladder: James A. Lovell; Thomas K. Mattingly II; Fred W. Haise. A replacement plaque with John L. Swigert, Jr.'s name replacing Mattingly's was carried in the spacecraft cabin; Lovell was to have placed this over the original as he descended the ladder. After the landing was aborted, Lovell saved the replacement to keep as a souvenir; the first plaque bearing Mattingly's name was destroyed when Aquarius reentered the Earth's atmosphere at the end of the mission.)
- Apollo 14 plaque inscription: Apollo 14 Antares February 1971 (Signatures: Alan B. Shepard, Jr.; Stuart A. Roosa; Edgar D. Mitchell)
- Apollo 15 plaque inscription: Apollo 15 Falcon July 1971 (Signatures: David R. Scott; Alfred M. Worden; James B. Irwin)
- Apollo 16 plaque inscription: Apollo 16 Orion April 1972 (Signatures: John W. Young; Thomas K. Mattingly II; Charles M. Duke, Jr.)
- Apollo 17 plaque inscription: "Here man completed his first explorations of the Moon December 1972, A.D. May the spirit of peace in which we came be reflected in the lives of all mankind" in capital letters. (Signatures: Eugene A. Cernan; Ronald E. Evans; Harrison H. Schmitt; Richard Nixon, President, United States of America).

== Plaques gallery ==
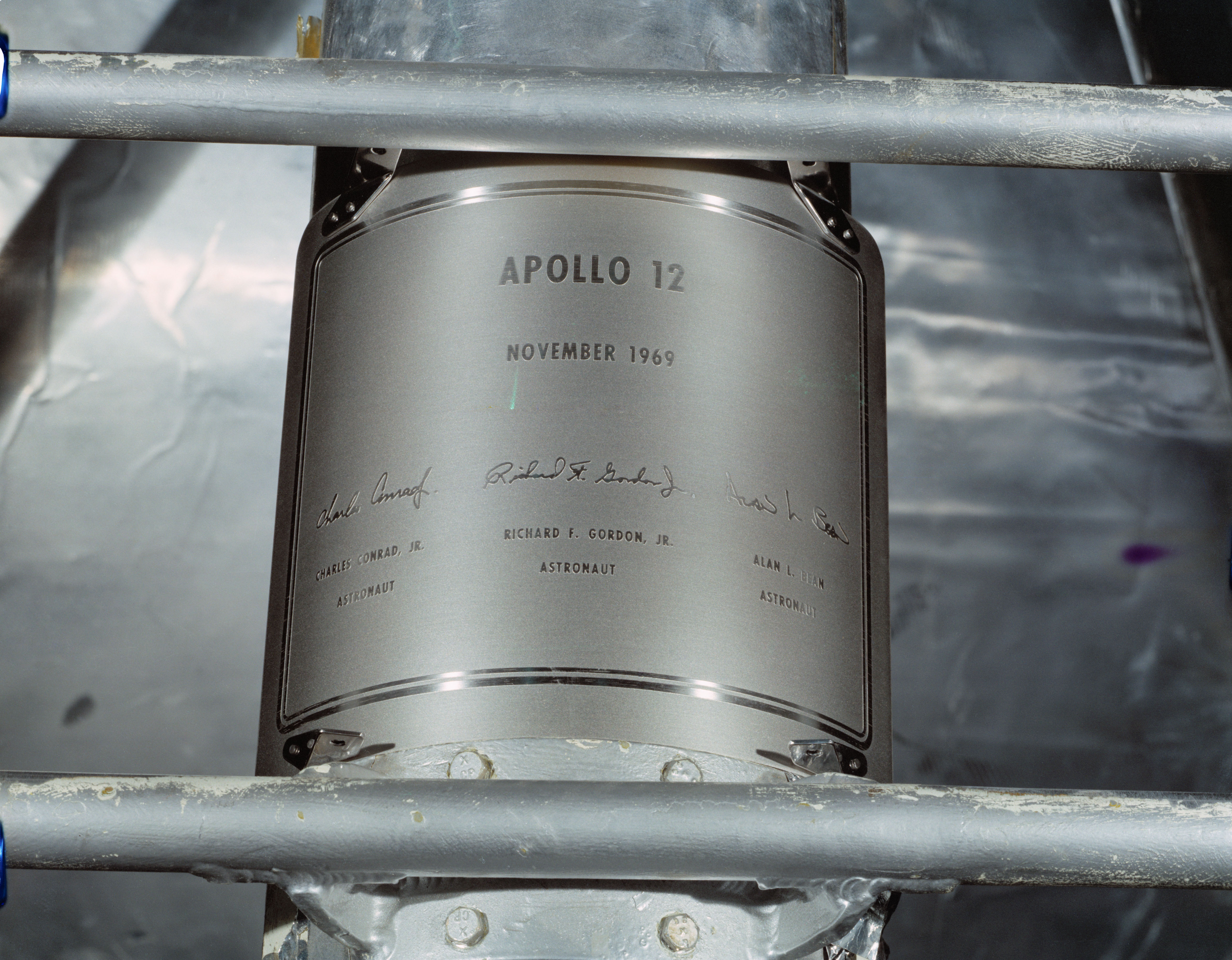
Replica of the Apollo 12 plaque

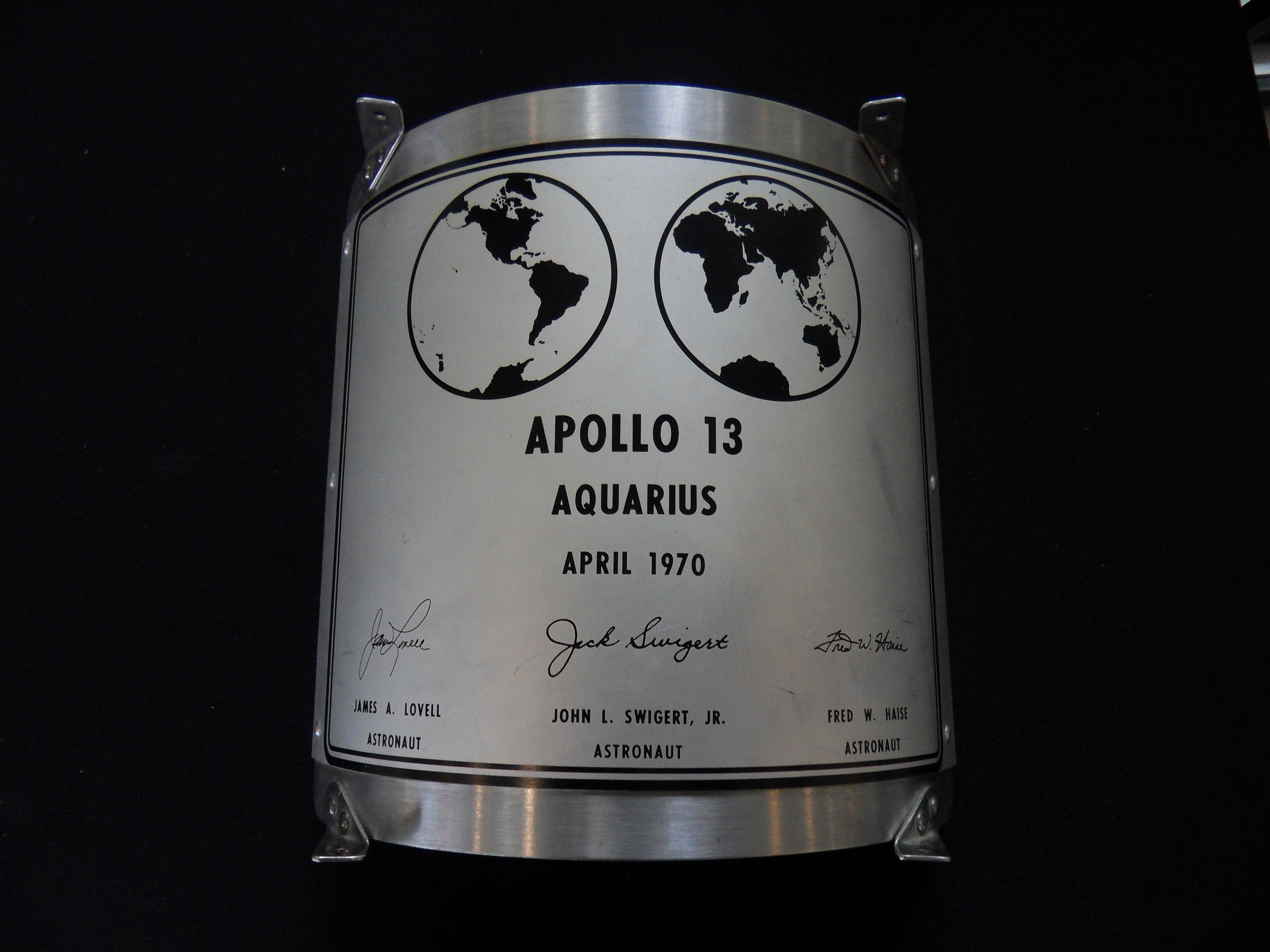
Replica of the replacement Apollo 13 plaque, with Swigert's signature instead of Mattingly's; James Lovell has the original

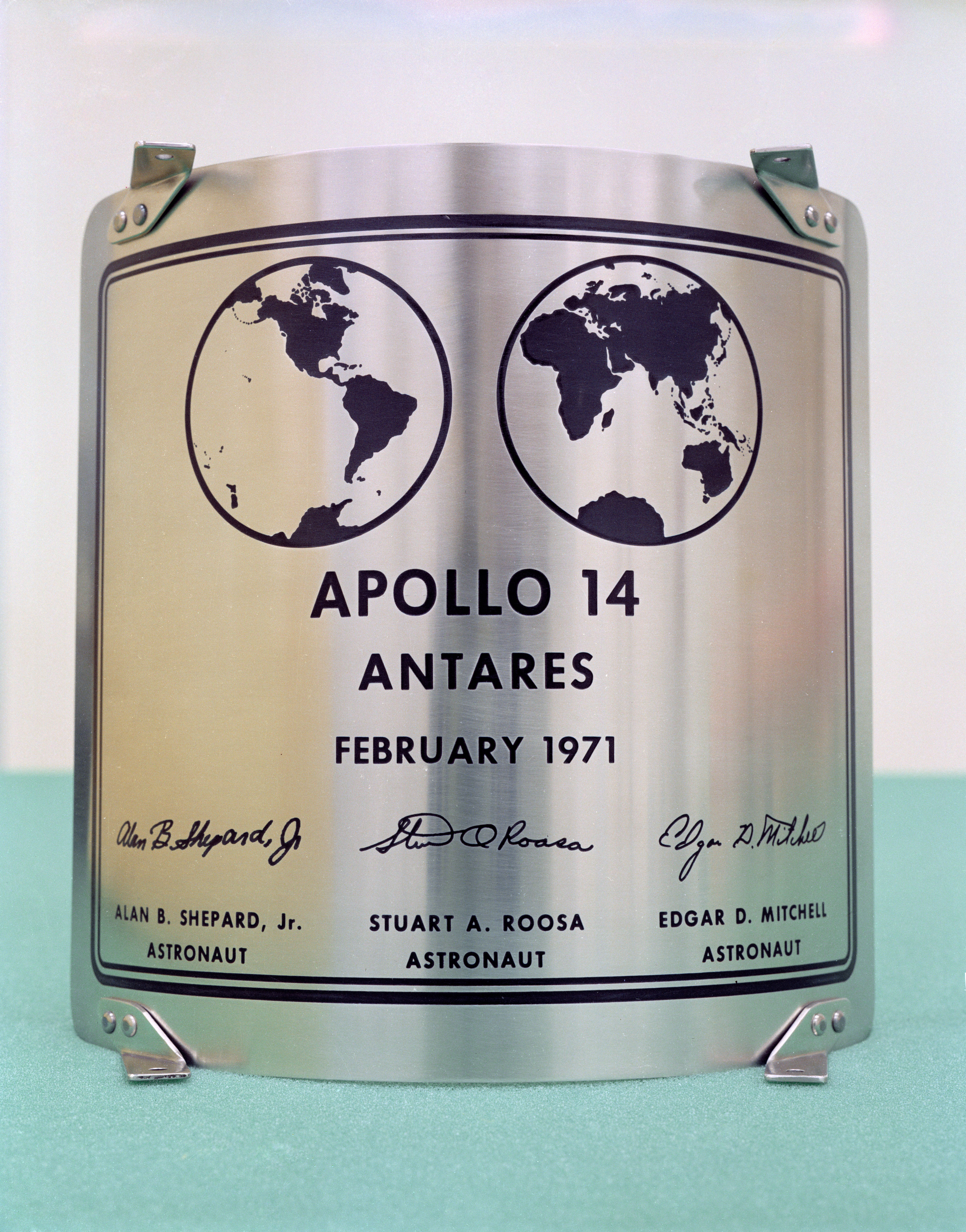
Apollo 14 plaque

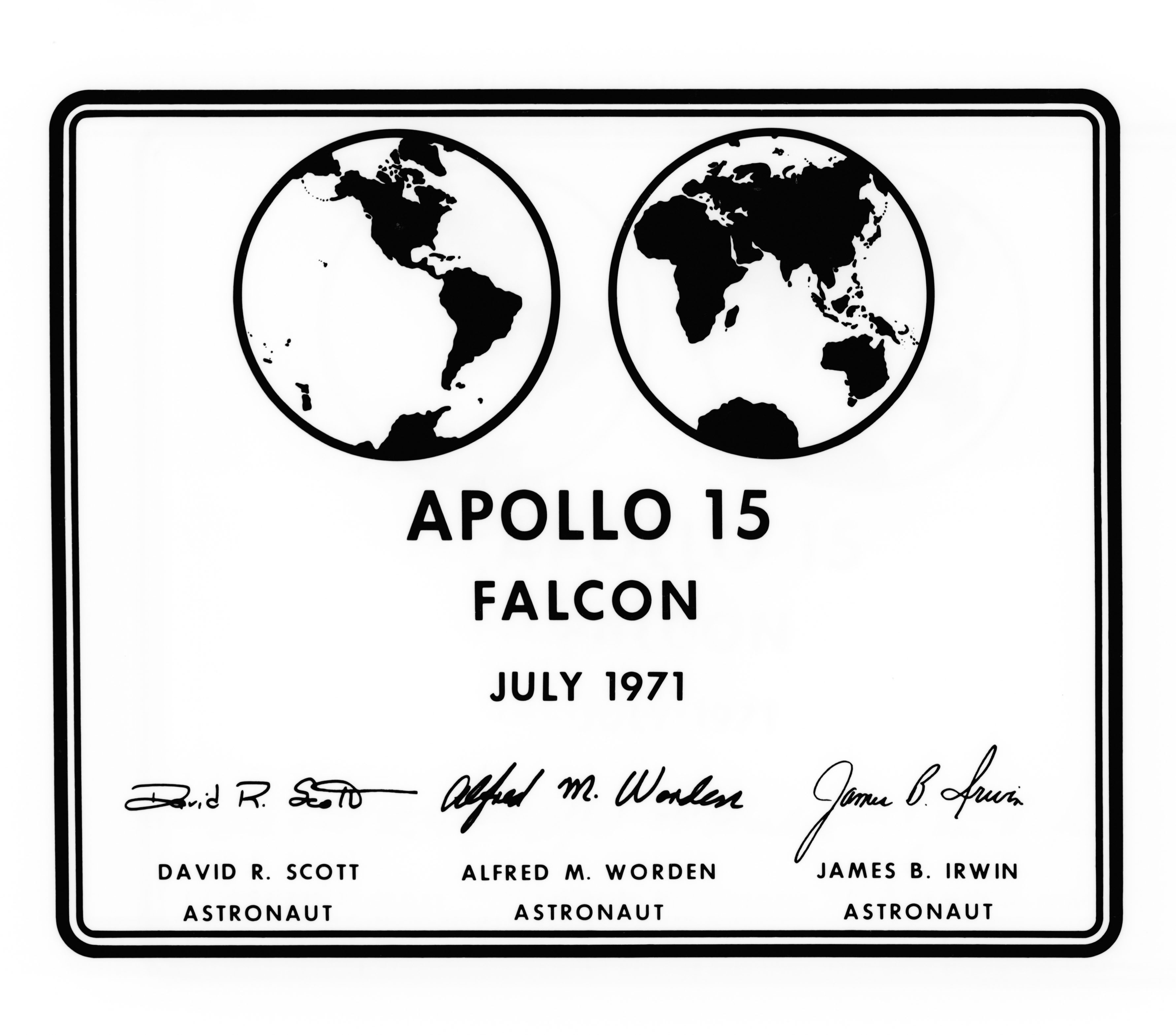
Imprint of the Apollo 15 plaque

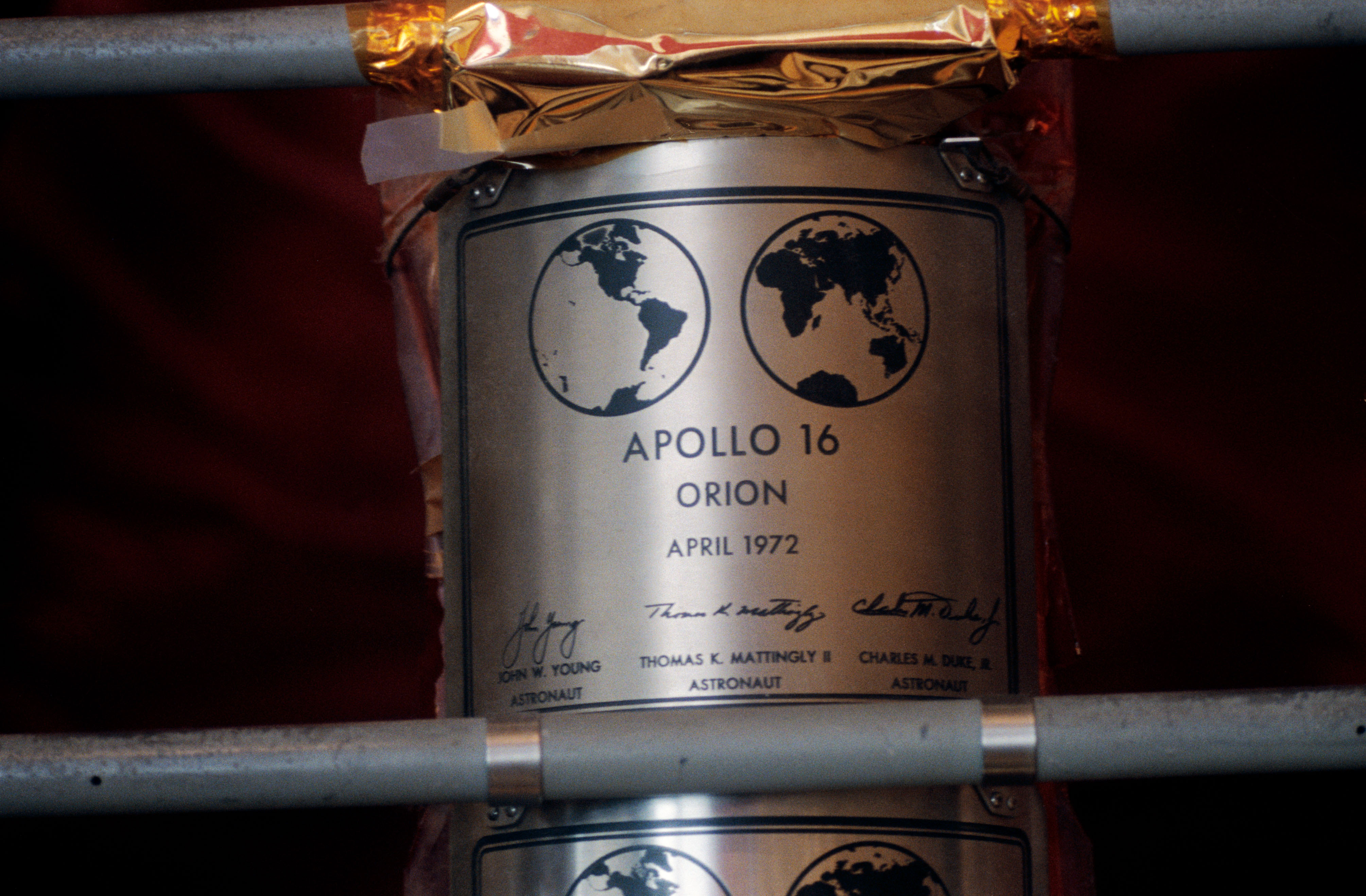
Apollo 16 plaque, mounted in place

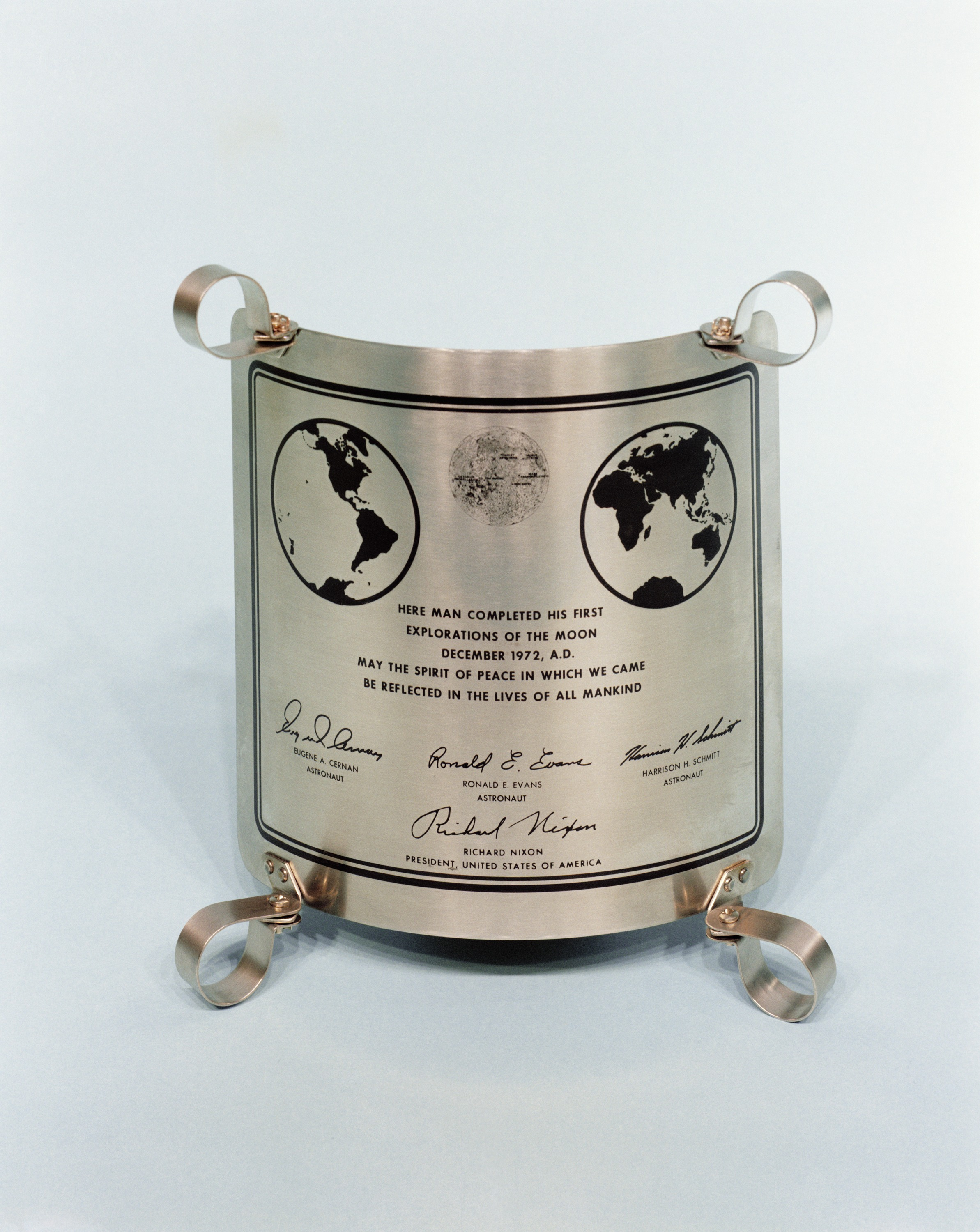
Apollo 17 plaque

== Notes ==
- The plaques are curved so as to fit around the landing leg and not hinder the astronauts from using the ladder. The plaques were attached directly to the ladder rungs, between the third and fourth rungs from the bottom.
- Two plaques were made for Apollo 13, because of the replacement two days before launch of Command Module Pilot Thomas K. "Ken" Mattingly with John L. "Jack" Swigert, because of Mattingly's exposure to German measles. Mission Commander James "Jim" Lovell was to have placed the plaque bearing Swigert's name over the original already fastened to the LM Aquarius, when he descended the ladder to walk on the Moon. When the landing was aborted, Lovell saved this plaque to keep as a memento, and it remains in his possession. The original plaque bearing Mattingly's name was destroyed when Aquarius reentered the Earth's atmosphere.
- The lunar near-side map, with the six Apollo lunar landing sites marked on it, was added to the Apollo 17 plaque at the suggestion of astronaut Gene Cernan.
- Reproductions of the plaques were given as mementos to foreign governments through various United States embassies after each flight.
- James C. Humes, a speech writer for President Nixon and four other presidents, is partly credited for authoring the text on the Apollo 11 lunar plaque. William Safire and Pat Buchanan also worked on drafting the plaque.
- In 1989, William Safire in his capacity as a "word maven" wryly wrote that AD should have been placed before the year, not after: "I had a hand in the first sign to be placed by earthlings on another celestial body, and it contains a glaring grammatical error."
- The plaques were produced by Nelson-Miller, Inc. in Los Angeles, CA.

== See also ==
- List of artificial objects on the Moon
- Pioneer plaque
