= Chatenay-Vaudin =

- Commune
- Location of Chatenay-Vaudin
- Location within France Location within Grand Est
- Coordinates: 47°51′13″N 5°26′48″E
- Country: France
- Region: Grand Est
- Department: Haute-Marne
- Arrondissement: Langres
- Canton: Langres

Government
  - Mayor (2020–2026): Alain Goirot
- Area^{1}: 3.72 km^{2} (1.44 sq mi)
- Elevation: 350 m (1,150 ft)
- Highest elevation: 416 m (1,365 ft)
- Lowest elevation: 354 m (1,161 ft)
- Population (2023): 46
  - Density: 12/km^{2} (32/sq mi)
- Time zone: UTC+01:00 (CET)
  - Summer (DST): UTC+02:00 (CEST)
- INSEE/Postal code: 52116 /52360
- ^{1} French Land Register data, which excludes lakes, ponds, glaciers > 1 km^{2} (0.386 sq mi or 247 acres) and river estuaries.

Chatenay-Vaudin (French pronunciation: [ʃatnɛ vodɛ̃]) is a commune in the Haute-Marne department in north-eastern France. Its current population is 48.

== See also ==
- Communes of the Haute-Marne department
