= James C. Humes =

American author and former presidential speechwriter

James Calhoun Humes
- Born: October 31, 1934; Williamsport, PA
- Died: August 21, 2020 (aged 85); Philadelphia, PA
- Education: Williams College (BA, 1957), George Washington University (LLB)
- Occupations: Writer, speechwriter
- Spouse: Dianne Stuart (m. 1957)
- Writing career
- Genres: History, biography

James C. Humes (31 October 1934 – 21 August 2020) was an American author and former presidential speechwriter.

Humes was born in Williamsport, Pennsylvania on 31 October, 1934 to Samuel and Elenor (née Graham) Humes. At age 19 he attended Stowe School on a scholarship, where he met Winston Churchill who advised him, “Young man, study history. In history lie all the secrets of statecraft.” After graduation from Williams College he attended law school at George Washington University. While still in law school he wrote speeches for then-President Dwight Eisenhower. He served one term in the Pennsylvania House of Representatives 1963-1965 representing Lycoming county.

Humes, along with William Safire and Pat Buchanan, is credited for authoring the text on the Apollo 11 lunar plaque. Humes has written many books sharing his extensive knowledge of the modern history and political landscape.

== Selected works ==
External videos
- Booknotes interview with Humes on Confessions of a White House Ghostwriter, June 22, 1997, C-SPAN

- The Wit and Wisdom of Abraham Lincoln: A Book of Quotations, 2005
- Speak Like Churchill, Stand Like Lincoln: 21 Powerful Secrets of History's Greatest Speakers, 2002
- The Wit & Wisdom of Ronald Reagan, 2007
- The Wit & Wisdom of Benjamin Franklin, 2001
- The Wit & Wisdom of Winston Churchill: A Treasury of More Than 1,000 Quotations and Anecdotes, 1994
- The Sir Winston Method: The Five Secrets of Speaking the Language of Leadership, 1991
- Confessions of a White House Ghostwriter: Five presidents and Other Political Adventures, 1997
- Eisenhower and Churchill: The Partnership That Saved the World, 2001
- How to Get Invited to the White House ... and Over One Hundred Impressive Gambits, Foxy Face-Savers, and Clever Maneuvers, 1977
- Instant Eloquence; A Lazy Man's Guide to Public Speaking, 1985
- Nixon's Ten Commandments of Statecraft: His Guiding Principles of Leadership and Negotiation, 1997 (Simon & Schuster)
- Churchill: The Prophetic Statesman, 2012 (Regnery Publishing)
