= Canton of Langres =

Coordinates: 47.86°N 5.33°E

The canton of Langres is an administrative division of the Haute-Marne department, northeastern France. Its borders were modified at the French canton reorganisation which came into effect in March 2015. Its seat is in Langres.

It consists of the following communes:

1. Beauchemin
2. Champigny-lès-Langres
3. Chanoy
4. Chatenay-Mâcheron
5. Chatenay-Vaudin
6. Faverolles
7. Humes-Jorquenay
8. Langres
9. Lecey
10. Marac
11. Mardor
12. Ormancey
13. Peigney
14. Perrancey-les-Vieux-Moulins
15. Saint-Ciergues
16. Saint-Martin-lès-Langres
17. Saint-Maurice
18. Saints-Geosmes
