= Humes-Jorquenay =

- Commune
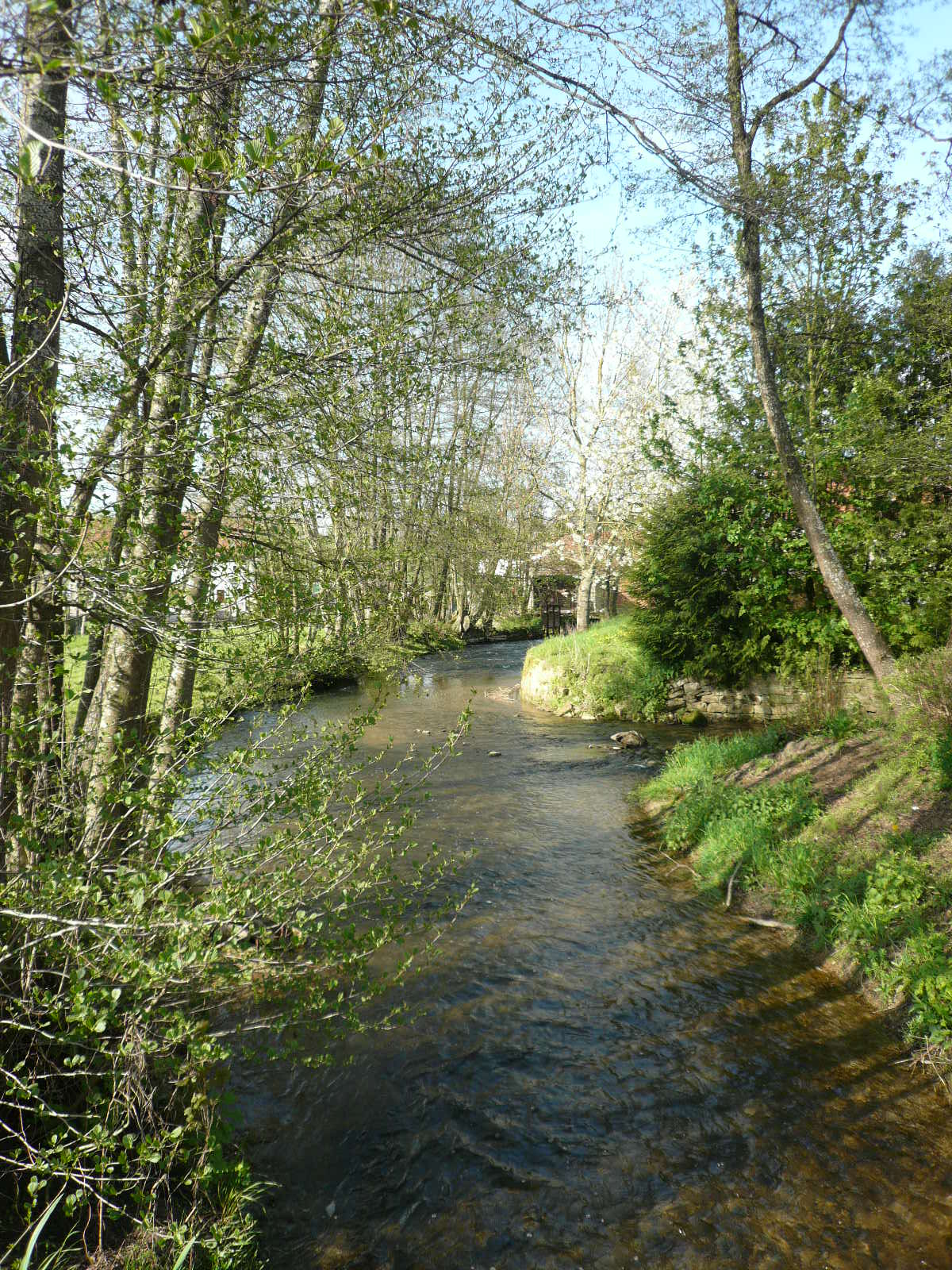
- The Mouche river in Humes

- Coat of arms
- Location of Humes-Jorquenay
- Location within France Location within Grand Est
- Coordinates: 47°54′14″N 5°18′10″E
- Country: France
- Region: Grand Est
- Department: Haute-Marne
- Arrondissement: Langres
- Canton: Langres
- Intercommunality: Grand Langres

Government
  - Mayor (2020–2026): Henri Linares
- Area^{1}: 15.64 km^{2} (6.04 sq mi)
- Elevation: 325 m (1,066 ft)
- Highest elevation: 452 m (1,483 ft)
- Lowest elevation: 313 m (1,027 ft)
- Population (2023): 594
  - Density: 38.0/km^{2} (98.4/sq mi)
- Demonym(s): Hûmois, Hûmoises
- Time zone: UTC+01:00 (CET)
  - Summer (DST): UTC+02:00 (CEST)
- INSEE/Postal code: 52246 /52200
- ^{1} French Land Register data, which excludes lakes, ponds, glaciers > 1 km^{2} (0.386 sq mi or 247 acres) and river estuaries.

Humes-Jorquenay (French pronunciation: [ym ʒɔʁkənɛ]) is a commune in the Haute-Marne department in north-eastern France.

== See also ==
- Communes of the Haute-Marne department
