= Saint-Urbain-Maconcourt =

- Commune
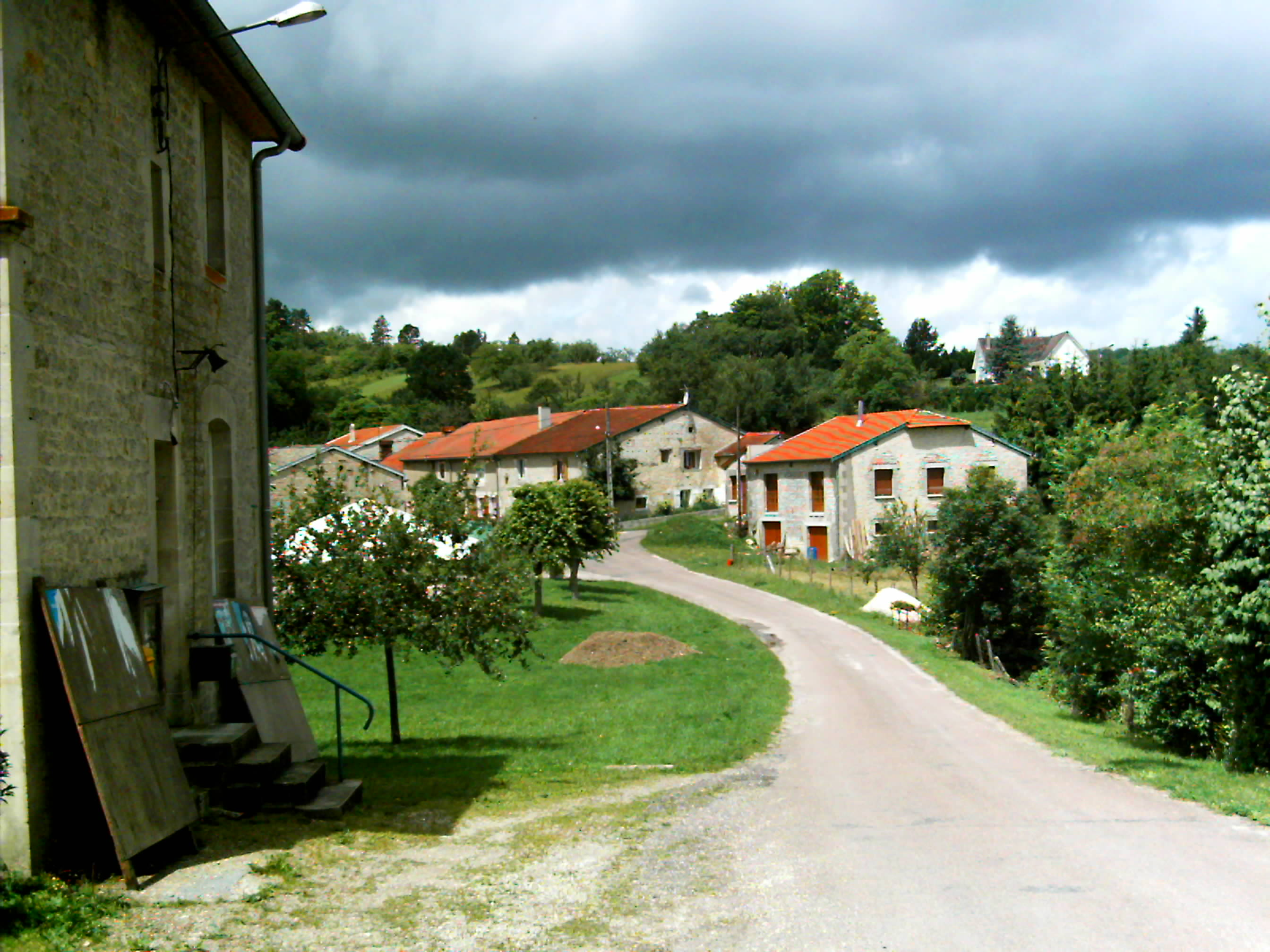
- A view within Maconcourt

- Coat of arms
- Location of Saint-Urbain-Maconcourt
- Location within France Location within Grand Est
- Coordinates: 48°24′05″N 5°10′59″E
- Country: France
- Region: Grand Est
- Department: Haute-Marne
- Arrondissement: Saint-Dizier
- Canton: Joinville
- Intercommunality: Bassin de Joinville en Champagne

Government
  - Mayor (2020–2026): Judith Burot
- Area^{1}: 25.85 km^{2} (9.98 sq mi)
- Elevation: 216 m (709 ft)
- Highest elevation: 377 m (1,237 ft)
- Lowest elevation: 187 m (614 ft)
- Population (2023): 598
  - Density: 23.1/km^{2} (59.9/sq mi)
- Time zone: UTC+01:00 (CET)
  - Summer (DST): UTC+02:00 (CEST)
- INSEE/Postal code: 52456 /52300
- ^{1} French Land Register data, which excludes lakes, ponds, glaciers > 1 km^{2} (0.386 sq mi or 247 acres) and river estuaries.

Saint-Urbain-Maconcourt (French pronunciation: [sɛ̃.t‿yʁbɛ̃ makɔ̃kuʁ]) is a commune in the Haute-Marne department in north-eastern France. It was created in 1973 by the merger of two former communes: Saint-Urbain-sur-Marne and Maconcourt.

== Geography ==
Saint-Urbain-Maconcourt is located about 32 km north-northeast of Chaumont, Haute-Marne. The Marne forms the commune's western boundary. Saint-Urbain-Maconcourt is bordered by Joinville to the northwest and north, Suzannecourt to the north, Poissons to the north and northeast, Noncourt-sur-le-Rongeant to the northeast, Annonville to the east, Domremy-Landéville to the southeast, Vaux-sur-Saint-Urbain to the south, Donjeux to the south and southwest, Mussey-sur-Marne to the southwest, Fronville to the west, and Rupt to the northwest.

== Population ==
Population development
Year	1962	1968	1975	1982	1990	1999	2006	2019
Population	631	698	754	727	707	659	644	638

== See also ==
- Communes of the Haute-Marne department
