= Armand Jean d'Allonville =

French noble

Armand Jean d'Allonville (13 July 1732, Dommartin-le-Saint-Père, Toul diocese, Champagne – 24 January 1811, London) was a French nobleman from an old family in Beauce. He was nicknamed le balafré ("Scarface") and served as maréchal des Camps et des armées du Roi, commander of the exiled Les Gentilshommes de la province de Champagne, then those of Brittany and the régiment d'Allonville.

== Family ==
He was a member of the Oysonville-Arnancourt branch of the Allonville family, named after their fiefdoms in Beauce, then in Champagne. He was one of the sons of Marquis Edmé d'Allonville (1694–1783) and the brother of Antoine Charles Augustin d'Allonville, who was killed defended the Tuileries Palace in the insurrection of 10 August 1792, and of Count Jean-Nicolas d’Allonville de Mellet, officers of the Chevaliers de la couronne, killed in the Army of Condé on 2 December 1793 at the Battle of Berstheim, the first émigré and Austrian victory over the French, while protecting the Louis Antoine, Duke of Enghien.

== Life ==
=== 1745–1791 ===
During the War of the Austrian Succession, Armand entered the French army at the end of 1745 as a cornet in the régiment Lameth-Cavalerie. His first battle, aged 14, in 1746, at the Siege of Mons, under marshal Maurice de Saxe. Then he took part in the Battle of Rocourt and the Battle of Lauffeld, in 1746 and 1747. He continued serving in the army until the Treaty of Aix-la-Chapelle (1748).

Between the two wars, he was made lieutenant in the régiment Royal-Carabiniers, then in 1756 - at the start of the Seven Years' War - he was a captain in the régiment de cavalerie de Lameth. He received 15 sabre cuts at the battle of Rossbach, including ten to the head, giving rise to the scar or 'balafre' which gave him his nickname. Carried off the battlefield, he won the cross of the order of saint Louis, still aged only 25 (ribbons were much less numerous under the Ancien Régime and reserved for older officers with at least 25 years' service as an officer).

In 1767, the king made him a captain in the régiment Royal-Carabiniers and then capitaine-major. In 1770, he became a lieutenant-colonel of the five brigades of this elite regiment, then in 1776, second-colonel of the régiment de Mestre de Camp of cavalry. He became colonel of the 5th light cavalry regiment at Verdun in 1779, a regiment created on 29 January of the same year. He rose to brigadier des armées du roi on 1 March 1780 and then maréchal de camp on 1 January 1784. In 1788 he was put in command of a large cavalry brigade, in the 2nd division of 'évêchés', commissioned by marquis André-Claude de Chamborant.

In the meantime, on 29 February 1764, d'Allonville married Marie-Françoise Jehannot de Bartillat (1744–1817). She was the daughter of marquis Louis Joachim Jehannot de Bartillat (1711–1748), marquis de Bartillat, baron d'Huriel, colonel of a dragoon regiment named after him, formerly the Dragons de Condé.

=== French Revolution ===
==== Provincial syndic procurer for the nobility and clergy (1789) ====
Before the Revolution, Armand Jean d'Allonville came to Langres, where he had lands, but

=== Later life (1796–1811) ===
D’Allonville was made maréchal de camp of the counter-revolutionary armée des émigrés, by king's brevet, dated from Blakembourg, on 15 November 1797, effective from 15 March 1794. With a daily pension of five shillings a day, after his troops were dismissed, d'Allonville lived in England in poverty. He is recorded in London on 12 April 1806 and died there on 24 January 1811. He was buried in St Pancras Churchyard.

== Bibliography ==
- Jean Pinasseau, L’émigration militaire. Campagne de 1792, Armée royale, I, composition, ordres de bataille, notices À à C, Paris, 1957, p. 78-79.
- BARTILLAT (Christian de), Une famille noble en Seine-et-Marne à la fin de l’Ancien Régime. Les d’Allonville, les Maistre et les Bartillat entre Verdelot, La Ferté-Gaucher et Vaudoy (1763–1791), 1999, 59-76.
