= Baudrecourt =

Baudrecourt is the name of two communes in France:

- Baudrecourt, Haute-Marne, in the Haute-Marne département
- Baudrecourt, Moselle, in the Moselle département
