= Arrondissement of Saint-Dizier =

Coordinates: 48.63°N 4.95°E

Saint-Dizier
- Arrondissement
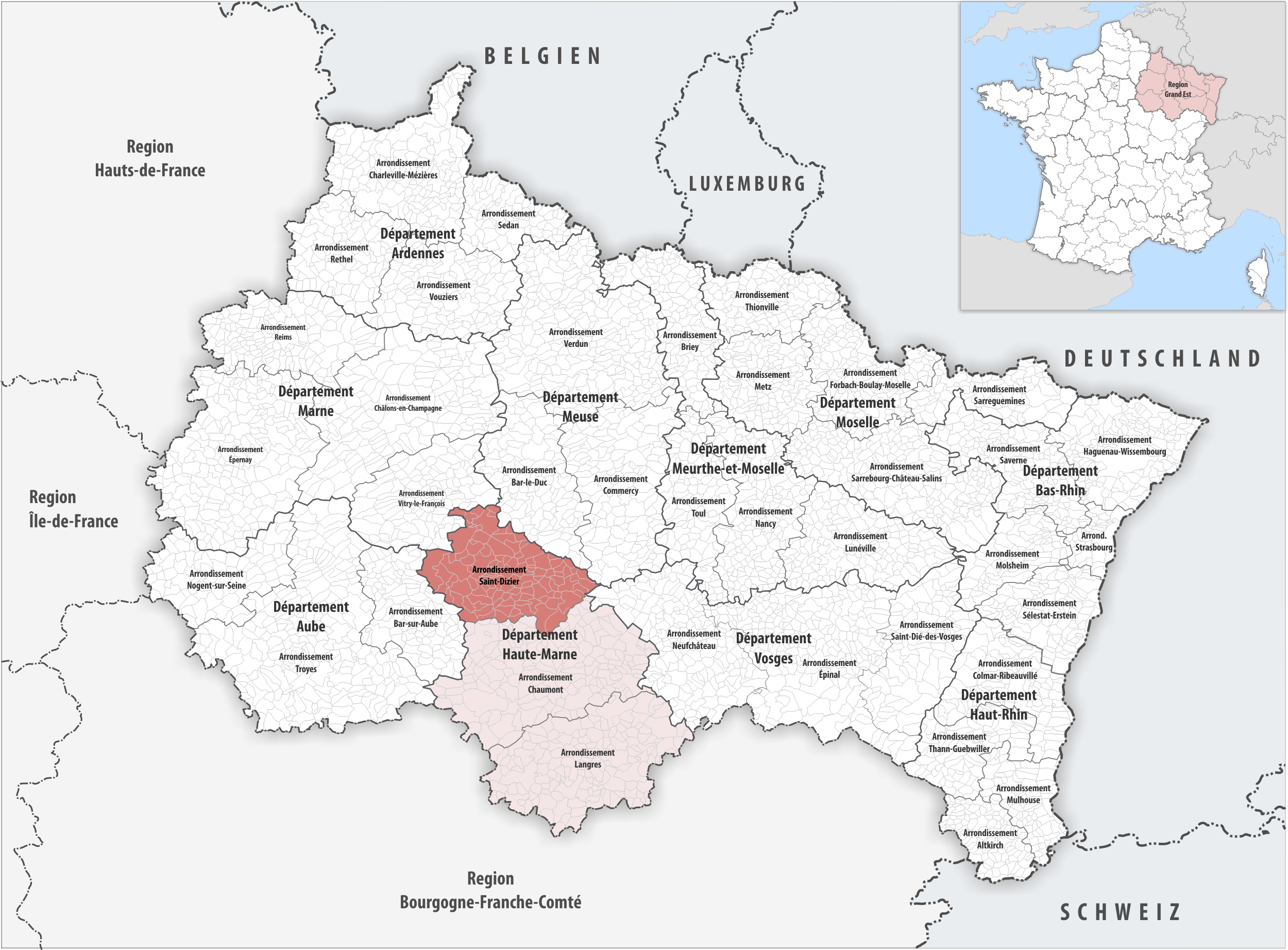
- Location within the region Grand Est
- Country: France
- Region: Grand Est
- Department: Haute-Marne
- No. of communes: {{{nbcomm}}}
- Area: 1,571.4 km^{2} (606.7 sq mi)
- Population (2023): 65,724
  - Density: 41.825/km^{2} (108.33/sq mi)
- INSEE code: 523

The arrondissement of Saint-Dizier is an arrondissement of France in the Haute-Marne department in the Grand Est region. It has 111 communes. Its population is 66,529 (2021), and its area is 1,571.4 km^{2} (606.7 sq mi).

== Composition ==
The communes of the arrondissement of Saint-Dizier, and their INSEE codes, are:

1. Aingoulaincourt (52004)
2. Allichamps (52006)
3. Ambonville (52007)
4. Annonville (52012)
5. Arnancourt (52019)
6. Attancourt (52021)
7. Autigny-le-Grand (52029)
8. Autigny-le-Petit (52030)
9. Bailly-aux-Forges (52034)
10. Baudrecourt (52039)
11. Bayard-sur-Marne (52265)
12. Bettancourt-la-Ferrée (52045)
13. Beurville (52047)
14. Blécourt (52055)
15. Blumeray (52057)
16. Bouzancourt (52065)
17. Brachay (52066)
18. Brousseval (52079)
19. Ceffonds (52088)
20. Cerisières (52091)
21. Chamouilley (52099)
22. Chancenay (52104)
23. Charmes-en-l'Angle (52109)
24. Charmes-la-Grande (52110)
25. Chatonrupt-Sommermont (52118)
26. Chevillon (52123)
27. Cirey-sur-Blaise (52129)
28. Cirfontaines-en-Ornois (52131)
29. Courcelles-sur-Blaise (52149)
30. Curel (52156)
31. Domblain (52169)
32. Dommartin-le-Franc (52171)
33. Dommartin-le-Saint-Père (52172)
34. Domremy-Landéville (52173)
35. Donjeux (52175)
36. Doulaincourt-Saucourt (52177)
37. Doulevant-le-Château (52178)
38. Doulevant-le-Petit (52179)
39. Échenay (52181)
40. Éclaron-Braucourt-Sainte-Livière (52182)
41. Effincourt (52184)
42. Épizon (52187)
43. Eurville-Bienville (52194)
44. Fays (52198)
45. Ferrière-et-Lafolie (52199)
46. Flammerécourt (52201)
47. Fontaines-sur-Marne (52203)
48. Frampas (52206)
49. Fronville (52212)
50. Germay (52218)
51. Germisay (52219)
52. Gillaumé (52222)
53. Gudmont-Villiers (52230)
54. Guindrecourt-aux-Ormes (52231)
55. Hallignicourt (52235)
56. Humbécourt (52244)
57. Joinville (52250)
58. Laneuville-à-Rémy (52266)
59. Laneuville-au-Pont (52267)
60. Leschères-sur-le-Blaiseron (52284)
61. Lezéville (52288)
62. Louvemont (52294)
63. Magneux (52300)
64. Maizières (52302)
65. Mathons (52316)
66. Mertrud (52321)
67. Moëslains (52327)
68. Montreuil-sur-Blaise (52336)
69. Montreuil-sur-Thonnance (52337)
70. Morancourt (52341)
71. Mussey-sur-Marne (52346)
72. Narcy (52347)
73. Nomécourt (52356)
74. Noncourt-sur-le-Rongeant (52357)
75. Nully (52359)
76. Osne-le-Val (52370)
77. Pancey (52376)
78. Paroy-sur-Saulx (52378)
79. Perthes (52386)
80. Planrupt (52391)
81. Poissons (52398)
82. La Porte du Der (52331)
83. Rachecourt-Suzémont (52413)
84. Rachecourt-sur-Marne (52414)
85. Rives-Dervoises (52411)
86. Roches-Bettaincourt (52044)
87. Roches-sur-Marne (52429)
88. Rouécourt (52436)
89. Rouvroy-sur-Marne (52440)
90. Rupt (52442)
91. Sailly (52443)
92. Saint-Dizier (52448)
93. Saint-Urbain-Maconcourt (52456)
94. Saudron (52463)
95. Sommancourt (52475)
96. Sommevoire (52479)
97. Suzannecourt (52484)
98. Thilleux (52487)
99. Thonnance-les-Moulins (52491)
100. Thonnance-lès-Joinville (52490)
101. Trémilly (52495)
102. Troisfontaines-la-Ville (52497)
103. Valcourt (52500)
104. Valleret (52502)
105. Vaux-sur-Blaise (52510)
106. Vaux-sur-Saint-Urbain (52511)
107. Vecqueville (52512)
108. Ville-en-Blaisois (52528)
109. Villiers-en-Lieu (52534)
110. Voillecomte (52543)
111. Wassy (52550)

== History ==
The arrondissement of Wassy was created in 1800 and disbanded in 1926. It was restored in 1940, and its subprefecture was moved to Saint-Dizier.

As a result of the reorganisation of the cantons of France which came into effect in 2015, the borders of the cantons are no longer related to the borders of the arrondissements. The cantons of the arrondissement of Saint-Dizier were, as of January 2015:

1. Chevillon
2. Doulaincourt-Saucourt
3. Doulevant-le-Château
4. Joinville
5. Montier-en-Der
6. Poissons
7. Saint-Dizier-Centre
8. Saint-Dizier-Nord-Est
9. Saint-Dizier-Ouest
10. Saint-Dizier-Sud-Est
11. Wassy
