= Philippe Lebon =

French engineer (1767–1804)

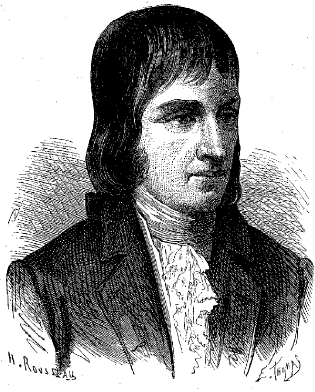
- Philippe Lebon
- Born: May 29, 1767; Brachay
- Died: December 1, 1804 (aged 37)

Philippe le Bon (or Lebon) (D'Humbersin) (French pronunciation: [filip ləbɔ̃]; May 29, 1767 – December 1, 1804) was a French engineer, born in Brachay, France.

On 10 March 1792, he married Cornélie de Brambilla, who later fought on his behalf for monies owed to him and continued his work after his death.

There is much confusion about his life and accomplishments. His main contributions were improvements to steam engines and industrialising the extraction of lighting gas from wood. Following details published in readings for young people, Lebon has long been purported to have been assassinated on the eve of Napoleon's crowning ceremony, at the beginning of December 1804. While the actual time of death seems to be December 1 at 10 am, there are no contemporary evidence to sustain the story: legal documents produced by the Archives Nationales upon the 150th jubilee of Lebon make it clear that neither the engineer's servant, Euphrasie Hubert, nor the justice practitioner committed to the post mortem inventory did mention any criminal circumstance, nor any wound on the body. Joseph Gaudry, Lebon's nephew and heir, only mentions family rumors in his 1856 writing. Lebon's correspondence during the last months of his life make it clear he had been suffering from illness and lack of medical assistance for weeks before his untimely death.

He also designed, though apparently did not build, a wood gas engine. (Not the first.) Like other early engines, it had no compression in its main cylinder. It has three mechanically connected cylinders, each double-acting, one to compress the air, one to compress the gas, and one driven by the burned mixture. This engine resembles an internal combustion engine, but the combustion actually takes place in a combustion chamber separated by mechanically controlled valves from the cylinders. This makes it a steam engine running on combustion products instead of on steam, or the piston equivalent of a gas turbine.

Hardenberg's analysis shows a theoretical efficiency and specific power much less than those of the earlier Street engine, but this assumes that the intake valve stays open during the whole power stroke. Assuming that the inventor had more in his mind than what he wrote on paper and therefore allowing arbitrary valve timing, its idealized thermodynamic cycle is similar to that of a gas turbine, which can have a high compression ratio and relatively high efficiency. This assumes, contrary to what Hardenberg seems to assume, that the combustion chamber would have been big enough to act as a pressure reservoir. Of course, one's place in history depends on what one does and writes more than on what one can be assumed to have thought. Certainly, all but possibly Hardenberg must have seen that it would give more room for optimization than the Street engine did. The reasons that it has never been used must be the obvious thermal and mechanical problems, such as heat loss from the combustion products to the containing structures.

In 1801, Philippe Lebon invented an engine that improved on Robert Steele's design. It used coal gas ignited by an electric spark. This was one of the first internal combustion engines. Although very inefficient, it would later be improved, as internal combustion is used in modern cars.
