= List of aerial victories of Kurt Wolff =

List of aerial victories of Kurt Wolff

Kurt Wolff was a German flying ace of the First World War. He scored 33 aerial victories in the four months from 6 March to 7 July 1917. He scored his first 29 victories while flying in Jagdstaffel 11. Two more victories came while he was temporarily commanding Jagdstaffel 29. Posted back to Jagdstaffel 11 as commander, Wolff scored his final two victories. Wolff's 24th victory was a notable one, as he killed Major H. D. Harvey-Kelly.

This list is complete for entries, though obviously not for all details. Double break in list marks transition between jagdstaffeln. Information was abstracted from Above the Lines: The Aces and Fighter Units of the German Air Service, Naval Air Service and Flanders Marine Corps, 1914–1918, ISBN 0-948817-73-9, ISBN 978-0-948817-73-1, p. 233. Abbreviations from those sources were expanded by editor creating this list.

No.	Date/time	Victim	Squadron	Location
1	6 March 1917 @ 1230 hours	Royal Aircraft Factory B.E.2d	No. 16 Squadron RFC	Givenchy, France
2	9 March 1917 @ 1020 hours	Royal Aircraft Factory F.E.8	No. 40 Squadron RFC	Annay, France
3	17 March 1917 @ 1145 hours	Sopwith 1 1/2 Strutter	No. 43 Squadron RFC	Southwest of Athies, France
4	30 March 1917 @ 1145 hours	Nieuport 17	No. 60 Squadron RFC	East of Gavrelle, France
5	31 March 1917 @ 0750 hours	Royal Aircraft Factory F.E.2b	No. 11 Squadron RFC	Gavrelle, France
6	6 April 1917 @ 1015 hours	Royal Aircraft Factory R.E.8	No. 59 Squadron RFC	Bois-Bernard, France
7	7 April 1917 @ 1745 hours	Nieuport 27	No. 60 Squadron RFC	Mercatel, France
8	8 April 1917 @ 1430 hours	Airco DH.4	No. 55 Squadron RFC	Northeast of Blécourt, France
9	11 April 1917 @ 0910 hours	Bristol F.2 Fighter	No. 48 Squadron RFC	North of Fismes, France
10	13 April 1917 @ 0856 hours	Royal Aircraft Factory R.E.8	No. 59 Squadron RFC	North of Vitry, France
11	13 April 1917 @ 1235 hours	Royal Aircraft Factory F.E.2b	No. 11 Squadron RFC	South of Bailleul, France
12	13 April 1917 @ 1630 hours	Nieuport 17	No. 29 Squadron RFC	South of Monchy, France
13	13 April 1917 @ 1852 hours	Martinsyde G.100	No. 27 Squadron RFC	Rouvroy
14	14 April 1917 @ 0920 hours	Nieuport 17	No. 60 Squadron RFC	Southeast of Drocourt, France
15	14 April 1917 @ 1829 hours	Spad S.VII	No. 19 Squadron RFC	East of Bailleul, France
16	16 April 1917 @ 1030 hours	Nieuport 17	No. 60 Squadron RFC	Northeast of Roeux, France
17	21 April 1917 @ 1730 hours	Royal Aircraft Factory B.E.2g	No. 16 Squadron RFC	West of Willerval, France
18	21 April 1917 @ 1745 hours	Nieuport 23	No. 29 Squadron RFC	East of Fresnes, France
19	22 April 1917 @ 1710 hours	Royal Aircraft Factory F.E.2b	No. 11 Squadron RFC	Hendecourt, France
20	22 April 1917 @ 2005 hours	Morane Parasol	No. 3 Squadron RFC	Havrincourt, France
21	26 April 1917 @ 1635 hours	Royal Aircraft Factory B.E.2g	No. 5 Squadron RFC	East of Gavrelle, France
22	27 April 1917 @ 2020 hours	Royal Aircraft Factory F.E.2b	No. 11 Squadron RFC	South of Gavrelle, France
23	28 April 1917 @ 1120 hours	Royal Aircraft Factory B.E.2g	No. 16 Squadron RFC	South of Oppy, Pas-de-Calais, France
24	29 April 1917 @ 1210 hours	Spad S.VII	No. 19 Squadron RFC	Sailly, France
25	29 April 1917 @ 1700 hours	Royal Aircraft Factory F.E.2b	No. 18 Squadron RFC	South of Pronville-en-Artois, France
26	29 April 1917 @ 1745 hours	Royal Aircraft Factory B.E.2f	No. 16 Squadron RFC	West of Gavrelles, France
27	30 April 1917 @ 1735 hours	Royal Aircraft Factory B.E.2e	No. 13 Squadron RFC	West of Fresnes, France
28	1 May 1917 @ 1050 hours	Sopwith Triplane	No. 8 (Naval) Squadron	South of Seclin
29	1 May 1917 @ 1855 hours	Royal Aircraft Factory F.E.2b	No. 25 Squadron RFC	South of Bois Bernard, France
30	13 May 1917 @ 1155 hours	SPAD	Escadrille N.37, Service Aéronautique	Beine, France
31	27 June 1917 @ 2030 hours	Nieuport 23	No. 29 Squadron RFC	Southwest of Noyelles
32	6 July 1917 @ 2120 hours	Royal Aircraft Factory R.E.8	No. 4 Squadron RFC	Zillebeke, Belgium
33	7 July 1917 @ 1100 hours	Sopwith Triplane	No. 1 (Naval) Squadron	Comines, France
