= Montreuil-sur-Thonnance =

- Commune
- Location of Montreuil-sur-Thonnance
- Location within France Location within Grand Est
- Coordinates: 48°27′35″N 5°14′13″E
- Country: France
- Region: Grand Est
- Department: Haute-Marne
- Arrondissement: Saint-Dizier
- Canton: Poissons

Government
  - Mayor (2020–2026): Hervé Lavenarde
- Area^{1}: 8.09 km^{2} (3.12 sq mi)
- Elevation: 277 m (909 ft)
- Highest elevation: 390 m (1,280 ft)
- Lowest elevation: 234 m (768 ft)
- Population (2023): 70
  - Density: 8.7/km^{2} (22/sq mi)
- Time zone: UTC+01:00 (CET)
  - Summer (DST): UTC+02:00 (CEST)
- INSEE/Postal code: 52337 /52230
- ^{1} French Land Register data, which excludes lakes, ponds, glaciers > 1 km^{2} (0.386 sq mi or 247 acres) and river estuaries.

Montreuil-sur-Thonnance (French pronunciation: [mɔ̃tʁœj syʁ tɔnɑ̃s], literally Montreuil on Thonnance) is a commune in the Haute-Marne department in north-eastern France.

== See also ==
- Communes of the Haute-Marne department
