= Rognon =

Rognon is culinary French for kidney and may refer to:

== Places ==
- Rognon (Marne), a river in France, tributary of the Marne
- Rognon (Scey), a river in France, tributary of the Scey (Rhône basin)
- Bourdons-sur-Rognon, Haute-Marne, France; a commune
- Lanques-sur-Rognon, Haute-Marne, France; a commune
- Rognon, Doubs, Bourgogne-Franche-Comté, France; a commune
- Rebecq-Rognon, Rebecq, Walloon Brabant, Walloonia, Belgium; a municipal district

== Other uses ==
- Charles Amédée Rognon, French colonial administrator, lieutenant governor of Gabon
- a rock rognon (synonym: nunatak) projecting through a glacier
