= Blécourt =

Blécourt is the name of the following communes in France:

- Blécourt, Haute-Marne, in the Haute-Marne department
- Blécourt, Nord, in the Nord department
