= Auguste Laurent =

French chemist (1807–1853)

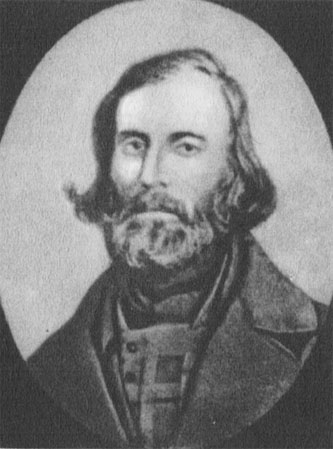
- Born: 14 November 1807; La Folie near Langres
- Died: 15 April 1853 (aged 45); Paris
- Known for: anthracene phthalic acid carbolic acid
- Scientific career
- Fields: chemistry
- Thesis: Recherches diverses de chimie organique sur la densité des argiles cuites à diverses températures (1837)

Auguste Laurent (14 November 1807 – 15 April 1853) was a French chemist who helped in the founding of organic chemistry with his discoveries of trichloroethylene, anthracene, phthalic acid, and carbolic acid.

He devised a systematic nomenclature for organic chemistry based on structural grouping of atoms within molecules to determine how the molecules combine in organic reactions. He studied under Jean-Baptiste Dumas as a laboratory assistant. At that time, the weight of carbon was considered to be 6. Laurent thought that a weight of 12 was more logical, and started drawing structures on that basis. He published his work in conjunction with Charles Frédéric Gerhardt. Shunned by Dumas, he eked out a living teaching in the mineral engineering lab - where he taught a young Louis Pasteur how to crystalize tartaric acid. Laurent died in Paris from tuberculosis. Alexander Williamson in England read Laurent's writing, leading to the Williamson Ether Synthesis that confirmed the validity of Laurent's approach.

== Bibliography ==
Marc Tiffeneau (ed.) (1918). Correspondance de Charles Gerhardt, tome 1, Laurent et Gerhardt, Paris, Masson.
