= Charmes-en-l'Angle =

- Commune
- Location of Charmes-en-l'Angle
- Location within France Location within Grand Est
- Coordinates: 48°22′30″N 5°00′11″E
- Country: France
- Region: Grand Est
- Department: Haute-Marne
- Arrondissement: Saint-Dizier
- Canton: Joinville
- Intercommunality: Bassin de Joinville en Champagne

Government
  - Mayor (2020–2026): Charles Dubois
- Area^{1}: 7.36 km^{2} (2.84 sq mi)
- Elevation: 224 m (735 ft)
- Highest elevation: 347 m (1,138 ft)
- Lowest elevation: 221 m (725 ft)
- Population (2023): 6
  - Density: 0.82/km^{2} (2.1/sq mi)
- Time zone: UTC+01:00 (CET)
  - Summer (DST): UTC+02:00 (CEST)
- INSEE/Postal code: 52109 /52110
- ^{1} French Land Register data, which excludes lakes, ponds, glaciers > 1 km^{2} (0.386 sq mi or 247 acres) and river estuaries.

Charmes-en-l'Angle (French pronunciation: [ʃaʁm ɑ̃ lɑ̃ɡl]) is a commune in the Haute-Marne department in north-eastern France.

== Population ==
Historical population
Year	Pop.	±% p.a.
1968	14	—
1975	12	−2.18%
1982	11	−1.24%
1990	9	−2.48%
1999	6	−4.41%
2007	10	+6.59%
2012	6	−9.71%
2017	10	+10.76%
2023	6	−8.16%
Source: INSEE

== See also ==
- Communes of the Haute-Marne department
