= Rognon (Marne) =

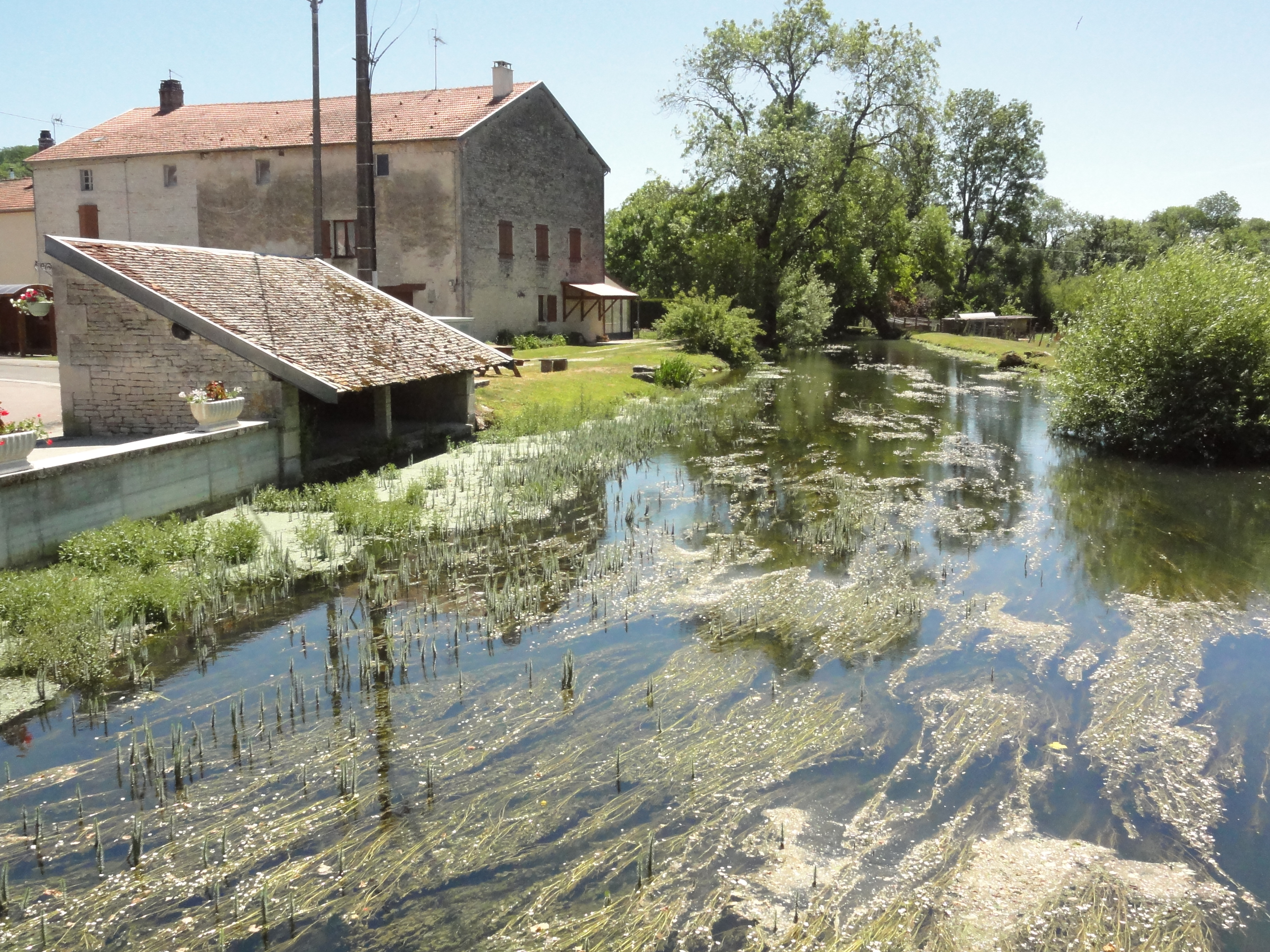

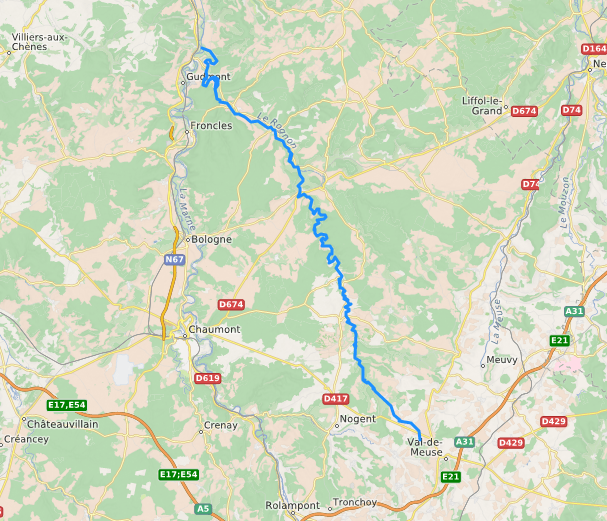

Location
- Country: France

Physical characteristics
- Mouth: Marne
  - location: Mussey-sur-Marne
  - coordinates: 48°22′33″N 5°09′41″E
- Length: 73 km (45 mi)

Basin features
- Progression: Marne→ Seine→ English Channel

The Rognon (French pronunciation: [ʁɔɲɔ̃]) is a 73 km long river in France, right tributary of the Marne. Its source is near the village Is-en-Bassigny. It flows generally northwest, through the department of Haute-Marne. The Rognon flows into the Marne at Mussey-sur-Marne, south of Joinville. Its largest tributary is the Sueurre.
