= Charmes-la-Grande =

- Commune
- Location of Charmes-la-Grande
- Location within France Location within Grand Est
- Coordinates: 48°23′05″N 4°59′39″E
- Country: France
- Region: Grand Est
- Department: Haute-Marne
- Arrondissement: Saint-Dizier
- Canton: Joinville
- Intercommunality: CC Bassin de Joinville en Champagne

Government
  - Mayor (2020–2026): Gilbert Humbert
- Area^{1}: 11.43 km^{2} (4.41 sq mi)
- Elevation: 220 m (720 ft)
- Highest elevation: 321 m (1,053 ft)
- Lowest elevation: 209 m (686 ft)
- Population (2023): 161
  - Density: 14.1/km^{2} (36.5/sq mi)
- Time zone: UTC+01:00 (CET)
  - Summer (DST): UTC+02:00 (CEST)
- INSEE/Postal code: 52110 /52110
- ^{1} French Land Register data, which excludes lakes, ponds, glaciers > 1 km^{2} (0.386 sq mi or 247 acres) and river estuaries.

Charmes-la-Grande (French pronunciation: [ʃaʁm la ɡʁɑ̃d]) is a commune in the Haute-Marne department in north-eastern France.

== See also ==
- Communes of the Haute-Marne department
