= Blumeray =

- Commune
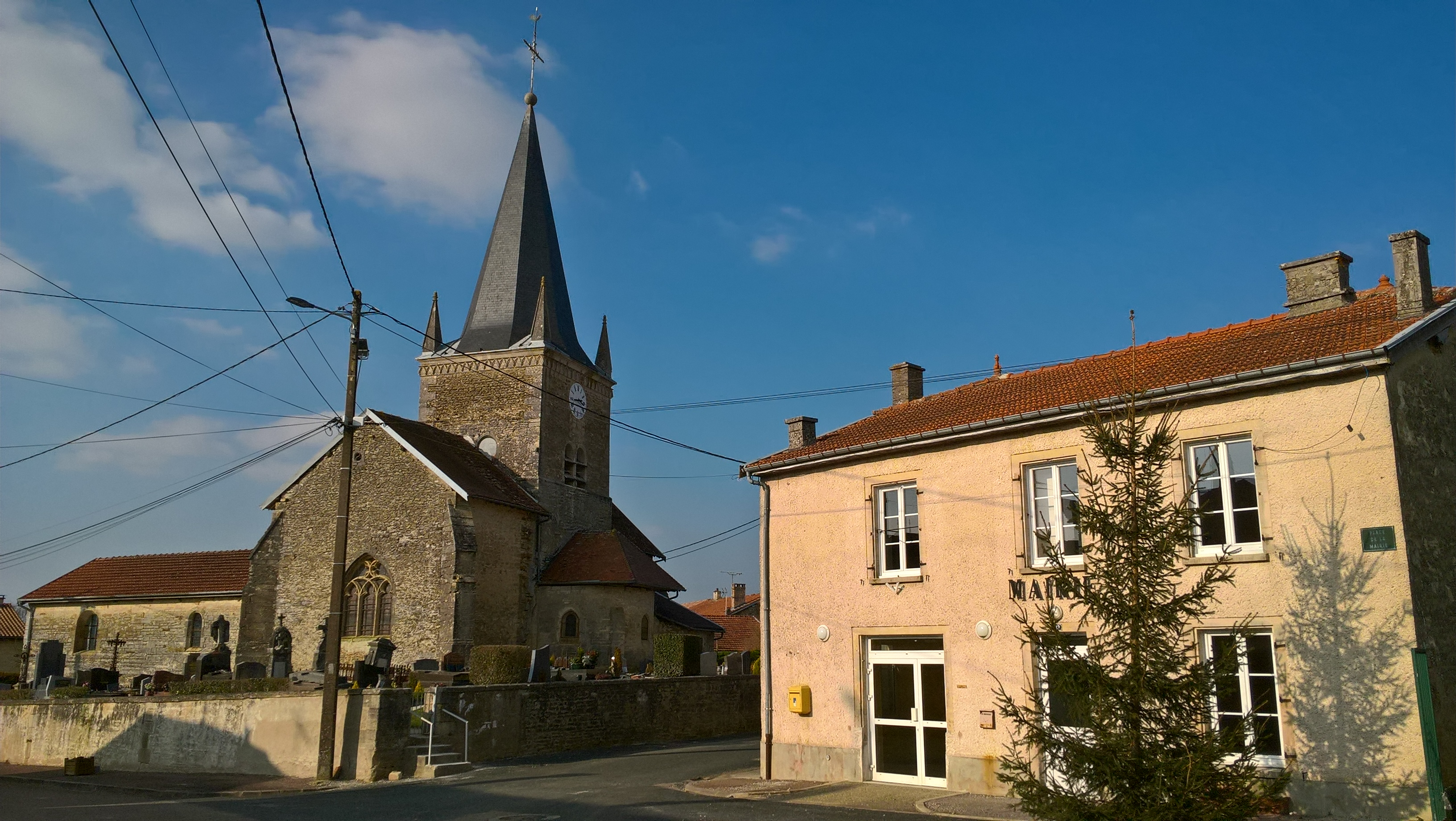
- The church and town hall in Blumeray
- Location of Blumeray
- Location within France Location within Grand Est
- Coordinates: 48°21′58″N 4°51′33″E
- Country: France
- Region: Grand Est
- Department: Haute-Marne
- Arrondissement: Saint-Dizier
- Canton: Joinville

Government
  - Mayor (2020–2026): David Taillefumier
- Area^{1}: 14.68 km^{2} (5.67 sq mi)
- Elevation: 240 m (790 ft)
- Highest elevation: 294 m (965 ft)
- Lowest elevation: 188 m (617 ft)
- Population (2023): 100
  - Density: 6.8/km^{2} (18/sq mi)
- Time zone: UTC+01:00 (CET)
  - Summer (DST): UTC+02:00 (CEST)
- INSEE/Postal code: 52057 /52110
- ^{1} French Land Register data, which excludes lakes, ponds, glaciers > 1 km^{2} (0.386 sq mi or 247 acres) and river estuaries.

Blumeray is a commune in the Haute-Marne department in northeastern France.

== Population ==
Historical population
Year	Pop.	±% p.a.
1968	142	—
1975	114	−3.09%
1982	103	−1.44%
1990	93	−1.27%
1999	108	+1.68%
2007	97	−1.33%
2012	106	+1.79%
2017	109	+0.56%
2023	100	−1.43%
Source: INSEE

== See also ==
- Communes of the Haute-Marne department
