= Rouvroy-sur-Marne =

- Commune
- Coat of arms
- Location of Rouvroy-sur-Marne
- Location within France Location within Grand Est
- Coordinates: 48°21′29″N 5°08′52″E
- Country: France
- Region: Grand Est
- Department: Haute-Marne
- Arrondissement: Saint-Dizier
- Canton: Joinville
- Intercommunality: Bassin de Joinville en Champagne

Government
  - Mayor (2020–2026): Max Michel
- Area^{1}: 8.41 km^{2} (3.25 sq mi)
- Elevation: 208 m (682 ft)
- Highest elevation: 382 m (1,253 ft)
- Lowest elevation: 197 m (646 ft)
- Population (2023): 371
  - Density: 44.1/km^{2} (114/sq mi)
- Time zone: UTC+01:00 (CET)
  - Summer (DST): UTC+02:00 (CEST)
- INSEE/Postal code: 52440 /52300
- ^{1} French Land Register data, which excludes lakes, ponds, glaciers > 1 km^{2} (0.386 sq mi or 247 acres) and river estuaries.

Rouvroy-sur-Marne (French pronunciation: [ʁuvʁwa syʁ maʁn], literally Rouvroy on Marne) is a commune in the Haute-Marne department in north-eastern France.

== See also ==
- Communes of the Haute-Marne department
