= Vaux-sur-Saint-Urbain =

- Commune
- Coat of arms
- Location of Vaux-sur-Saint-Urbain
- Location within France Location within Grand Est
- Coordinates: 48°22′34″N 5°12′33″E
- Country: France
- Region: Grand Est
- Department: Haute-Marne
- Arrondissement: Saint-Dizier
- Canton: Joinville
- Intercommunality: Bassin de Joinville en Champagne

Government
  - Mayor (2020–2026): Christelle Piot
- Area^{1}: 6.4 km^{2} (2.5 sq mi)
- Elevation: 300 m (980 ft)
- Highest elevation: 371 m (1,217 ft)
- Lowest elevation: 203 m (666 ft)
- Population (2023): 58
  - Density: 9.1/km^{2} (23/sq mi)
- Demonym(s): Vauxois, Vauxoises
- Time zone: UTC+01:00 (CET)
  - Summer (DST): UTC+02:00 (CEST)
- INSEE/Postal code: 52511 /52300
- ^{1} French Land Register data, which excludes lakes, ponds, glaciers > 1 km^{2} (0.386 sq mi or 247 acres) and river estuaries.

Vaux-sur-Saint-Urbain (French pronunciation: [vo syʁ sɛ̃.t‿yʁbɛ̃], literally Vaux on Saint-Urbain) is a commune in the Haute-Marne department in north-eastern France.

== See also ==
- Communes of the Haute-Marne department
