= Nomécourt =

- Commune
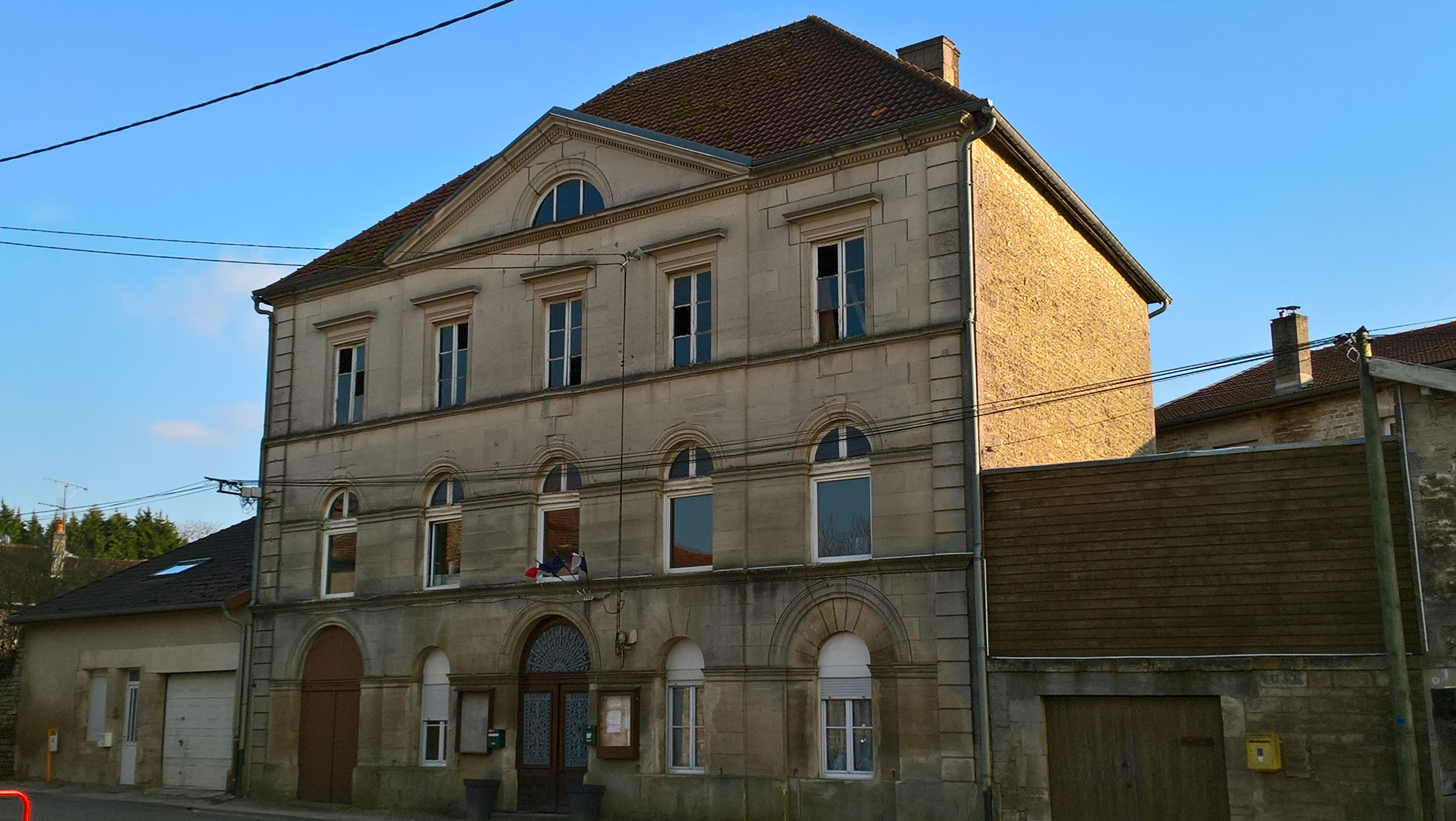
- The town hall in Nomécourt

- Coat of arms
- Location of Nomécourt
- Location within France Location within Grand Est
- Coordinates: 48°26′19″N 5°04′28″E
- Country: France
- Region: Grand Est
- Department: Haute-Marne
- Arrondissement: Saint-Dizier
- Canton: Joinville
- Intercommunality: Bassin de Joinville en Champagne

Government
  - Mayor (2020–2026): Corinne Bouchon
- Area^{1}: 10.77 km^{2} (4.16 sq mi)
- Elevation: 306 m (1,004 ft)
- Highest elevation: 328 m (1,076 ft)
- Lowest elevation: 234 m (768 ft)
- Population (2023): 115
  - Density: 10.7/km^{2} (27.7/sq mi)
- Time zone: UTC+01:00 (CET)
  - Summer (DST): UTC+02:00 (CEST)
- INSEE/Postal code: 52356 /52300
- ^{1} French Land Register data, which excludes lakes, ponds, glaciers > 1 km^{2} (0.386 sq mi or 247 acres) and river estuaries.

Nomécourt (French pronunciation: [nɔmekuʁ]) is a commune in the Haute-Marne department in north-eastern France.

== See also ==
- Communes of the Haute-Marne department
