= Gudmont-Villiers =

- Commune
- Coat of arms
- Location of Gudmont-Villiers
- Location within France Location within Grand Est
- Coordinates: 48°20′40″N 5°08′16″E
- Country: France
- Region: Grand Est
- Department: Haute-Marne
- Arrondissement: Saint-Dizier
- Canton: Joinville
- Intercommunality: Bassin de Joinville en Champagne

Government
  - Mayor (2020–2026): Dominique Pouget
- Area^{1}: 16.77 km^{2} (6.47 sq mi)
- Elevation: 205 m (673 ft)
- Highest elevation: 387 m (1,270 ft)
- Lowest elevation: 200 m (660 ft)
- Population (2023): 278
  - Density: 16.6/km^{2} (42.9/sq mi)
- Time zone: UTC+01:00 (CET)
  - Summer (DST): UTC+02:00 (CEST)
- INSEE/Postal code: 52230 /52320
- ^{1} French Land Register data, which excludes lakes, ponds, glaciers > 1 km^{2} (0.386 sq mi or 247 acres) and river estuaries.

Gudmont-Villiers (French pronunciation: [ɡydmɔ̃ vilje]) is a commune in the Haute-Marne department in north-eastern France.

== See also ==
- Communes of the Haute-Marne department
