= Rupt =

- Commune
- Location of Rupt
- Location within France Location within Grand Est
- Coordinates: 48°25′28″N 5°08′28″E
- Country: France
- Region: Grand Est
- Department: Haute-Marne
- Arrondissement: Saint-Dizier
- Canton: Joinville
- Intercommunality: Bassin de Joinville en Champagne

Government
  - Mayor (2020–2026): Denis Daillet
- Area^{1}: 6.53 km^{2} (2.52 sq mi)
- Elevation: 190 m (620 ft)
- Highest elevation: 344 m (1,129 ft)
- Lowest elevation: 185 m (607 ft)
- Population (2023): 351
  - Density: 53.8/km^{2} (139/sq mi)
- Time zone: UTC+01:00 (CET)
  - Summer (DST): UTC+02:00 (CEST)
- INSEE/Postal code: 52442 /52300
- ^{1} French Land Register data, which excludes lakes, ponds, glaciers > 1 km^{2} (0.386 sq mi or 247 acres) and river estuaries.

Rupt (French pronunciation: [ʁy]) is a commune in the Haute-Marne department in north-eastern France.

== See also ==
- Communes of the Haute-Marne department
