= Autigny-le-Petit =

- Commune
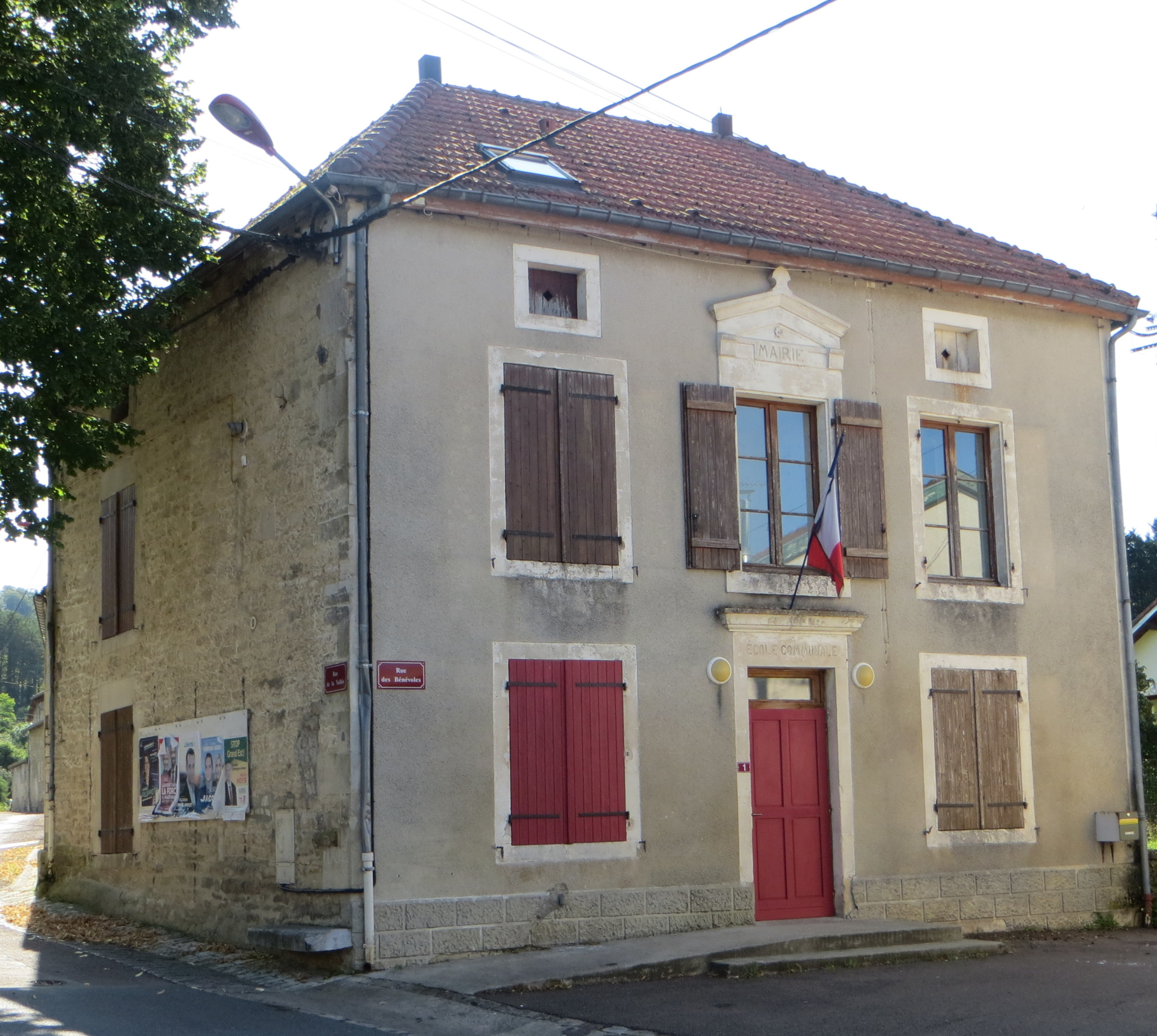
- Town hall
- Location of Autigny-le-Petit
- Location within France Location within Grand Est
- Coordinates: 48°28′57″N 5°08′12″E
- Country: France
- Region: Grand Est
- Department: Haute-Marne
- Arrondissement: Saint-Dizier
- Canton: Joinville
- Intercommunality: CC Bassin Joinville Champagne

Government
  - Mayor (2020–2026): Romain Collin
- Area^{1}: 2.53 km^{2} (0.98 sq mi)
- Elevation: 177 m (581 ft)
- Highest elevation: 326 m (1,070 ft)
- Lowest elevation: 172 m (564 ft)
- Population (2023): 57
  - Density: 23/km^{2} (58/sq mi)
- Time zone: UTC+01:00 (CET)
  - Summer (DST): UTC+02:00 (CEST)
- INSEE/Postal code: 52030 /52300
- ^{1} French Land Register data, which excludes lakes, ponds, glaciers > 1 km^{2} (0.386 sq mi or 247 acres) and river estuaries.

Autigny-le-Petit (French pronunciation: [otiɲi lə pəti]) is a commune in the Haute-Marne department in the Grand Est region in northeastern France.

== Population ==
Historical population
Year	Pop.	±% p.a.
1968	80	—
1975	60	−4.03%
1982	60	+0.00%
1990	75	+2.83%
1999	56	−3.19%
2007	52	−0.92%
2012	52	+0.00%
2017	63	+3.91%
2023	57	−1.65%
Source: INSEE

== See also ==
- Communes of the Haute-Marne department
