= Guindrecourt-aux-Ormes =

- Commune
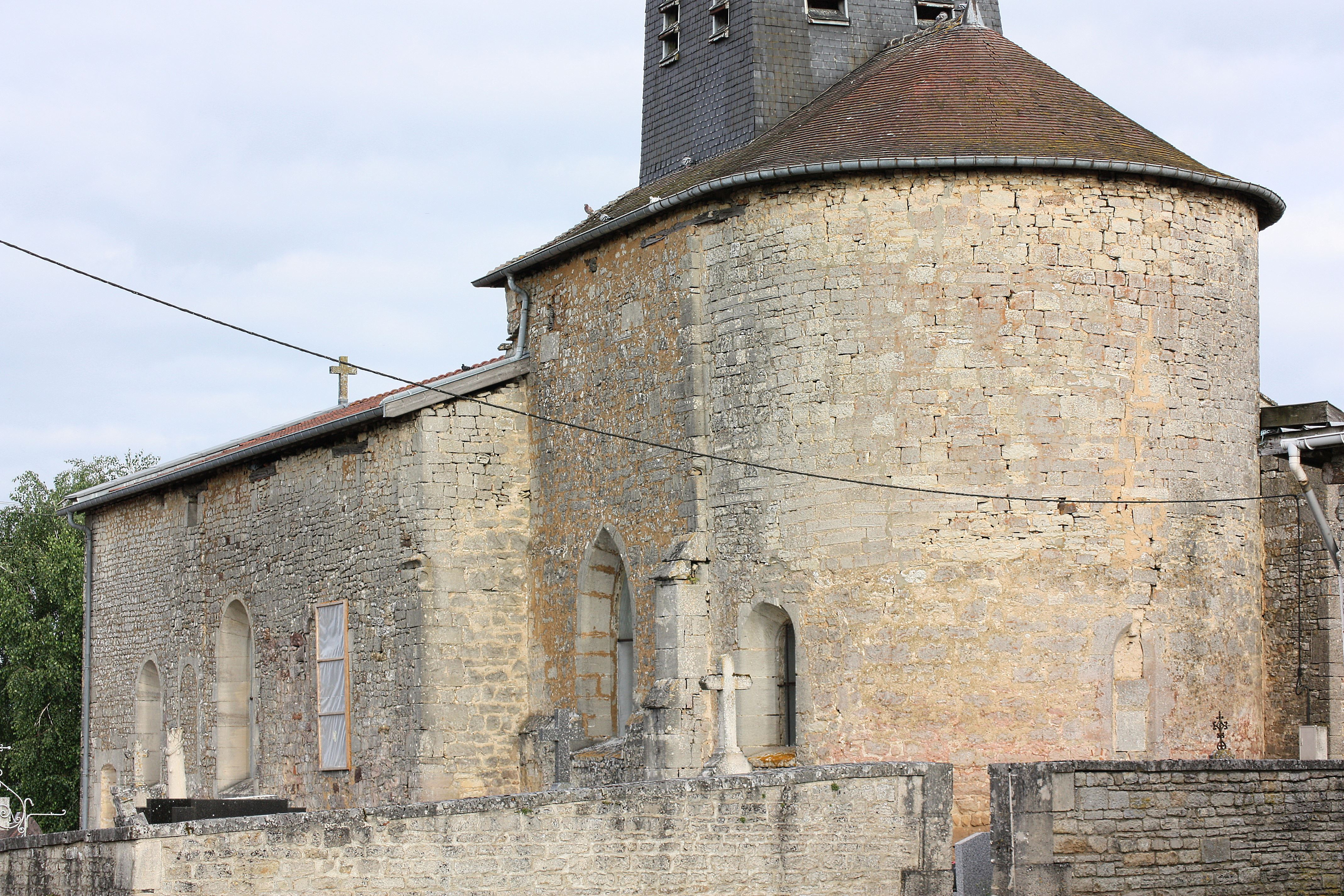
- The church in Guindrecourt-aux-Ormes
- Location of Guindrecourt-aux-Ormes
- Location within France Location within Grand Est
- Coordinates: 48°27′37″N 5°02′08″E
- Country: France
- Region: Grand Est
- Department: Haute-Marne
- Arrondissement: Saint-Dizier
- Canton: Joinville
- Intercommunality: Bassin de Joinville en Champagne

Government
  - Mayor (2020–2026): Pierre Royer
- Area^{1}: 9.07 km^{2} (3.50 sq mi)
- Elevation: 288 m (945 ft)
- Highest elevation: 302 m (991 ft)
- Lowest elevation: 203 m (666 ft)
- Population (2023): 97
  - Density: 11/km^{2} (28/sq mi)
- Time zone: UTC+01:00 (CET)
  - Summer (DST): UTC+02:00 (CEST)
- INSEE/Postal code: 52231 /52300
- ^{1} French Land Register data, which excludes lakes, ponds, glaciers > 1 km^{2} (0.386 sq mi or 247 acres) and river estuaries.

Guindrecourt-aux-Ormes (French pronunciation: [ɡɛ̃dʁəkuʁ o.z‿ɔʁm]) is a commune in the Haute-Marne department in north-eastern France.

== See also ==
- Communes of the Haute-Marne department
