= Ferrière-et-Lafolie =

- Commune
- Location of Ferrière-et-Lafolie
- Location within France Location within Grand Est
- Coordinates: 48°23′33″N 5°05′19″E
- Country: France
- Region: Grand Est
- Department: Haute-Marne
- Arrondissement: Saint-Dizier
- Canton: Joinville
- Intercommunality: Bassin de Joinville en Champagne

Government
  - Mayor (2020–2026): Christian Maigrot
- Area^{1}: 7.93 km^{2} (3.06 sq mi)
- Elevation: 306 m (1,004 ft)
- Highest elevation: 354 m (1,161 ft)
- Lowest elevation: 248 m (814 ft)
- Population (2023): 50
  - Density: 6.3/km^{2} (16/sq mi)
- Time zone: UTC+01:00 (CET)
  - Summer (DST): UTC+02:00 (CEST)
- INSEE/Postal code: 52199 /52300
- ^{1} French Land Register data, which excludes lakes, ponds, glaciers > 1 km^{2} (0.386 sq mi or 247 acres) and river estuaries.

Ferrière-et-Lafolie (French pronunciation: [fɛʁjɛʁ e lafɔli]) is a commune in the Haute-Marne department in north-eastern France.

== See also ==
- Communes of the Haute-Marne department
