= Doulevant-le-Château =

- Commune
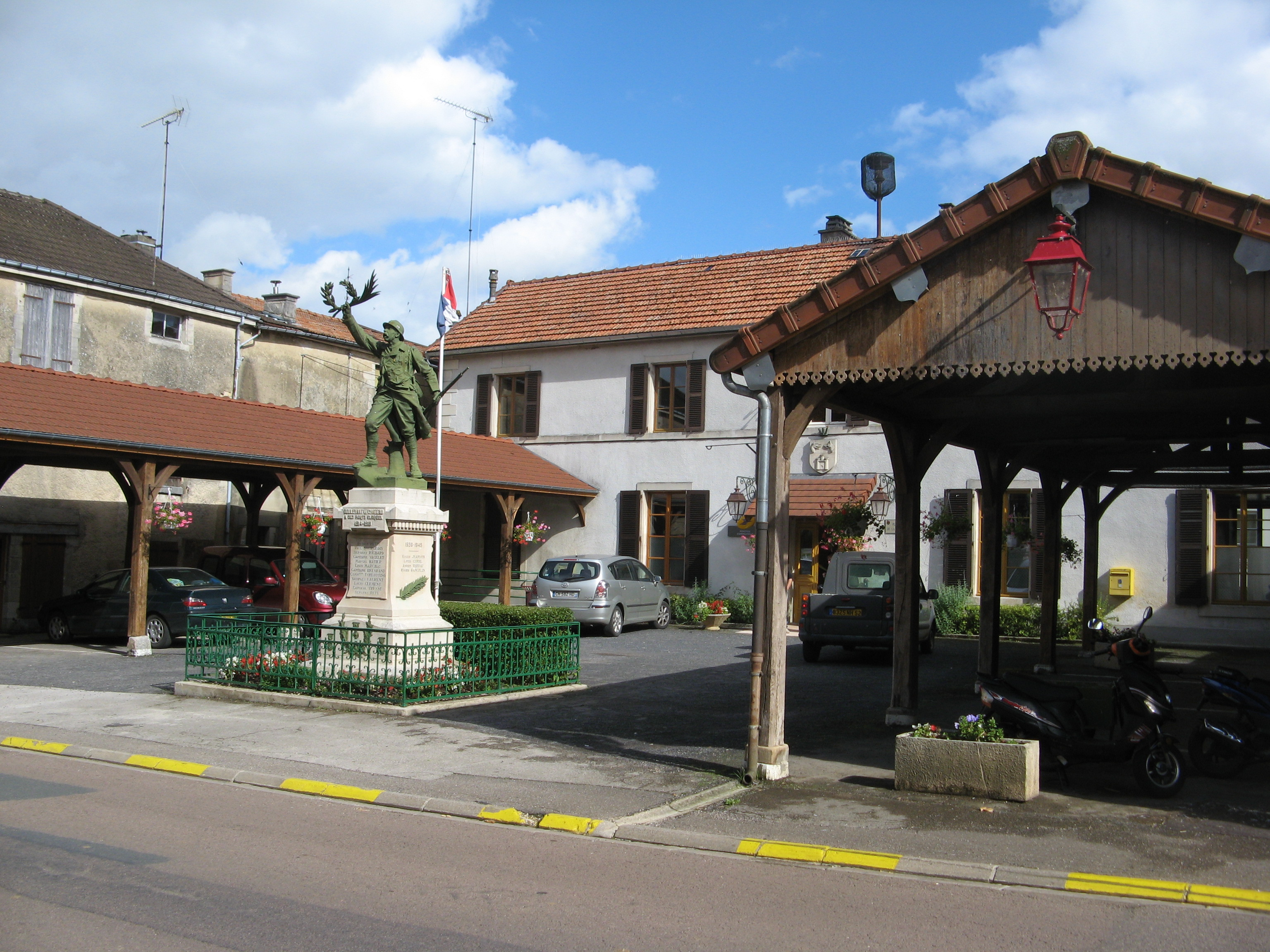
- The town hall in Doulevant-le-Château

- Coat of arms
- Location of Doulevant-le-Château
- Location within France Location within Grand Est
- Coordinates: 48°22′41″N 4°55′23″E
- Country: France
- Region: Grand Est
- Department: Haute-Marne
- Arrondissement: Saint-Dizier
- Canton: Joinville
- Intercommunality: CC Bassin de Joinville en Champagne

Government
  - Mayor (2020–2026): Virginie Asdrubal
- Area^{1}: 22.14 km^{2} (8.55 sq mi)
- Elevation: 209 m (686 ft)
- Highest elevation: 325 m (1,066 ft)
- Lowest elevation: 194 m (636 ft)
- Population (2023): 370
  - Density: 17/km^{2} (43/sq mi)
- Time zone: UTC+01:00 (CET)
  - Summer (DST): UTC+02:00 (CEST)
- INSEE/Postal code: 52178 /52110
- ^{1} French Land Register data, which excludes lakes, ponds, glaciers > 1 km^{2} (0.386 sq mi or 247 acres) and river estuaries.

Doulevant-le-Château (French pronunciation: [dulvɑ̃ lə ʃɑto], before 1992: Blaiserives) is a commune in the Haute-Marne department in north-eastern France. It was created in 1972 by the merger of two former communes: Doulevant-le-Château and Villiers-aux-Chênes.

== Geography ==
The river Blaise flows through the commune.

== See also ==
- Communes of the Haute-Marne department
