= Ambonville =

- Commune
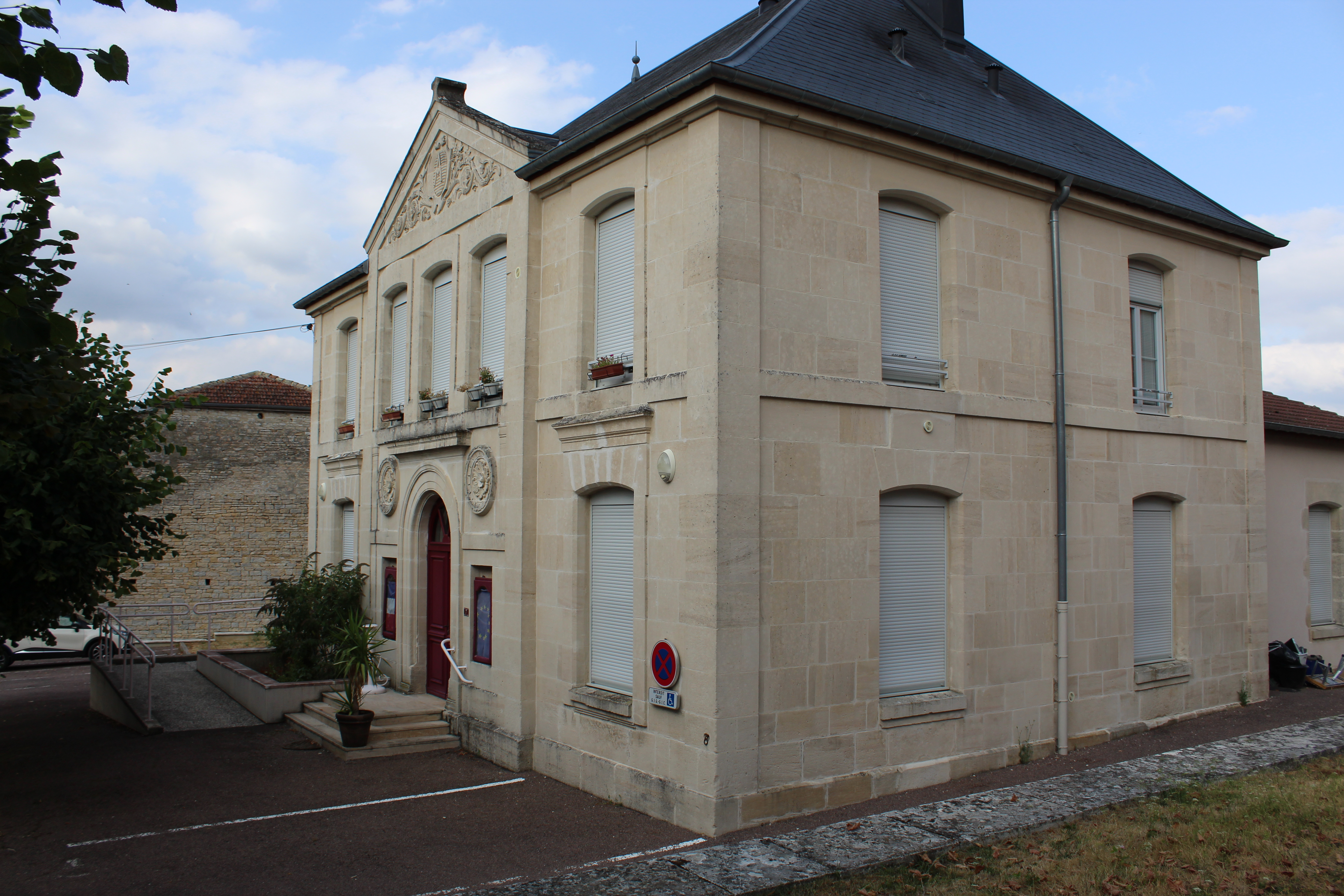
- The town hall in Ambonville
- Location of Ambonville
- Location within France Location within Grand Est
- Coordinates: 48°18′46″N 5°00′58″E
- Country: France
- Region: Grand Est
- Department: Haute-Marne
- Arrondissement: Saint-Dizier
- Canton: Joinville
- Intercommunality: Bassin de Joinville-en-Champagne

Government
  - Mayor (2020–2026): Hubert Leseur
- Area^{1}: 14.47 km^{2} (5.59 sq mi)
- Elevation: 265 m (869 ft)
- Highest elevation: 402 m (1,319 ft)
- Lowest elevation: 261 m (856 ft)
- Population (2023): 82
  - Density: 5.7/km^{2} (15/sq mi)
- Time zone: UTC+01:00 (CET)
  - Summer (DST): UTC+02:00 (CEST)
- INSEE/Postal code: 52007 /52110
- ^{1} French Land Register data, which excludes lakes, ponds, glaciers > 1 km^{2} (0.386 sq mi or 247 acres) and river estuaries.

Ambonville (French pronunciation: [ɑ̃bɔ̃vil]) is a commune in the Haute-Marne department in the Grand Est region in northeastern France.

== Population ==
Historical population
Year	Pop.	±% p.a.
1968	130	—
1975	110	−2.36%
1982	91	−2.67%
1990	81	−1.44%
1999	78	−0.42%
2007	71	−1.17%
2012	75	+1.10%
2017	82	+1.80%
2023	82	+0.00%
Source: INSEE

== See also ==
- Communes of the Haute-Marne department
