= Chatonrupt-Sommermont =

- Commune
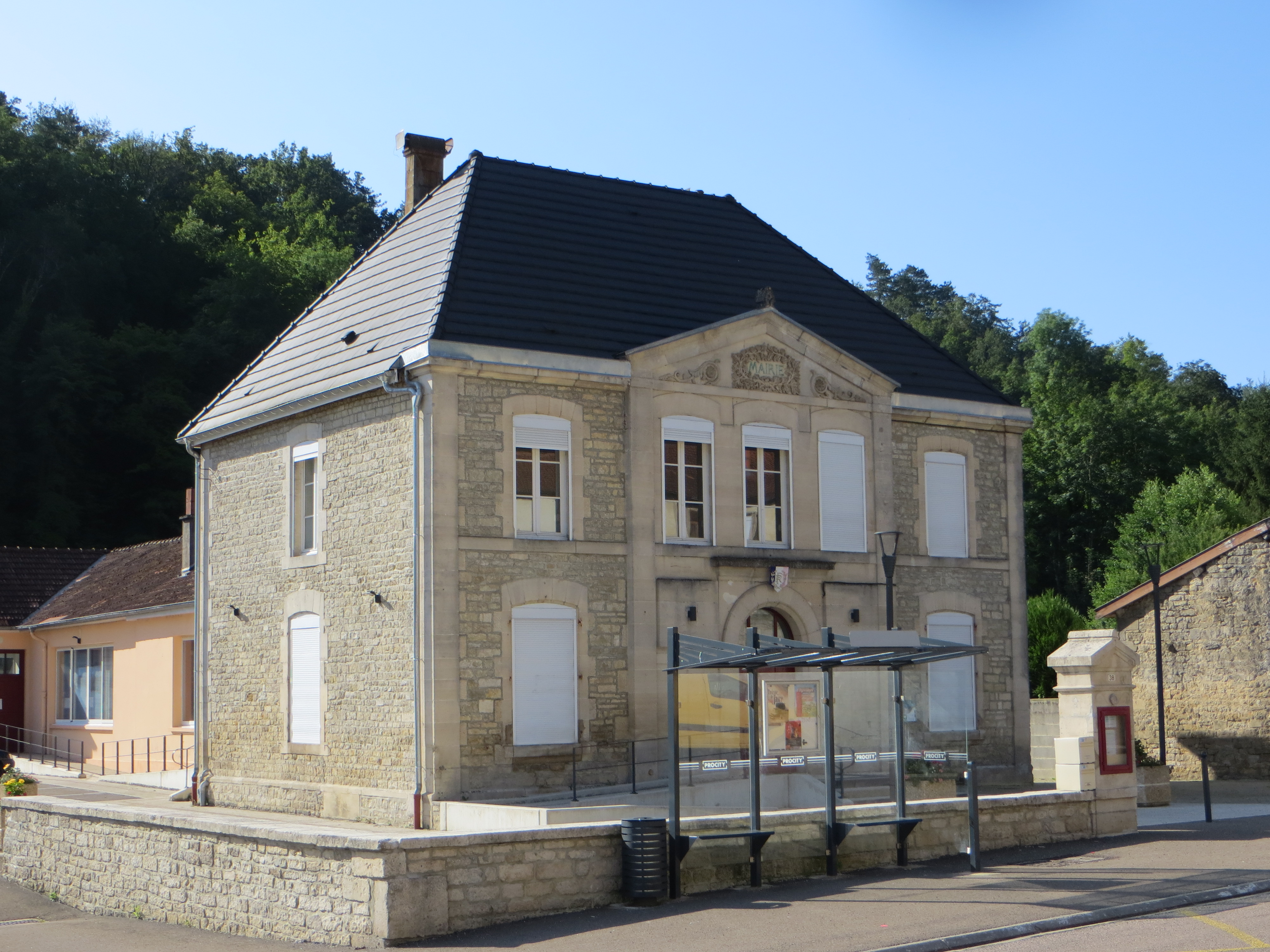
- Town hall
- Location of Chatonrupt-Sommermont
- Location within France Location within Grand Est
- Coordinates: 48°29′19″N 5°07′33″E
- Country: France
- Region: Grand Est
- Department: Haute-Marne
- Arrondissement: Saint-Dizier
- Canton: Joinville
- Intercommunality: Bassin de Joinville en Champagne

Government
  - Mayor (2020–2026): Joël Agnus
- Area^{1}: 16.66 km^{2} (6.43 sq mi)
- Elevation: 225 m (738 ft)
- Highest elevation: 315 m (1,033 ft)
- Lowest elevation: 172 m (564 ft)
- Population (2023): 268
  - Density: 16.1/km^{2} (41.7/sq mi)
- Time zone: UTC+01:00 (CET)
  - Summer (DST): UTC+02:00 (CEST)
- INSEE/Postal code: 52118 /52300
- ^{1} French Land Register data, which excludes lakes, ponds, glaciers > 1 km^{2} (0.386 sq mi or 247 acres) and river estuaries.

Chatonrupt-Sommermont (French pronunciation: [ʃatɔ̃ʁy sɔmɛʁmɔ̃]) is a commune in the Haute-Marne department in north-eastern France. It was created in 1972 by the merger of two former communes: Sommermont and Chatonrupt.

== See also ==
- Communes of the Haute-Marne department
