= Bouzancourt =

- Commune
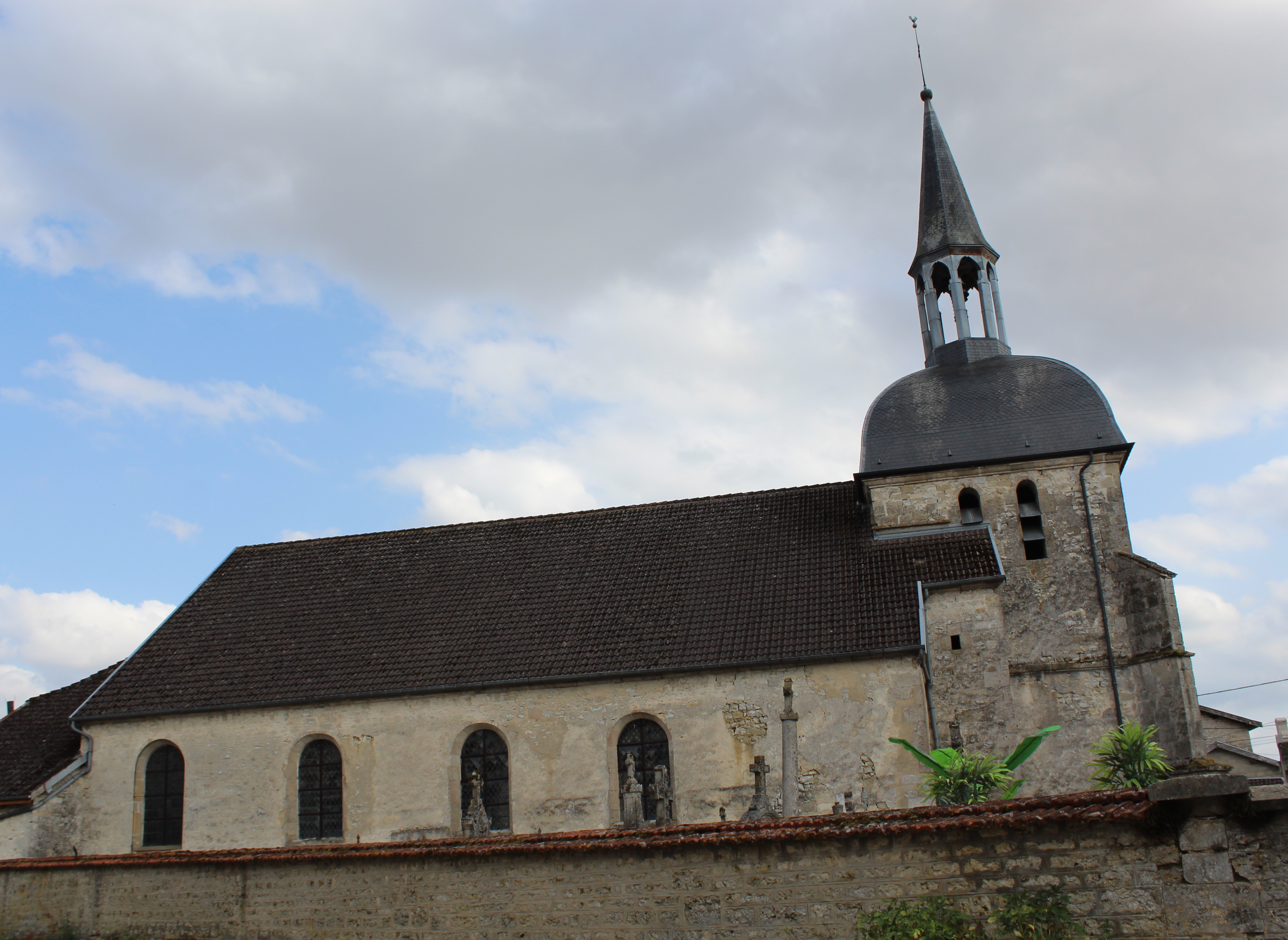
- The church in Bouzancourt
- Location of Bouzancourt
- Location within France Location within Grand Est
- Coordinates: 48°18′54″N 4°57′01″E
- Country: France
- Region: Grand Est
- Department: Haute-Marne
- Arrondissement: Saint-Dizier
- Canton: Joinville

Government
  - Mayor (2020–2026): Franck Thieblemont
- Area^{1}: 11.75 km^{2} (4.54 sq mi)
- Elevation: 235 m (771 ft)
- Highest elevation: 381 m (1,250 ft)
- Lowest elevation: 227 m (745 ft)
- Population (2023): 72
  - Density: 6.1/km^{2} (16/sq mi)
- Time zone: UTC+01:00 (CET)
  - Summer (DST): UTC+02:00 (CEST)
- INSEE/Postal code: 52065 /52110
- ^{1} French Land Register data, which excludes lakes, ponds, glaciers > 1 km^{2} (0.386 sq mi or 247 acres) and river estuaries.

Bouzancourt (French pronunciation: [buzɑ̃kuʁ]) is a commune in the Haute-Marne department in northeastern France.

== Geography ==
The river Blaise flows through the commune.

== Population ==
Historical population
Year	Pop.	±% p.a.
1968	100	—
1975	81	−2.97%
1982	55	−5.38%
1990	69	+2.88%
1999	71	+0.32%
2007	62	−1.68%
2012	72	+3.04%
2017	65	−2.02%
2023	72	+1.72%
Source: INSEE

== See also ==
- Communes of the Haute-Marne department
