= Vecqueville =

- Commune
- Location of Vecqueville
- Location within France Location within Grand Est
- Coordinates: 48°27′33″N 5°08′29″E
- Country: France
- Region: Grand Est
- Department: Haute-Marne
- Arrondissement: Saint-Dizier
- Canton: Joinville
- Intercommunality: Bassin de Joinville en Champagne

Government
  - Mayor (2020–2026): Franscisco Albarras
- Area^{1}: 5.22 km^{2} (2.02 sq mi)
- Elevation: 185 m (607 ft)
- Highest elevation: 334 m (1,096 ft)
- Lowest elevation: 175 m (574 ft)
- Population (2023): 502
  - Density: 96.2/km^{2} (249/sq mi)
- Time zone: UTC+01:00 (CET)
  - Summer (DST): UTC+02:00 (CEST)
- INSEE/Postal code: 52512 /52300
- ^{1} French Land Register data, which excludes lakes, ponds, glaciers > 1 km^{2} (0.386 sq mi or 247 acres) and river estuaries.

Vecqueville (French pronunciation: [vɛkvil]) is a commune in the Haute-Marne department in north-eastern France.

== See also ==
- Communes of the Haute-Marne department
