= Beurville =

- Commune
- Coat of arms
- Location of Beurville
- Location within France Location within Grand Est
- Coordinates: 48°19′11″N 4°50′03″E
- Country: France
- Region: Grand Est
- Department: Haute-Marne
- Arrondissement: Saint-Dizier
- Canton: Joinville

Government
  - Mayor (2020–2026): Laurent Lallement
- Area^{1}: 22.92 km^{2} (8.85 sq mi)
- Elevation: 213 m (699 ft)
- Highest elevation: 336 m (1,102 ft)
- Lowest elevation: 200 m (660 ft)
- Population (2023): 102
  - Density: 4.45/km^{2} (11.5/sq mi)
- Time zone: UTC+01:00 (CET)
  - Summer (DST): UTC+02:00 (CEST)
- INSEE/Postal code: 52047 /52110
- ^{1} French Land Register data, which excludes lakes, ponds, glaciers > 1 km^{2} (0.386 sq mi or 247 acres) and river estuaries.

Beurville (French pronunciation: [bœʁvil]) is a commune in the Haute-Marne department in northeastern France.

== Population ==
Historical population
Year	Pop.	±% p.a.
1968	182	—
1975	175	−0.56%
1982	150	−2.18%
1990	138	−1.04%
1999	111	−2.39%
2007	106	−0.57%
2012	103	−0.57%
2017	104	+0.19%
2023	102	−0.32%
Source: INSEE

== See also ==
- Communes of the Haute-Marne department
