= Mertrud =

- Commune
- Location of Mertrud
- Location within France Location within Grand Est
- Coordinates: 48°25′19″N 4°53′25″E
- Country: France
- Region: Grand Est
- Department: Haute-Marne
- Arrondissement: Saint-Dizier
- Canton: Joinville
- Intercommunality: CC Bassin de Joinville en Champagne

Government
  - Mayor (2020–2026): Daniel Friquet
- Area^{1}: 12.06 km^{2} (4.66 sq mi)
- Elevation: 181 m (594 ft)
- Highest elevation: 216 m (709 ft)
- Lowest elevation: 152 m (499 ft)
- Population (2023): 183
  - Density: 15.2/km^{2} (39.3/sq mi)
- Time zone: UTC+01:00 (CET)
  - Summer (DST): UTC+02:00 (CEST)
- INSEE/Postal code: 52321 /52110
- ^{1} French Land Register data, which excludes lakes, ponds, glaciers > 1 km^{2} (0.386 sq mi or 247 acres) and river estuaries.

Mertrud (French pronunciation: [mɛʁtʁy]) is a commune in the Haute-Marne department in north-eastern France.

== See also ==
- Communes of the Haute-Marne department
