= Donjeux =

Donjeux may refer to the following places in France:

- Donjeux, Haute-Marne, a commune in the Haute-Marne department
- Donjeux, Moselle, a commune in the Moselle department
