= Flammerécourt =

- Commune
- Location of Flammerécourt
- Location within France Location within Grand Est
- Coordinates: 48°21′47″N 5°02′31″E
- Country: France
- Region: Grand Est
- Department: Haute-Marne
- Arrondissement: Saint-Dizier
- Canton: Joinville
- Intercommunality: CC Bassin de Joinville en Champagne

Government
  - Mayor (2020–2026): Jean-Marc Fèvre
- Area^{1}: 10.52 km^{2} (4.06 sq mi)
- Elevation: 242 m (794 ft)
- Highest elevation: 385 m (1,263 ft)
- Lowest elevation: 238 m (781 ft)
- Population (2023): 72
  - Density: 6.8/km^{2} (18/sq mi)
- Time zone: UTC+01:00 (CET)
  - Summer (DST): UTC+02:00 (CEST)
- INSEE/Postal code: 52201 /52110
- ^{1} French Land Register data, which excludes lakes, ponds, glaciers > 1 km^{2} (0.386 sq mi or 247 acres) and river estuaries.

Flammerécourt (French pronunciation: [flamʁekuʁ]) is a commune in the Haute-Marne department in north-eastern France.

== See also ==
- Communes of the Haute-Marne department
