= Autigny-le-Grand =

- Commune
- Location of Autigny-le-Grand
- Location within France Location within Grand Est
- Coordinates: 48°28′27″N 5°08′11″E
- Country: France
- Region: Grand Est
- Department: Haute-Marne
- Arrondissement: Saint-Dizier
- Canton: Joinville
- Intercommunality: CC Bassin Joinville Champagne

Government
  - Mayor (2020–2026): Pascal Rossignon
- Area^{1}: 3.59 km^{2} (1.39 sq mi)
- Elevation: 179 m (587 ft)
- Highest elevation: 326 m (1,070 ft)
- Lowest elevation: 172 m (564 ft)
- Population (2023): 130
  - Density: 36/km^{2} (94/sq mi)
- Time zone: UTC+01:00 (CET)
  - Summer (DST): UTC+02:00 (CEST)
- INSEE/Postal code: 52029 /52300
- ^{1} French Land Register data, which excludes lakes, ponds, glaciers > 1 km^{2} (0.386 sq mi or 247 acres) and river estuaries.

Autigny-le-Grand (French pronunciation: [otiɲi lə ɡʁɑ̃]) is a commune in the Haute-Marne department in the Grand Est region in northeastern France.

== Population ==
Historical population
Year	Pop.	±% p.a.
1968	297	—
1975	242	−2.88%
1982	230	−0.72%
1990	220	−0.55%
1999	210	−0.52%
2007	170	−2.61%
2012	159	−1.33%
2017	149	−1.29%
2023	130	−2.25%
Source: INSEE

== See also ==
- Communes of the Haute-Marne department
