= Mathons =

- Commune
- Location of Mathons
- Location within France Location within Grand Est
- Coordinates: 48°25′09″N 5°02′41″E
- Country: France
- Region: Grand Est
- Department: Haute-Marne
- Arrondissement: Saint-Dizier
- Canton: Joinville
- Intercommunality: Bassin de Joinville en Champagne

Government
  - Mayor (2020–2026): Laure Plantegenet
- Area^{1}: 13.4 km^{2} (5.2 sq mi)
- Elevation: 308 m (1,010 ft)
- Highest elevation: 349 m (1,145 ft)
- Lowest elevation: 242 m (794 ft)
- Population (2023): 68
  - Density: 5.1/km^{2} (13/sq mi)
- Demonym(s): Mathonais, Mathonaises
- Time zone: UTC+01:00 (CET)
  - Summer (DST): UTC+02:00 (CEST)
- INSEE/Postal code: 52316 /52300
- Website: Site de la ville
- ^{1} French Land Register data, which excludes lakes, ponds, glaciers > 1 km^{2} (0.386 sq mi or 247 acres) and river estuaries.

Mathons (French pronunciation: [matɔ̃]) is a commune in the Haute-Marne department in north-eastern France.

== See also ==
- Communes of the Haute-Marne department
