= Thonnance-lès-Joinville =

- Commune
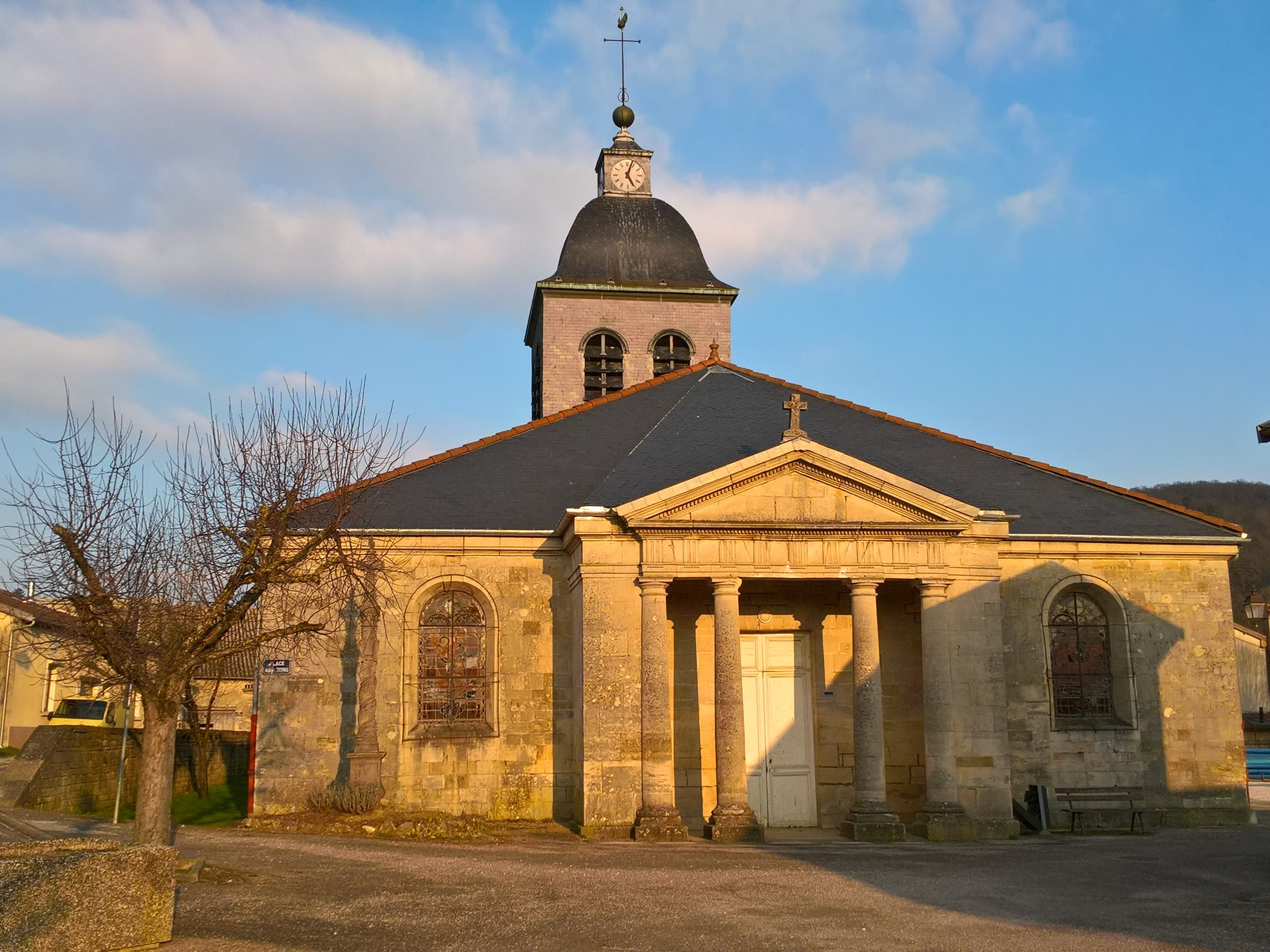
- The church in Thonnance-lès-Joinville

- Coat of arms
- Location of Thonnance-lès-Joinville
- Location within France Location within Grand Est
- Coordinates: 48°27′19″N 5°10′22″E
- Country: France
- Region: Grand Est
- Department: Haute-Marne
- Arrondissement: Saint-Dizier
- Canton: Joinville
- Intercommunality: Bassin de Joinville en Champagne

Government
  - Mayor (2020–2026): Alain Malingrey
- Area^{1}: 11.33 km^{2} (4.37 sq mi)
- Elevation: 192 m (630 ft)
- Highest elevation: 365 m (1,198 ft)
- Lowest elevation: 180 m (590 ft)
- Population (2023): 720
  - Density: 64/km^{2} (160/sq mi)
- Time zone: UTC+01:00 (CET)
  - Summer (DST): UTC+02:00 (CEST)
- INSEE/Postal code: 52490 /52300
- ^{1} French Land Register data, which excludes lakes, ponds, glaciers > 1 km^{2} (0.386 sq mi or 247 acres) and river estuaries.

Thonnance-lès-Joinville (French pronunciation: [tɔnɑ̃s lɛ ʒwɛ̃vil], literally Thonnance near Joinville) is a commune in the Haute-Marne department in north-eastern France.

== In literature ==
In Ken Follett's historical novel A Column of Fire, 16th century Thonnance-lès-Joinville is the birthplace of the character Pierre Aumande, depicted as having been born there as the bastard son of a parish priest and in later life trying to escape this humble origin and forge for himself a position at the Royal Court in Paris.

== See also ==
- Communes of the Haute-Marne department
