= Brachay =

- Commune
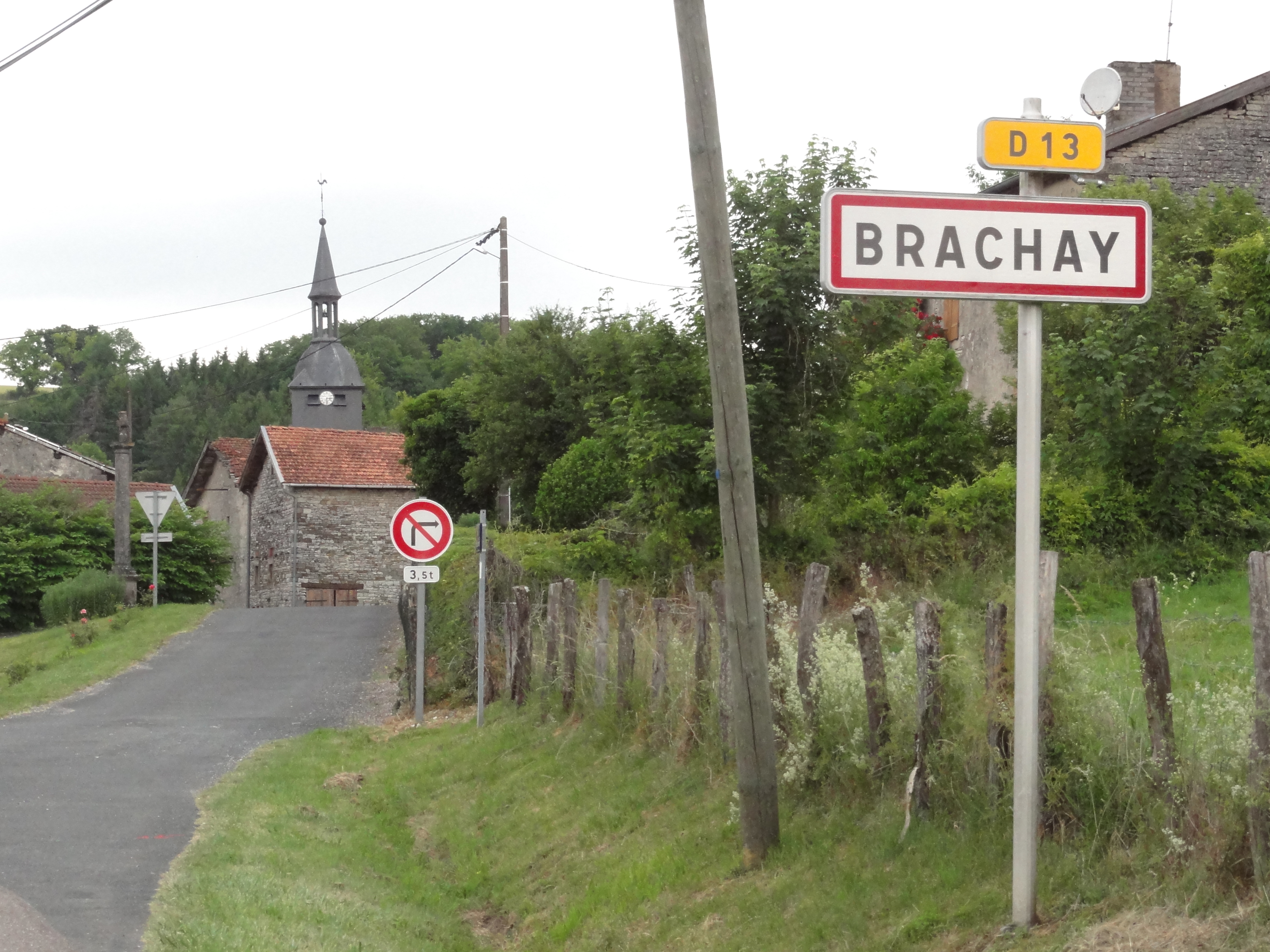
- The road into Brachay
- Location of Brachay
- Location within France Location within Grand Est
- Coordinates: 48°22′37″N 5°01′44″E
- Country: France
- Region: Grand Est
- Department: Haute-Marne
- Arrondissement: Saint-Dizier
- Canton: Joinville

Government
  - Mayor (2020–2026): Gérard Marchand
- Area^{1}: 7.4 km^{2} (2.9 sq mi)
- Elevation: 240 m (790 ft)
- Highest elevation: 339 m (1,112 ft)
- Lowest elevation: 225 m (738 ft)
- Population (2023): 58
  - Density: 7.8/km^{2} (20/sq mi)
- Time zone: UTC+01:00 (CET)
  - Summer (DST): UTC+02:00 (CEST)
- INSEE/Postal code: 52066 /52110
- ^{1} French Land Register data, which excludes lakes, ponds, glaciers > 1 km^{2} (0.386 sq mi or 247 acres) and river estuaries.

Brachay (French pronunciation: [bʁaʃɛ]) is a commune in the Haute-Marne department in northeastern France.

== Population ==
Historical population
Year	Pop.	±% p.a.
1968	152	—
1975	130	−2.21%
1982	77	−7.21%
1990	74	−0.50%
1999	62	−1.95%
2007	60	−0.41%
2012	57	−1.02%
2017	61	+1.37%
2023	58	−0.84%
Source: INSEE

== See also ==
- Communes of the Haute-Marne department
