= Noncourt-sur-le-Rongeant =

- Commune
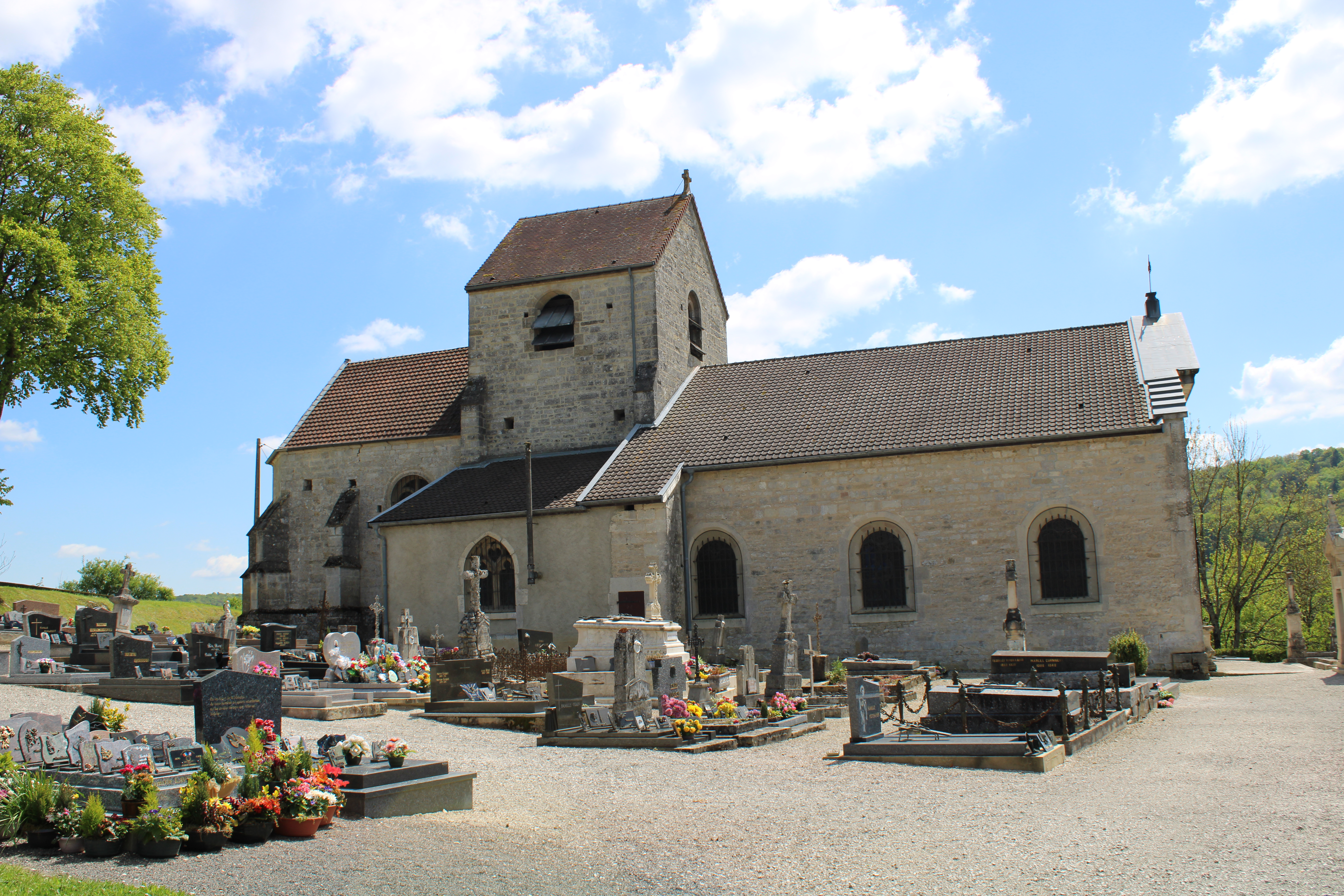
- The church in Noncourt-sur-le-Rongeant
- Location of Noncourt-sur-le-Rongeant
- Location within France Location within Grand Est
- Coordinates: 48°25′13″N 5°14′38″E
- Country: France
- Region: Grand Est
- Department: Haute-Marne
- Arrondissement: Saint-Dizier
- Canton: Poissons
- Intercommunality: Bassin de Joinville en Champagne

Government
  - Mayor (2020–2026): Mickaël Boudinet
- Area^{1}: 9.31 km^{2} (3.59 sq mi)
- Elevation: 234 m (768 ft)
- Highest elevation: 394 m (1,293 ft)
- Lowest elevation: 221 m (725 ft)
- Population (2023): 168
  - Density: 18.0/km^{2} (46.7/sq mi)
- Time zone: UTC+01:00 (CET)
  - Summer (DST): UTC+02:00 (CEST)
- INSEE/Postal code: 52357 /52230
- ^{1} French Land Register data, which excludes lakes, ponds, glaciers > 1 km^{2} (0.386 sq mi or 247 acres) and river estuaries.

Noncourt-sur-le-Rongeant (French pronunciation: [nɔ̃kuʁ syʁ lə ʁɔ̃ʒɑ̃]) is a commune in the Haute-Marne department in north-eastern France.

== See also ==
- Communes of the Haute-Marne department
