= Donjeux, Haute-Marne =

Donjeux
- Commune
- Coat of arms
- Location of Donjeux
- Location within France Location within Grand Est
- Coordinates: 48°21′53″N 5°09′22″E
- Country: France
- Region: Grand Est
- Department: Haute-Marne
- Arrondissement: Saint-Dizier
- Canton: Joinville
- Intercommunality: Bassin de Joinville en Champagne

Government
  - Mayor (2020–2026): Yves Chauvelot
- Area^{1}: 12.84 km^{2} (4.96 sq mi)
- Elevation: 216 m (709 ft)
- Highest elevation: 322 m (1,056 ft)
- Lowest elevation: 194 m (636 ft)
- Population (2023): 380
  - Density: 30/km^{2} (77/sq mi)
- Time zone: UTC+01:00 (CET)
  - Summer (DST): UTC+02:00 (CEST)
- INSEE/Postal code: 52175 /52300
- ^{1} French Land Register data, which excludes lakes, ponds, glaciers > 1 km^{2} (0.386 sq mi or 247 acres) and river estuaries.

Donjeux (French pronunciation: [dɔ̃ʒø]) is a commune in the Haute-Marne department in north-eastern France.

== See also ==
- Communes of the Haute-Marne department
