= Leschères-sur-le-Blaiseron =

- Commune
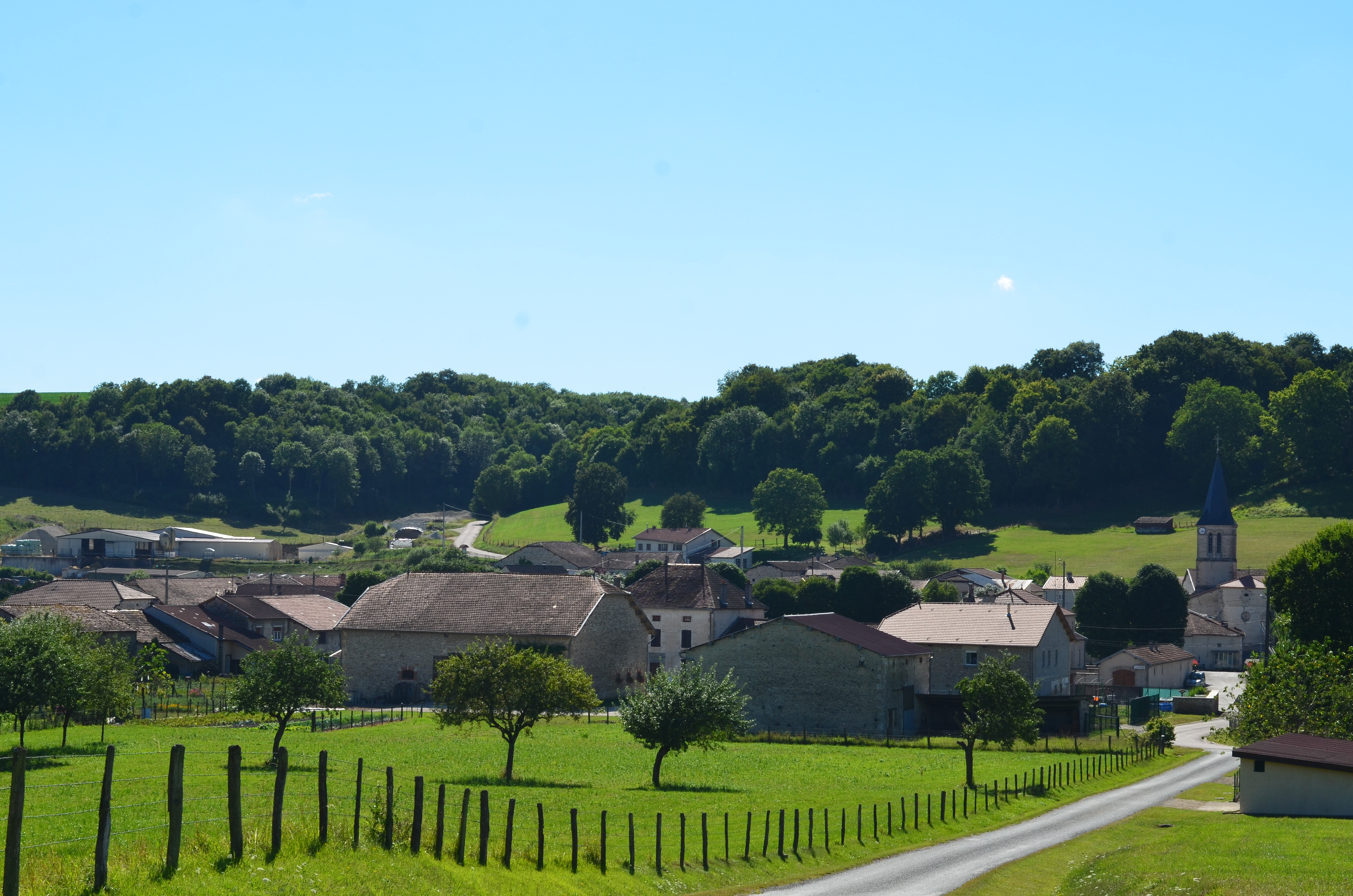
- A general view of Leschères-sur-le-Blaiseron
- Location of Leschères-sur-le-Blaiseron
- Location within France Location within Grand Est
- Coordinates: 48°20′16″N 5°02′23″E
- Country: France
- Region: Grand Est
- Department: Haute-Marne
- Arrondissement: Saint-Dizier
- Canton: Joinville
- Intercommunality: CC Bassin de Joinville en Champagne

Government
  - Mayor (2020–2026): Christophe Thieblemont
- Area^{1}: 14.93 km^{2} (5.76 sq mi)
- Elevation: 250 m (820 ft)
- Highest elevation: 388 m (1,273 ft)
- Lowest elevation: 246 m (807 ft)
- Population (2023): 87
  - Density: 5.8/km^{2} (15/sq mi)
- Time zone: UTC+01:00 (CET)
  - Summer (DST): UTC+02:00 (CEST)
- INSEE/Postal code: 52284 /52110
- ^{1} French Land Register data, which excludes lakes, ponds, glaciers > 1 km^{2} (0.386 sq mi or 247 acres) and river estuaries.

Leschères-sur-le-Blaiseron (French pronunciation: [leʃɛʁ syʁ lə blɛzʁɔ̃]) is a commune in the Haute-Marne department in north-eastern France.

== See also ==
- Communes of the Haute-Marne department
