= Fronville =

Commune in Haute-Marne, France

- Commune
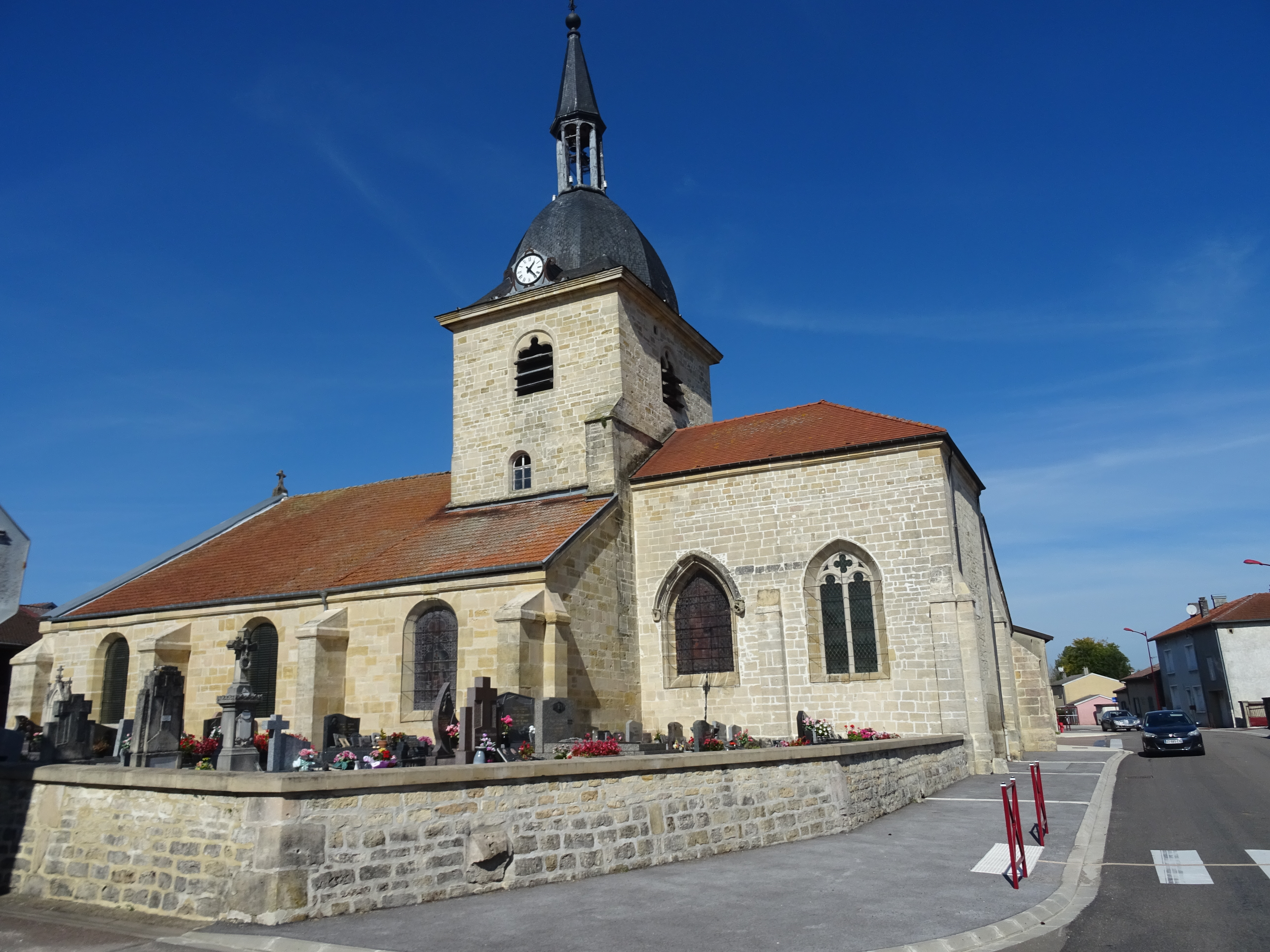
- Saint-Lumier Church, Fronville (2021)
- Location of Fronville
- Location within France Location within Grand Est
- Coordinates: 48°24′16″N 5°09′12″E
- Country: France
- Region: Grand Est
- Department: Haute-Marne
- Arrondissement: Saint-Dizier
- Canton: Joinville
- Intercommunality: Bassin de Joinville en Champagne

Government
  - Mayor (2020–2026): Bruno Tonon
- Area^{1}: 11.08 km^{2} (4.28 sq mi)
- Elevation: 193 m (633 ft)
- Highest elevation: 363 m (1,191 ft)
- Lowest elevation: 187 m (614 ft)
- Population (2023): 296
  - Density: 26.7/km^{2} (69.2/sq mi)
- Demonym(s): Fronvillois, Fronvilloises
- Time zone: UTC+01:00 (CET)
  - Summer (DST): UTC+02:00 (CEST)
- INSEE/Postal code: 52212 /52300
- ^{1} French Land Register data, which excludes lakes, ponds, glaciers > 1 km^{2} (0.386 sq mi or 247 acres) and river estuaries.

Fronville (French pronunciation: [fʁɔ̃vil]) is a commune in the Haute-Marne department in north-eastern France.

== See also ==
- Communes of the Haute-Marne department
