= Dommartin-le-Saint-Père =

- Commune
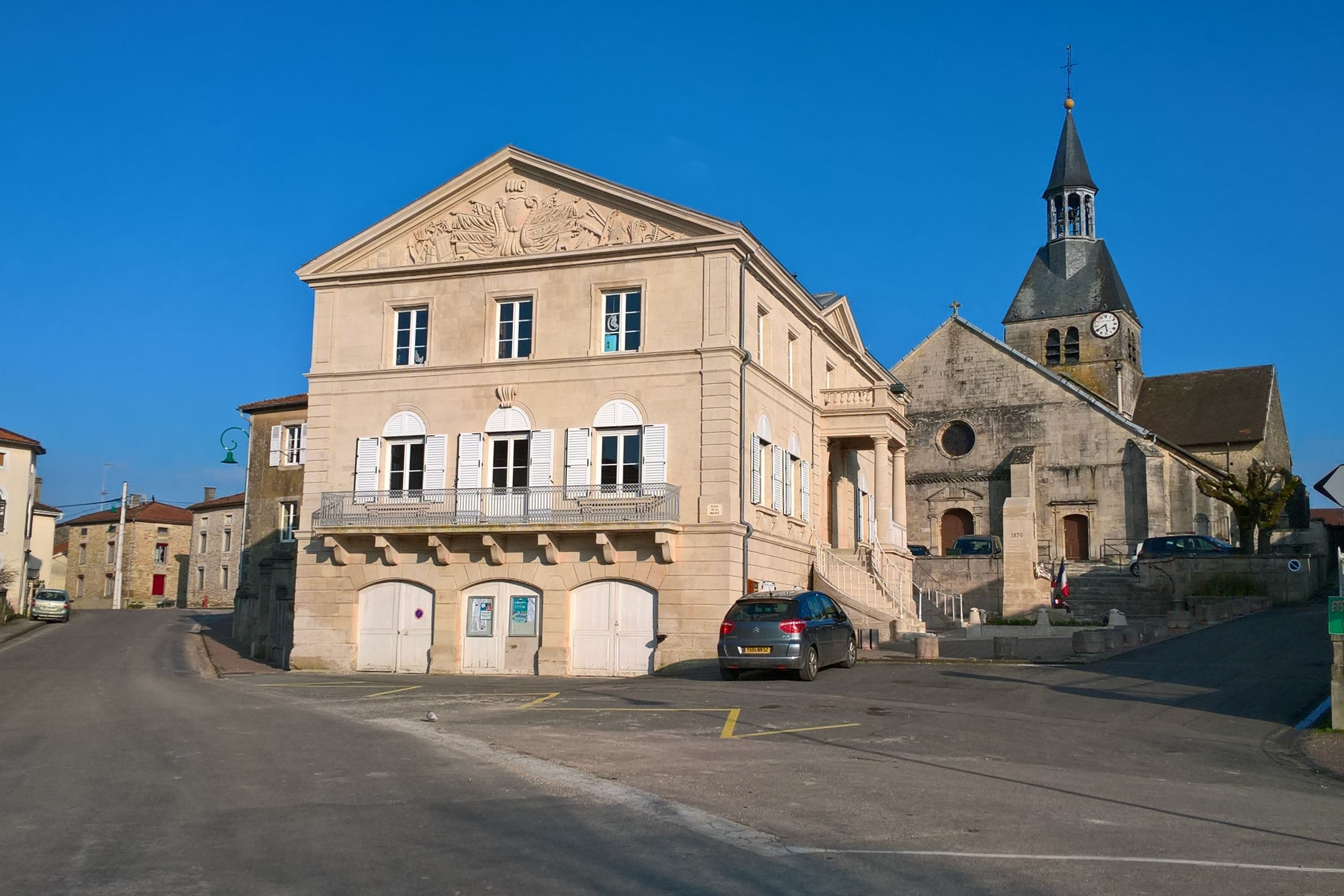
- The town hall and church in Dommartin-le-Saint-Père
- Location of Dommartin-le-Saint-Père
- Location within France Location within Grand Est
- Coordinates: 48°23′42″N 4°55′21″E
- Country: France
- Region: Grand Est
- Department: Haute-Marne
- Arrondissement: Saint-Dizier
- Canton: Joinville
- Intercommunality: CC Bassin de Joinville en Champagne

Government
  - Mayor (2020–2026): Osmane Leseur
- Area^{1}: 14.88 km^{2} (5.75 sq mi)
- Elevation: 203 m (666 ft)
- Highest elevation: 274 m (899 ft)
- Lowest elevation: 172 m (564 ft)
- Population (2023): 265
  - Density: 17.8/km^{2} (46.1/sq mi)
- Time zone: UTC+01:00 (CET)
  - Summer (DST): UTC+02:00 (CEST)
- INSEE/Postal code: 52172 /52110
- ^{1} French Land Register data, which excludes lakes, ponds, glaciers > 1 km^{2} (0.386 sq mi or 247 acres) and river estuaries.

Dommartin-le-Saint-Père (French pronunciation: [dɔmaʁtɛ̃ lə sɛ̃ pɛʁ]) is a commune in the Haute-Marne department in north-eastern France.

== Geography ==
The river Blaise flows through the commune.

== Demography ==
Historical population
Year	Pop.	±% p.a.
1968	427	—
1975	381	−1.62%
1982	337	−1.74%
1990	298	−1.53%
1999	275	−0.89%
2007	280	+0.23%
2012	280	+0.00%
2017	276	−0.29%
2023	265	−0.68%
Source: INSEE

== See also ==
- Communes of the Haute-Marne department
