= Canton of Joinville =

Canton of France

Coordinates: 48.44°N 5.14°E

The canton of Joinville is an administrative division of the Haute-Marne department, northeastern France. Its borders were modified at the French canton reorganisation which came into effect in March 2015. Its seat is in Joinville.

It consists of the following communes:

1. Ambonville
2. Arnancourt
3. Autigny-le-Grand
4. Autigny-le-Petit
5. Baudrecourt
6. Beurville
7. Blécourt
8. Blumeray
9. Bouzancourt
10. Brachay
11. Charmes-en-l'Angle
12. Charmes-la-Grande
13. Chatonrupt-Sommermont
14. Cirey-sur-Blaise
15. Courcelles-sur-Blaise
16. Dommartin-le-Saint-Père
17. Donjeux
18. Doulevant-le-Château
19. Ferrière-et-Lafolie
20. Flammerécourt
21. Fronville
22. Gudmont-Villiers
23. Guindrecourt-aux-Ormes
24. Joinville
25. Leschères-sur-le-Blaiseron
26. Mathons
27. Mertrud
28. Mussey-sur-Marne
29. Nomécourt
30. Nully
31. Rouvroy-sur-Marne
32. Rupt
33. Saint-Urbain-Maconcourt
34. Suzannecourt
35. Thonnance-lès-Joinville
36. Trémilly
37. Vaux-sur-Saint-Urbain
38. Vecqueville
