= Domremy-Landéville =

- Commune
- Location of Domremy-Landéville
- Location within France Location within Grand Est
- Coordinates: 48°21′41″N 5°15′05″E
- Country: France
- Region: Grand Est
- Department: Haute-Marne
- Arrondissement: Saint-Dizier
- Canton: Bologne
- Intercommunality: Meuse Rognon

Government
  - Mayor (2023–2026): Hugues Massaux
- Area^{1}: 18.64 km^{2} (7.20 sq mi)
- Elevation: 328 m (1,076 ft)
- Highest elevation: 368 m (1,207 ft)
- Lowest elevation: 242 m (794 ft)
- Population (2023): 75
  - Density: 4.0/km^{2} (10/sq mi)
- Time zone: UTC+01:00 (CET)
  - Summer (DST): UTC+02:00 (CEST)
- INSEE/Postal code: 52173 /52270
- ^{1} French Land Register data, which excludes lakes, ponds, glaciers > 1 km^{2} (0.386 sq mi or 247 acres) and river estuaries.

Domremy-Landéville (French pronunciation: [dɔ̃ʁemi lɑ̃devil]) is a commune in the Haute-Marne department in north-eastern France. The commune was formed in 1973 by the merger of the former communes Landéville and Domremy-en-Ornois.

== See also ==
- Communes of the Haute-Marne department
