= Baudrecourt, Haute-Marne =

Baudrecourt
- Commune
- Location of Baudrecourt
- Location within France Location within Grand Est
- Coordinates: 48°23′46″N 4°57′47″E
- Country: France
- Region: Grand Est
- Department: Haute-Marne
- Arrondissement: Saint-Dizier
- Canton: Joinville

Government
  - Mayor (2020–2026): Éric Cuny
- Area^{1}: 8.78 km^{2} (3.39 sq mi)
- Elevation: 210 m (690 ft)
- Highest elevation: 291 m (955 ft)
- Lowest elevation: 195 m (640 ft)
- Population (2023): 84
  - Density: 9.6/km^{2} (25/sq mi)
- Time zone: UTC+01:00 (CET)
  - Summer (DST): UTC+02:00 (CEST)
- INSEE/Postal code: 52039 /52110
- ^{1} French Land Register data, which excludes lakes, ponds, glaciers > 1 km^{2} (0.386 sq mi or 247 acres) and river estuaries.

Baudrecourt (French pronunciation: [bodʁəkuʁ]) is a commune in the Haute-Marne department in the Grand Est region in northeastern France.

== Population ==
Historical population
Year	Pop.	±% p.a.
1968	161	—
1975	134	−2.59%
1982	116	−2.04%
1990	114	−0.22%
1999	105	−0.91%
2007	124	+2.10%
2012	105	−3.27%
2017	92	−2.61%
2023	84	−1.50%
Source: INSEE

== See also ==
- Communes of the Haute-Marne department
