= Arnancourt =

- Commune
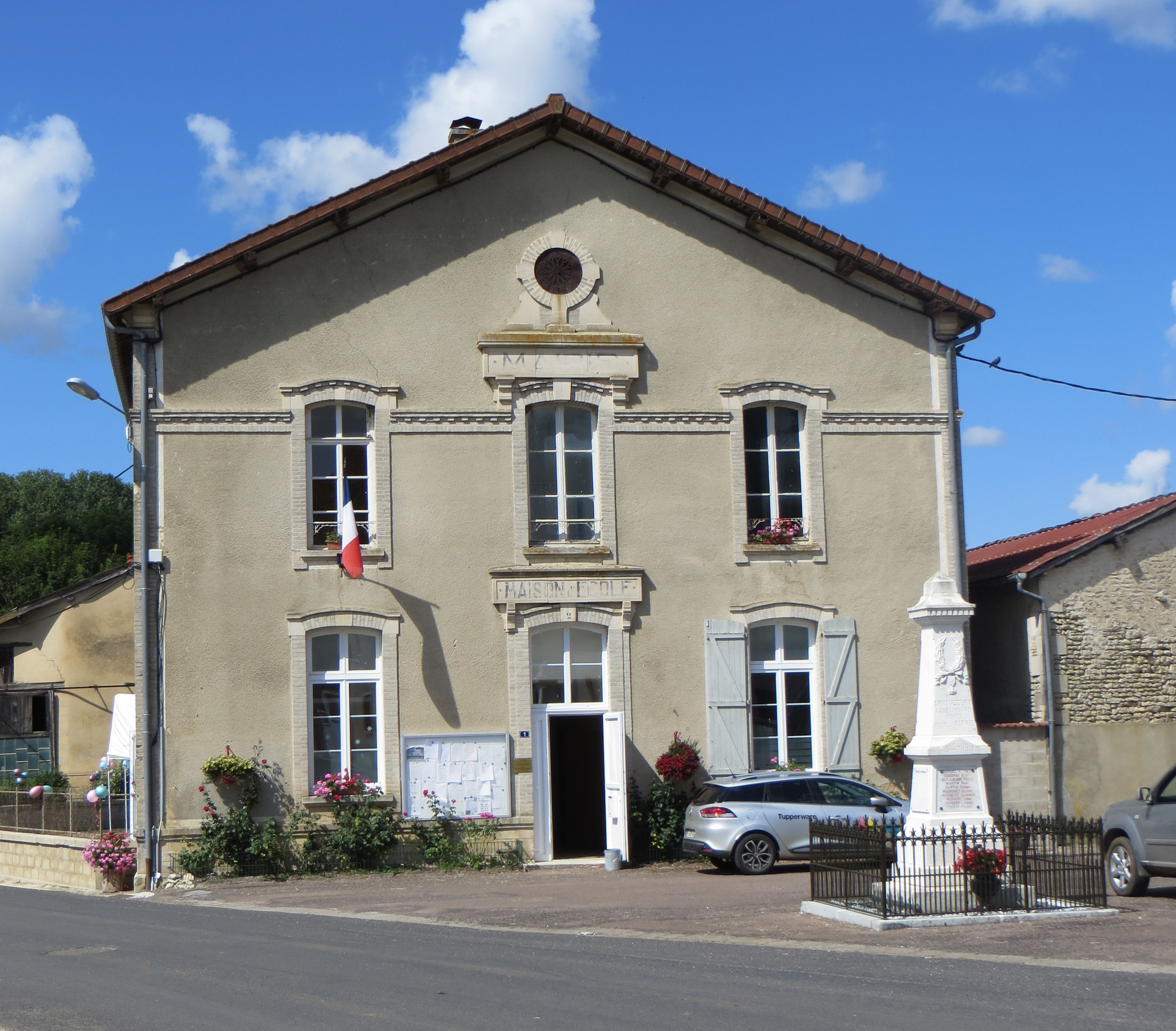
- Town hall

- Coat of arms
- Location of Arnancourt
- Location within France Location within Grand Est
- Coordinates: 48°21′11″N 4°55′18″E
- Country: France
- Region: Grand Est
- Department: Haute-Marne
- Arrondissement: Saint-Dizier
- Canton: Joinville
- Intercommunality: CC Bassin Joinville Champagne

Government
  - Mayor (2020–2026): Aude Chatelain-Martini
- Area^{1}: 9.31 km^{2} (3.59 sq mi)
- Elevation: 216 m (709 ft)
- Highest elevation: 315 m (1,033 ft)
- Lowest elevation: 209 m (686 ft)
- Population (2023): 78
  - Density: 8.4/km^{2} (22/sq mi)
- Time zone: UTC+01:00 (CET)
  - Summer (DST): UTC+02:00 (CEST)
- INSEE/Postal code: 52019 /52110
- ^{1} French Land Register data, which excludes lakes, ponds, glaciers > 1 km^{2} (0.386 sq mi or 247 acres) and river estuaries.

Arnancourt is a commune in the Haute-Marne department in the Grand Est region in northeastern France.

== Geography ==
The river Blaise flows through the commune.

== Population ==
Historical population
Year	Pop.	±% p.a.
1968	174	—
1975	143	−2.76%
1982	127	−1.68%
1990	133	+0.58%
1999	128	−0.42%
2007	113	−1.55%
2012	99	−2.61%
2017	91	−1.67%
2023	78	−2.54%
Source: INSEE

== See also ==
- Communes of the Haute-Marne department
