= Annonville =

- Commune
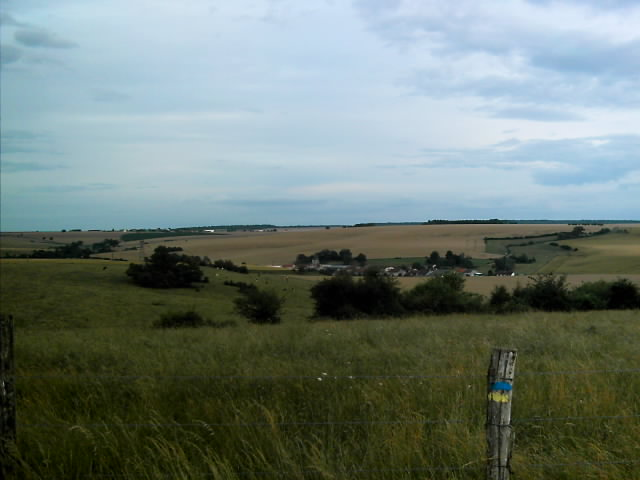
- A general view of Annonville
- Location of Annonville
- Location within France Location within Grand Est
- Coordinates: 48°23′05″N 5°16′14″E
- Country: France
- Region: Grand Est
- Department: Haute-Marne
- Arrondissement: Saint-Dizier
- Canton: Poissons

Government
  - Mayor (2020–2026): Stéphanie Robert
- Area^{1}: 6.19 km^{2} (2.39 sq mi)
- Elevation: 285 m (935 ft)
- Highest elevation: 353 m (1,158 ft)
- Lowest elevation: 263 m (863 ft)
- Population (2023): 28
  - Density: 4.5/km^{2} (12/sq mi)
- Time zone: UTC+01:00 (CET)
  - Summer (DST): UTC+02:00 (CEST)
- INSEE/Postal code: 52012 /52230
- ^{1} French Land Register data, which excludes lakes, ponds, glaciers > 1 km^{2} (0.386 sq mi or 247 acres) and river estuaries.

Annonville (French pronunciation: [anɔ̃vil]) is a commune in the Haute-Marne department in the Grand Est region in northeastern France.

== Population ==
Historical population
Year	Pop.	±% p.a.
1968	50	—
1975	42	−2.46%
1982	29	−5.15%
1990	46	+5.94%
1999	34	−3.30%
2007	32	−0.75%
2012	30	−1.28%
2017	32	+1.30%
2023	28	−2.20%
Source: INSEE

== See also ==
- Communes of the Haute-Marne department
