= Blécourt, Haute-Marne =

Blécourt
- Commune
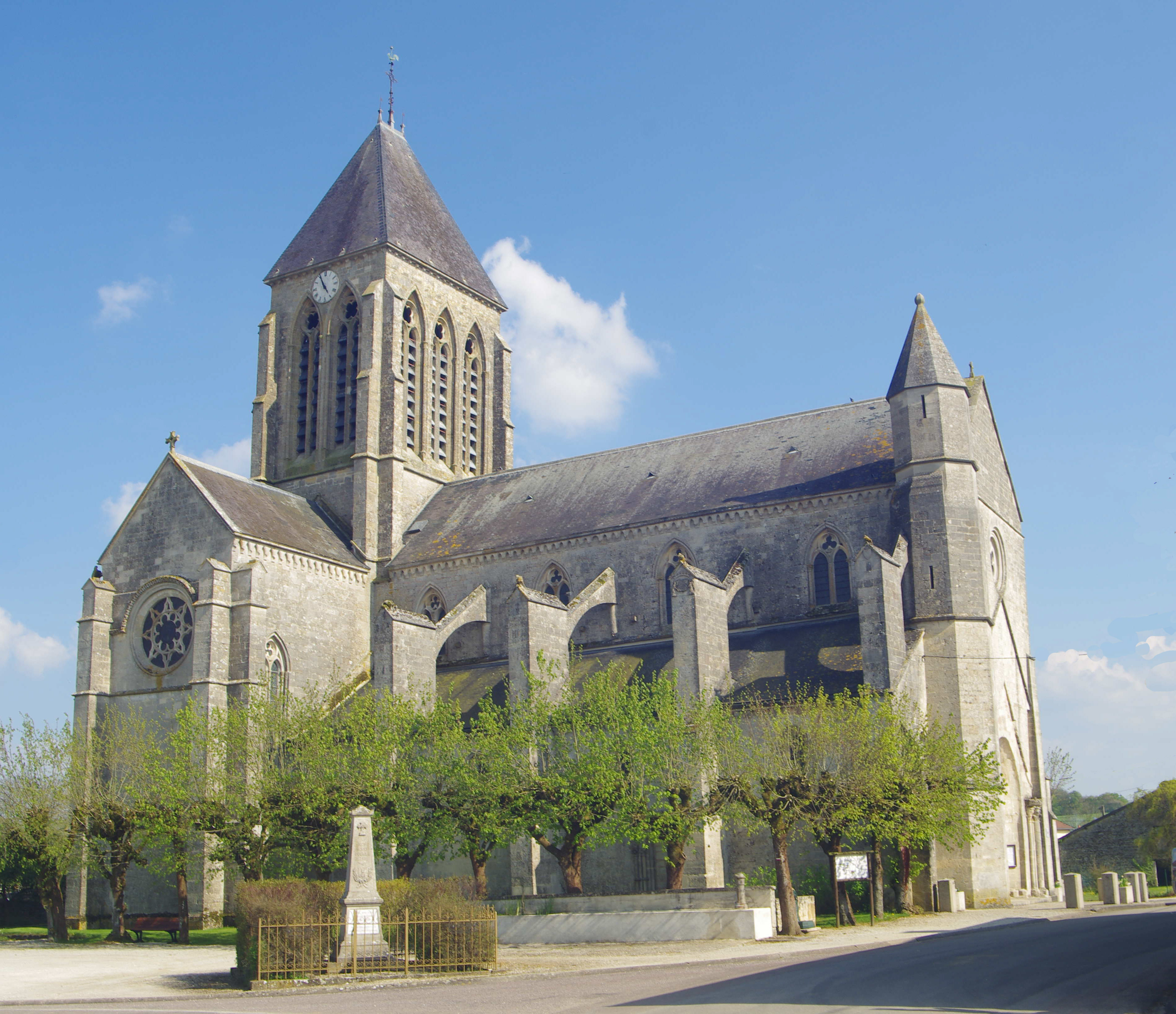
- The church in Blécourt
- Location of Blécourt
- Location within France Location within Grand Est
- Coordinates: 48°22′52″N 5°05′03″E
- Country: France
- Region: Grand Est
- Department: Haute-Marne
- Arrondissement: Saint-Dizier
- Canton: Joinville

Government
  - Mayor (2020–2026): Joseph Fustinoni
- Area^{1}: 7.25 km^{2} (2.80 sq mi)
- Elevation: 315 m (1,033 ft)
- Highest elevation: 372 m (1,220 ft)
- Lowest elevation: 250 m (820 ft)
- Population (2023): 111
  - Density: 15.3/km^{2} (39.7/sq mi)
- Time zone: UTC+01:00 (CET)
  - Summer (DST): UTC+02:00 (CEST)
- INSEE/Postal code: 52055 /52300
- ^{1} French Land Register data, which excludes lakes, ponds, glaciers > 1 km^{2} (0.386 sq mi or 247 acres) and river estuaries.

Blécourt (French pronunciation: [blekuʁ]) is a commune in the Haute-Marne department in northeastern France.

== Population ==
Historical population
Year	Pop.	±% p.a.
1968	136	—
1975	136	+0.00%
1982	130	−0.64%
1990	105	−2.63%
1999	118	+1.31%
2007	109	−0.99%
2012	112	+0.54%
2017	112	+0.00%
2023	111	−0.15%
Source: INSEE

== See also ==
- Communes of the Haute-Marne department
