= Mussey-sur-Marne =

- Commune
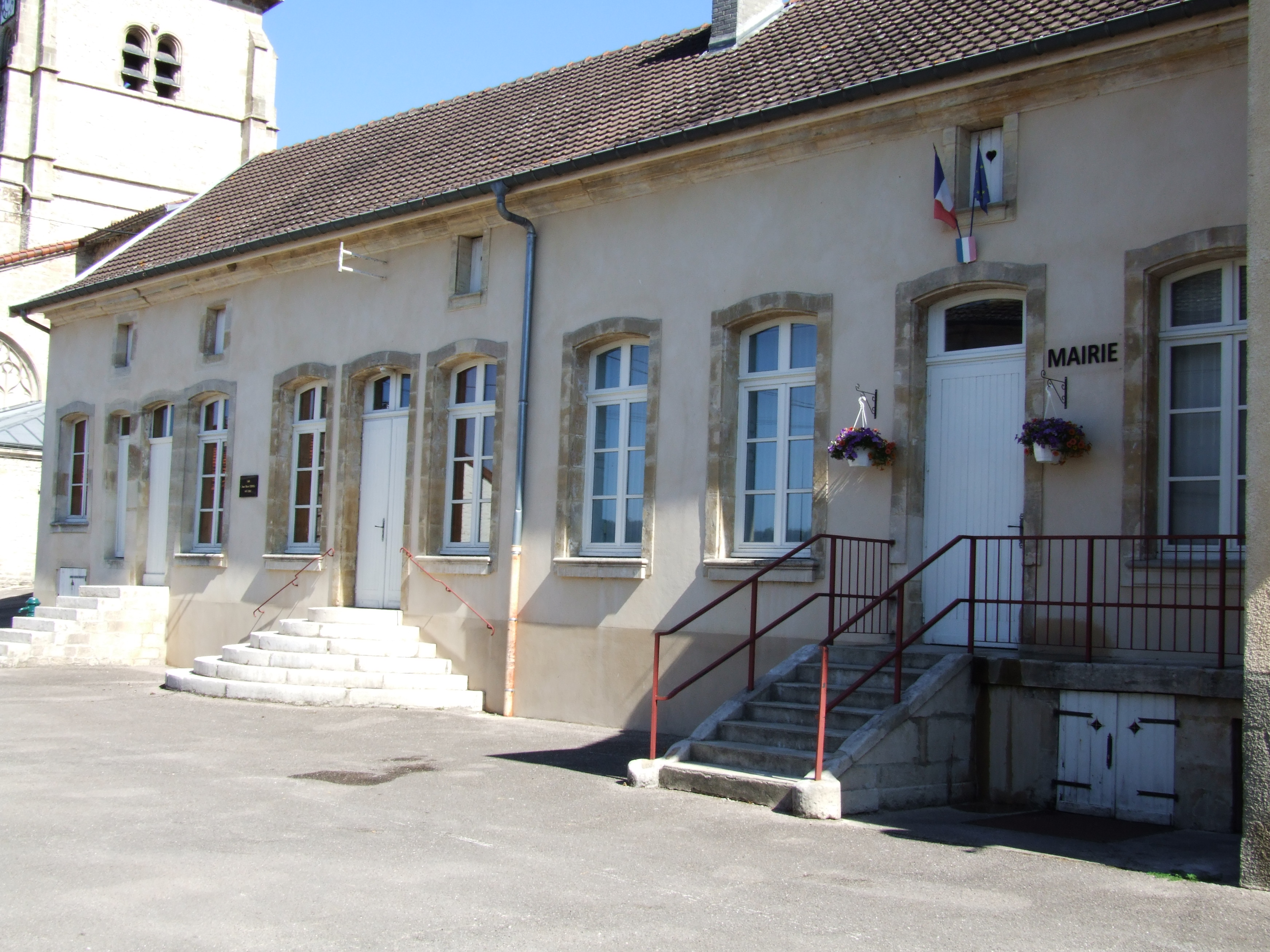
- The town hall in Mussey-sur-Marne
- Location of Mussey-sur-Marne
- Location within France Location within Grand Est
- Coordinates: 48°23′N 5°09′E
- Country: France
- Region: Grand Est
- Department: Haute-Marne
- Arrondissement: Saint-Dizier
- Canton: Joinville
- Intercommunality: Bassin de Joinville en Champagne

Government
  - Mayor (2020–2026): Pascal Renard
- Area^{1}: 9.92 km^{2} (3.83 sq mi)
- Elevation: 280 m (920 ft)
- Highest elevation: 368 m (1,207 ft)
- Lowest elevation: 192 m (630 ft)
- Population (2023): 349
  - Density: 35.2/km^{2} (91.1/sq mi)
- Time zone: UTC+01:00 (CET)
  - Summer (DST): UTC+02:00 (CEST)
- INSEE/Postal code: 52346 /52300
- ^{1} French Land Register data, which excludes lakes, ponds, glaciers > 1 km^{2} (0.386 sq mi or 247 acres) and river estuaries.

Mussey-sur-Marne (French pronunciation: [mysɛ syʁ maʁn], literally Mussey on Marne) is a commune in the Haute-Marne department in north-eastern France.

== See also ==
- Communes of the Haute-Marne department
