= Maurice Morlon =

French police officer and resistance fighter (1908 - 1988)

- Born: Maurice Henri Morlon; 19 September 1908; Eurville-Bienville
- Died: 16 April 1988; Le Gua
- Awards: Righteous Among the Nations (1971, France)

Maurice Morlon (September 19, 1908 - April 16, 1988) was a French police officer, resistance fighter, and Righteous Among the Nations.

As a police officer in Marmande, it is difficult to determine how many people he saved, but the number likely reaches several dozen. He is the only Righteous Among the Nations from the city of Marmande.

== Biography ==
Maurice Morlon was born in Eurville-Bienville in Haute-Marne on September 19, 1908.

=== World War II ===
During World War II, while serving as a police inspector in Marmande since 1942, Morlon decided to hide the Jews he could help. He provided Jewish families, including some he did not know, with identity papers that did not bear the "Jew" designation. Morlon collaborated with Michel Blum, a Jewish doctor who fabricated false identity documents, secretly supplying him with stamps to support his clandestine activities.

In 1943, he left his position and joined the maquis, directly aligning himself with Combat and later with the Mouvements unis de la Résistance.

It is difficult to determine how many people he saved, but the number likely reaches several dozen.

=== Post-war ===
In 1971, Morlon was awarded the title of Righteous Among the Nations by Yad Vashem. He is the only Righteous Among the Nations from the city of Marmande.

== Legacy ==
His name was proposed as a potential candidate for naming a street in Marmande in 2022.
