= Émile Baudot =

French telegraph engineer and inventor (1845–1903)

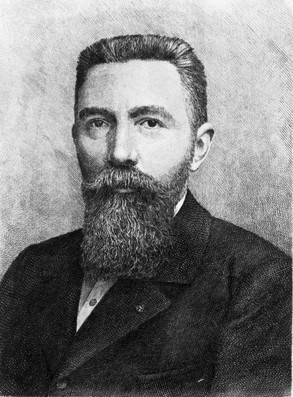
- Émile Baudot
- Born: 11 September 1845; Magneux, Haute-Marne, France
- Died: 28 March 1903 (aged 57); Sceaux, Hauts-de-Seine, France
- Spouse: Marie Josephine Adelaide Langrognet
- Engineering career
- Projects: Baudot code
- Significant advance: telecommunications
- Awards: Gold medal of the Exposition Universelle (1878); Knight's Cross of the Légion d'honneur, 1879; Officer of the Ordre national de la Légion d'honneur, 1898

Jean-Maurice-Émile Baudot (French: [emil bodo]; 11 September 1845 – 28 March 1903) was a French telegraph engineer and inventor of the first means of digital communication Baudot code. He was one of the pioneers of telecommunications. He invented a multiplexed printing telegraph system that used his code and allowed multiple transmissions over a single line. The baud unit was named after him.

== Early life ==
Baudot was born in Magneux, Haute-Marne, France, the son of farmer Pierre Émile Baudot, who later became the mayor of Magneux. His only formal education was at his local primary school, after which he carried out agricultural work on his father's farm before joining the French Post & Telegraph Administration as an apprentice operator in 1869.

The telegraph service trained him in the Morse telegraph and also sent him on a four-month course of instruction on the Hughes printing telegraph system, which was later to inspire his own system.

After serving briefly during the Franco-Prussian War, he returned to civilian duties in Paris in 1872.

== Telegraphy ==
The Telegraph Service encouraged Baudot to develop—on his own time—a system for time-multiplexing several telegraph messages using Hughes teleprinters. He realised that with most printing telegraphs of the period the line is idle for most of the time, apart from the brief intervals when a character is transmitted. Baudot devised one of the first applications of time-division multiplexing in telegraphy. Using synchronized clockwork-powered switches at the transmitting and receiving ends, he was able to transmit five messages simultaneously; the system was officially adopted by the French Post & Telegraph Administration five years later.

Baudot invented his telegraph code in 1870 and patented it in 1874. It was a 5-bit code, with equal on and off intervals, which allowed telegraph transmission of the Roman alphabet, punctuation and control signals. By 1874 or 1875 (various sources give both dates) he had also perfected the electromechanical hardware to transmit his code. His inventions were based on the printing mechanism from Hughes' instrument, a distributor invented by Bernard Meyer in 1871, and the five-unit code devised by Carl Friedrich Gauss and Wilhelm Weber. Baudot combined these, together with original ideas of his own, to produce a complete multiplex system.

== Baudot system ==
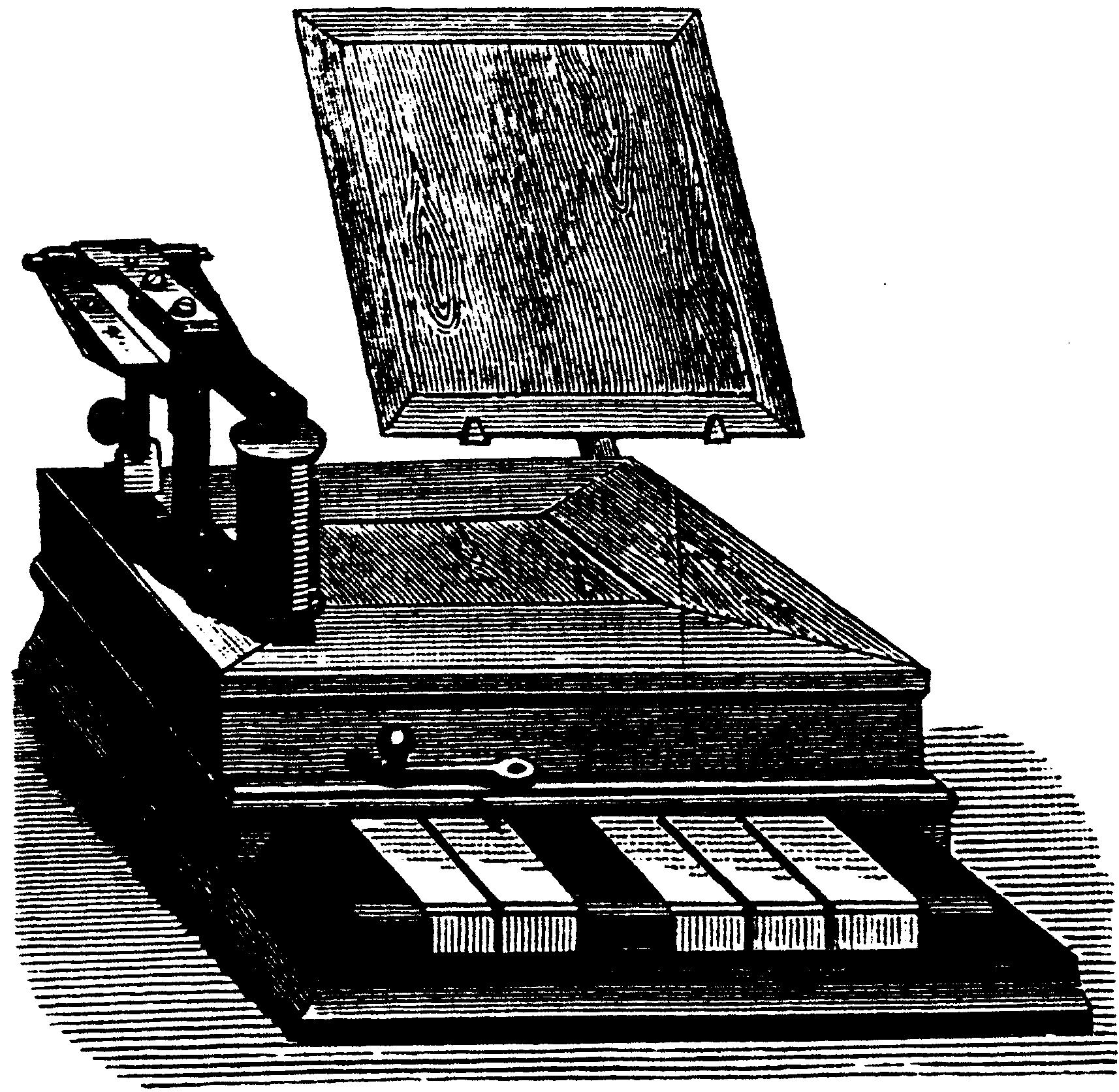
Baudot keyboard, Journal télégraphique 1884

On 17 June 1874 Baudot patented his first printing telegraph (Patent no. 103,898 "Système de télégraphie rapide"), in which the signals were translated automatically into typographic characters. Baudot's hardware had three main parts: the keyboard, the distributor, and a paper tape.

Each operator - there were as many as four - was allocated a single sector. The keyboard had just five piano type keys, operated with two fingers of the left hand and three fingers of the right hand. The five unit code was designed to be easy to remember. Once the keys had been pressed they were locked down until the contacts again passed over the sector connected to that particular keyboard, when the keyboard was unlocked ready for the next character to be entered, with an audible click (known as the "cadence signal") to warn the operator. Operators had to maintain a steady rhythm, and the usual speed of operation was 30 words per minute.

The receiver was also connected to the distributor. The signals from the telegraph line were temporarily stored on a set of five electromagnets, before being decoded to print the corresponding character on paper tape.

Accurate operation of this system depended on the distributor at the transmitting end keeping in synchronization with the one at the receiving end and operators only sending characters when the contacts passed over their allocated sector. This could be achieved at a speed of 30 wpm by strictly observing the "cadence" of rhythm of the system when the distributor gave the operator the use of the line.

== First use ==
The Baudot system was accepted by the French Telegraph Administration in 1875, with the first online tests of his system occurring between Paris and Bordeaux on 12 November 1877. At the end of 1877, the Paris-Rome line, which was about 1,700 kilometres (1,100 mi), began operating a duplex Baudot.

The Baudot apparatus was shown at the Paris Exposition Universelle (1878) and won him the Exposition's gold medal, as well as bringing his system to worldwide notice.

== Later career ==
After the first success of his system, Baudot was promoted to Controller in 1880, and was named Inspector-Engineer in 1882.

In July 1887 he conducted successful tests on the Atlantic telegraph cable between Weston-super-Mare and Waterville, Nova Scotia operated by the Commercial Company, with a double Baudot installed in duplex, the Baudot transmitters and receivers substituted for the recorder.

On 8 August 1890 he established communications between Paris, Vannes, and Lorient over a single wire. On 3 January 1894 he installed a triplex apparatus on the telegraph between Paris and Bordeaux that had previously been operating with some difficulty on the Hughes telegraph system. On 27 April 1894 he established communications between the Paris stock exchange and the Milan stock exchange, again over a single wire, using his new invention, the retransmitter.

In 1897 the Baudot system was improved by switching to punched tape, which was prepared offline like the Morse tape used with the Wheatstone and Creed systems. A tape reader, controlled by the Baudot distributor, then replaced the manual keyboard. The tape had five rows of holes for the code, with a sixth row of smaller holes for transporting the tape through the reader mechanism. Baudot's code was later standardised as International Telegraph Alphabet Number One.

Baudot received little help from the French Telegraph Administration for his system, and often had to fund his own research, even having to sell the gold medal awarded by the 1878 Exposition Universelle in 1880.

The Baudot telegraph system was employed progressively in France, and then was adopted in other countries, Italy being the first to introduce it, in its inland service, in 1887. The Netherlands followed in 1895, Switzerland in 1896, and Austria and Brazil in 1897. The British Post Office adopted it for a simplex circuit between London and Paris during 1897, then used it for more general purposes from 1898. In 1900 it was adopted by Germany, by Russia in 1904, the British West Indies in 1905, Spain in 1906, Belgium in 1909, Argentina in 1912, and Romania in 1913.

== Final years ==
Baudot married Marie Josephine Adelaide Langrognet on 15 January 1890. She died only three months later, on 9 April 1890.

Soon after starting work with the telegraph service, Baudot began to suffer physical discomfort and was frequently absent from work for this reason, for as long as a month on one occasion. His condition affected him for the rest of his life, until he died on 28 March 1903, at Sceaux, Hauts-de-Seine, near Paris, at the age of 57.

== Mimault patent suit ==
In 1874, French telegraph operator Louis Victor Mimault patented a telegraph system using five separate lines to transmit. After his patent was rejected by the Telegraph Administration, Mimault modified his device to incorporate features from the Meyer telegraph and obtained a new patent which was also rejected. In the meantime, Baudot had patented his prototype telegraph a few weeks earlier.

Mimault claimed priority of invention over Baudot and brought a patent suit against him in 1877. The Tribunal Civil de la Seine, which reviewed testimony from three experts unconnected with the Telegraph Administration, found in favor of Mimault and accorded him priority of invention of the Baudot code and ruled that Baudot's patents were simply improvements of Mimault's. Neither inventor was satisfied with this judgment, which was eventually rescinded with Mimault being ordered to pay all legal costs.

Mimault became unnerved because of the decision, and after an incident where he shot at and wounded two students of the École Polytechnique (charges for which were dropped), he demanded a special act to prolong the duration of his patents, 100,000 Francs, and election to the Légion d'honneur. A commission directed by Jules Raynaud (head of telegraph research) rejected his demands. Upon hearing the decision, Mimault shot and killed Raynaud, and was sentenced to 10 years of forced labour and 20 years of exile.

== Honors ==
- 1881 - Diploma of Honor from the International Electrical Exposition.
- 1882 - Gold medal from the Société d'Encouragement pour l'Industrie Nationale (SEIN)
- 1889 - Ampere Medal from SEIN
- 1878 - Knight's Cross of the Légion d'honneur
- 1882 - Knight of the Order of Leopold
- 1884 - Knight of the Order of Franz Joseph of Austria.
- 1891 - Cross of the Order of the Crown of Italy
- 1898 - Promoted to Officier of the Légion d'honneur
- 1900 - Knight of the Order of Saints Maurice and Lazarus (Italy)
- 1901 - Knight of the Order of the Crown of Italy
- A street in the 17th arrondissement of Paris was named after Baudot, but it no longer exists.
- In 1926 the International Telegraph Communications Advisory Committee of the International Telecommunication Union met in Berlin and immortalized Baudot by designating the baud - shortened from his name - as the unit of telegraph transmission speed.
- In 1949, the French Post Office issued a series of stamps with his portrait. By mistake, the year of his birth was given as 1848, not the correct 1845. The stamp was corrected and reprinted with a different color. However, the erroneous stamps still circulate among philatelists and have greater value than the corrected stamps.

== See also ==
- List of pioneers in computer science
