= Magneux =

Magneux may refer to the following places in France:

- Magneux, Marne, a commune in the Marne department
- Magneux, Haute-Marne, a commune in the Haute-Marne department
