= Narcy, Haute-Marne =

Narcy
- Commune
- Location of Narcy
- Location within France Location within Grand Est
- Coordinates: 48°35′04″N 5°05′14″E
- Country: France
- Region: Grand Est
- Department: Haute-Marne
- Arrondissement: Saint-Dizier
- Canton: Eurville-Bienville
- Intercommunality: CA Grand Saint-Dizier, Der et Vallées

Government
  - Mayor (2020–2026): Franck Leclère
- Area^{1}: 11.12 km^{2} (4.29 sq mi)
- Elevation: 190 m (620 ft)
- Population (2023): 201
  - Density: 18.1/km^{2} (46.8/sq mi)
- Time zone: UTC+01:00 (CET)
  - Summer (DST): UTC+02:00 (CEST)
- INSEE/Postal code: 52347 /52170
- ^{1} French Land Register data, which excludes lakes, ponds, glaciers > 1 km^{2} (0.386 sq mi or 247 acres) and river estuaries.

Narcy (French pronunciation: [naʁsi]) is a commune in the Haute-Marne department in north-eastern France.

== See also ==
- Communes of the Haute-Marne department
