= Osne-le-Val =

- Commune
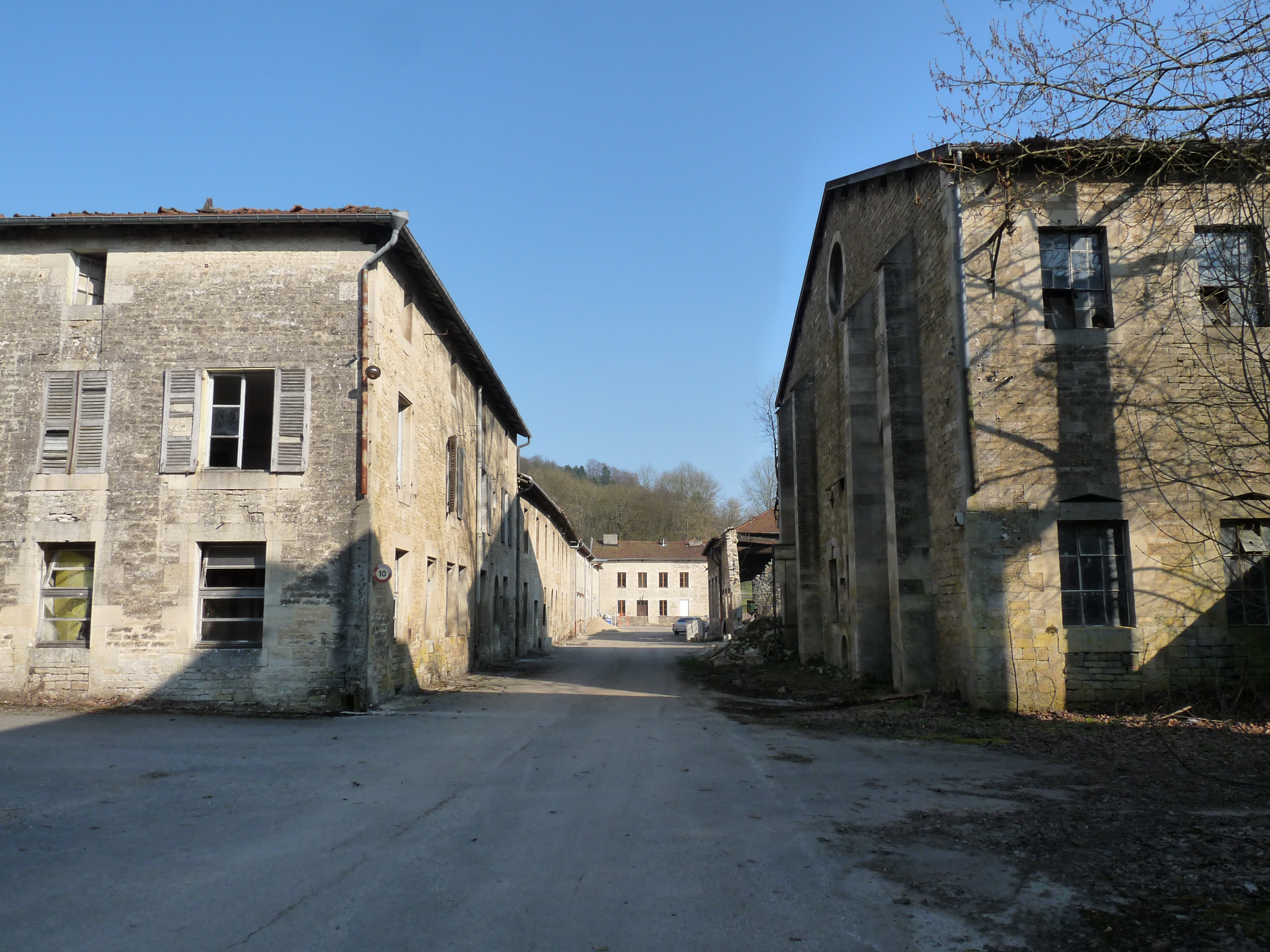
- The old foundry in Val d'Osne
- Location of Osne-le-Val
- Location within France Location within Grand Est
- Coordinates: 48°29′46″N 5°11′34″E
- Country: France
- Region: Grand Est
- Department: Haute-Marne
- Arrondissement: Saint-Dizier
- Canton: Eurville-Bienville
- Intercommunality: CA Grand Saint-Dizier, Der et Vallées

Government
  - Mayor (2020–2026): Yannick Richard
- Area^{1}: 26.92 km^{2} (10.39 sq mi)
- Elevation: 230 m (750 ft)
- Population (2023): 252
  - Density: 9.36/km^{2} (24.2/sq mi)
- Time zone: UTC+01:00 (CET)
  - Summer (DST): UTC+02:00 (CEST)
- INSEE/Postal code: 52370 /52300
- ^{1} French Land Register data, which excludes lakes, ponds, glaciers > 1 km^{2} (0.386 sq mi or 247 acres) and river estuaries.

Osne-le-Val (French pronunciation: [on lə val]) is a commune in the Haute-Marne department in north-eastern France.

== See also ==
- Communes of the Haute-Marne department
