= Trois-Fontaines-l'Abbaye =

- Commune
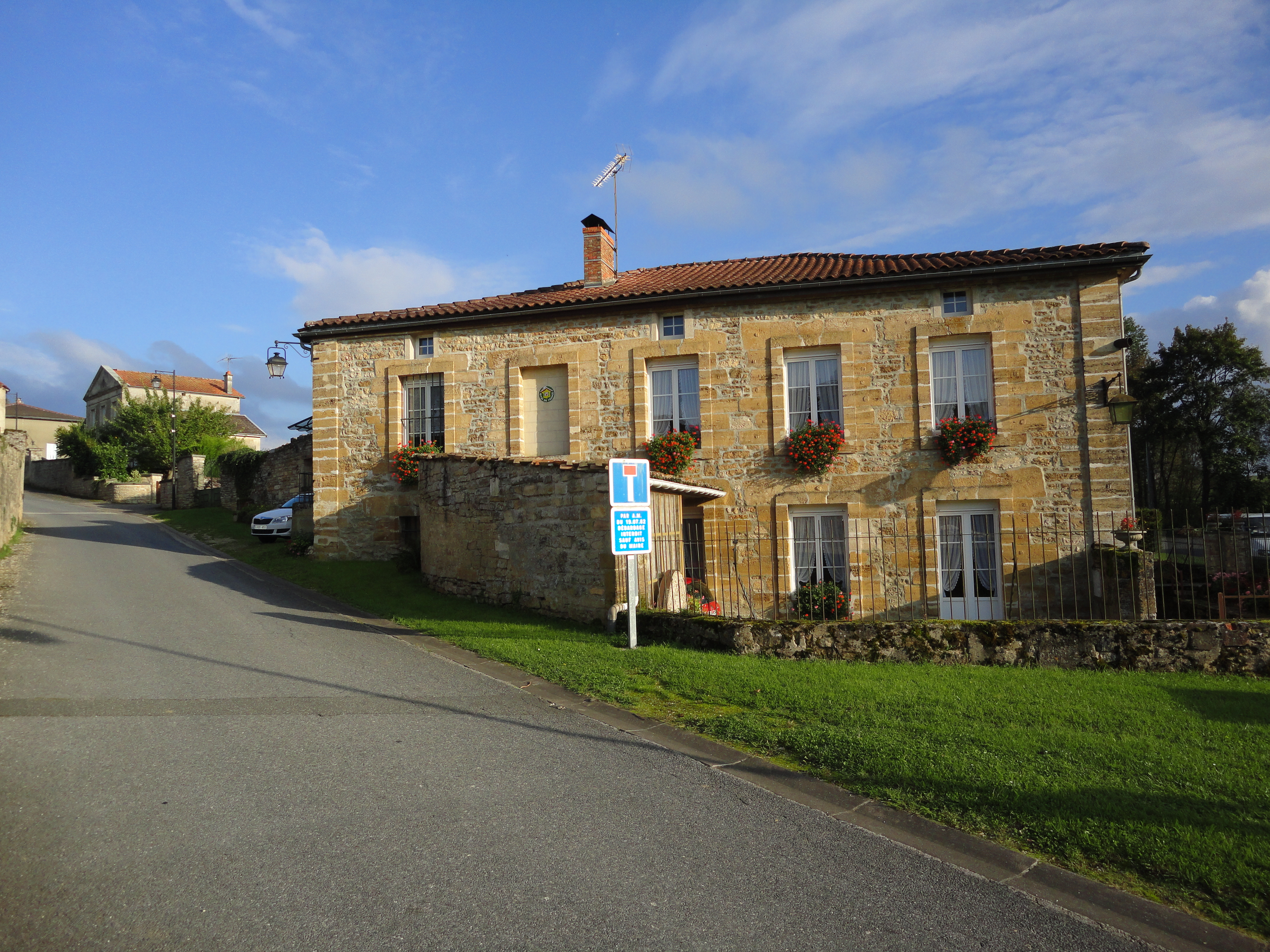
- The mill in Trois-Fontaines-l'Abbaye

- Coat of arms
- Location of Trois-Fontaines-l'Abbaye
- Location within France Location within Grand Est
- Coordinates: 48°43′07″N 4°57′01″E
- Country: France
- Region: Grand Est
- Department: Marne
- Arrondissement: Vitry-le-François
- Canton: Sermaize-les-Bains
- Intercommunality: CA Grand Saint-Dizier, Der et Vallées

Government
  - Mayor (2020–2026): Étienne Gaillard
- Area^{1}: 43.71 km^{2} (16.88 sq mi)
- Elevation: 169 m (554 ft)
- Population (2023): 191
  - Density: 4.37/km^{2} (11.3/sq mi)
- Time zone: UTC+01:00 (CET)
  - Summer (DST): UTC+02:00 (CEST)
- INSEE/Postal code: 51583 /51340
- ^{1} French Land Register data, which excludes lakes, ponds, glaciers > 1 km^{2} (0.386 sq mi or 247 acres) and river estuaries.

Trois-Fontaines-l'Abbaye (French pronunciation: [tʁwɑ fɔ̃tɛn labe.i]; "Three Fountains Abbey") is a commune in the northeastern French department of Marne.

== See also ==
- Communes of the Marne department
