= Roches-sur-Marne =

- Commune
- Location of Roches-sur-Marne
- Location within France Location within Grand Est
- Coordinates: 48°36′26″N 5°02′18″E
- Country: France
- Region: Grand Est
- Department: Haute-Marne
- Arrondissement: Saint-Dizier
- Canton: Eurville-Bienville
- Intercommunality: CA Grand Saint-Dizier, Der et Vallées

Government
  - Mayor (2020–2026): Jacky Millot
- Area^{1}: 7.87 km^{2} (3.04 sq mi)
- Elevation: 159 m (522 ft)
- Highest elevation: 215 m (705 ft)
- Lowest elevation: 147 m (482 ft)
- Population (2023): 582
  - Density: 74.0/km^{2} (192/sq mi)
- Time zone: UTC+01:00 (CET)
  - Summer (DST): UTC+02:00 (CEST)
- INSEE/Postal code: 52429 /52410
- ^{1} French Land Register data, which excludes lakes, ponds, glaciers > 1 km^{2} (0.386 sq mi or 247 acres) and river estuaries.

Roches-sur-Marne (French pronunciation: [ʁɔʃ syʁ maʁn], literally Roches on Marne) is a commune in the Haute-Marne department in north-eastern France.

== See also ==
- Communes of the Haute-Marne department
