= Communauté d'agglomération Grand Saint-Dizier, Der et Vallées =

Grand Saint-Dizier, Der et Vallées
- Communauté d'agglomération
- Interactive map of Grand Saint-Dizier, Der et Vallées
- Coordinates: 48°35′N 04°55′E
- Country: France
- Region: Grand Est
- Department: Haute-Marne, Marne
- No. of communes: {{{nbcomm}}}
- Established: 2017
- Area: 929.7 km^{2} (359.0 sq mi)
- Population (2019): 56,395
  - Density: 60.66/km^{2} (157.1/sq mi)
- Website: www.saint-dizier.fr

Communauté d'agglomération Grand Saint-Dizier, Der et Vallées (before February 2024: Communauté d'agglomération de Saint-Dizier Der et Blaise) is the communauté d'agglomération, an intercommunal structure, centred on the town of Saint-Dizier. It is located in the Haute-Marne and Marne departments, in the Grand Est region, northeastern France. Created in 2017, its seat is in Saint-Dizier. Its area is 929.7 km^{2}. Its population was 56,395 in 2019, of which 22,928 in Saint-Dizier proper.

== Composition ==
The communauté d'agglomération consists of the following 60 communes, of which 10 in the Marne department:

1. Allichamps
2. Ambrières
3. Attancourt
4. Bailly-aux-Forges
5. Bayard-sur-Marne
6. Bettancourt-la-Ferrée
7. Brousseval
8. Ceffonds
9. Chamouilley
10. Chancenay
11. Cheminon
12. Chevillon
13. Curel
14. Domblain
15. Dommartin-le-Franc
16. Doulevant-le-Petit
17. Éclaron-Braucourt-Sainte-Livière
18. Eurville-Bienville
19. Fays
20. Fontaines-sur-Marne
21. Frampas
22. Hallignicourt
23. Hauteville
24. Humbécourt
25. Landricourt
26. Laneuville-à-Rémy
27. Laneuville-au-Pont
28. La Porte du Der
29. Louvemont
30. Magneux
31. Maizières
32. Maurupt-le-Montois
33. Moëslains
34. Montreuil-sur-Blaise
35. Morancourt
36. Narcy
37. Osne-le-Val
38. Perthes
39. Planrupt
40. Rachecourt-sur-Marne
41. Rachecourt-Suzémont
42. Rives Dervoises
43. Roches-sur-Marne
44. Saint-Dizier
45. Saint-Eulien
46. Saint-Vrain
47. Sapignicourt
48. Sommancourt
49. Sommevoire
50. Thilleux
51. Trois-Fontaines-l'Abbaye
52. Troisfontaines-la-Ville
53. Valcourt
54. Valleret
55. Vaux-sur-Blaise
56. Ville-en-Blaisois
57. Villiers-en-Lieu
58. Voillecomte
59. Vouillers
60. Wassy
