= Attancourt =

- Commune
- Coat of arms
- Location of Attancourt
- Location within France Location within Grand Est
- Coordinates: 48°31′38″N 4°55′49″E
- Country: France
- Region: Grand Est
- Department: Haute-Marne
- Arrondissement: Saint-Dizier
- Canton: Wassy
- Intercommunality: CA Grand Saint-Dizier, Der et Vallées

Government
  - Mayor (2020–2026): Bernadette Galicher
- Area^{1}: 10.02 km^{2} (3.87 sq mi)
- Elevation: 159 m (522 ft)
- Highest elevation: 211 m (692 ft)
- Lowest elevation: 149 m (489 ft)
- Population (2023): 275
  - Density: 27.4/km^{2} (71.1/sq mi)
- Time zone: UTC+01:00 (CET)
  - Summer (DST): UTC+02:00 (CEST)
- INSEE/Postal code: 52021 /52130
- ^{1} French Land Register data, which excludes lakes, ponds, glaciers > 1 km^{2} (0.386 sq mi or 247 acres) and river estuaries.

Attancourt (French pronunciation: [atɑ̃kuʁ]) is a commune in the Haute-Marne department in the Grand Est region in northeastern France.

== Geography ==
The river Blaise flows through the commune.

== Population ==
Historical population
Year	Pop.	±% p.a.
1968	208	—
1975	195	−0.92%
1982	307	+6.70%
1990	278	−1.23%
1999	241	−1.57%
2007	242	+0.05%
2012	244	+0.16%
2017	260	+1.28%
2023	275	+0.94%
Source: INSEE

== See also ==
- Communes of the Haute-Marne department
