= Chamouilley =

- Commune
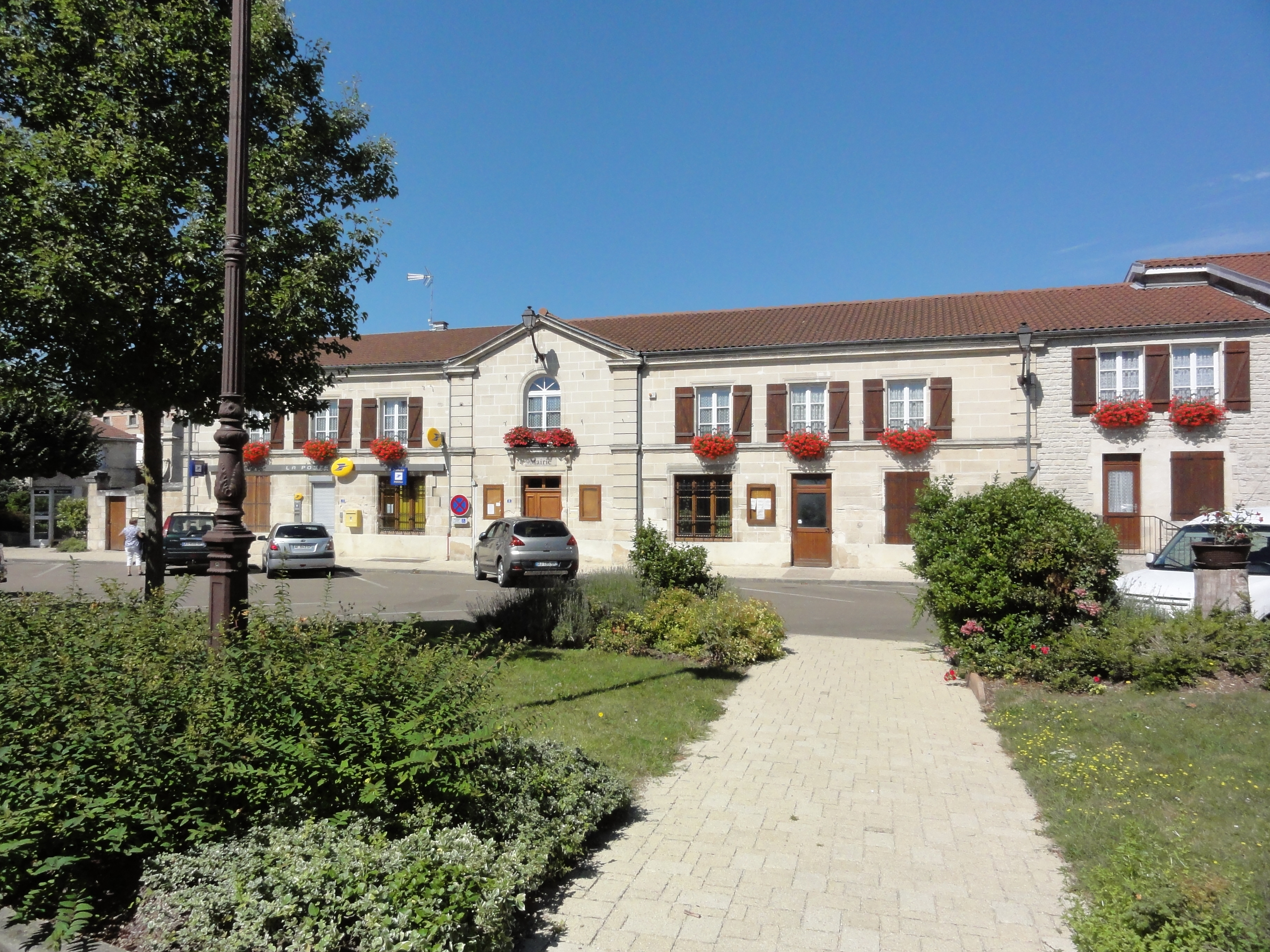
- The town hall in Chamouilley
- Location of Chamouilley
- Location within France Location within Grand Est
- Coordinates: 48°36′24″N 5°02′42″E
- Country: France
- Region: Grand Est
- Department: Haute-Marne
- Arrondissement: Saint-Dizier
- Canton: Eurville-Bienville
- Intercommunality: CA Grand Saint-Dizier, Der et Vallées

Government
  - Mayor (2020–2026): Eugène Perez
- Area^{1}: 7.81 km^{2} (3.02 sq mi)
- Elevation: 160 m (520 ft)
- Highest elevation: 239 m (784 ft)
- Lowest elevation: 147 m (482 ft)
- Population (2023): 721
  - Density: 92.3/km^{2} (239/sq mi)
- Time zone: UTC+01:00 (CET)
  - Summer (DST): UTC+02:00 (CEST)
- INSEE/Postal code: 52099 /52410
- ^{1} French Land Register data, which excludes lakes, ponds, glaciers > 1 km^{2} (0.386 sq mi or 247 acres) and river estuaries.

Chamouilley (French pronunciation: [ʃamujɛ]) is a commune in the Haute-Marne department in north-eastern France.

== See also ==
- Communes of the Haute-Marne department
