= Fays, Haute-Marne =

Fays
- Commune
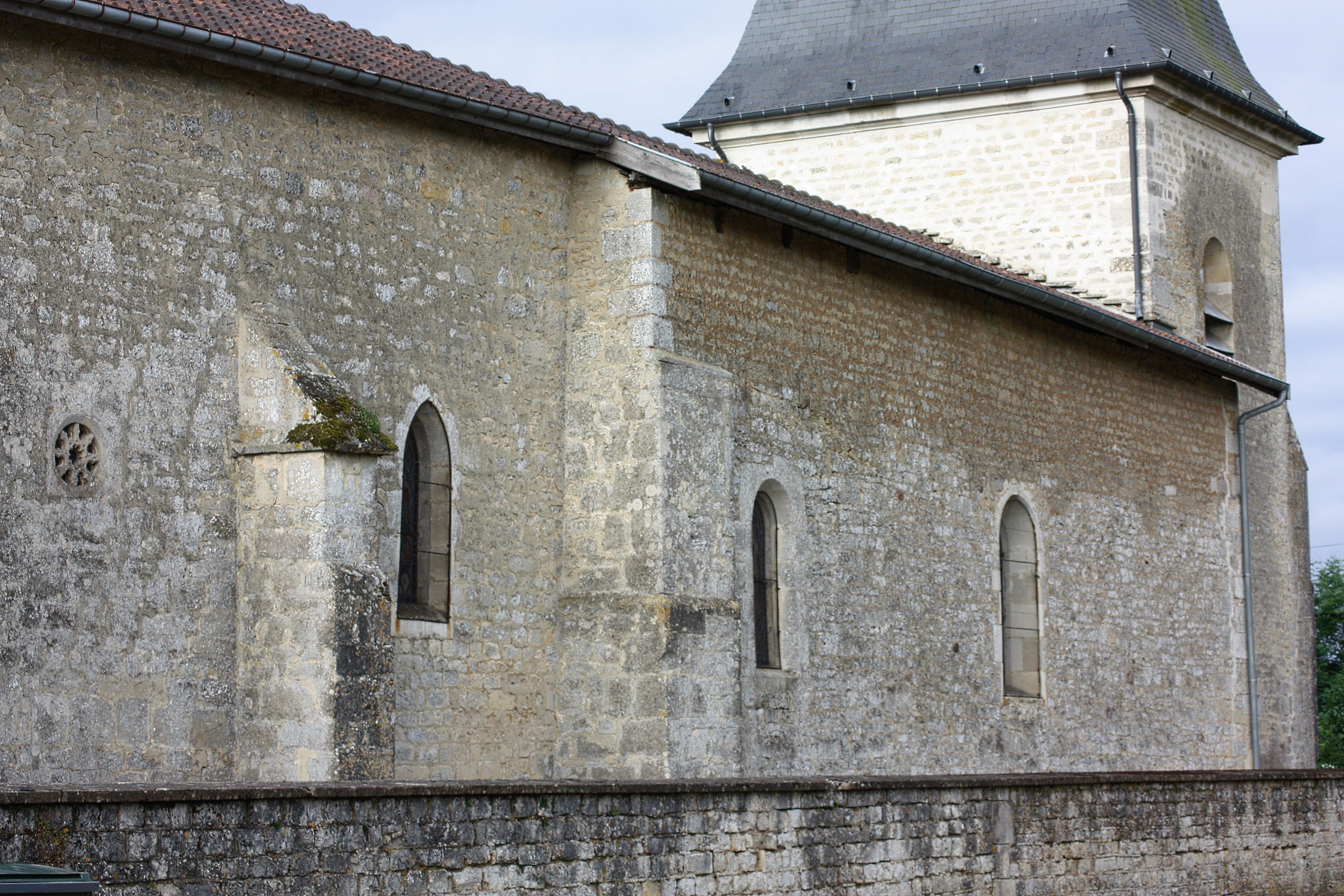
- The church in Fays

- Coat of arms
- Location of Fays
- Location within France Location within Grand Est
- Coordinates: 48°28′28″N 5°02′09″E
- Country: France
- Region: Grand Est
- Department: Haute-Marne
- Arrondissement: Saint-Dizier
- Canton: Eurville-Bienville
- Intercommunality: CA Grand Saint-Dizier, Der et Vallées

Government
  - Mayor (2020–2026): Yannick Gouget
- Area^{1}: 5.98 km^{2} (2.31 sq mi)
- Elevation: 275 m (902 ft)
- Highest elevation: 290 m (950 ft)
- Lowest elevation: 207 m (679 ft)
- Population (2023): 61
  - Density: 10/km^{2} (26/sq mi)
- Time zone: UTC+01:00 (CET)
  - Summer (DST): UTC+02:00 (CEST)
- INSEE/Postal code: 52198 /52130
- ^{1} French Land Register data, which excludes lakes, ponds, glaciers > 1 km^{2} (0.386 sq mi or 247 acres) and river estuaries.

Fays is a commune in the Haute-Marne department in north-eastern France.

== See also ==
- Communes of the Haute-Marne department
