= Curel, Haute-Marne =

Curel
- Commune
- Coat of arms
- Location of Curel
- Location within France Location within Grand Est
- Coordinates: 48°29′33″N 5°08′15″E
- Country: France
- Region: Grand Est
- Department: Haute-Marne
- Arrondissement: Saint-Dizier
- Canton: Eurville-Bienville
- Intercommunality: CA Grand Saint-Dizier, Der et Vallées

Government
  - Mayor (2020–2026): David Colin
- Area^{1}: 7.63 km^{2} (2.95 sq mi)
- Elevation: 177 m (581 ft)
- Highest elevation: 332 m (1,089 ft)
- Lowest elevation: 171 m (561 ft)
- Population (2023): 407
  - Density: 53.3/km^{2} (138/sq mi)
- Time zone: UTC+01:00 (CET)
  - Summer (DST): UTC+02:00 (CEST)
- INSEE/Postal code: 52156 /52300
- ^{1} French Land Register data, which excludes lakes, ponds, glaciers > 1 km^{2} (0.386 sq mi or 247 acres) and river estuaries.

Curel (French pronunciation: [kyʁɛl]) is a commune in the Haute-Marne department in north-eastern France.

== See also ==
- Communes of the Haute-Marne department
