= Sapignicourt =

- Commune
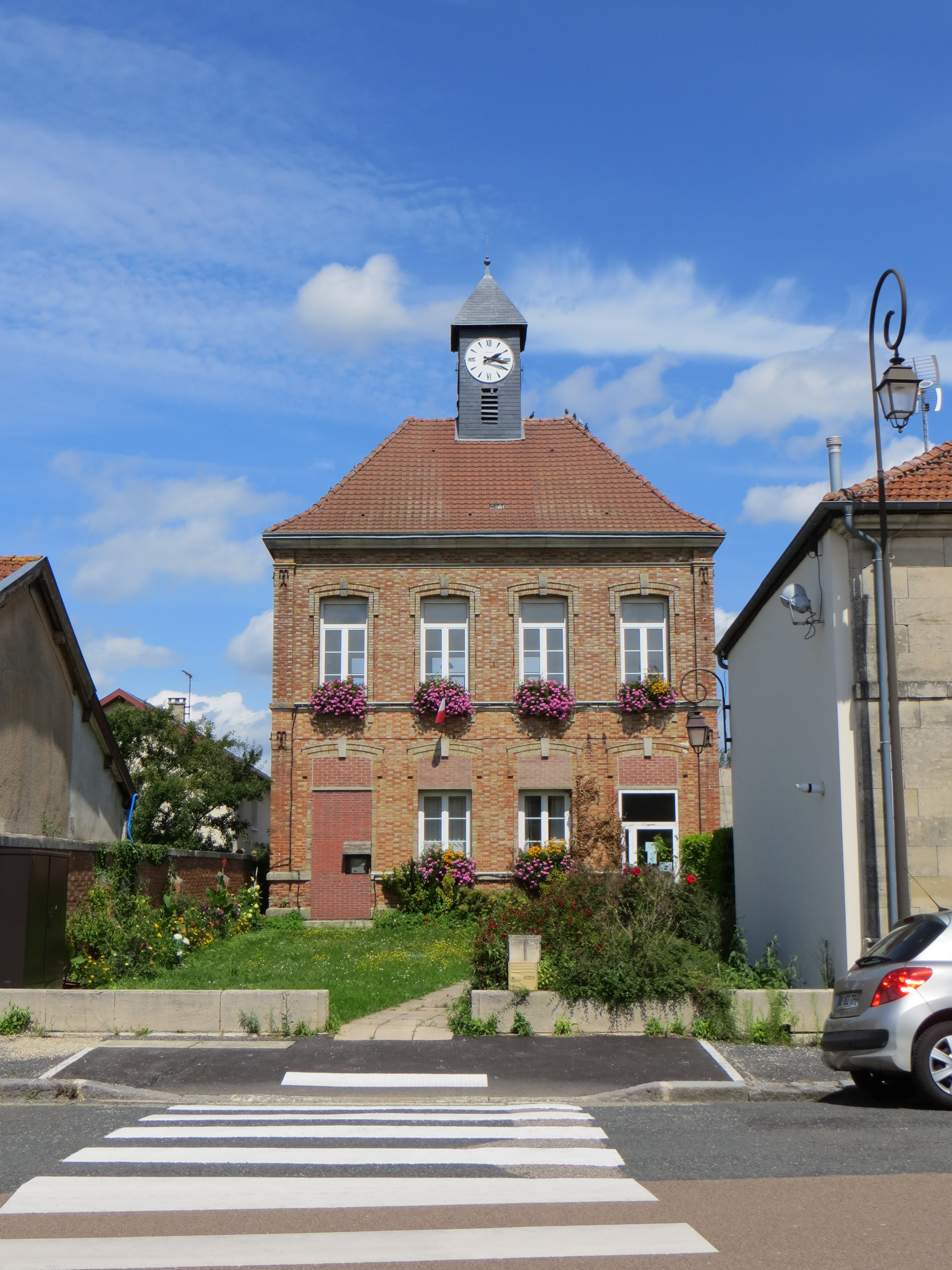
- Town hall
- Location of Sapignicourt
- Location within France Location within Grand Est
- Coordinates: 48°39′06″N 4°48′51″E
- Country: France
- Region: Grand Est
- Department: Marne
- Arrondissement: Vitry-le-François
- Canton: Sermaize-les-Bains
- Intercommunality: CA Grand Saint-Dizier, Der et Vallées

Government
  - Mayor (2020–2026): Alain Simon
- Area^{1}: 4.82 km^{2} (1.86 sq mi)
- Elevation: 120 m (390 ft)
- Population (2023): 365
  - Density: 75.7/km^{2} (196/sq mi)
- Time zone: UTC+01:00 (CET)
  - Summer (DST): UTC+02:00 (CEST)
- INSEE/Postal code: 51522 /52100
- ^{1} French Land Register data, which excludes lakes, ponds, glaciers > 1 km^{2} (0.386 sq mi or 247 acres) and river estuaries.

Sapignicourt (French pronunciation: [sapiɲikuʁ]) is a commune in the Marne department in north-eastern France.

== See also ==
- Communes of the Marne department
