= Valleret =

- Commune
- Location of Valleret
- Location within France Location within Grand Est
- Coordinates: 48°29′19″N 5°00′10″E
- Country: France
- Region: Grand Est
- Department: Haute-Marne
- Arrondissement: Saint-Dizier
- Canton: Eurville-Bienville
- Intercommunality: CA Grand Saint-Dizier, Der et Vallées

Government
  - Mayor (2020–2026): Vincent Rondelet
- Area^{1}: 4.76 km^{2} (1.84 sq mi)
- Elevation: 248 m (814 ft)
- Highest elevation: 263 m (863 ft)
- Lowest elevation: 183 m (600 ft)
- Population (2023): 59
  - Density: 12/km^{2} (32/sq mi)
- Time zone: UTC+01:00 (CET)
  - Summer (DST): UTC+02:00 (CEST)
- INSEE/Postal code: 52502 /52130
- ^{1} French Land Register data, which excludes lakes, ponds, glaciers > 1 km^{2} (0.386 sq mi or 247 acres) and river estuaries.

Valleret (French pronunciation: [valʁɛ]) is a commune in the Haute-Marne department in north-eastern France.

== See also ==
- Communes of the Haute-Marne department
