= Fontaines-sur-Marne =

- Commune
- Location of Fontaines-sur-Marne
- Location within France Location within Grand Est
- Coordinates: 48°32′44″N 5°06′12″E
- Country: France
- Region: Grand Est
- Department: Haute-Marne
- Arrondissement: Saint-Dizier
- Canton: Eurville-Bienville
- Intercommunality: CA Grand Saint-Dizier, Der et Vallées

Government
  - Mayor (2020–2026): Jean Marchandet
- Area^{1}: 6.47 km^{2} (2.50 sq mi)
- Elevation: 170 m (560 ft)
- Highest elevation: 309 m (1,014 ft)
- Lowest elevation: 162 m (531 ft)
- Population (2023): 151
  - Density: 23.3/km^{2} (60.4/sq mi)
- Time zone: UTC+01:00 (CET)
  - Summer (DST): UTC+02:00 (CEST)
- INSEE/Postal code: 52203 /52170
- ^{1} French Land Register data, which excludes lakes, ponds, glaciers > 1 km^{2} (0.386 sq mi or 247 acres) and river estuaries.

Fontaines-sur-Marne is a commune in the Haute-Marne department in north-eastern France.

== See also ==
- Communes of the Haute-Marne department
