= Saint-Vrain, Marne =

Saint-Vrain
- Commune
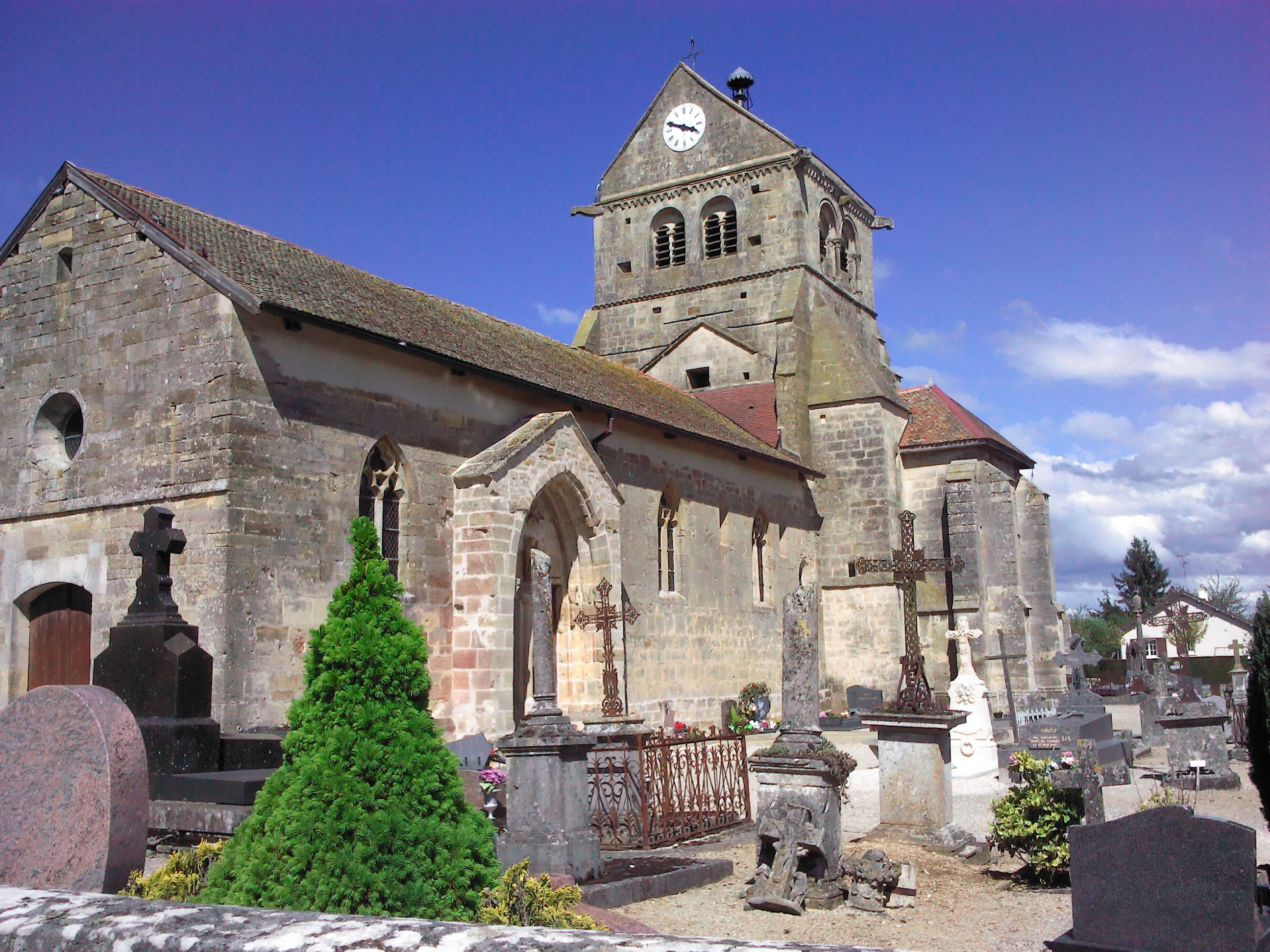
- The church in Saint-Vrain

- Coat of arms
- Location of Saint-Vrain
- Location within France Location within Grand Est
- Coordinates: 48°41′44″N 4°48′16″E
- Country: France
- Region: Grand Est
- Department: Marne
- Arrondissement: Vitry-le-François
- Canton: Sermaize-les-Bains
- Intercommunality: CA Grand Saint-Dizier, Der et Vallées

Government
  - Mayor (2020–2026): Franck Turcato
- Area^{1}: 11.57 km^{2} (4.47 sq mi)
- Elevation: 140 m (460 ft)
- Population (2023): 231
  - Density: 20.0/km^{2} (51.7/sq mi)
- Time zone: UTC+01:00 (CET)
  - Summer (DST): UTC+02:00 (CEST)
- INSEE/Postal code: 51521 /51340
- ^{1} French Land Register data, which excludes lakes, ponds, glaciers > 1 km^{2} (0.386 sq mi or 247 acres) and river estuaries.

Saint-Vrain (French pronunciation: [sɛ̃ vʁɛ̃]) is a commune in the Marne department in north-eastern France.

== Population ==
Historical population
Year	Pop.	±% p.a.
1968	178	—
1975	137	−3.67%
1982	175	+3.56%
1990	213	+2.49%
1999	217	+0.21%
2007	205	−0.71%
2012	203	−0.20%
2017	233	+2.79%
2023	231	−0.14%
Source: INSEE

== See also ==
- Communes of the Marne department
