= Domblain =

- Commune
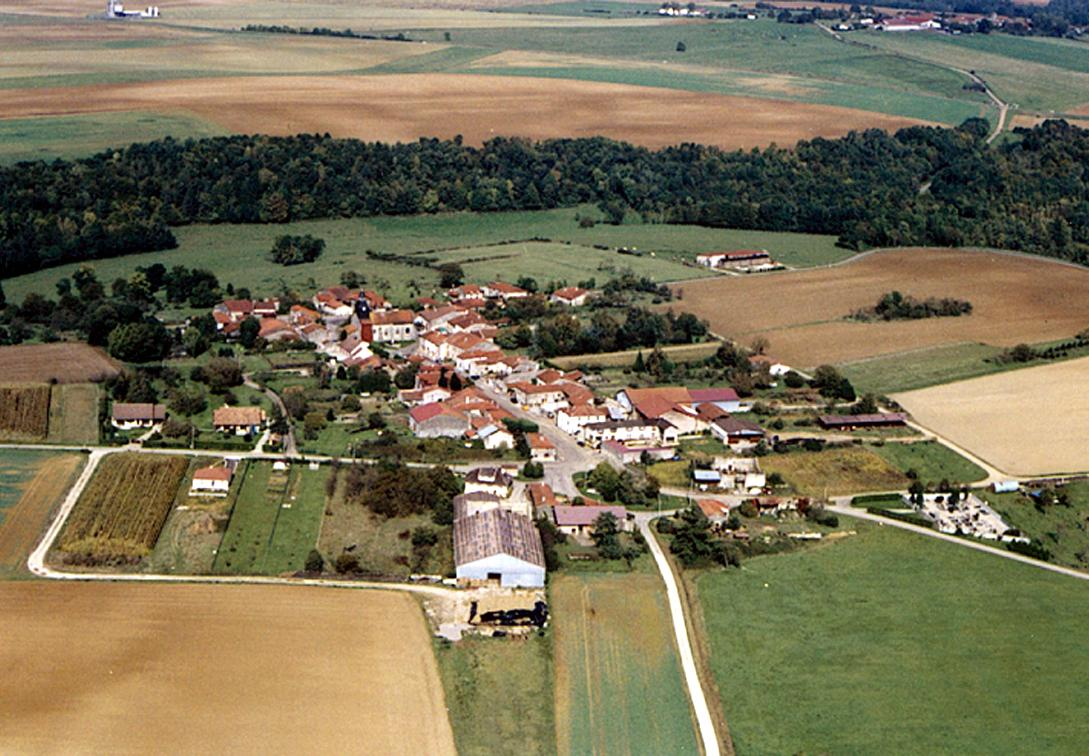
- An aerial view of Domblain in 2006
- Location of Domblain
- Location within France Location within Grand Est
- Coordinates: 48°28′17″N 4°59′40″E
- Country: France
- Region: Grand Est
- Department: Haute-Marne
- Arrondissement: Saint-Dizier
- Canton: Eurville-Bienville
- Intercommunality: CA Grand Saint-Dizier, Der et Vallées

Government
  - Mayor (2020–2026): Guillaume Delvaux
- Area^{1}: 5.33 km^{2} (2.06 sq mi)
- Elevation: 227 m (745 ft)
- Highest elevation: 260 m (850 ft)
- Lowest elevation: 160 m (520 ft)
- Population (2023): 86
  - Density: 16/km^{2} (42/sq mi)
- Time zone: UTC+01:00 (CET)
  - Summer (DST): UTC+02:00 (CEST)
- INSEE/Postal code: 52169 /52130
- ^{1} French Land Register data, which excludes lakes, ponds, glaciers > 1 km^{2} (0.386 sq mi or 247 acres) and river estuaries.

Domblain (French pronunciation: [dɔ̃blɛ̃]) is a commune in the Haute-Marne department in north-eastern France.

== See also ==
- Communes of the Haute-Marne department
