= Saint-Eulien =

- Commune
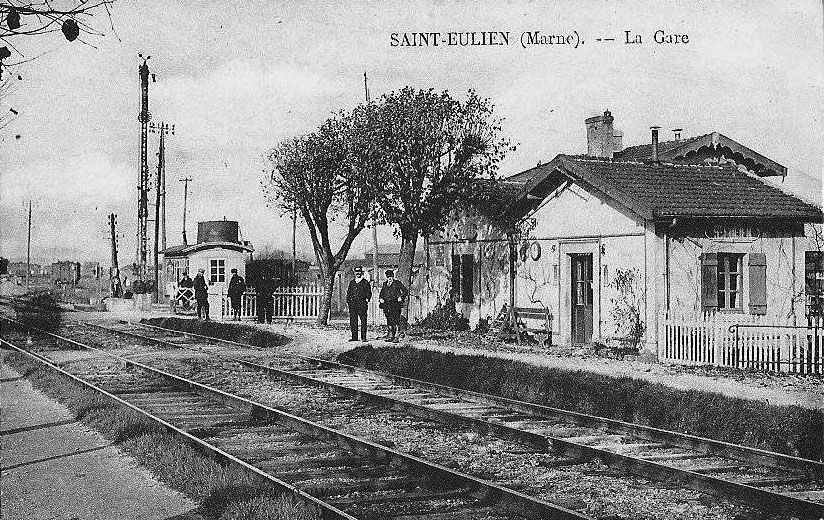
- The railway station in the early 20th century in Saint-Eulien
- Location of Saint-Eulien
- Location within France Location within Grand Est
- Coordinates: 48°41′04″N 4°52′59″E
- Country: France
- Region: Grand Est
- Department: Marne
- Arrondissement: Vitry-le-François
- Canton: Sermaize-les-Bains
- Intercommunality: CA Grand Saint-Dizier, Der et Vallées

Government
  - Mayor (2020–2026): Régis Valton
- Area^{1}: 8.06 km^{2} (3.11 sq mi)
- Elevation: 141 m (463 ft)
- Highest elevation: 174 m (571 ft)
- Lowest elevation: 131 m (430 ft)
- Population (2023): 413
  - Density: 51.2/km^{2} (133/sq mi)
- Time zone: UTC+01:00 (CET)
  - Summer (DST): UTC+02:00 (CEST)
- INSEE/Postal code: 51478 /51100
- ^{1} French Land Register data, which excludes lakes, ponds, glaciers > 1 km^{2} (0.386 sq mi or 247 acres) and river estuaries.

Saint-Eulien (French pronunciation: [sɛ̃.t‿øljɛ̃]) is a commune in the Marne department in north-eastern France.

== See also ==
- Communes of the Marne department
