= Ville-en-Blaisois =

- Commune
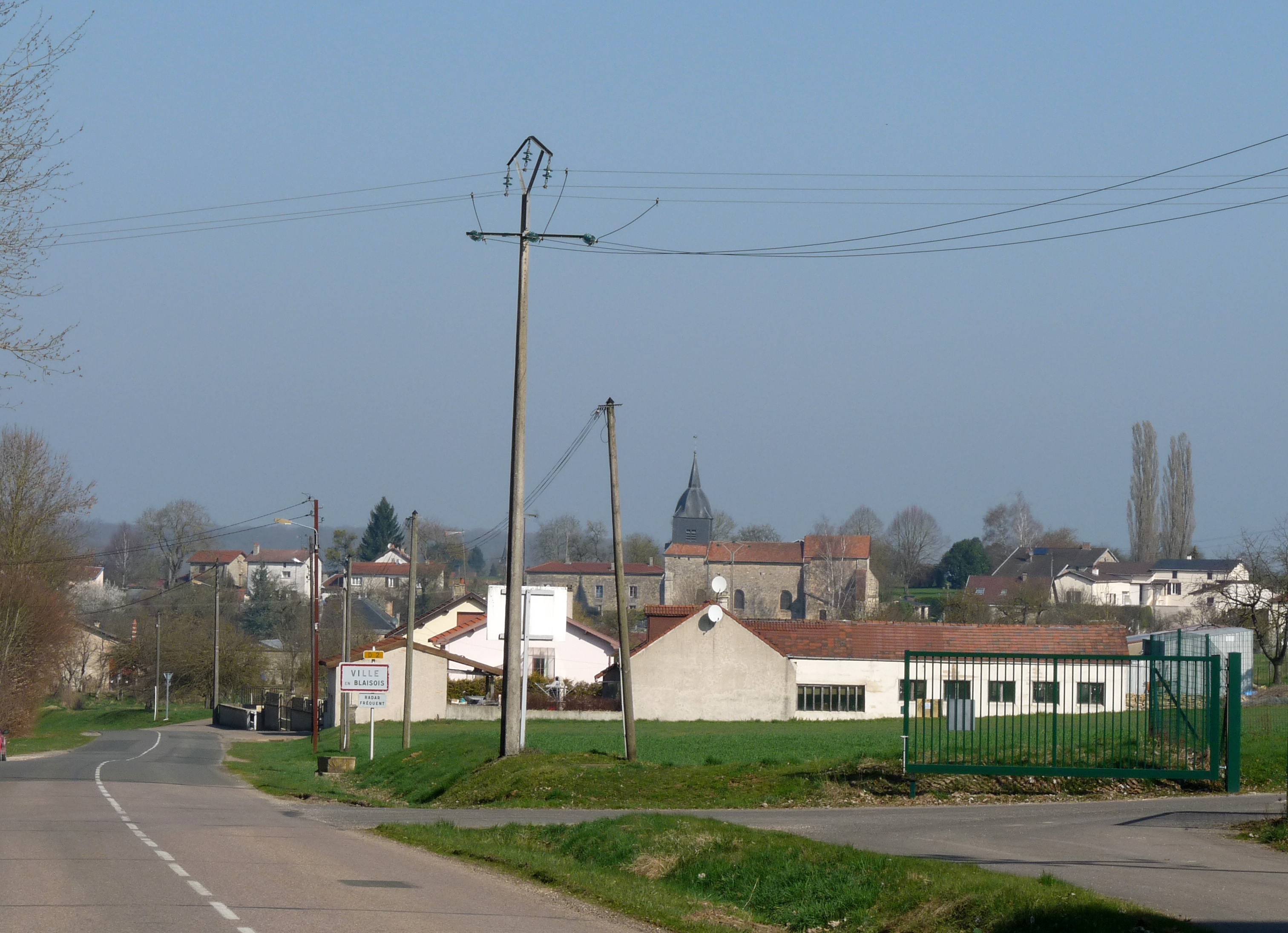
- A general view of Ville-en-Blaisois
- Location of Ville-en-Blaisois
- Location within France Location within Grand Est
- Coordinates: 48°26′26″N 4°57′37″E
- Country: France
- Region: Grand Est
- Department: Haute-Marne
- Arrondissement: Saint-Dizier
- Canton: Wassy
- Intercommunality: CA Grand Saint-Dizier, Der et Vallées

Government
  - Mayor (2020–2026): Christian Bancelin
- Area^{1}: 6.89 km^{2} (2.66 sq mi)
- Elevation: 188 m (617 ft)
- Highest elevation: 228 m (748 ft)
- Lowest elevation: 163 m (535 ft)
- Population (2023): 149
  - Density: 21.6/km^{2} (56.0/sq mi)
- Time zone: UTC+01:00 (CET)
  - Summer (DST): UTC+02:00 (CEST)
- INSEE/Postal code: 52528 /52130
- ^{1} French Land Register data, which excludes lakes, ponds, glaciers > 1 km^{2} (0.386 sq mi or 247 acres) and river estuaries.

Ville-en-Blaisois (French pronunciation: [vil ɑ̃ blɛzwa]) is a commune in the Haute-Marne department in north-eastern France.

== Geography ==
The river Blaise flows through the commune.

== See also ==
- Communes of the Haute-Marne department
