= Maizières, Haute-Marne =

Maizières
- Commune
- Location of Maizières
- Location within France Location within Grand Est
- Coordinates: 48°29′38″N 5°04′04″E
- Country: France
- Region: Grand Est
- Department: Haute-Marne
- Arrondissement: Saint-Dizier
- Canton: Eurville-Bienville
- Intercommunality: CA Grand Saint-Dizier, Der et Vallées

Government
  - Mayor (2020–2026): Ode Chevaillier
- Area^{1}: 11.7 km^{2} (4.5 sq mi)
- Elevation: 260 m (850 ft)
- Population (2023): 185
  - Density: 15.8/km^{2} (41.0/sq mi)
- Time zone: UTC+01:00 (CET)
  - Summer (DST): UTC+02:00 (CEST)
- INSEE/Postal code: 52302 /52300
- ^{1} French Land Register data, which excludes lakes, ponds, glaciers > 1 km^{2} (0.386 sq mi or 247 acres) and river estuaries.

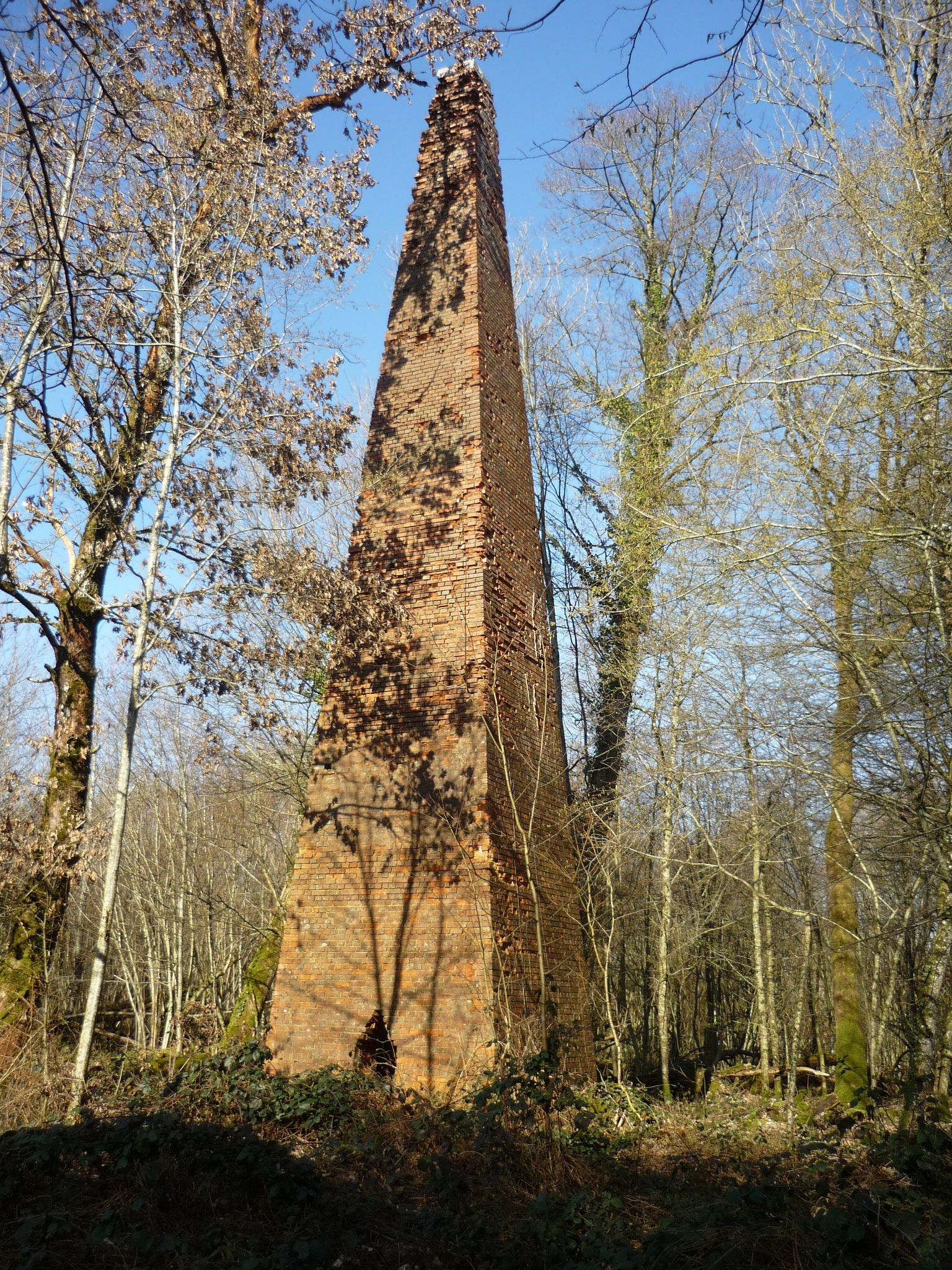
Maizières, Haute-Marne

Maizières (French pronunciation: [mɛzjɛʁ]) is a commune in the Haute-Marne department in north-eastern France.

== See also ==
- Communes of the Haute-Marne department
