= Troisfontaines-la-Ville =

- Commune
- Location of Troisfontaines-la-Ville
- Location within France Location within Grand Est
- Coordinates: 48°32′27″N 5°01′48″E
- Country: France
- Region: Grand Est
- Department: Haute-Marne
- Arrondissement: Saint-Dizier
- Canton: Eurville-Bienville
- Intercommunality: CA Grand Saint-Dizier, Der et Vallées

Government
  - Mayor (2020–2026): Bernard Menaucourt
- Area^{1}: 37.88 km^{2} (14.63 sq mi)
- Elevation: 220 m (720 ft)
- Highest elevation: 276 m (906 ft)
- Lowest elevation: 152 m (499 ft)
- Population (2023): 431
  - Density: 11.4/km^{2} (29.5/sq mi)
- Time zone: UTC+01:00 (CET)
  - Summer (DST): UTC+02:00 (CEST)
- INSEE/Postal code: 52497 /52130
- ^{1} French Land Register data, which excludes lakes, ponds, glaciers > 1 km^{2} (0.386 sq mi or 247 acres) and river estuaries.

Troisfontaines-la-Ville (French pronunciation: [tʁwafɔ̃tɛn la vil]) is a commune in the Haute-Marne department in north-eastern France.

== See also ==
- Communes of the Haute-Marne department
