= Voillecomte =

- Commune
- Location of Voillecomte
- Location within France Location within Grand Est
- Coordinates: 48°30′24″N 4°51′57″E
- Country: France
- Region: Grand Est
- Department: Haute-Marne
- Arrondissement: Saint-Dizier
- Canton: Wassy
- Intercommunality: CA Grand Saint-Dizier, Der et Vallées

Government
  - Mayor (2020–2026): Jean-Paul Huver
- Area^{1}: 14.44 km^{2} (5.58 sq mi)
- Elevation: 160 m (520 ft)
- Highest elevation: 182 m (597 ft)
- Lowest elevation: 132 m (433 ft)
- Population (2023): 522
  - Density: 36.1/km^{2} (93.6/sq mi)
- Time zone: UTC+01:00 (CET)
  - Summer (DST): UTC+02:00 (CEST)
- INSEE/Postal code: 52543 /52130
- ^{1} French Land Register data, which excludes lakes, ponds, glaciers > 1 km^{2} (0.386 sq mi or 247 acres) and river estuaries.

Voillecomte (French pronunciation: [vwajkɔ̃t]) is a commune in the Haute-Marne department in north-eastern France.

== See also ==
- Communes of the Haute-Marne department
