= Brousseval =

- Commune
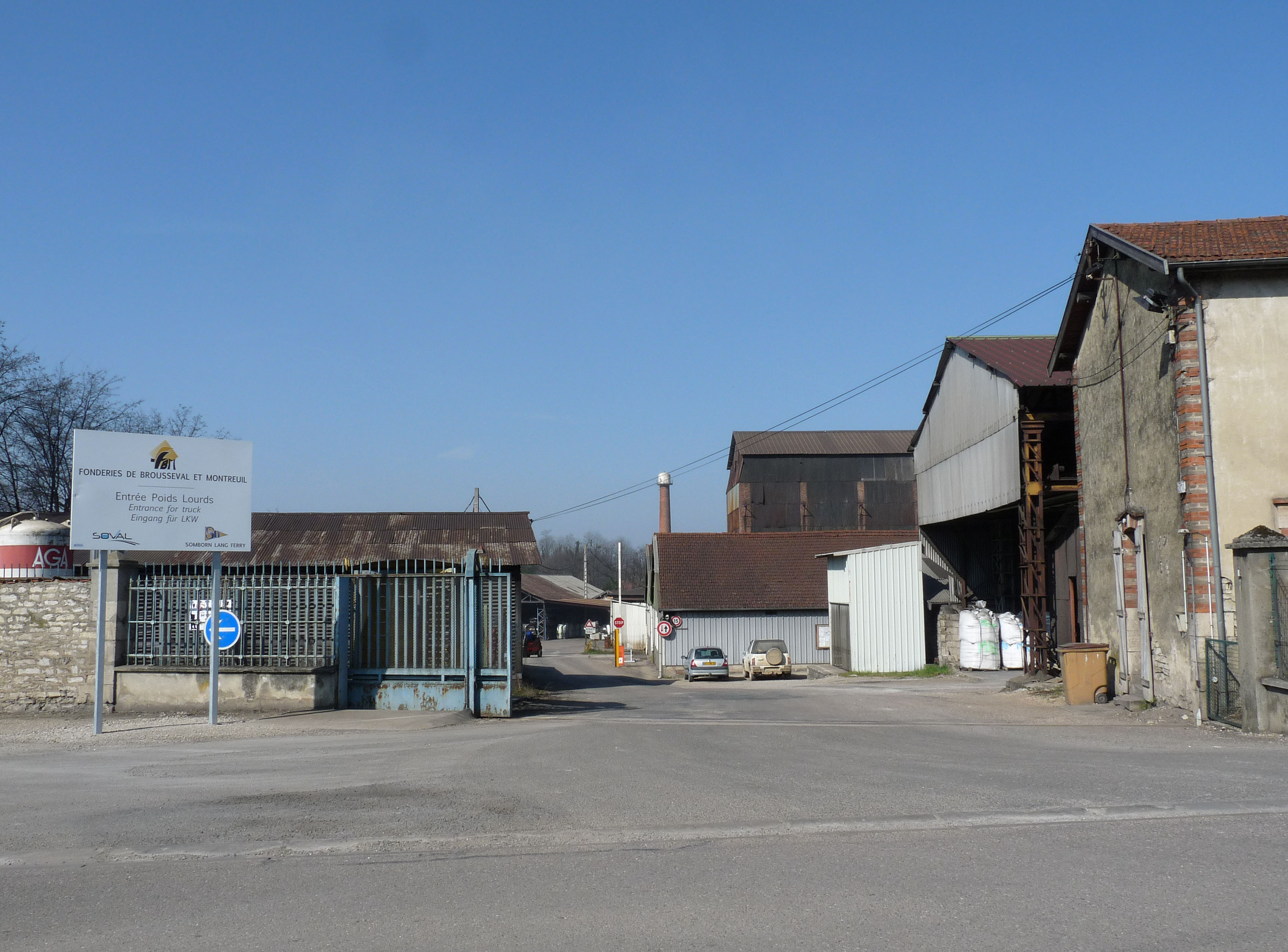
- The foundries in Brousseval
- Location of Brousseval
- Location within France Location within Grand Est
- Coordinates: 48°29′31″N 4°58′04″E
- Country: France
- Region: Grand Est
- Department: Haute-Marne
- Arrondissement: Saint-Dizier
- Canton: Wassy
- Intercommunality: CA Grand Saint-Dizier, Der et Vallées

Government
  - Mayor (2020–2026): Bruno Moite
- Area^{1}: 6.01 km^{2} (2.32 sq mi)
- Elevation: 170 m (560 ft)
- Highest elevation: 237 m (778 ft)
- Lowest elevation: 165 m (541 ft)
- Population (2023): 615
  - Density: 102/km^{2} (265/sq mi)
- Time zone: UTC+01:00 (CET)
  - Summer (DST): UTC+02:00 (CEST)
- INSEE/Postal code: 52079 /52130
- ^{1} French Land Register data, which excludes lakes, ponds, glaciers > 1 km^{2} (0.386 sq mi or 247 acres) and river estuaries.

Brousseval (French pronunciation: [bʁusval]) is a commune in the Haute-Marne department in northeastern France.

== Geography ==
The river Blaise flows through the commune.

== Population ==
Historical population
Year	Pop.	±% p.a.
1968	1,269	—
1975	1,193	−0.88%
1982	1,095	−1.22%
1990	923	−2.11%
1999	832	−1.15%
2007	683	−2.44%
2012	752	+1.94%
2017	694	−1.59%
2023	615	−1.99%
Source: INSEE

== See also ==
- Communes of the Haute-Marne department
