= Bettancourt-la-Ferrée =

- Commune
- Location of Bettancourt-la-Ferrée
- Location within France Location within Grand Est
- Coordinates: 48°39′12″N 4°58′29″E
- Country: France
- Region: Grand Est
- Department: Haute-Marne
- Arrondissement: Saint-Dizier
- Canton: Saint-Dizier-3
- Intercommunality: CA Grand Saint-Dizier, Der et Vallées

Government
  - Mayor (2020–2026): Dominique Laurent
- Area^{1}: 5.38 km^{2} (2.08 sq mi)
- Elevation: 159 m (522 ft)
- Highest elevation: 197 m (646 ft)
- Lowest elevation: 143 m (469 ft)
- Population (2023): 1,802
  - Density: 335/km^{2} (868/sq mi)
- Time zone: UTC+01:00 (CET)
  - Summer (DST): UTC+02:00 (CEST)
- INSEE/Postal code: 52045 /52100
- ^{1} French Land Register data, which excludes lakes, ponds, glaciers > 1 km^{2} (0.386 sq mi or 247 acres) and river estuaries.

Bettancourt-la-Ferrée (French pronunciation: [bɛtɑ̃kuʁ la fɛʁe]) is a commune in the Haute-Marne department in northeastern France.

== Population ==
Historical population
Year	Pop.	±% p.a.
1968	1,113	—
1975	1,843	+7.47%
1982	2,295	+3.18%
1990	2,286	−0.05%
1999	2,041	−1.25%
2007	1,862	−1.14%
2012	1,739	−1.36%
2017	1,697	−0.49%
2023	1,802	+1.01%
Source: INSEE

== See also ==
- Communes of the Haute-Marne department
