= Maurupt-le-Montois =

- Commune
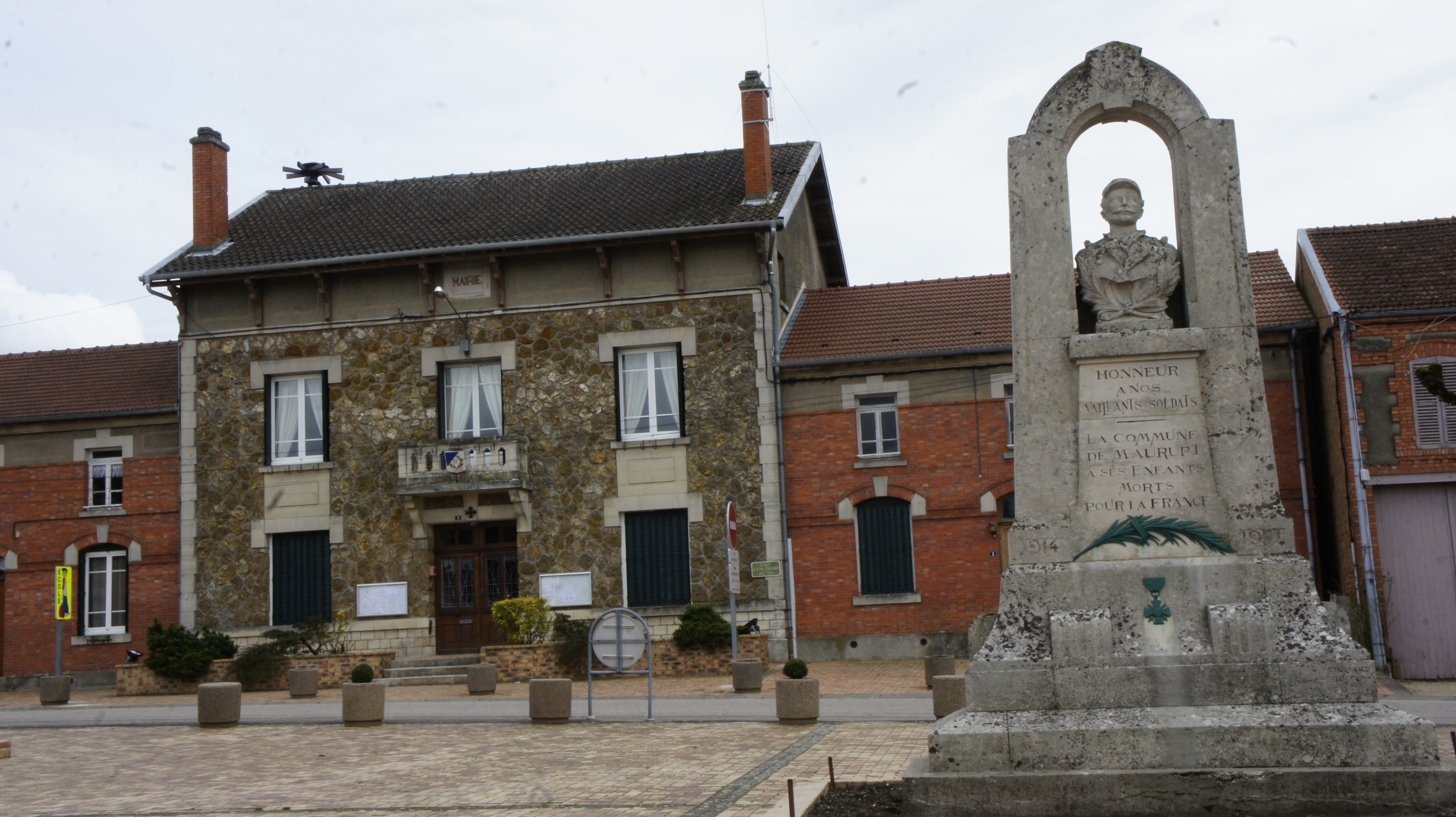
- The town hall in Maurupt-le-Montois

- Coat of arms
- Location of Maurupt-le-Montois
- Location within France Location within Grand Est
- Coordinates: 48°45′00″N 4°50′58″E
- Country: France
- Region: Grand Est
- Department: Marne
- Arrondissement: Vitry-le-François
- Canton: Sermaize-les-Bains
- Intercommunality: CA Grand Saint-Dizier, Der et Vallées

Government
  - Mayor (2020–2026): Jérôme Roussel
- Area^{1}: 18.12 km^{2} (7.00 sq mi)
- Elevation: 144 m (472 ft)
- Population (2023): 511
  - Density: 28.2/km^{2} (73.0/sq mi)
- Time zone: UTC+01:00 (CET)
  - Summer (DST): UTC+02:00 (CEST)
- INSEE/Postal code: 51358 /51340
- ^{1} French Land Register data, which excludes lakes, ponds, glaciers > 1 km^{2} (0.386 sq mi or 247 acres) and river estuaries.

Maurupt-le-Montois (French pronunciation: [moʁy lə mɔ̃twa]) is a commune in the Marne department in north-eastern France.

== See also ==
- Communes of the Marne department
