= Rachecourt-Suzémont =

- Commune
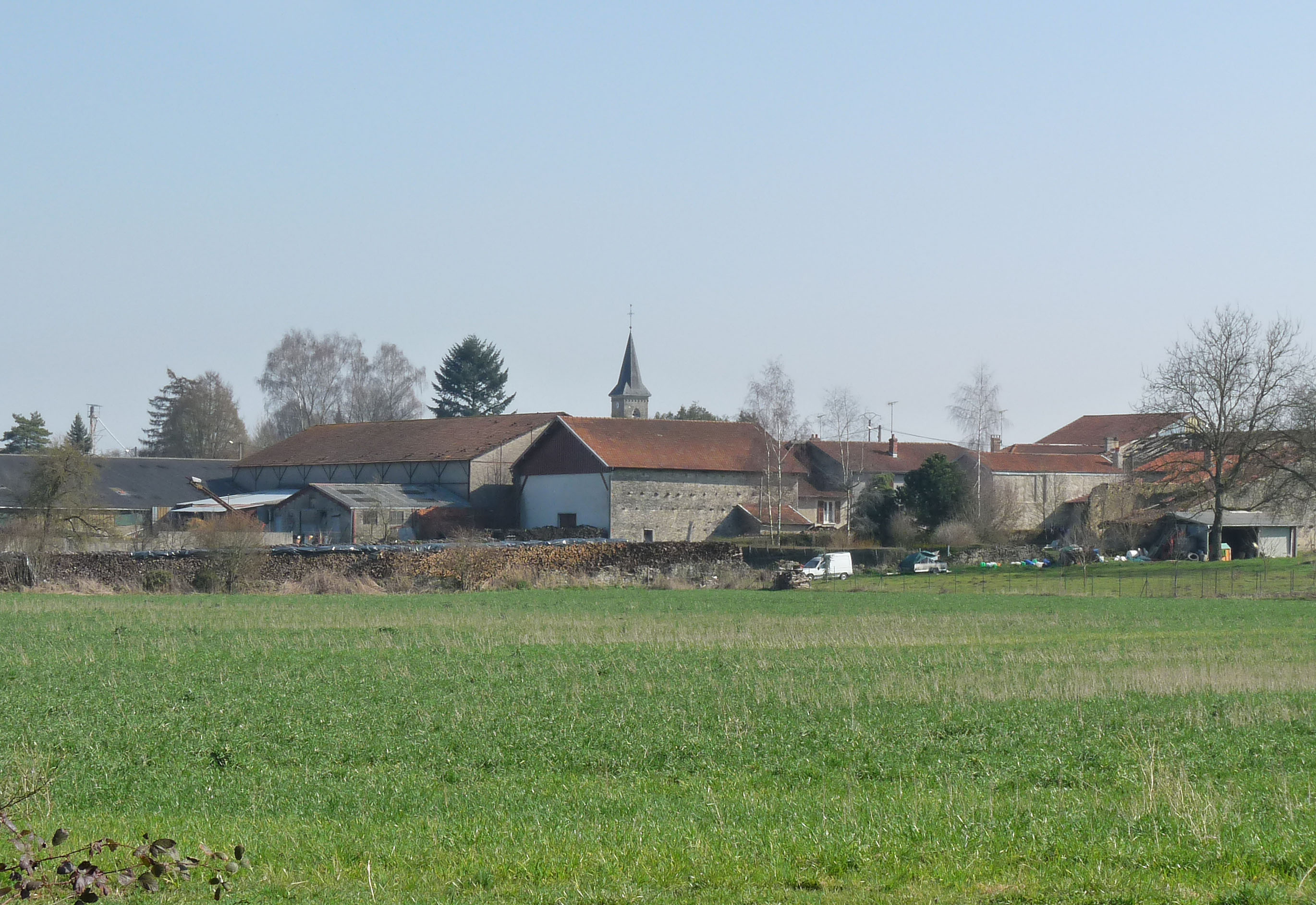
- A general view of Rachecourt-Suzémont
- Location of Rachecourt-Suzémont
- Location within France Location within Grand Est
- Coordinates: 48°27′29″N 4°57′56″E
- Country: France
- Region: Grand Est
- Department: Haute-Marne
- Arrondissement: Saint-Dizier
- Canton: Wassy
- Intercommunality: CA Grand Saint-Dizier, Der et Vallées

Government
  - Mayor (2020–2026): Stéphane Remenant
- Area^{1}: 3.57 km^{2} (1.38 sq mi)
- Elevation: 180 m (590 ft)
- Highest elevation: 240 m (790 ft)
- Lowest elevation: 176 m (577 ft)
- Population (2023): 101
  - Density: 28.3/km^{2} (73.3/sq mi)
- Time zone: UTC+01:00 (CET)
  - Summer (DST): UTC+02:00 (CEST)
- INSEE/Postal code: 52413 /52130
- ^{1} French Land Register data, which excludes lakes, ponds, glaciers > 1 km^{2} (0.386 sq mi or 247 acres) and river estuaries.

Rachecourt-Suzémont (French pronunciation: [ʁaʃkuʁ syzemɔ̃]) is a commune in the Haute-Marne department in north-eastern France.

== Population ==
Historical population
Year	Pop.	±% p.a.
1968	143	—
1975	160	+1.62%
1982	125	−3.47%
1990	95	−3.37%
1999	93	−0.24%
2007	108	+1.89%
2012	110	+0.37%
2017	105	−0.93%
2023	101	−0.65%
Source: INSEE

== Geography ==
The river Blaise flows through the commune.

== See also ==
- Communes of the Haute-Marne department
