= Canton of Saint-Dizier-3 =

Coordinates: 48.65°N 4.97°E

The canton of Saint-Dizier-3 is an administrative division of the Haute-Marne department, northeastern France. It was created at the French canton reorganisation which came into effect in March 2015. Its seat is in Saint-Dizier.

It consists of the following communes:

1. Bettancourt-la-Ferrée
2. Chancenay
3. Saint-Dizier (partly)
