= Rachecourt-sur-Marne =

- Commune
- Location of Rachecourt-sur-Marne
- Location within France Location within Grand Est
- Coordinates: 48°31′36″N 5°06′07″E
- Country: France
- Region: Grand Est
- Department: Haute-Marne
- Arrondissement: Saint-Dizier
- Canton: Eurville-Bienville
- Intercommunality: CA Grand Saint-Dizier, Der et Vallées

Government
  - Mayor (2023–2026): Marie-Laure Parison
- Area^{1}: 5.65 km^{2} (2.18 sq mi)
- Elevation: 173 m (568 ft)
- Population (2023): 739
  - Density: 131/km^{2} (339/sq mi)
- Time zone: UTC+01:00 (CET)
  - Summer (DST): UTC+02:00 (CEST)
- INSEE/Postal code: 52414 /52170
- ^{1} French Land Register data, which excludes lakes, ponds, glaciers > 1 km^{2} (0.386 sq mi or 247 acres) and river estuaries.

Rachecourt-sur-Marne (French pronunciation: [ʁaʃkuʁ syʁ maʁn], literally Rachecourt on Marne) is a commune in the Haute-Marne department in north-eastern France.

== Population ==
Historical population
Year	Pop.	±% p.a.
1968	833	—
1975	887	+0.90%
1982	911	+0.38%
1990	838	−1.04%
1999	760	−1.08%
2007	838	+1.23%
2012	812	−0.63%
2017	779	−0.83%
2023	739	−0.87%
Source: INSEE

== See also ==
- Communes of the Haute-Marne department
