= Chevillon, Haute-Marne =

Chevillon
- Commune
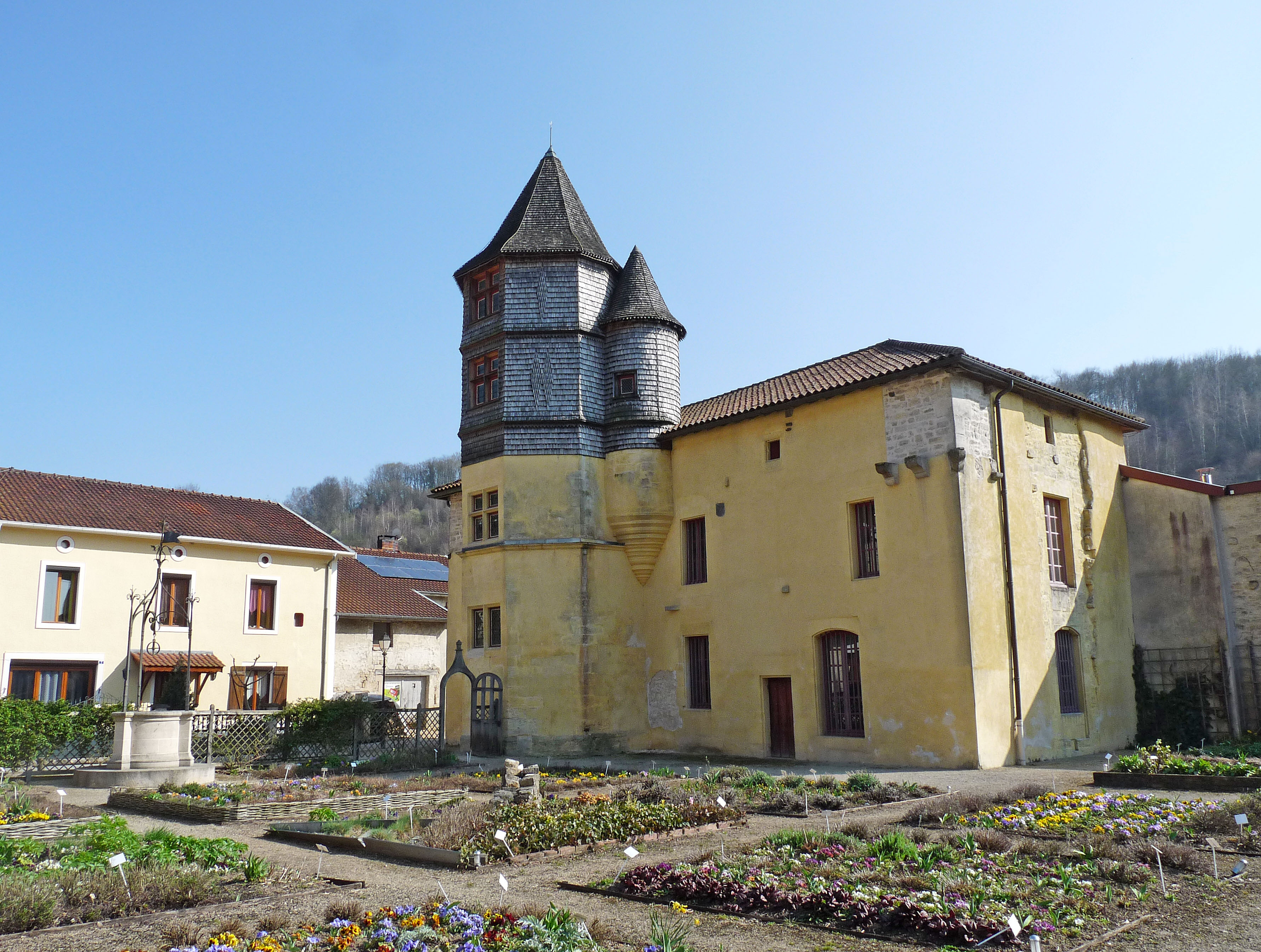
- The chateau in Chevillon

- Coat of arms
- Location of Chevillon
- Location within France Location within Grand Est
- Coordinates: 48°31′46″N 5°07′56″E
- Country: France
- Region: Grand Est
- Department: Haute-Marne
- Arrondissement: Saint-Dizier
- Canton: Eurville-Bienville
- Intercommunality: CA Grand Saint-Dizier, Der et Vallées

Government
  - Mayor (2020–2026): Dominique Mercier
- Area^{1}: 36.9 km^{2} (14.2 sq mi)
- Elevation: 180 m (590 ft)
- Highest elevation: 354 m (1,161 ft)
- Lowest elevation: 162 m (531 ft)
- Population (2023): 1,244
  - Density: 33.7/km^{2} (87.3/sq mi)
- Time zone: UTC+01:00 (CET)
  - Summer (DST): UTC+02:00 (CEST)
- INSEE/Postal code: 52123 /52170
- ^{1} French Land Register data, which excludes lakes, ponds, glaciers > 1 km^{2} (0.386 sq mi or 247 acres) and river estuaries.

Chevillon (French pronunciation: [ʃəvijɔ̃]) is a commune in the Haute-Marne department in north-eastern France.

== See also ==
- Communes of the Haute-Marne department
