= Sommancourt =

- Commune
- Location of Sommancourt
- Location within France Location within Grand Est
- Coordinates: 48°30′16″N 5°02′05″E
- Country: France
- Region: Grand Est
- Department: Haute-Marne
- Arrondissement: Saint-Dizier
- Canton: Eurville-Bienville
- Intercommunality: CA Grand Saint-Dizier, Der et Vallées

Government
  - Mayor (2020–2026): Pascal Guillemin
- Area^{1}: 5.73 km^{2} (2.21 sq mi)
- Elevation: 245 m (804 ft)
- Highest elevation: 267 m (876 ft)
- Lowest elevation: 198 m (650 ft)
- Population (2023): 54
  - Density: 9.4/km^{2} (24/sq mi)
- Time zone: UTC+01:00 (CET)
  - Summer (DST): UTC+02:00 (CEST)
- INSEE/Postal code: 52475 /52130
- ^{1} French Land Register data, which excludes lakes, ponds, glaciers > 1 km^{2} (0.386 sq mi or 247 acres) and river estuaries.

Sommancourt (French pronunciation: [sɔmɑ̃kuʁ]) is a commune in the Haute-Marne department in north-eastern France.

== See also ==
- Communes of the Haute-Marne department
