= Vouillers =

- Commune
- Coat of arms
- Location of Vouillers
- Location within France Location within Grand Est
- Coordinates: 48°40′56″N 4°50′06″E
- Country: France
- Region: Grand Est
- Department: Marne
- Arrondissement: Vitry-le-François
- Canton: Sermaize-les-Bains
- Intercommunality: CA Grand Saint-Dizier, Der et Vallées

Government
  - Mayor (2020–2026): Francis Ladeira
- Area^{1}: 8.28 km^{2} (3.20 sq mi)
- Highest elevation: 151 m (495 ft)
- Lowest elevation: 129 m (423 ft)
- Population (2023): 257
  - Density: 31.0/km^{2} (80.4/sq mi)
- Time zone: UTC+01:00 (CET)
  - Summer (DST): UTC+02:00 (CEST)
- INSEE/Postal code: 51654 /51340
- ^{1} French Land Register data, which excludes lakes, ponds, glaciers > 1 km^{2} (0.386 sq mi or 247 acres) and river estuaries.

Vouillers (French pronunciation: [vuje]) is a commune in the Marne department in north-eastern France.

== See also ==
- Communes of the Marne department
