= Chancenay =

- Commune
- Coat of arms
- Location of Chancenay
- Location within France Location within Grand Est
- Coordinates: 48°40′16″N 4°59′16″E
- Country: France
- Region: Grand Est
- Department: Haute-Marne
- Arrondissement: Saint-Dizier
- Canton: Saint-Dizier-3
- Intercommunality: CA Grand Saint-Dizier, Der et Vallées

Government
  - Mayor (2020–2026): Henri Eychenne
- Area^{1}: 9.86 km^{2} (3.81 sq mi)
- Elevation: 162 m (531 ft)
- Highest elevation: 212 m (696 ft)
- Lowest elevation: 151 m (495 ft)
- Population (2023): 1,003
  - Density: 102/km^{2} (263/sq mi)
- Time zone: UTC+01:00 (CET)
  - Summer (DST): UTC+02:00 (CEST)
- INSEE/Postal code: 52104 /52100
- ^{1} French Land Register data, which excludes lakes, ponds, glaciers > 1 km^{2} (0.386 sq mi or 247 acres) and river estuaries.

Chancenay (French pronunciation: [ʃɑ̃snɛ]) is a commune in the Haute-Marne department in north-eastern France.

== See also ==
- Communes of the Haute-Marne department
