= Bailly-aux-Forges =

- Commune
- Location of Bailly-aux-Forges
- Location within France Location within Grand Est
- Coordinates: 48°27′46″N 4°54′55″E
- Country: France
- Region: Grand Est
- Department: Haute-Marne
- Arrondissement: Saint-Dizier
- Canton: Wassy
- Intercommunality: CA Grand Saint-Dizier, Der et Vallées

Government
  - Mayor (2020–2026): Valérie Bontemps
- Area^{1}: 10.51 km^{2} (4.06 sq mi)
- Elevation: 176 m (577 ft)
- Highest elevation: 211 m (692 ft)
- Lowest elevation: 158 m (518 ft)
- Population (2023): 127
  - Density: 12.1/km^{2} (31.3/sq mi)
- Time zone: UTC+01:00 (CET)
  - Summer (DST): UTC+02:00 (CEST)
- INSEE/Postal code: 52034 /52130
- ^{1} French Land Register data, which excludes lakes, ponds, glaciers > 1 km^{2} (0.386 sq mi or 247 acres) and river estuaries.

Bailly-aux-Forges (French pronunciation: [baji o fɔʁʒ]) is a commune in the Haute-Marne department in the Grand Est region in northeastern France.

== Population ==
Historical population
Year	Pop.	±% p.a.
1968	131	—
1975	133	+0.22%
1982	121	−1.34%
1990	124	+0.31%
1999	126	+0.18%
2007	131	+0.49%
2012	133	+0.30%
2017	143	+1.46%
2023	127	−1.96%
Source: INSEE

== See also ==
- Communes of the Haute-Marne department
