= Canton of Eurville-Bienville =

Canton of France

Coordinates: 48.58°N 5.04°E

The canton of Eurville-Bienville is an administrative division of the Haute-Marne department, northeastern France. It was created at the French canton reorganisation which came into effect in March 2015. Its seat is in Eurville-Bienville.

It consists of the following communes:

1. Bayard-sur-Marne
2. Chamouilley
3. Chevillon
4. Curel
5. Domblain
6. Eurville-Bienville
7. Fays
8. Fontaines-sur-Marne
9. Magneux
10. Maizières
11. Narcy
12. Osne-le-Val
13. Rachecourt-sur-Marne
14. Roches-sur-Marne
15. Sommancourt
16. Troisfontaines-la-Ville
17. Valleret
