= Morancourt =

- Commune
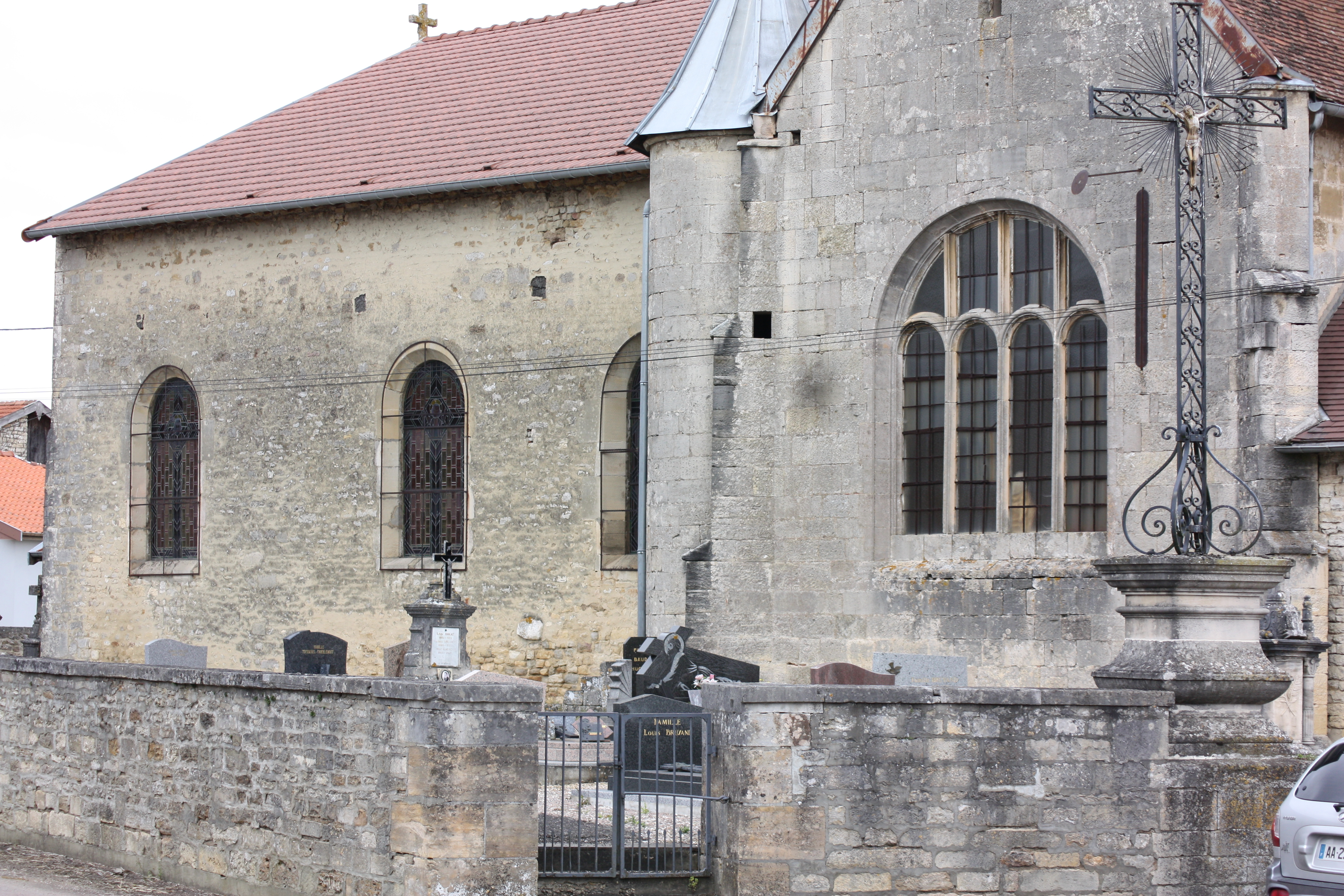
- The church in Morancourt
- Location of Morancourt
- Location within France Location within Grand Est
- Coordinates: 48°25′58″N 5°00′11″E
- Country: France
- Region: Grand Est
- Department: Haute-Marne
- Arrondissement: Saint-Dizier
- Canton: Wassy
- Intercommunality: CA Grand Saint-Dizier, Der et Vallées

Government
  - Mayor (2020–2026): Francis Baudot
- Area^{1}: 13.92 km^{2} (5.37 sq mi)
- Elevation: 250 m (820 ft)
- Highest elevation: 302 m (991 ft)
- Lowest elevation: 212 m (696 ft)
- Population (2023): 126
  - Density: 9.05/km^{2} (23.4/sq mi)
- Time zone: UTC+01:00 (CET)
  - Summer (DST): UTC+02:00 (CEST)
- INSEE/Postal code: 52341 /52110
- ^{1} French Land Register data, which excludes lakes, ponds, glaciers > 1 km^{2} (0.386 sq mi or 247 acres) and river estuaries.

Morancourt (French pronunciation: [mɔʁɑ̃kuʁ]) is a commune in the Haute-Marne department in north-eastern France.

== See also ==
- Communes of the Haute-Marne department
