= Planrupt =

- Commune
- Coat of arms
- Location of Planrupt
- Location within France Location within Grand Est
- Coordinates: 48°30′33″N 4°47′03″E
- Country: France
- Region: Grand Est
- Department: Haute-Marne
- Arrondissement: Saint-Dizier
- Canton: Wassy
- Intercommunality: CA Grand Saint-Dizier, Der et Vallées

Government
  - Mayor (2020–2026): Laurent Clement
- Area^{1}: 8.33 km^{2} (3.22 sq mi)
- Elevation: 130 m (430 ft)
- Highest elevation: 161 m (528 ft)
- Lowest elevation: 123 m (404 ft)
- Population (2023): 307
  - Density: 36.9/km^{2} (95.5/sq mi)
- Time zone: UTC+01:00 (CET)
  - Summer (DST): UTC+02:00 (CEST)
- INSEE/Postal code: 52391 /52220
- ^{1} French Land Register data, which excludes lakes, ponds, glaciers > 1 km^{2} (0.386 sq mi or 247 acres) and river estuaries.

Planrupt (French pronunciation: [plɑ̃ʁy]) is a commune in the Haute-Marne department in north-eastern France.

== See also ==
- Communes of the Haute-Marne department
