= Bayard-sur-Marne =

- Commune
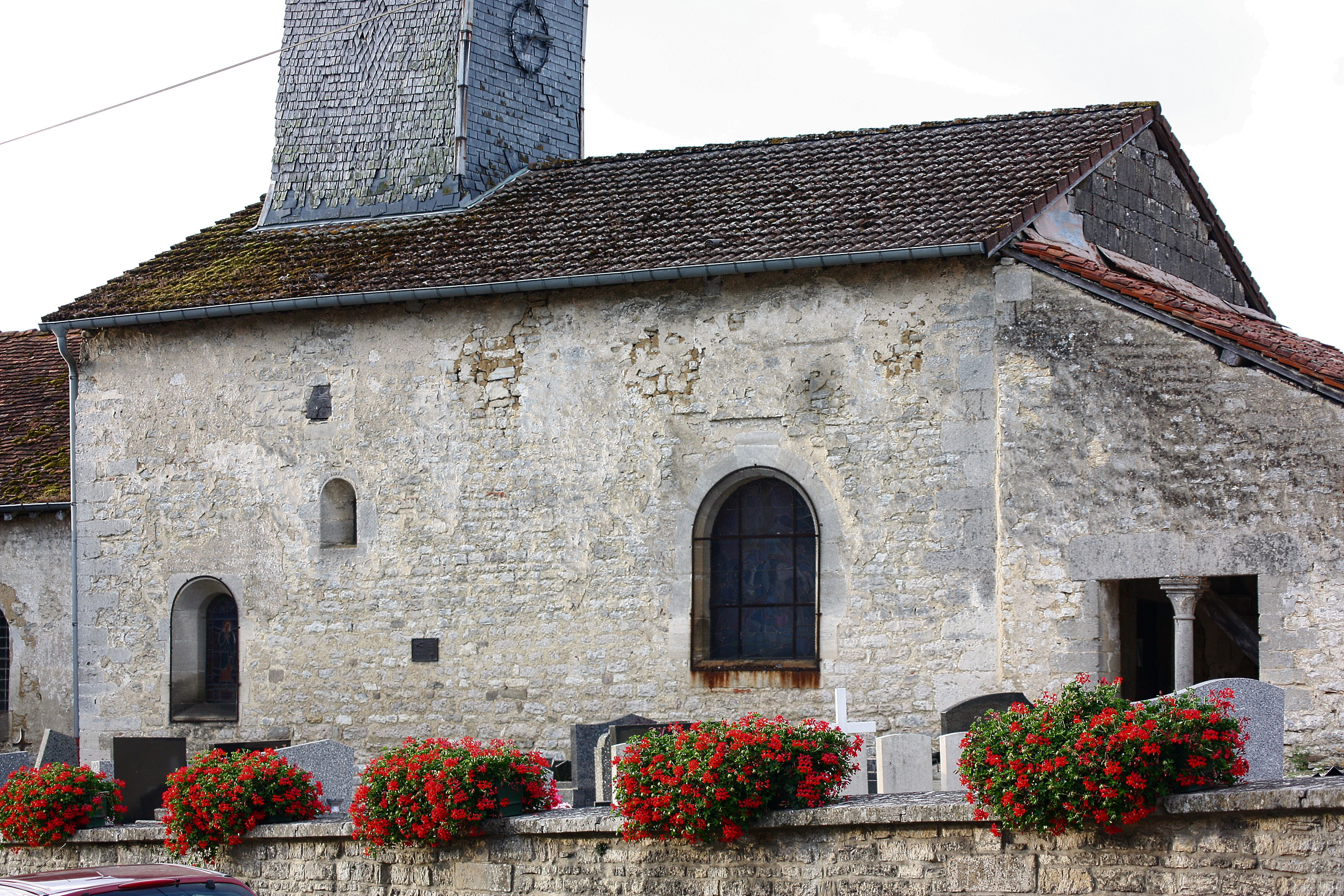
- The church in Prez-sur-Marne

- Coat of arms
- Location of Bayard-sur-Marne
- Location within France Location within Grand Est
- Coordinates: 48°33′18″N 5°04′39″E
- Country: France
- Region: Grand Est
- Department: Haute-Marne
- Arrondissement: Saint-Dizier
- Canton: Eurville-Bienville
- Intercommunality: CA Grand Saint-Dizier, Der et Vallées

Government
  - Mayor (2021–2026): Bruno Prevot
- Area^{1}: 15.39 km^{2} (5.94 sq mi)
- Elevation: 165 m (541 ft)
- Highest elevation: 272 m (892 ft)
- Lowest elevation: 156 m (512 ft)
- Population (2023): 1,260
  - Density: 81.9/km^{2} (212/sq mi)
- Time zone: UTC+01:00 (CET)
  - Summer (DST): UTC+02:00 (CEST)
- INSEE/Postal code: 52265 /52170
- ^{1} French Land Register data, which excludes lakes, ponds, glaciers > 1 km^{2} (0.386 sq mi or 247 acres) and river estuaries.

Bayard-sur-Marne (French pronunciation: [bajaʁ syʁ maʁn], literally Bayard on Marne) is a commune in the Haute-Marne department in the Grand Est region in northeastern France. The commune was formed in 1973 by the merger of the former communes Laneuville-à-Bayard, Gourzon and Prez-sur-Marne.

== Population ==
Historical population
Year	Pop.	±% p.a.
1968	1,788	—
1975	1,640	−1.23%
1982	1,497	−1.29%
1990	1,622	+1.01%
1999	1,518	−0.73%
2007	1,508	−0.08%
2012	1,401	−1.46%
2017	1,322	−1.15%
2023	1,260	−0.80%
Source: INSEE

== See also ==
- Communes of the Haute-Marne department
