= Canton of Wassy =

Coordinates: 48.50°N 4.95°E

The canton of Wassy is an administrative division of the Haute-Marne department, northeastern France. Its borders were modified at the French canton reorganisation which came into effect in March 2015. Its seat is in Wassy.

It consists of the following communes:

1. Attancourt
2. Bailly-aux-Forges
3. Brousseval
4. Ceffonds
5. Dommartin-le-Franc
6. Doulevant-le-Petit
7. Frampas
8. Laneuville-à-Rémy
9. Montreuil-sur-Blaise
10. Morancourt
11. Planrupt
12. La Porte du Der
13. Rachecourt-Suzémont
14. Rives-Dervoises
15. Sommevoire
16. Thilleux
17. Vaux-sur-Blaise
18. Ville-en-Blaisois
19. Voillecomte
20. Wassy
