= Thilleux =

- Commune
- Location of Thilleux
- Location within France Location within Grand Est
- Coordinates: 48°26′24″N 4°48′09″E
- Country: France
- Region: Grand Est
- Department: Haute-Marne
- Arrondissement: Saint-Dizier
- Canton: Wassy
- Intercommunality: CA Grand Saint-Dizier, Der et Vallées

Government
  - Mayor (2023–2026): Jean-Pierre Collin
- Area^{1}: 9.71 km^{2} (3.75 sq mi)
- Elevation: 145 m (476 ft)
- Highest elevation: 174 m (571 ft)
- Lowest elevation: 133 m (436 ft)
- Population (2023): 61
  - Density: 6.3/km^{2} (16/sq mi)
- Time zone: UTC+01:00 (CET)
  - Summer (DST): UTC+02:00 (CEST)
- INSEE/Postal code: 52487 /52220
- ^{1} French Land Register data, which excludes lakes, ponds, glaciers > 1 km^{2} (0.386 sq mi or 247 acres) and river estuaries.

Thilleux (French pronunciation: [tijø]) is a commune in the Haute-Marne department in north-eastern France.

== Hydrography ==
The commune is located in the hydrographic region "the Seine from its source to the confluence with the Oise (excluded)" within the Seine-Normandie basin. It is drained by the Voire, the Ceffondet, the Combe Ditch 01, the Grève Ditch 01, the Punaisots Ditch 01, and the Voyeu du Tertre Ditch 01.

The Voire, 56 km long, rises in the commune of Dommartin-le-Franc and flows into the Aube on its right bank at Molins-sur-Aube, after crossing 21 communes.

== See also ==
- Communes of the Haute-Marne department
