= Eurville-Bienville =

- Commune
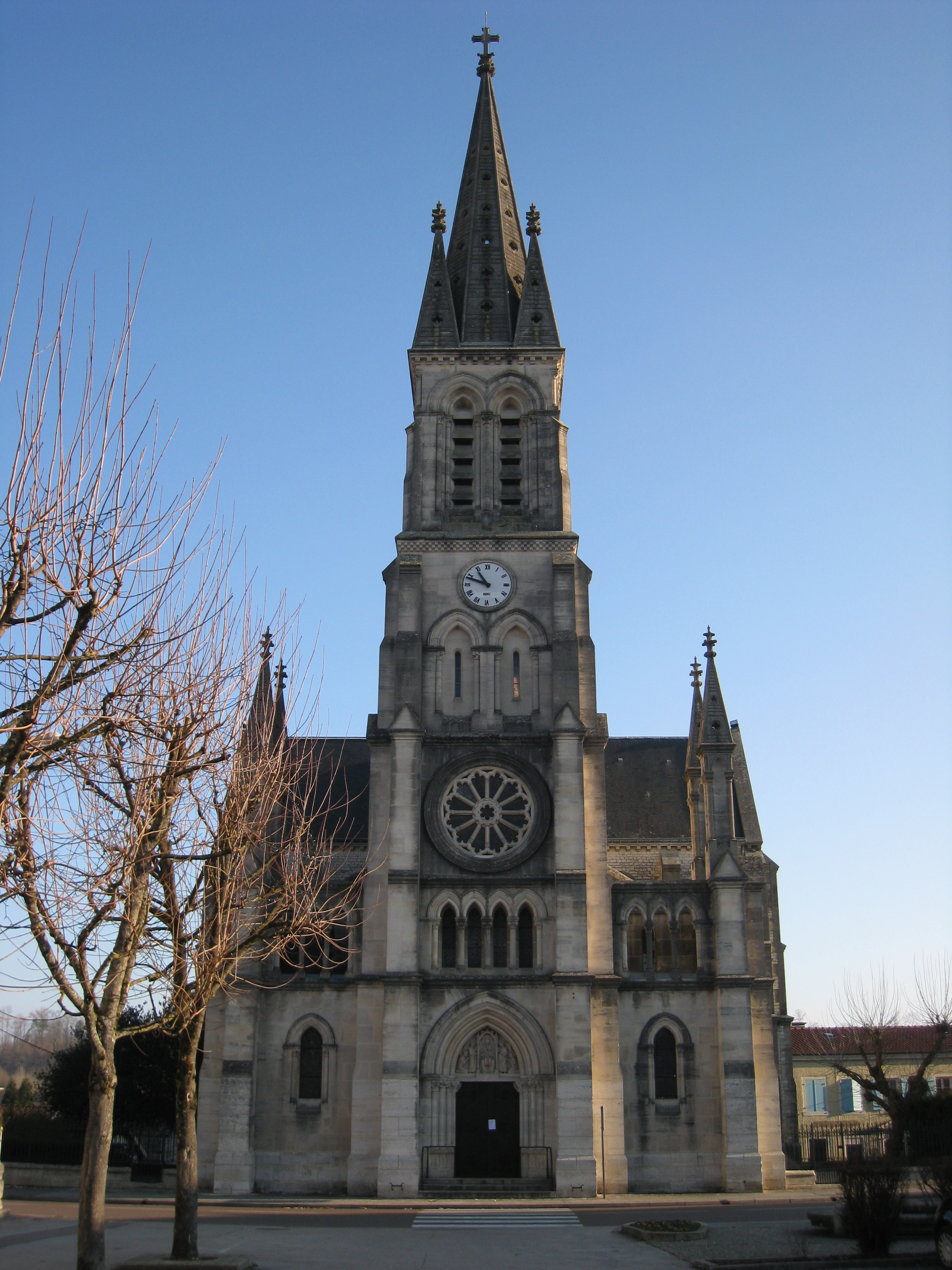
- The church in Eurville
- Location of Eurville-Bienville
- Location within France Location within Grand Est
- Coordinates: 48°35′09″N 5°02′14″E
- Country: France
- Region: Grand Est
- Department: Haute-Marne
- Arrondissement: Saint-Dizier
- Canton: Eurville-Bienville
- Intercommunality: CA Grand Saint-Dizier, Der et Vallées

Government
  - Mayor (2020–2026): Virginie Gerevic
- Area^{1}: 20.73 km^{2} (8.00 sq mi)
- Elevation: 159 m (522 ft)
- Highest elevation: 242 m (794 ft)
- Lowest elevation: 152 m (499 ft)
- Population (2023): 1,974
  - Density: 95.22/km^{2} (246.6/sq mi)
- Time zone: UTC+01:00 (CET)
  - Summer (DST): UTC+02:00 (CEST)
- INSEE/Postal code: 52194 /52410
- ^{1} French Land Register data, which excludes lakes, ponds, glaciers > 1 km^{2} (0.386 sq mi or 247 acres) and river estuaries.

Eurville-Bienville (French pronunciation: [œʁvil bjɛ̃vil]) is a commune in the Haute-Marne department in north-eastern France. The commune was formed in 1972 by the merger of the former communes Eurville and Bienville, located on opposite banks of the river Marne.

== History ==
The village of Bienville has existed from the 5th century. St. Menehould would have died there in 490 (a chapel marks the presumed location of the house where she would have ended his life), but the first reference is from 1167.

Eurville and Bienville have been separated by a boundary during centuries. Between the two villages passed the "Ditch of France", created by the Treaty of Verdun in 843. Eurville was in Francie and Bienville in Lorraine. Stones posts marking the boundaries are still visible. This boundary has even been restored by the Germans during the Second World War.

In feudal times, Eurville depended on the lord of Dampierre Saint-Dizier, Count of Champagne and the kingdom of France.

There are traces of the village of Eurville in 1233: Guillaume de Dampierre, Seigneur de Saint-Dizier, had usurped half the income of the Abbey of Saint-Urbain in appropriating the serfs of Eurville, Bienville, Prez, Chamouilley.

In 1551, Eurville passed into the hands of Baron de Joinville.

Eurville merged with Bienville in May 1972.

== Population ==
Historical population
Year	Pop.	±% p.a.
1968	2,217	—
1975	2,275	+0.37%
1982	2,327	+0.32%
1990	2,086	−1.36%
1999	2,083	−0.02%
2007	2,052	−0.19%
2012	2,104	+0.50%
2017	2,065	−0.37%
2023	1,974	−0.75%
Source: INSEE

== See also ==
- Communes of the Haute-Marne department
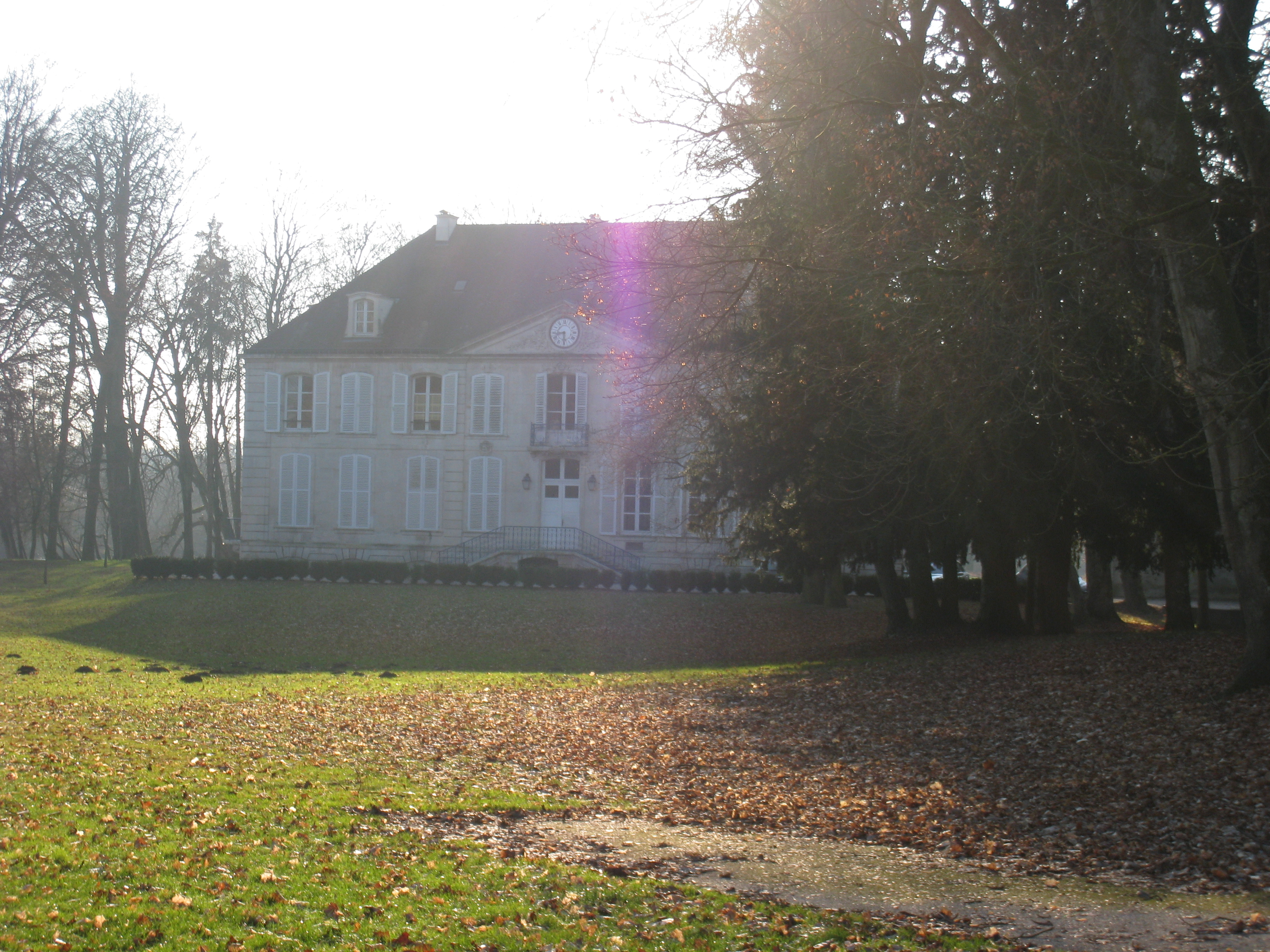
Eurville castle

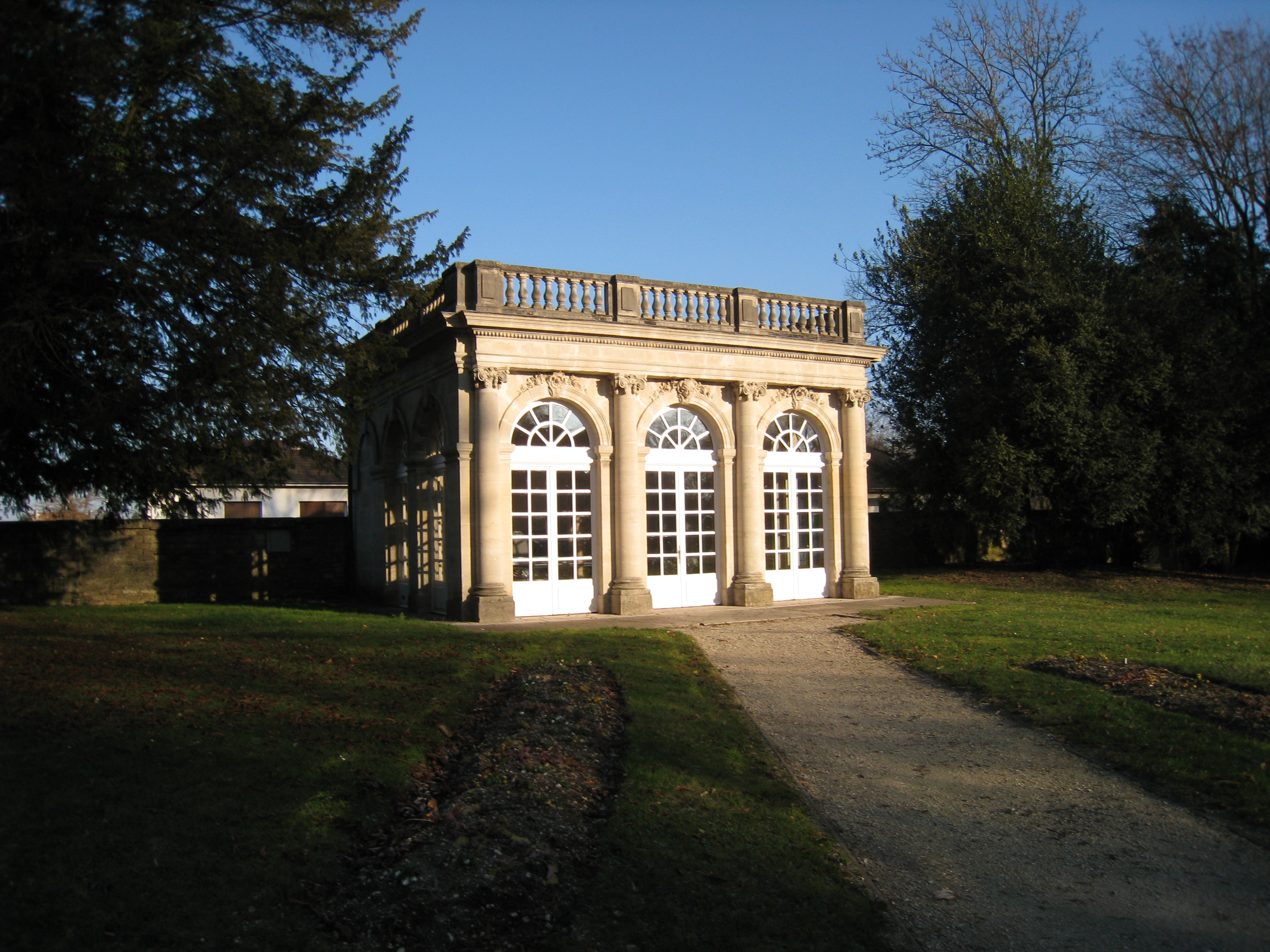
Orangerie of Eurville castle

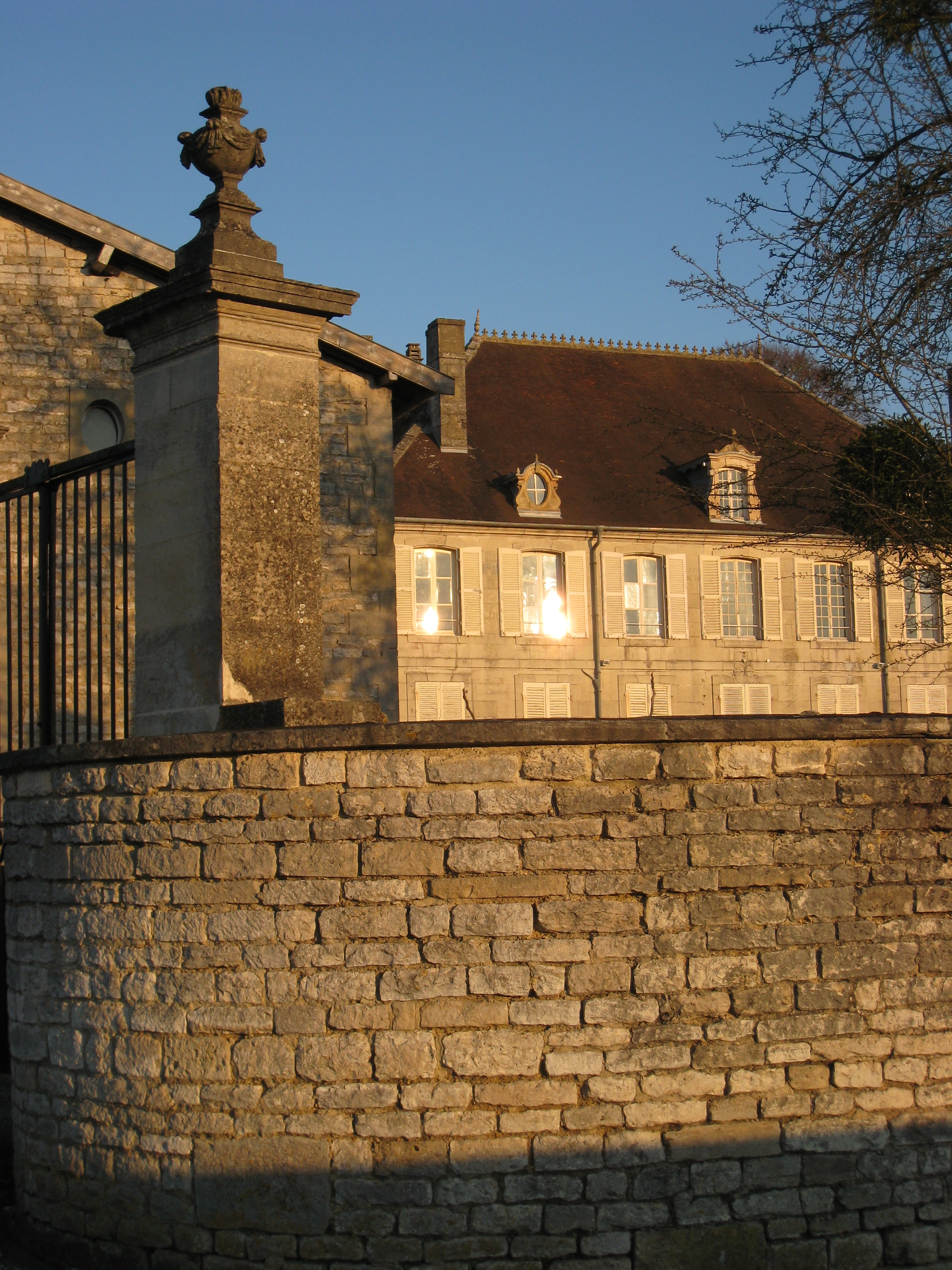
Bienville castle

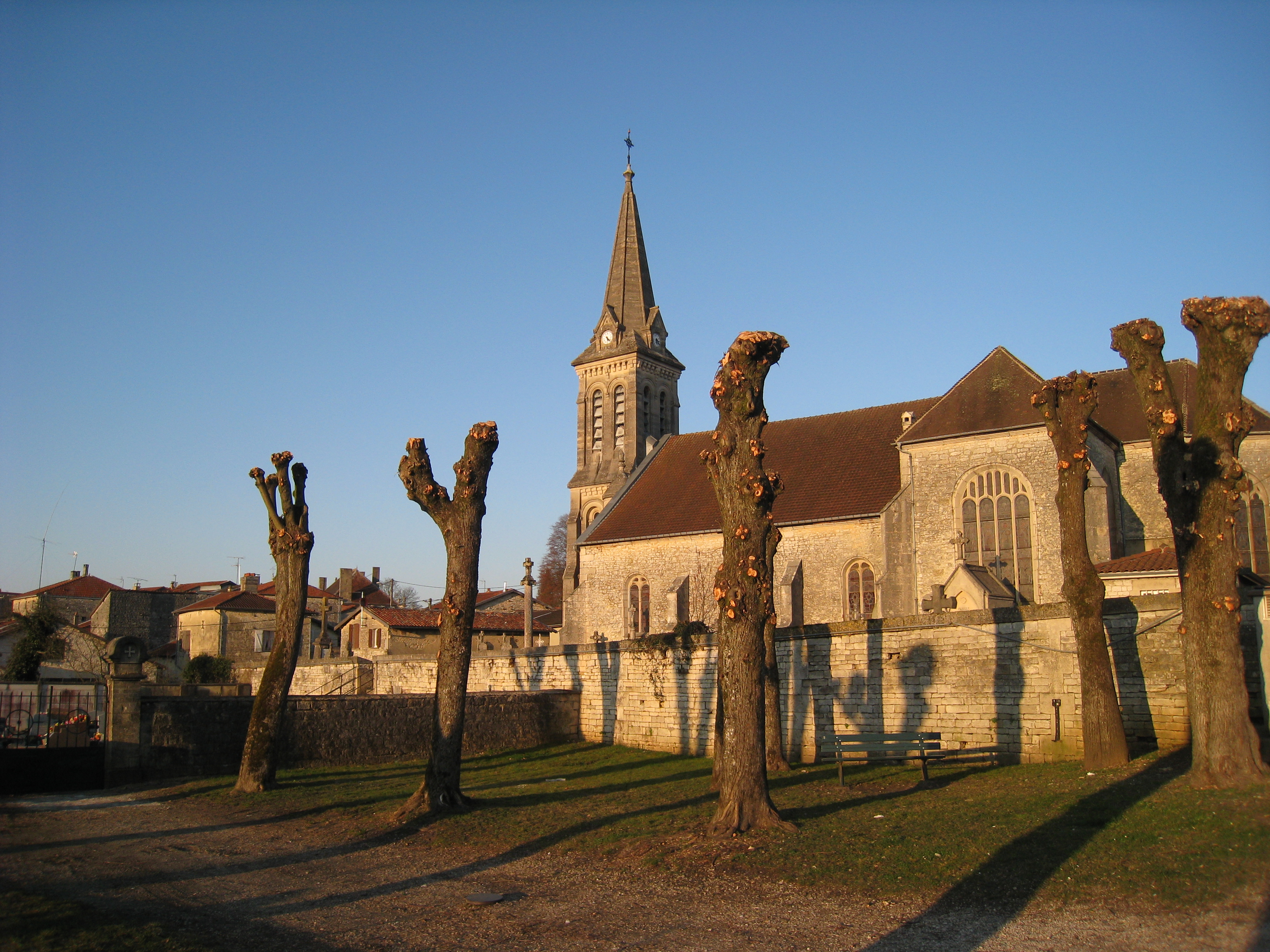
Bienville church
