= Magneux, Haute-Marne =

Magneux
- Commune
- Location of Magneux
- Location within France Location within Grand Est
- Coordinates: 48°30′51″N 5°00′20″E
- Country: France
- Region: Grand Est
- Department: Haute-Marne
- Arrondissement: Saint-Dizier
- Canton: Eurville-Bienville
- Intercommunality: CA Grand Saint-Dizier, Der et Vallées

Government
  - Mayor (2020–2026): Laurence Marcyan
- Area^{1}: 5.8 km^{2} (2.2 sq mi)
- Elevation: 230 m (750 ft)
- Highest elevation: 244 m (801 ft)
- Lowest elevation: 181 m (594 ft)
- Population (2023): 150
  - Density: 26/km^{2} (67/sq mi)
- Time zone: UTC+01:00 (CET)
  - Summer (DST): UTC+02:00 (CEST)
- INSEE/Postal code: 52300 /52130
- ^{1} French Land Register data, which excludes lakes, ponds, glaciers > 1 km^{2} (0.386 sq mi or 247 acres) and river estuaries.

Magneux (French pronunciation: [maɲø]) is a commune in Haute-Marne, a department in northeastern France.

== See also ==
- Communes of the Haute-Marne department
