= Communauté de communes de la Vallée d'Auge =

Vallée d'Auge
- Former communauté de communes
- Country: France
- Region: Normandy
- Department: Calvados
- No. of communes: {{{nbcomm}}}
- Established: 2002
- Disbanded: 2017
- Area: 154.44 km^{2} (59.63 sq mi)
- Population (1999): 11,310
  - Density: 73.23/km^{2} (189.7/sq mi)

The Communauté de communes de la Vallée d'Auge is a former communauté de communes in the Calvados département and in the Normandy région of France. It was created in January 2002. It was merged into the new Communauté d'agglomération Lisieux Normandie in January 2017.

== Composition ==
This Communauté de communes comprised 20 communes:

1. Les Authieux-Papion
2. Biéville-Quétiéville
3. Bissières
4. Castillon-en-Auge
5. Condé-sur-Ifs
6. Coupesarte
7. Crèvecœur-en-Auge
8. Croissanville
9. Grandchamp-le-Château
10. Lécaude
11. Magny-la-Campagne
12. Magny-le-Freule
13. Méry-Corbon
14. Le Mesnil-Mauger
15. Mézidon-Canon
16. Monteille
17. Percy-en-Auge
18. Saint-Julien-le-Faucon
19. Saint-Loup-de-Fribois
20. Vieux-Fumé

== See also ==
- Communes of the Calvados department
