= Magny =

Magny (pro. mah-NJEE) is the name or part of the name of the following communes in France:

- Magny, Eure-et-Loir, in the Eure-et-Loir department
- Magny, Haut-Rhin, in the Haut-Rhin department
- Magny, Yonne, in the Yonne department
- Magny-Châtelard, in the Doubs department
- Magny-Cours, in the Nièvre department
- Magny-Danigon, in the Haute-Saône department
- Magny-en-Bessin, in the Calvados department
- Magny-en-Vexin, in the Val-d'Oise department
- Magny-Fouchard, in the Aube department
- Magny-Jobert, in the Haute-Saône department
- Magny-la-Campagne, in the Calvados department
- Magny-la-Fosse, in the Aisne department
- Magny-Lambert, in the Côte-d'Or department
- Magny-la-Ville, in the Côte-d'Or department
- Magny-le-Désert, in the Orne department
- Magny-le-Freule, in the Calvados department
- Magny-le-Hongre, in the Seine-et-Marne department
- Magny-lès-Aubigny, in the Côte-d'Or department
- Magny-les-Hameaux, in the Yvelines department
- Magny-lès-Jussey, in the Haute-Saône department
- Magny-lès-Villers, in the Côte-d'Or department
- Magny-Lormes, in the Nièvre department
- Magny-Montarlot, in the Côte-d'Or department
- Magny-Saint-Médard, in the Côte-d'Or department
- Magny-sur-Tille, in the Côte-d'Or department
- Magny-Vernois, in the Haute-Saône department
- Hyèvre-Magny, in the Doubs department
- Robert-Magny-Laneuville-à-Rémy, in the Haute-Marne department
- Vincy-Reuil-et-Magny, in the Aisne department
