= Les Authieux-Papion =

- Part of Mézidon Vallée d'Auge
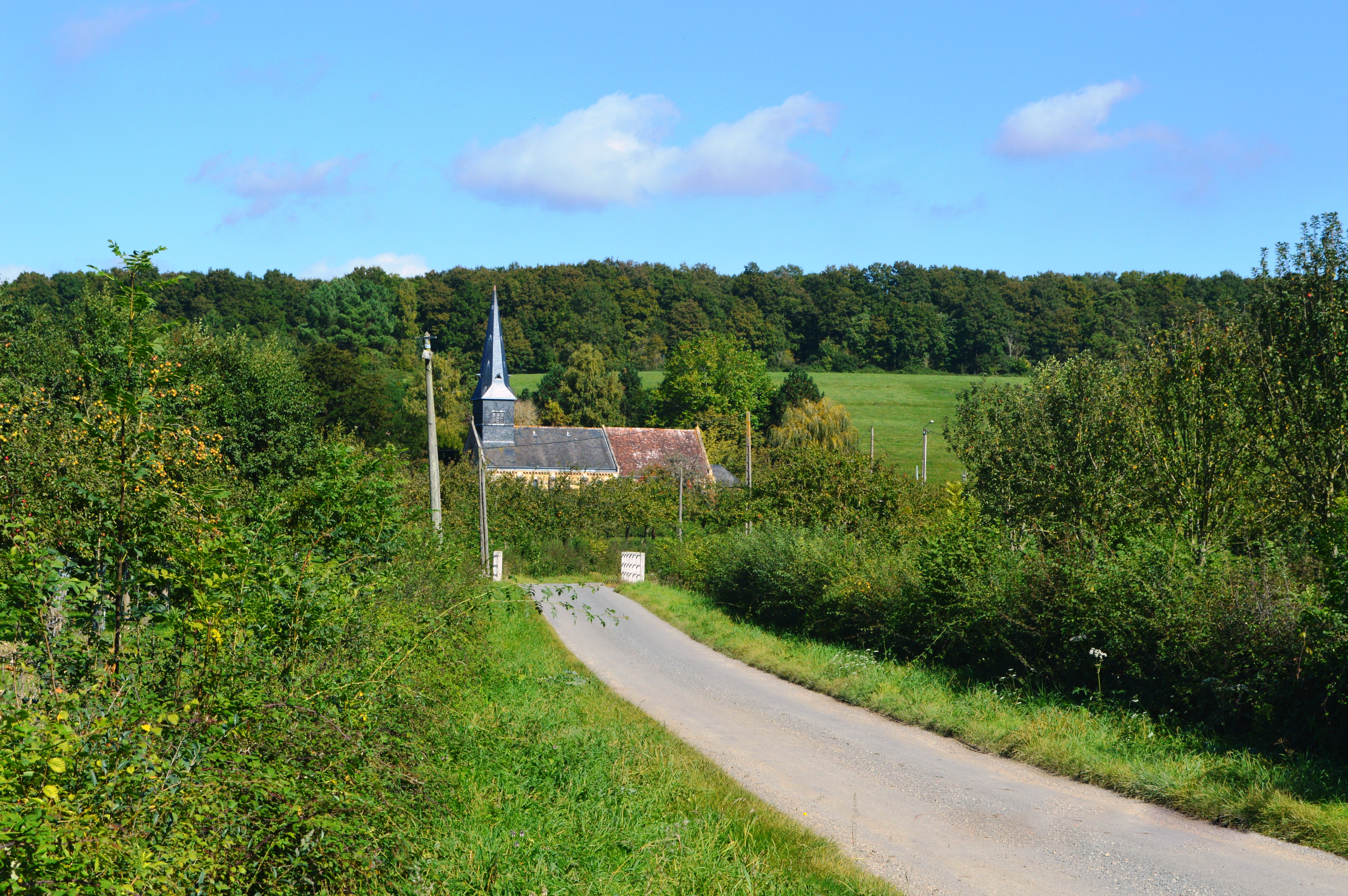
- Location of Les Authieux-Papion
- Location within France Location within Normandy
- Coordinates: 49°03′57″N 0°03′14″E
- Country: France
- Region: Normandy
- Department: Calvados
- Arrondissement: Lisieux
- Canton: Mézidon Vallée d'Auge
- Commune: Mézidon Vallée d'Auge
- Area^{1}: 4.28 km^{2} (1.65 sq mi)
- Elevation: 59 m (194 ft)
- Highest elevation: 79 m (259 ft)
- Lowest elevation: 30 m (98 ft)
- Population (2022): 77
  - Density: 18/km^{2} (47/sq mi)
- Time zone: UTC+01:00 (CET)
  - Summer (DST): UTC+02:00 (CEST)
- Postal code: 14140
- ^{1} French Land Register data, which excludes lakes, ponds, glaciers > 1 km^{2} (0.386 sq mi or 247 acres) and river estuaries.

Les Authieux-Papion (French pronunciation: [le.z‿otjø papjɔ̃]) is a former commune in the Calvados department in the Normandy region of north-western France. On 1 January 2017, it was merged into the new commune Mézidon Vallée d'Auge.

== Geography ==
Les Authieux-Papion is located some 14 km south-west of Lisieux and 11 km north-east of Saint-Pierre-sur-Dives. The D47 road runs along the northern border of the commune from Mézidon-Canon in the west to join the D511 which runs down the eastern border of the commune from Saint-Julien-le-Faucon in the north-east to Saint-Pierre-sur-Dives in the south-west. Access to the village is by local roads off these two roads. There is a large forest towards the south (the Bois des Authieux) and another large forest in the north with the rest of the commune farmland.

The Viette river flows through the centre of the commune from east to west as it flows west then north to join the Vie at Le Mesnil-Mauger.

== Administration ==
List of Successive Mayors

From	To	Name
1979	2017	Jean-Pierre Perthuis

== Demography ==
Historical population

Year	Pop.	±% p.a.
1793	222	—
1800	235	+0.82%
1806	203	−2.41%
1821	187	−0.55%
1831	178	−0.49%
1836	182	+0.45%
1841	183	+0.11%
1846	177	−0.66%
1851	161	−1.88%
1856	134	−3.60%
1861	140	+0.88%
1866	133	−1.02%
1872	130	−0.38%
1876	116	−2.81%
1881	145	+4.56%
1886	122	−3.40%
1891	117	−0.83%
1896	102	−2.71%

Year	Pop.	±% p.a.
1901	95	−1.41%
1906	90	−1.08%
1911	95	+1.09%
1921	116	+2.02%
1926	110	−1.06%
1931	88	−4.36%
1936	71	−4.20%
1946	78	+0.94%
1954	116	+5.09%
1962	94	−2.59%
1968	78	−3.06%
1975	78	+0.00%
1982	61	−3.45%
1990	53	−1.74%
1999	60	+1.39%
2007	67	+1.39%
2012	70	+0.88%
2022	77	+0.96%

Source: EHESS and INSEE

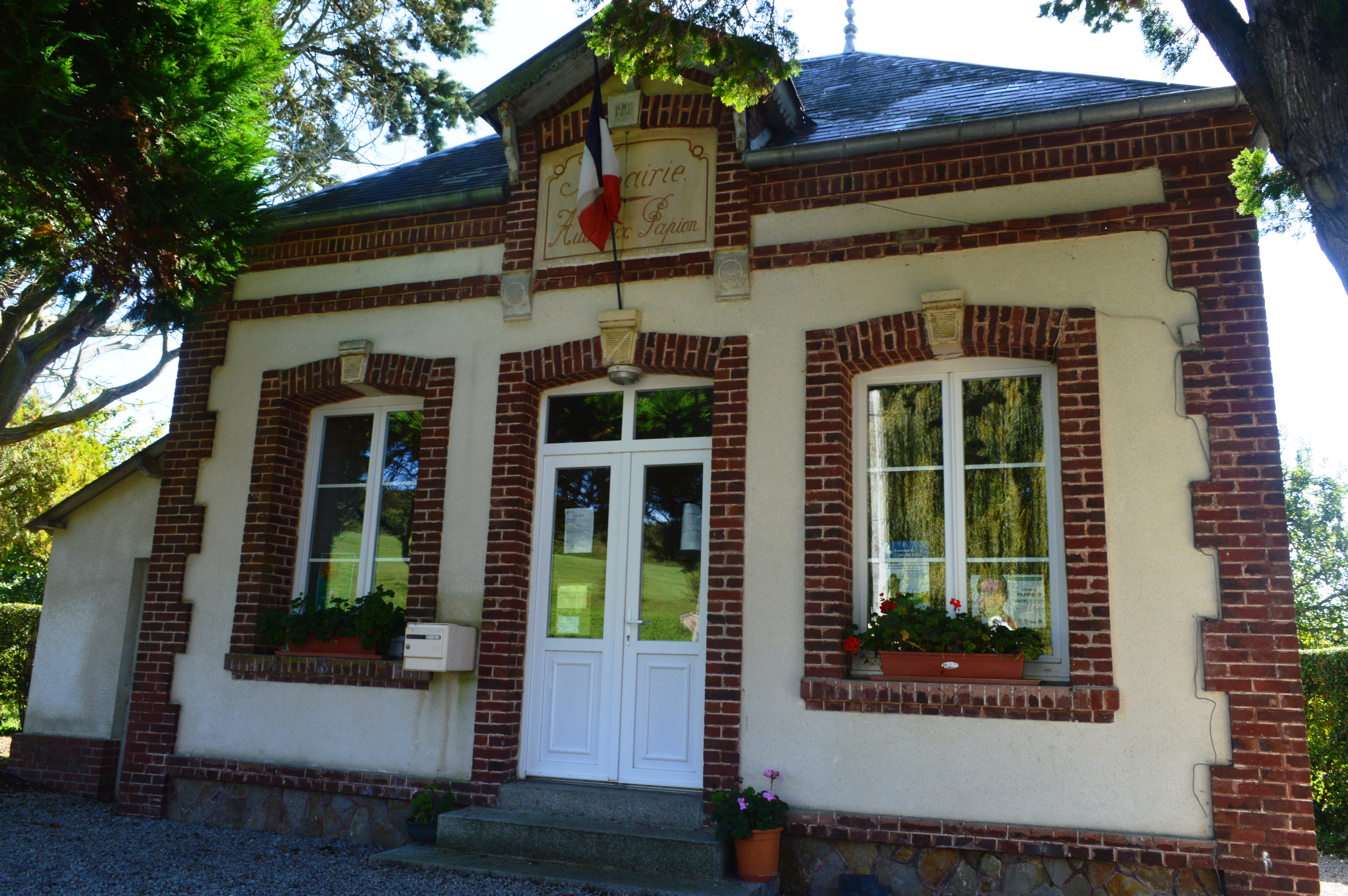
The Town Hall

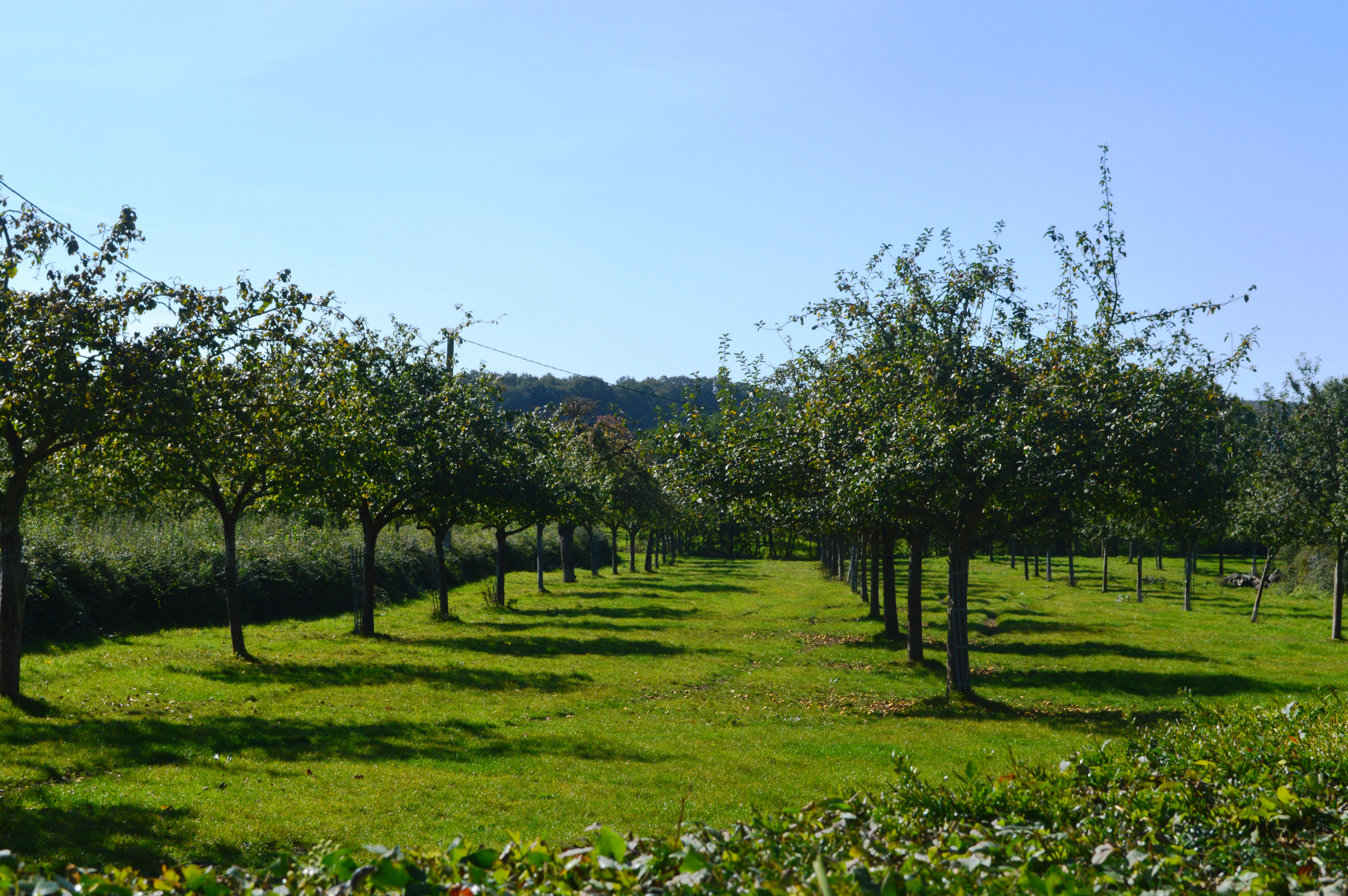
Apple Trees

== Sites and monuments ==
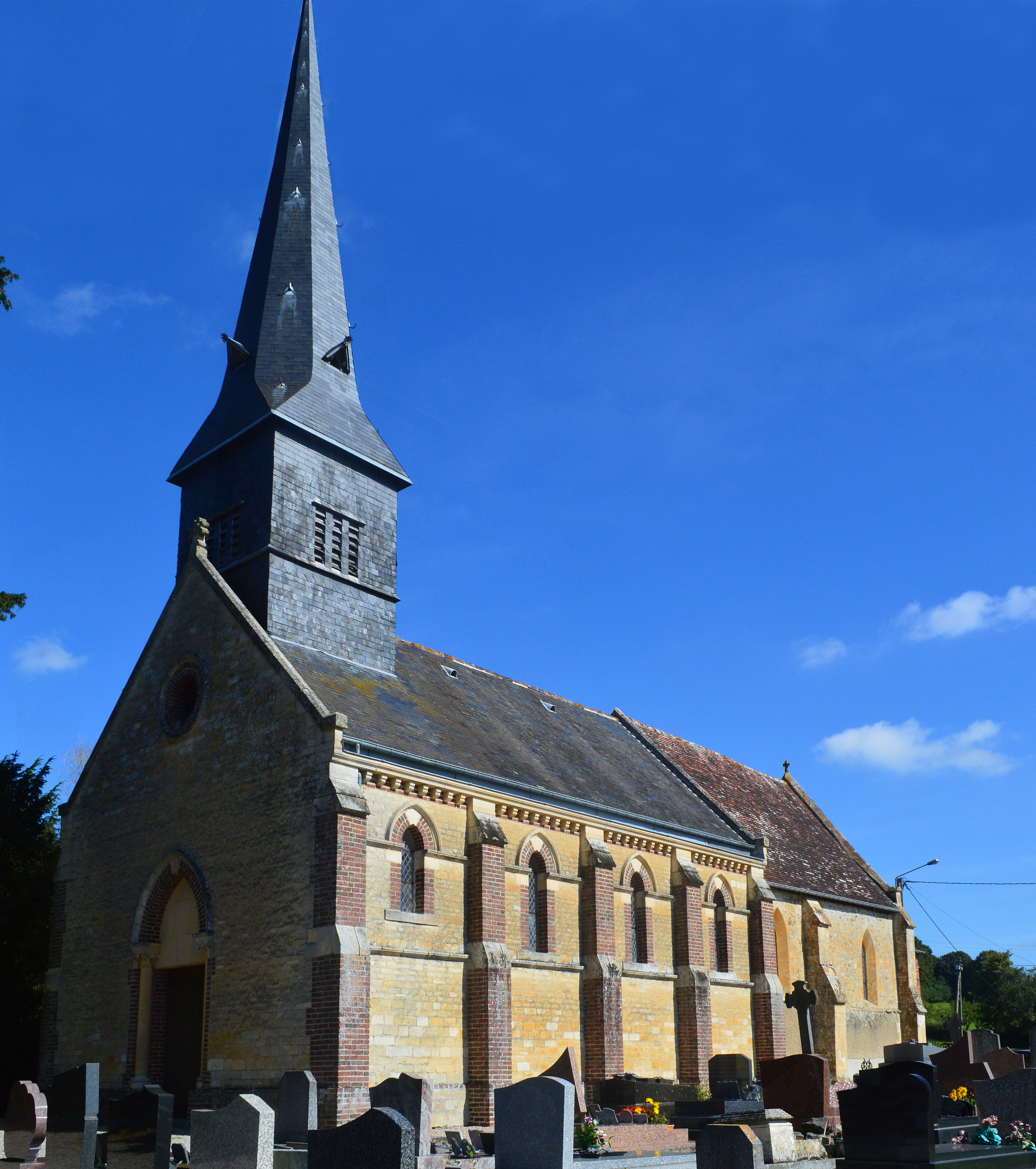
The Church of Saint Philbert

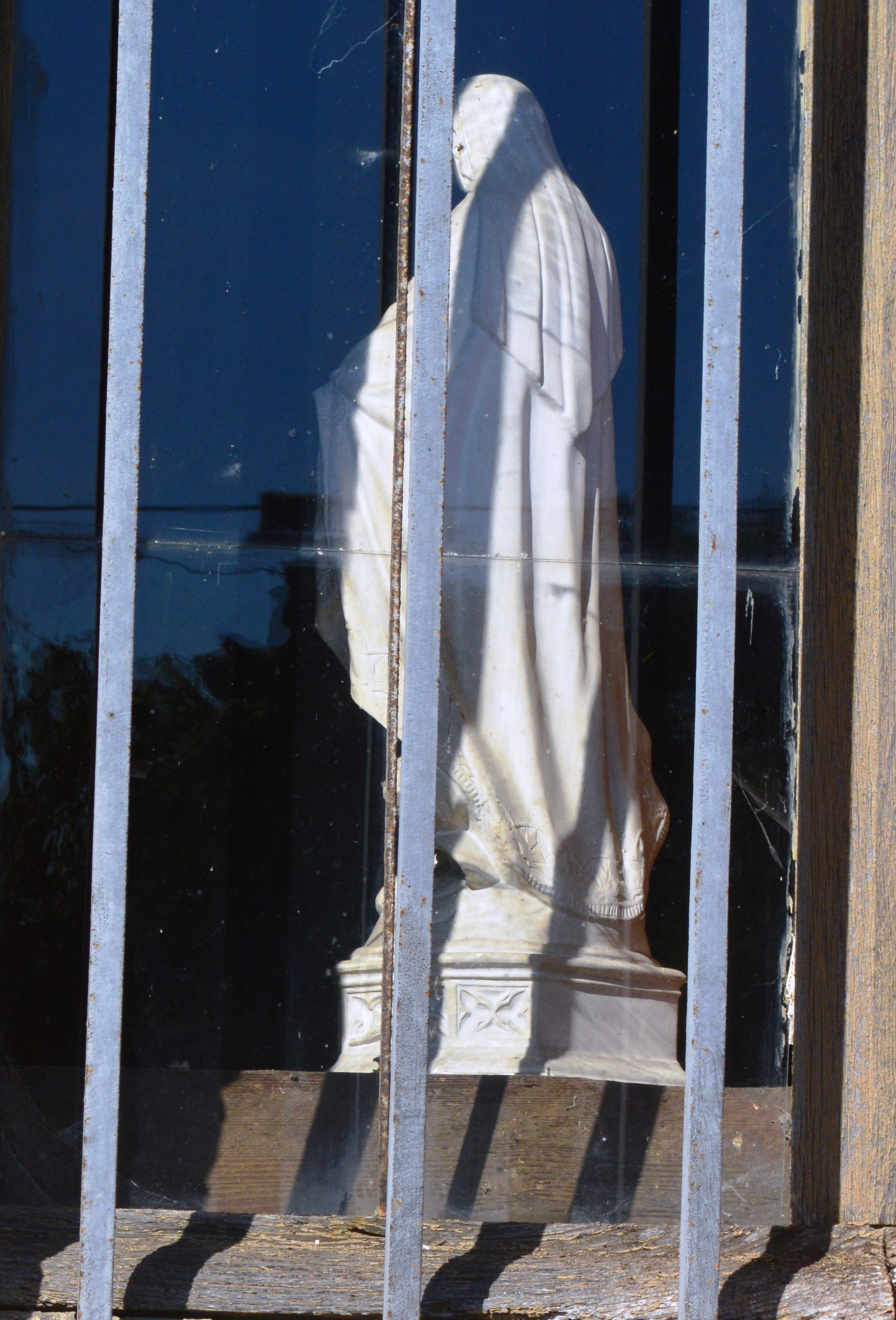
The Statue of the Virgin and child

In the Parish Church of Saint-Philbert there is a Statue: Virgin and child (15th century) which is registered as an historical object.

== See also ==
- Communes of the Calvados department
