= Biéville =

Biéville may refer to several communes in France:

- Biéville, Manche, in the Manche department
- Biéville-Beuville, in the Calvados department
- Biéville-Quétiéville, in the Calvados department
