= Montier-en-Der =

- Part of La Porte du Der
- Location of Montier-en-Der
- Location within France Location within Grand Est
- Coordinates: 48°28′43″N 4°46′15″E
- Country: France
- Region: Grand Est
- Department: Haute-Marne
- Arrondissement: Saint-Dizier
- Canton: Wassy
- Commune: La Porte du Der
- Area^{1}: 27.79 km^{2} (10.73 sq mi)
- Elevation: 130 m (430 ft)
- Highest elevation: 160 m (520 ft)
- Lowest elevation: 120 m (390 ft)
- Population (2022): 1,851
  - Density: 66.61/km^{2} (172.5/sq mi)
- Time zone: UTC+01:00 (CET)
  - Summer (DST): UTC+02:00 (CEST)
- Postal code: 52220
- ^{1} French Land Register data, which excludes lakes, ponds, glaciers > 1 km^{2} (0.386 sq mi or 247 acres) and river estuaries.

Montier-en-Der (French pronunciation: [mɔ̃tje ɑ̃ dɛʁ]) is a former commune in the Haute-Marne department in north-eastern France. On 1 January 2016, it was merged into the new commune La Porte du Der. The 10th century church of the former Montier-en-Der Abbey has been preserved.

== See also ==
- Communes of the Haute-Marne department
