= Robert-Magny =

- Part of La Porte du Der
- Location of Robert-Magny
- Location within France Location within Grand Est
- Coordinates: 48°27′42″N 4°50′51″E
- Country: France
- Region: Grand Est
- Department: Haute-Marne
- Arrondissement: Saint-Dizier
- Canton: Wassy
- Commune: La Porte du Der
- Area^{1}: 19.4 km^{2} (7.5 sq mi)
- Population (2022): 261
  - Density: 13.5/km^{2} (34.8/sq mi)
- Time zone: UTC+01:00 (CET)
  - Summer (DST): UTC+02:00 (CEST)
- Postal code: 52220
- ^{1} French Land Register data, which excludes lakes, ponds, glaciers > 1 km^{2} (0.386 sq mi or 247 acres) and river estuaries.

Robert-Magny (French pronunciation: [ʁɔbɛʁ maɲi]) is a former commune in the Haute-Marne department in north-eastern France. On 1 January 2016, it was merged into the new commune La Porte du Der. Between 1972 and 2012 it was part of the commune Robert-Magny-Laneuville-à-Rémy.

== See also ==
- Communes of the Haute-Marne department
