= Hyèvre-Paroisse =

- Commune
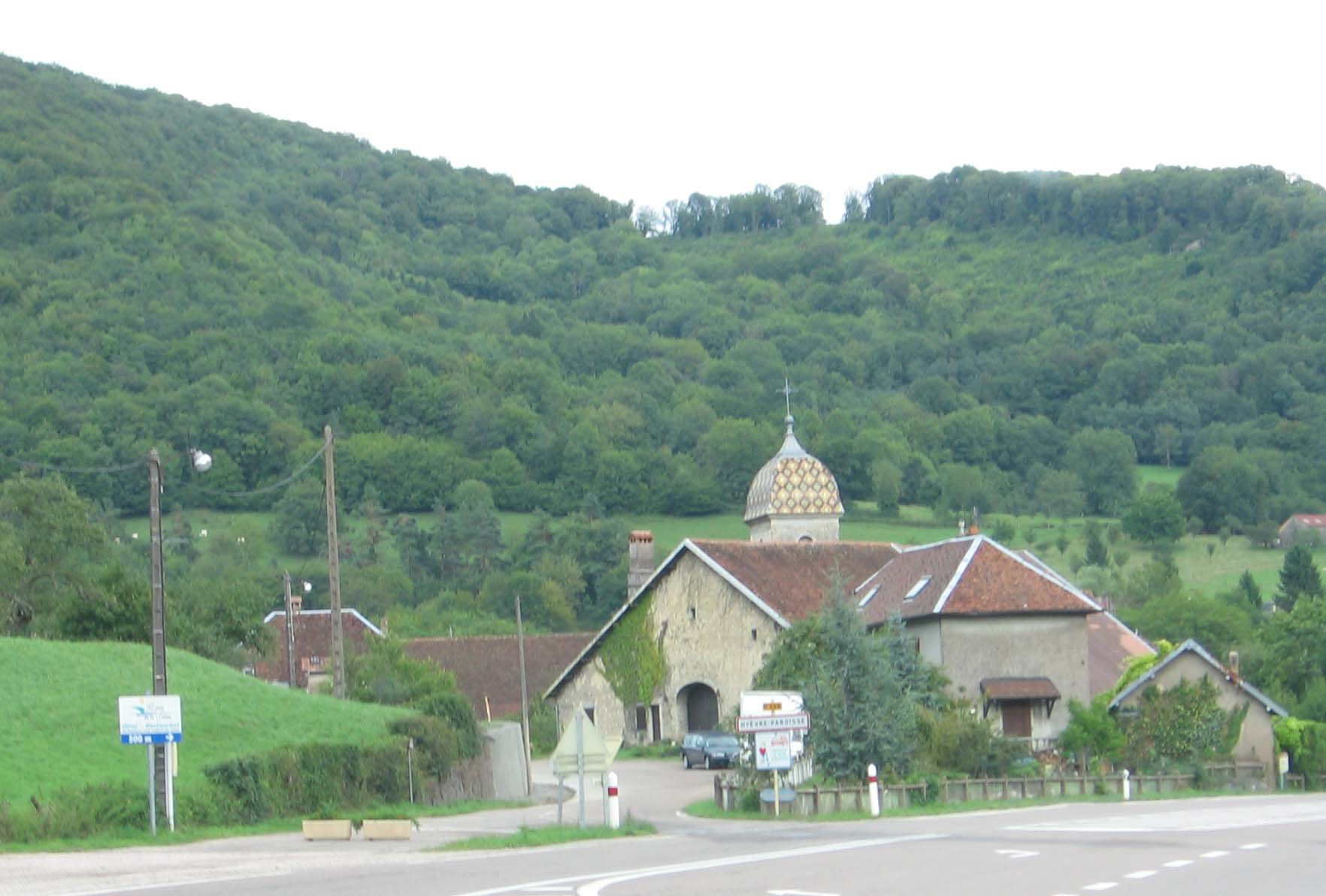
- A general view of Hyèvre-Paroisse
- Location of Hyèvre-Paroisse
- Location within France Location within Bourgogne-Franche-Comté
- Coordinates: 47°22′20″N 6°25′52″E
- Country: France
- Region: Bourgogne-Franche-Comté
- Department: Doubs
- Arrondissement: Besançon
- Canton: Baume-les-Dames
- Intercommunality: Doubs Baumois

Government
  - Mayor (2020–2026): Philippe Cuenot
- Area^{1}: 8.79 km^{2} (3.39 sq mi)
- Highest elevation: 554 m (1,818 ft)
- Lowest elevation: 267 m (876 ft)
- Population (2023): 190
  - Density: 22/km^{2} (56/sq mi)
- Time zone: UTC+01:00 (CET)
  - Summer (DST): UTC+02:00 (CEST)
- INSEE/Postal code: 25313 /25110
- ^{1} French Land Register data, which excludes lakes, ponds, glaciers > 1 km^{2} (0.386 sq mi or 247 acres) and river estuaries.

Hyèvre-Paroisse (French pronunciation: [jɛvʁ paʁwas]) is a commune in the Doubs department in the Bourgogne-Franche-Comté region in eastern France.

== Population ==
Historical population
Year	Pop.	±% p.a.
1968	209	—
1975	238	+1.87%
1982	223	−0.93%
1990	183	−2.44%
1999	188	+0.30%
2007	192	+0.26%
2012	186	−0.63%
2017	191	+0.53%
2023	190	−0.09%
Source: INSEE

== See also ==
- Hyèvre-Magny
- Communes of the Doubs department
