= Château de Canon =

18th-century château in Normandy, France

Coordinates: 49.0785°N 0.0947°W

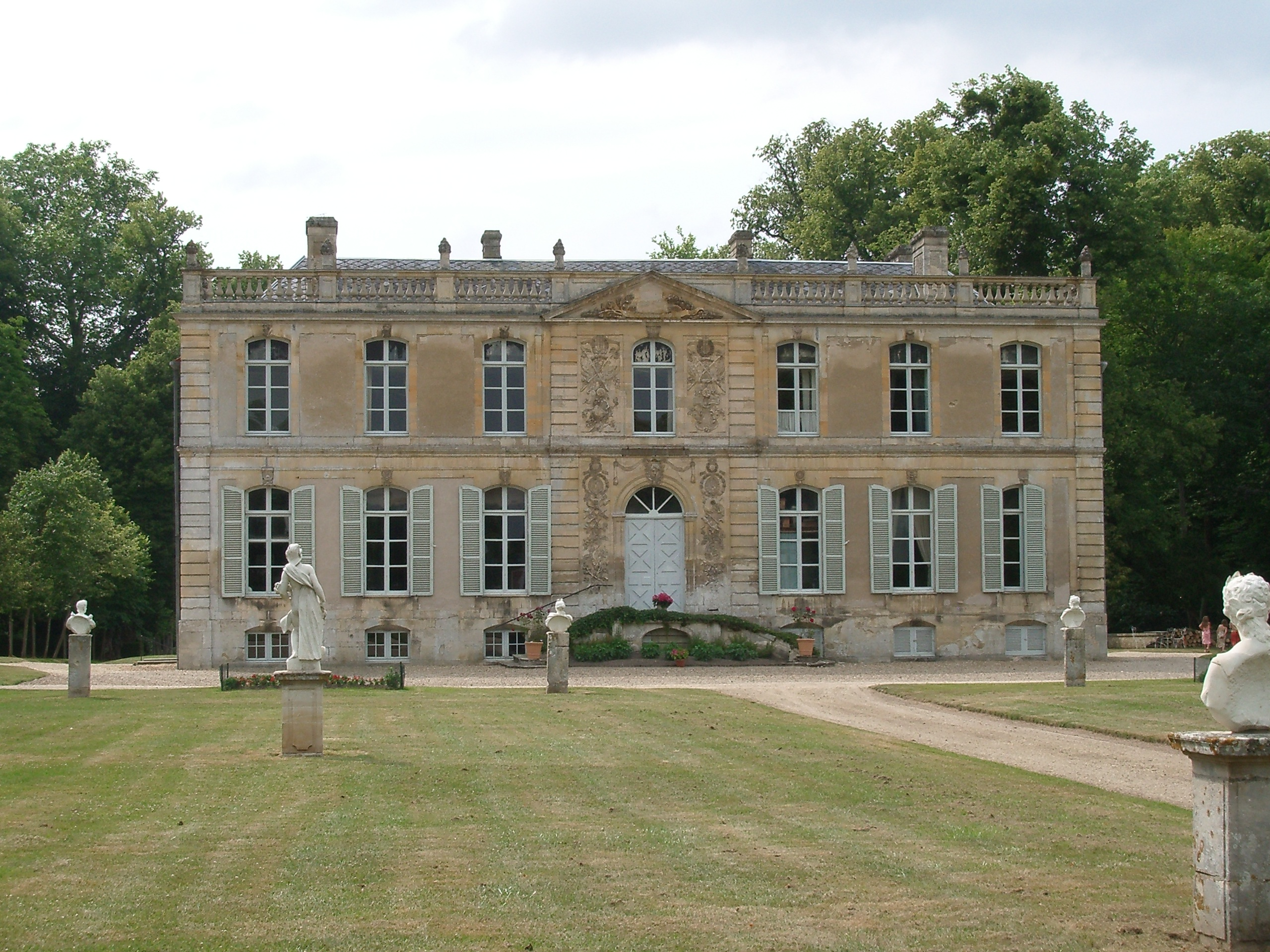
Château de Canon

The Château de Canon is an 18th-century château located in the commune of Mézidon Vallée d'Auge, in Pays d'Auge, in the Calvados departement, Normandy, France.

The castle was listed (inscrit) as a monument historique on June 11, 1941.

== Gardens ==
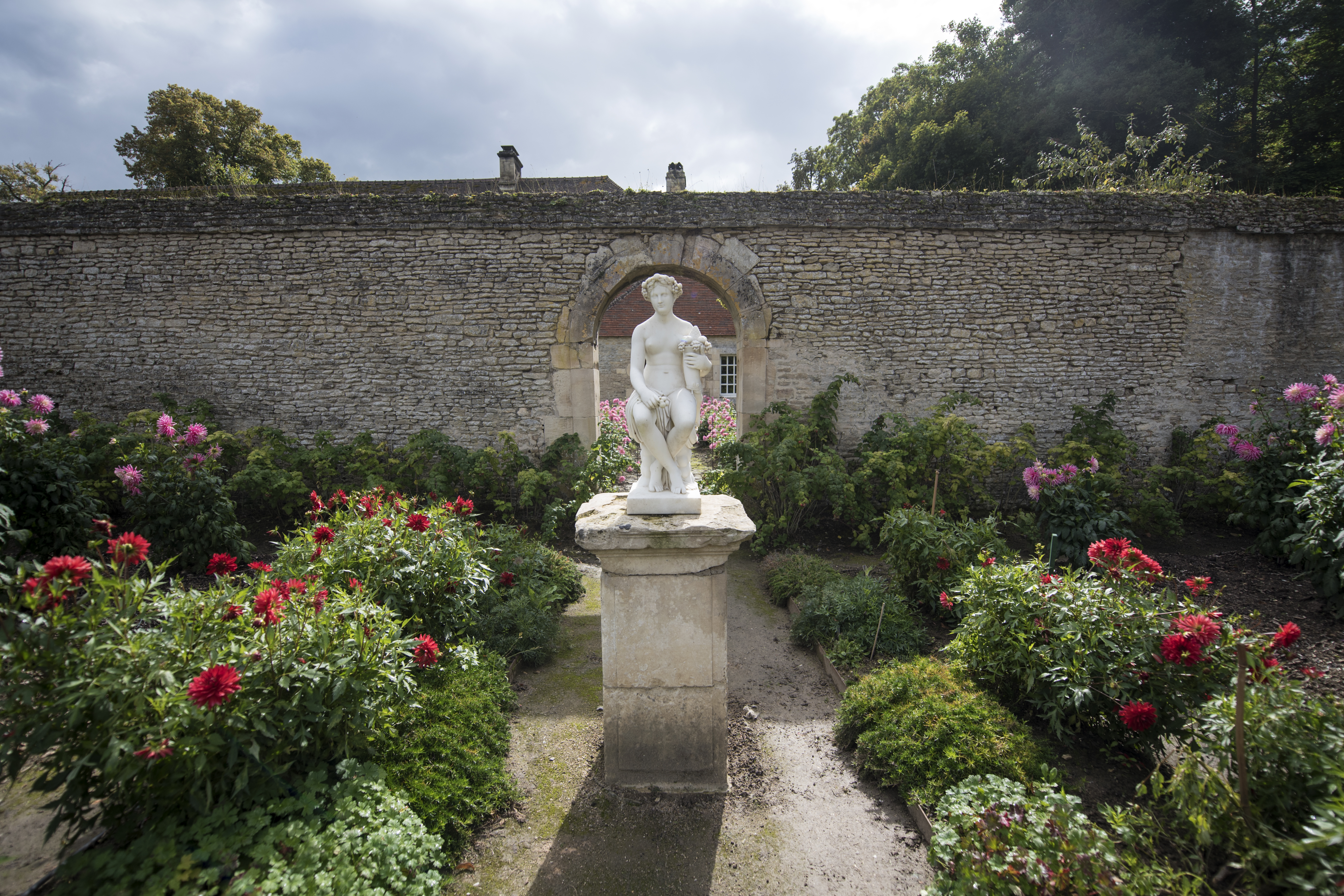
Walled garden

The gardens of the castle are classified Jardin remarquable (Remarkable garden), mainly for the thirteen walled gardens, called chartreuses, which serve as a setting for hundreds of varieties of flowers and are open to visitors.

The association Vieilles maisons françaises (Old French houses) awarded them the first prize for preservation in 1985, and the fondation des parcs et jardins de France (foundation of parks and gardens of France) awarded them a first prize in 1987. After the Lothar storm in 1999, the castle has received aid from the foundation of parks and gardens of France. In May 2000, the gardens received the first prize from the Art du Jardin company.
