= La Porte du Der =

- Commune
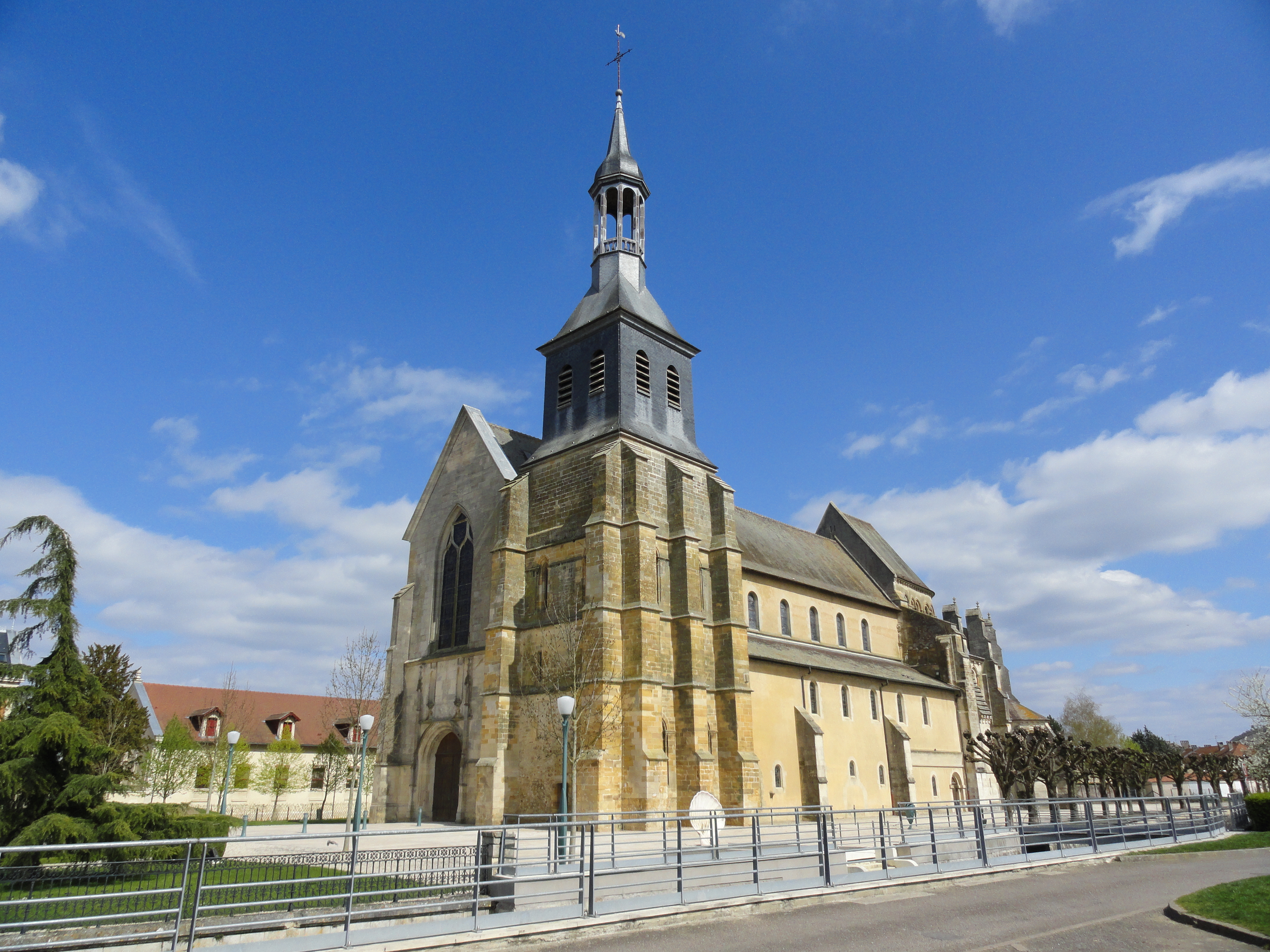
- The abbey in Montier-en-Der
- Location of La Porte du Der
- Location within France Location within Grand Est
- Coordinates: 48°28′41″N 4°46′16″E
- Country: France
- Region: Grand Est
- Department: Haute-Marne
- Arrondissement: Saint-Dizier
- Canton: Wassy
- Intercommunality: CA Grand Saint-Dizier, Der et Vallées

Government
  - Mayor (2020–2026): Jean-Jacques Bayer
- Area^{1}: 47.23 km^{2} (18.24 sq mi)
- Population (2023): 2,099
  - Density: 44.44/km^{2} (115.1/sq mi)
- Time zone: UTC+01:00 (CET)
  - Summer (DST): UTC+02:00 (CEST)
- INSEE/Postal code: 52331 /52220
- ^{1} French Land Register data, which excludes lakes, ponds, glaciers > 1 km^{2} (0.386 sq mi or 247 acres) and river estuaries.

La Porte du Der (French pronunciation: [la pɔʁt dy dɛʁ]) is a commune in the Haute-Marne department of northeastern France. The commune was established on 1 January 2016 and consists of the former communes of Montier-en-Der and Robert-Magny.

== Population ==
Population data refer to the commune in its geography as of January 2025.

Historical population
Year	Pop.	±% p.a.
1968	2,346	—
1975	2,321	−0.15%
1982	2,304	−0.10%
1990	2,194	−0.61%
1999	2,201	+0.04%
2007	2,319	+0.65%
2012	2,352	+0.28%
2017	2,278	−0.64%
2023	2,099	−1.35%
Source: INSEE

== See also ==
- Communes of the Haute-Marne department
