= Rownhams =

Village in Hampshire, England

Coordinates: 50°56′51″N 1°27′15″W

- Village
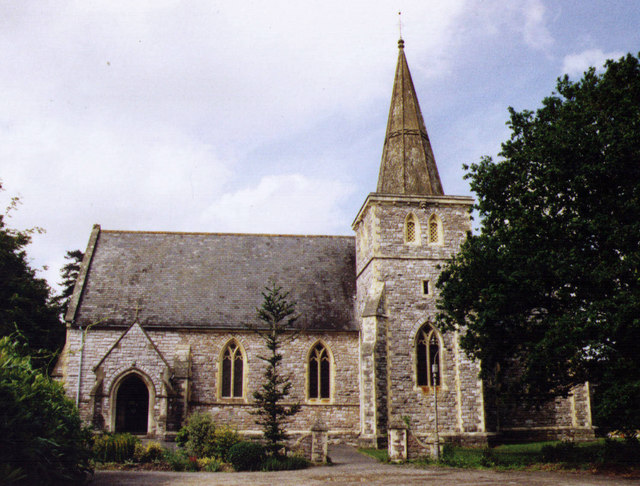
- St John the Evangelist, Rownhams

- Location within Hampshire
- Civil parish: Nursling and Rownhams
- District: Test Valley
- Shire county: Hampshire
- Region: South East
- Country: England
- Sovereign state: United Kingdom
- Post town: Southampton
- Postcode district: SO16
- Dialling code: 023
- Police: Hampshire and Isle of Wight
- Fire: Hampshire and Isle of Wight
- Ambulance: South Central
- UK Parliament: Romsey and Southampton North

Rownhams is a village in the civil parish of Nursling and Rownhams, in the Test Valley district, in Hampshire, England, situated just outside the boundaries of the City of Southampton, to the north-west. Rownhams services is a nearby service station on the M27 motorway that runs to the north of the village.

The village consists of over 1200 homes. Rownhams house, a Georgian mansion, is now a business park and wedding venue, The parish church is St John the Evangelist. There is a community centre, a primary school, two pre-schools and a hairdressing salon. The village is planned to grow in the next few years as several planning applications are either in the system or have been approved.

For many years the parish and village has been combined with Nursling and also Toothill, which were once separate independent villages. Hence, for example, the churches are joined in the joint parish of Nursling and Rownhams with one incumbent and run by one parochial church council.

The village has been twinned with the village of Percy-en-Auge in Normandy since 1988.

Many of the activities and facilities are shared between Rownhams and Nursling, e.g. Ladies' night, two Brownie packs, a full set of groups of Scouts, a friendship club for "senior residents", Retired Men's Fellowship and a toddler group. Also a badminton club, an amateur astronomers' group, who use an observatory at Toothill, a writers' group, "Coffee Break" - a drop in for anybody home alone, a carer or being cared for in the community, and a dance school.

== History ==
Rownhams was formerly a chapelry in the parishes of Nursling, Romsey and North Baddesley, on 1 October 1897 Rownhams became a separate civil parish, on 1 April 1932 the parish was abolished to form "Nursling and Rownhams". In 1931 the parish had a population of 540.
