= Belle Vie en Auge =

- Commune
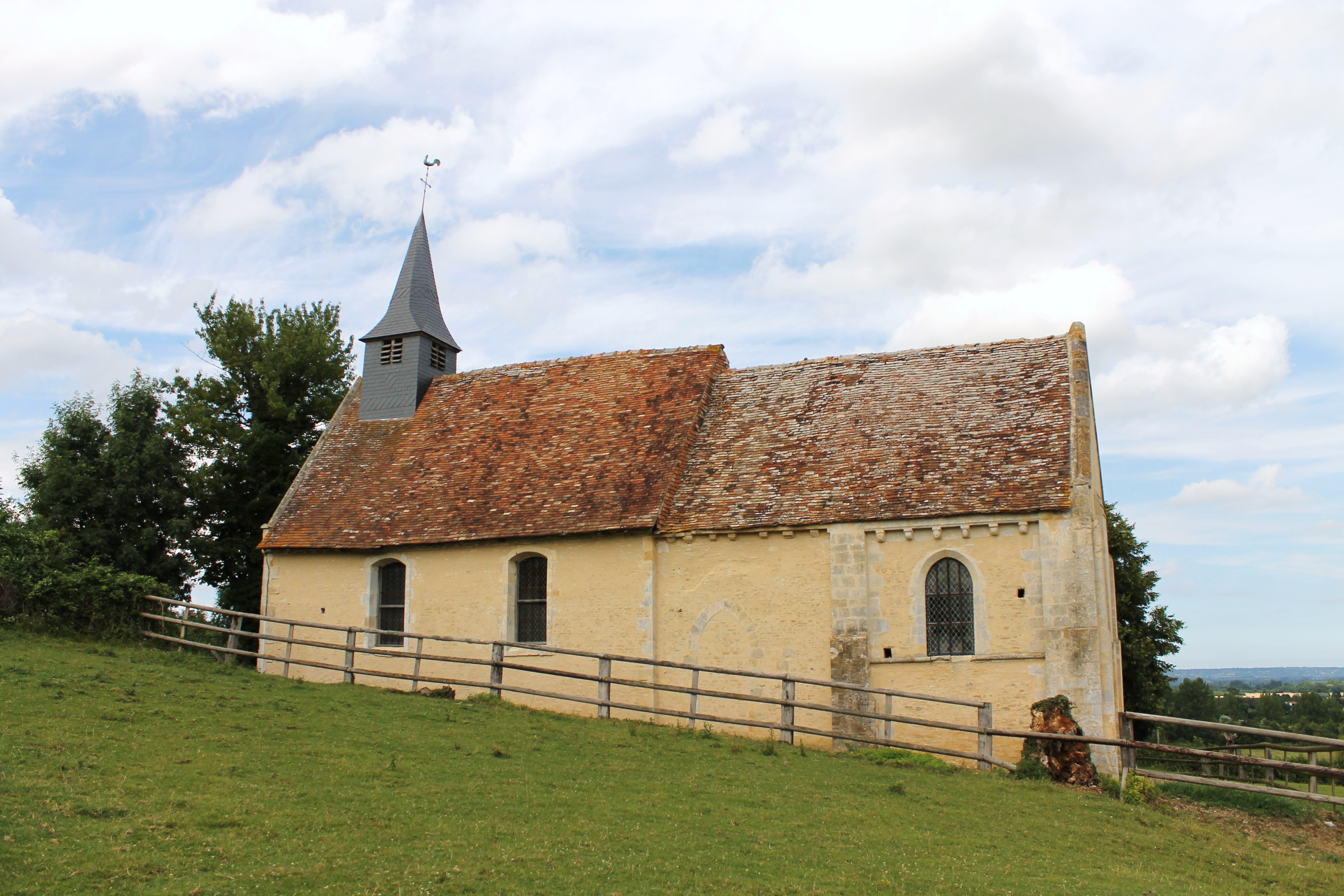
- The church in Mirbel, in Belle Vie en Auge
- Location of Belle Vie en Auge
- Location within France Location within Normandy
- Coordinates: 49°06′32″N 0°02′17″W
- Country: France
- Region: Normandy
- Department: Calvados
- Arrondissement: Lisieux
- Canton: Mézidon Vallée d'Auge
- Intercommunality: CA Lisieux Normandie

Government
  - Mayor (2020–2026): Gérard Louis
- Area^{1}: 23.57 km^{2} (9.10 sq mi)
- Population (2023): 538
  - Density: 22.8/km^{2} (59.1/sq mi)
- Time zone: UTC+01:00 (CET)
  - Summer (DST): UTC+02:00 (CEST)
- INSEE/Postal code: 14527 /14270
- ^{1} French Land Register data, which excludes lakes, ponds, glaciers > 1 km^{2} (0.386 sq mi or 247 acres) and river estuaries.

Belle Vie en Auge (French pronunciation: [bɛl vi ɑ̃.n‿oʒ]) is a commune in the department of Calvados, northwestern France. The municipality was established on 1 January 2017 by merger of the former communes of Biéville-Quétiéville (the seat) and Saint-Loup-de-Fribois.

== See also ==
- Communes of the Calvados department
