= Laneuville-à-Rémy =

- Commune
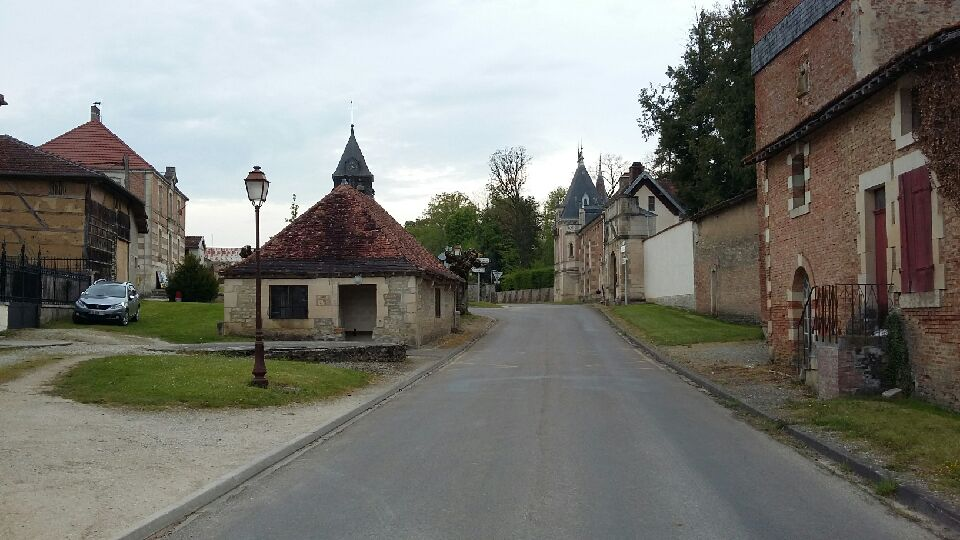
- The centre of Laneuville-à-Rémy
- Location of Laneuville-à-Rémy
- Location within France Location within Grand Est
- Coordinates: 48°28′32″N 4°53′16″E
- Country: France
- Region: Grand Est
- Department: Haute-Marne
- Arrondissement: Saint-Dizier
- Canton: Wassy
- Intercommunality: CA Grand Saint-Dizier, Der et Vallées
- Area^{1}: 6.0 km^{2} (2.3 sq mi)
- Population (2023): 68
  - Density: 11/km^{2} (29/sq mi)
- Time zone: UTC+01:00 (CET)
  - Summer (DST): UTC+02:00 (CEST)
- INSEE/Postal code: 52266 /52220
- ^{1} French Land Register data, which excludes lakes, ponds, glaciers > 1 km^{2} (0.386 sq mi or 247 acres) and river estuaries.

Laneuville-à-Rémy (French pronunciation: [lanøvil a ʁemi]) is a commune in the Haute-Marne department in north-eastern France. Between 1972 and 2012 it was part of the commune Robert-Magny-Laneuville-à-Rémy.

== See also ==
- Communes of the Haute-Marne department
