= Mézidon Vallée d'Auge =

- Commune
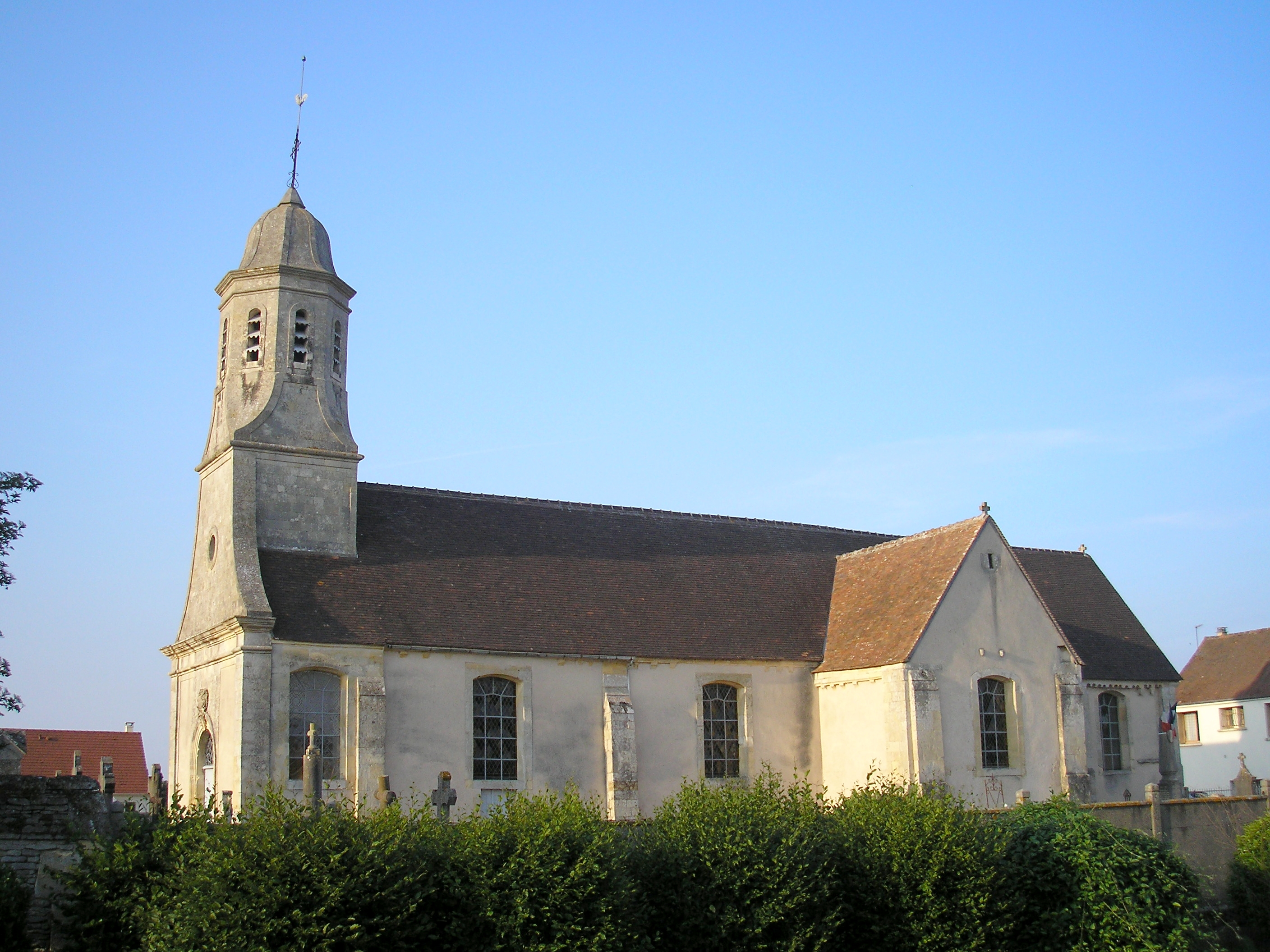
- The church in Vieux-Fumé
- Location of Mézidon Vallée d'Auge
- Location within France Location within Normandy
- Coordinates: 49°04′26″N 0°04′12″W
- Country: France
- Region: Normandy
- Department: Calvados
- Arrondissement: Lisieux
- Canton: Mézidon Vallée d'Auge
- Intercommunality: CA Lisieux Normandie

Government
  - Mayor (2020–2026): François Aubey
- Area^{1}: 103.18 km^{2} (39.84 sq mi)
- Population (2023): 9,766
  - Density: 94.65/km^{2} (245.1/sq mi)
- Time zone: UTC+01:00 (CET)
  - Summer (DST): UTC+02:00 (CEST)
- INSEE/Postal code: 14431 /14270
- ^{1} French Land Register data, which excludes lakes, ponds, glaciers > 1 km^{2} (0.386 sq mi or 247 acres) and river estuaries.

Mézidon Vallée d'Auge (French pronunciation: [mezidɔ̃ vale doʒ], lit. 'Mézidon Valley of Auge') is a commune in the department of Calvados, northwestern France. The municipality was established on 1 January 2017 by merger of the former communes of Mézidon-Canon (the seat), Les Authieux-Papion, Coupesarte, Crèvecœur-en-Auge, Croissanville, Grandchamp-le-Château, Lécaude, Magny-la-Campagne, Magny-le-Freule, Le Mesnil-Mauger, Monteille, Percy-en-Auge, Saint-Julien-le-Faucon and Vieux-Fumé. Mézidon station has rail connections to Argentan, Caen, Lisieux and Rouen.

== Population ==
Population data refer to the commune in its geography as of January 2025.

Historical population
Year	Pop.	±% p.a.
1968	8,478	—
1975	7,857	−1.08%
1982	8,460	+1.06%
1990	8,749	+0.42%
1999	8,975	+0.28%
2007	9,311	+0.46%
2012	9,766	+0.96%
2017	9,712	−0.11%
2023	9,766	+0.09%
Source: INSEE

== See also ==
- Communes of the Calvados department
- Château de Canon
