= Monteille =

- Part of Mézidon Vallée d'Auge
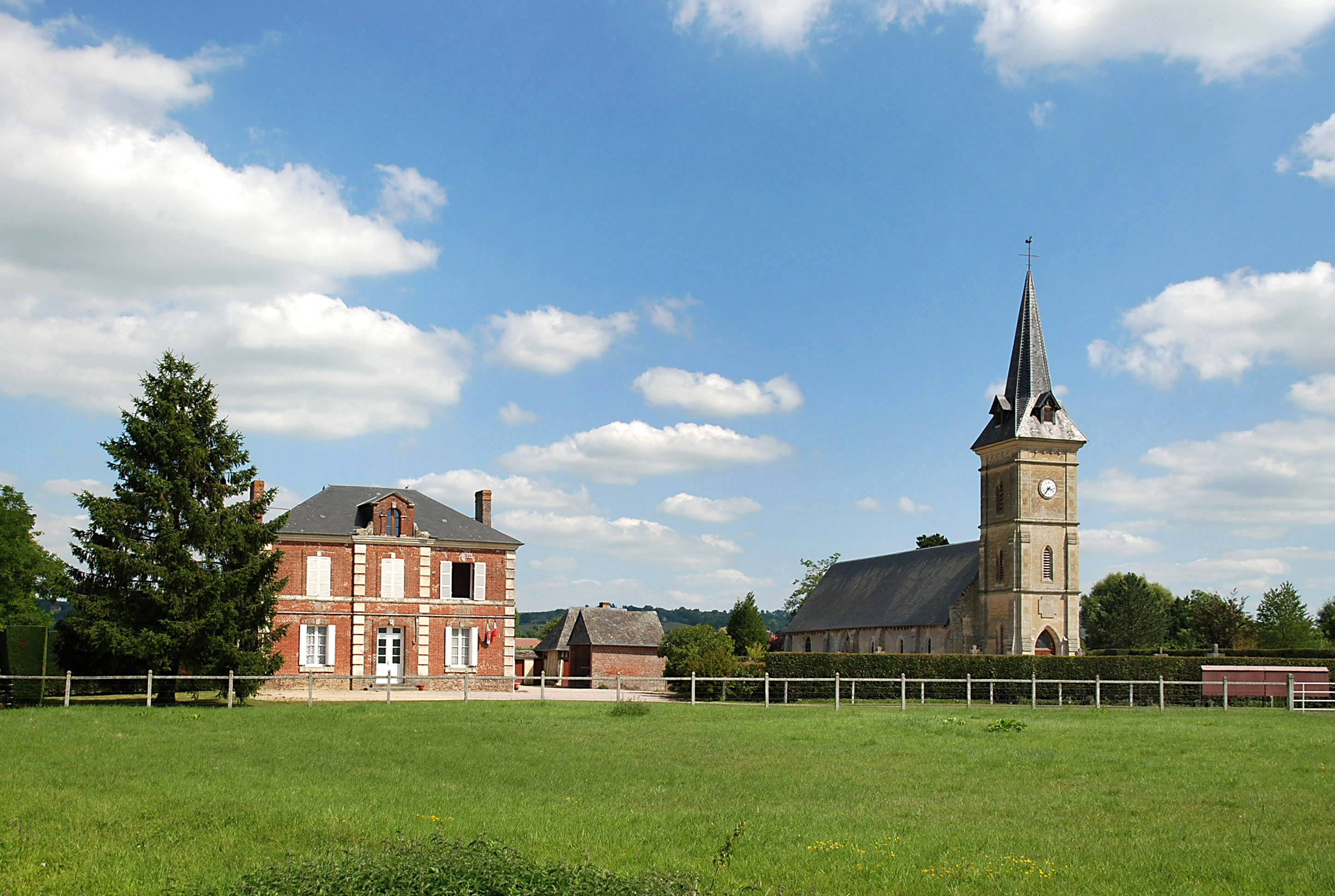
- Location of Monteille
- Location within France Location within Normandy
- Coordinates: 49°06′32″N 0°02′46″E
- Country: France
- Region: Normandy
- Department: Calvados
- Arrondissement: Lisieux
- Canton: Mézidon Vallée d'Auge
- Commune: Mézidon Vallée d'Auge
- Area^{1}: 4.53 km^{2} (1.75 sq mi)
- Elevation: 40 m (130 ft)
- Highest elevation: 59 m (194 ft)
- Lowest elevation: 17 m (56 ft)
- Population (2023): 156
  - Density: 34.4/km^{2} (89.2/sq mi)
- Time zone: UTC+01:00 (CET)
  - Summer (DST): UTC+02:00 (CEST)
- Postal code: 14270
- ^{1} French Land Register data, which excludes lakes, ponds, glaciers > 1 km^{2} (0.386 sq mi or 247 acres) and river estuaries.

Monteille (French pronunciation: [mɔ̃tɛj]) is a former commune in the Calvados department in the Normandy region in northwestern France. On 1 January 2017, it was merged into the new commune Mézidon Vallée d'Auge.

== See also ==
- Communes of the Calvados department
