= Hyèvre-Magny =

- Commune
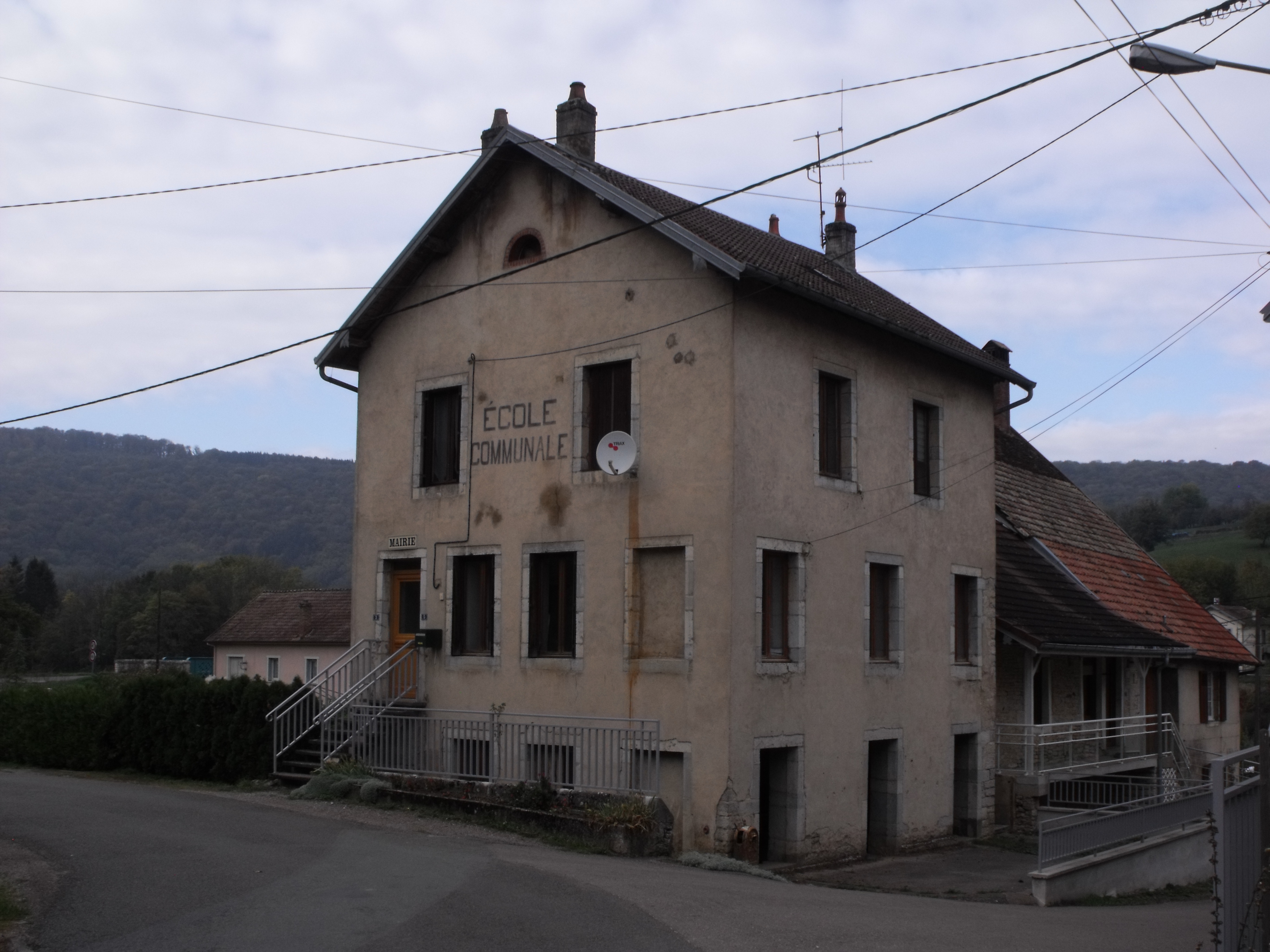
- The town hall in Hyèvre-Magny
- Location of Hyèvre-Magny
- Location within France Location within Bourgogne-Franche-Comté
- Coordinates: 47°21′57″N 6°26′15″E
- Country: France
- Region: Bourgogne-Franche-Comté
- Department: Doubs
- Arrondissement: Besançon
- Canton: Baume-les-Dames

Government
  - Mayor (2020–2026): Gérard Nicolas
- Area^{1}: 3.41 km^{2} (1.32 sq mi)
- Highest elevation: 499 m (1,637 ft)
- Lowest elevation: 267 m (876 ft)
- Population (2023): 61
  - Density: 18/km^{2} (46/sq mi)
- Time zone: UTC+01:00 (CET)
  - Summer (DST): UTC+02:00 (CEST)
- INSEE/Postal code: 25312 /25110
- ^{1} French Land Register data, which excludes lakes, ponds, glaciers > 1 km^{2} (0.386 sq mi or 247 acres) and river estuaries.

Hyèvre-Magny (French pronunciation: [jɛvʁ maɲi]) is a commune in the Doubs department in the Bourgogne-Franche-Comté region in eastern France.

== Population ==
Historical population
Year	Pop.	±% p.a.
1968	67	—
1975	68	+0.21%
1982	61	−1.54%
1990	51	−2.21%
1999	51	+0.00%
2007	66	+3.28%
2012	80	+3.92%
2017	71	−2.36%
2023	61	−2.50%
Source: INSEE

== See also ==
- Hyèvre-Paroisse
- Communes of the Doubs department
