= Coupesarte =

- Part of Mézidon Vallée d'Auge
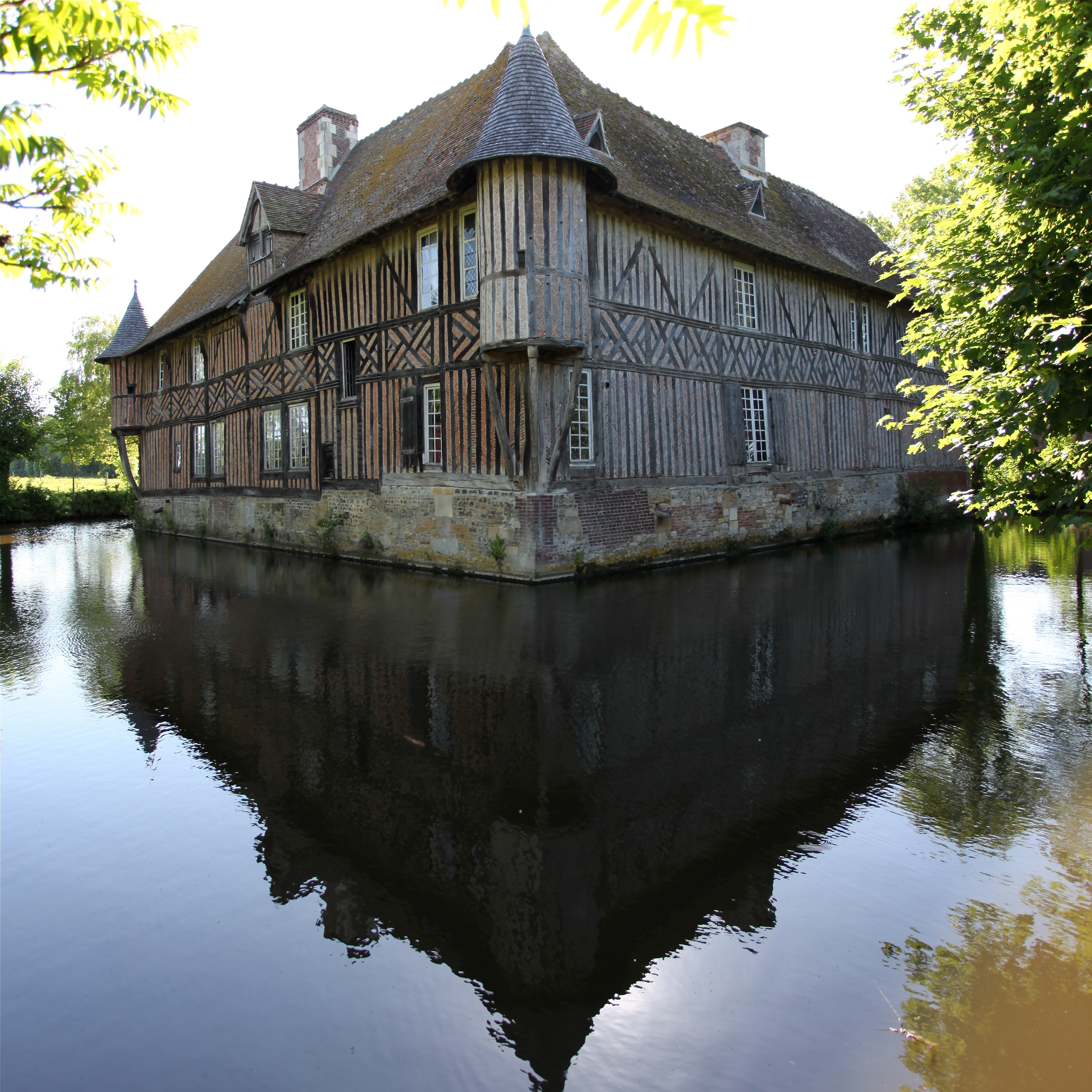
- Coupesarte Manor (16th century)
- Location of Coupesarte
- Location within France Location within Normandy
- Coordinates: 49°03′32″N 0°06′27″E
- Country: France
- Region: Normandy
- Department: Calvados
- Arrondissement: Lisieux
- Canton: Mézidon Vallée d'Auge
- Commune: Mézidon Vallée d'Auge
- Area^{1}: 4.47 km^{2} (1.73 sq mi)
- Elevation: 45 m (148 ft)
- Highest elevation: 135 m (443 ft)
- Lowest elevation: 32 m (105 ft)
- Population (2023): 47
  - Density: 11/km^{2} (27/sq mi)
- Time zone: UTC+01:00 (CET)
  - Summer (DST): UTC+02:00 (CEST)
- Postal code: 14140
- ^{1} French Land Register data, which excludes lakes, ponds, glaciers > 1 km^{2} (0.386 sq mi or 247 acres) and river estuaries.

Coupesarte (French pronunciation: [kupsaʁt]) is a former commune in the Calvados department in the Normandy region in northwestern France. On 1 January 2017, it was merged into the new commune Mézidon Vallée d'Auge.

== See also ==
- Communes of the Calvados department
