= Crèvecœur-en-Auge =

- Part of Mézidon Vallée d'Auge
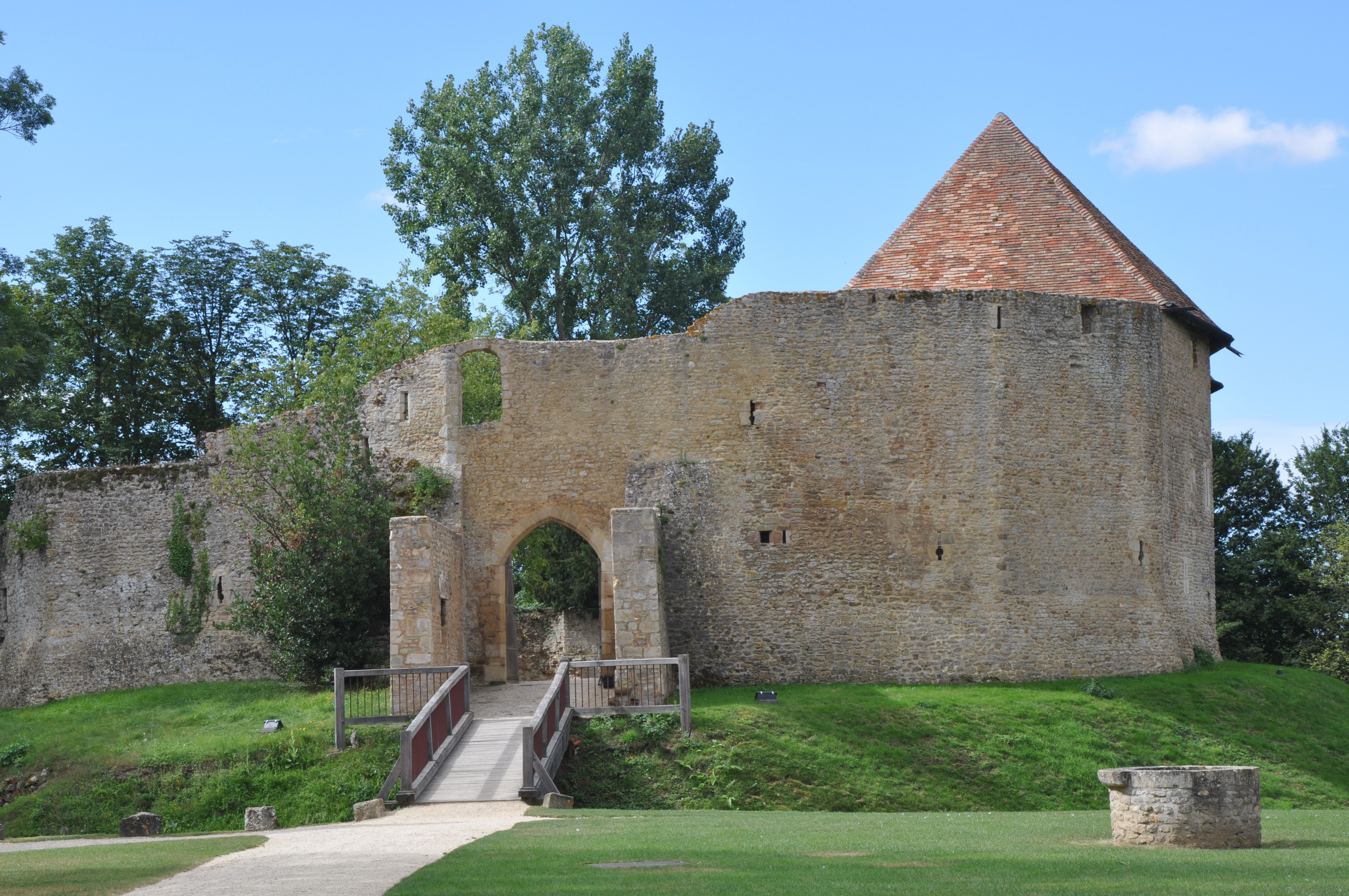
- Ruins of the chateau

- Coat of arms
- Location of Crèvecœur-en-Auge
- Location within France Location within Normandy
- Coordinates: 49°07′05″N 0°00′53″E
- Country: France
- Region: Normandy
- Department: Calvados
- Arrondissement: Lisieux
- Canton: Mézidon Vallée d'Auge
- Commune: Mézidon Vallée d'Auge
- Area^{1}: 2.15 km^{2} (0.83 sq mi)
- Elevation: 22 m (72 ft)
- Highest elevation: 143 m (469 ft)
- Lowest elevation: 14 m (46 ft)
- Population (2023): 479
  - Density: 223/km^{2} (577/sq mi)
- Time zone: UTC+01:00 (CET)
  - Summer (DST): UTC+02:00 (CEST)
- Postal code: 14240
- ^{1} French Land Register data, which excludes lakes, ponds, glaciers > 1 km^{2} (0.386 sq mi or 247 acres) and river estuaries.

Crèvecœur-en-Auge (French pronunciation: [kʁɛvkœʁ ɑ̃.n‿oʒ], lit. 'Crèvecœur in Auge') is a former commune in the Calvados department in the Normandy region in northwestern France. On 1 January 2017, it was merged into the new commune Mézidon Vallée d'Auge. Crèvecœur-en-Auge is twinned with Newton Poppleford in Devon, United Kingdom.

== See also ==
- Communes of the Calvados department
