= Saint-Loup-de-Fribois =

- Part of Belle Vie en Auge
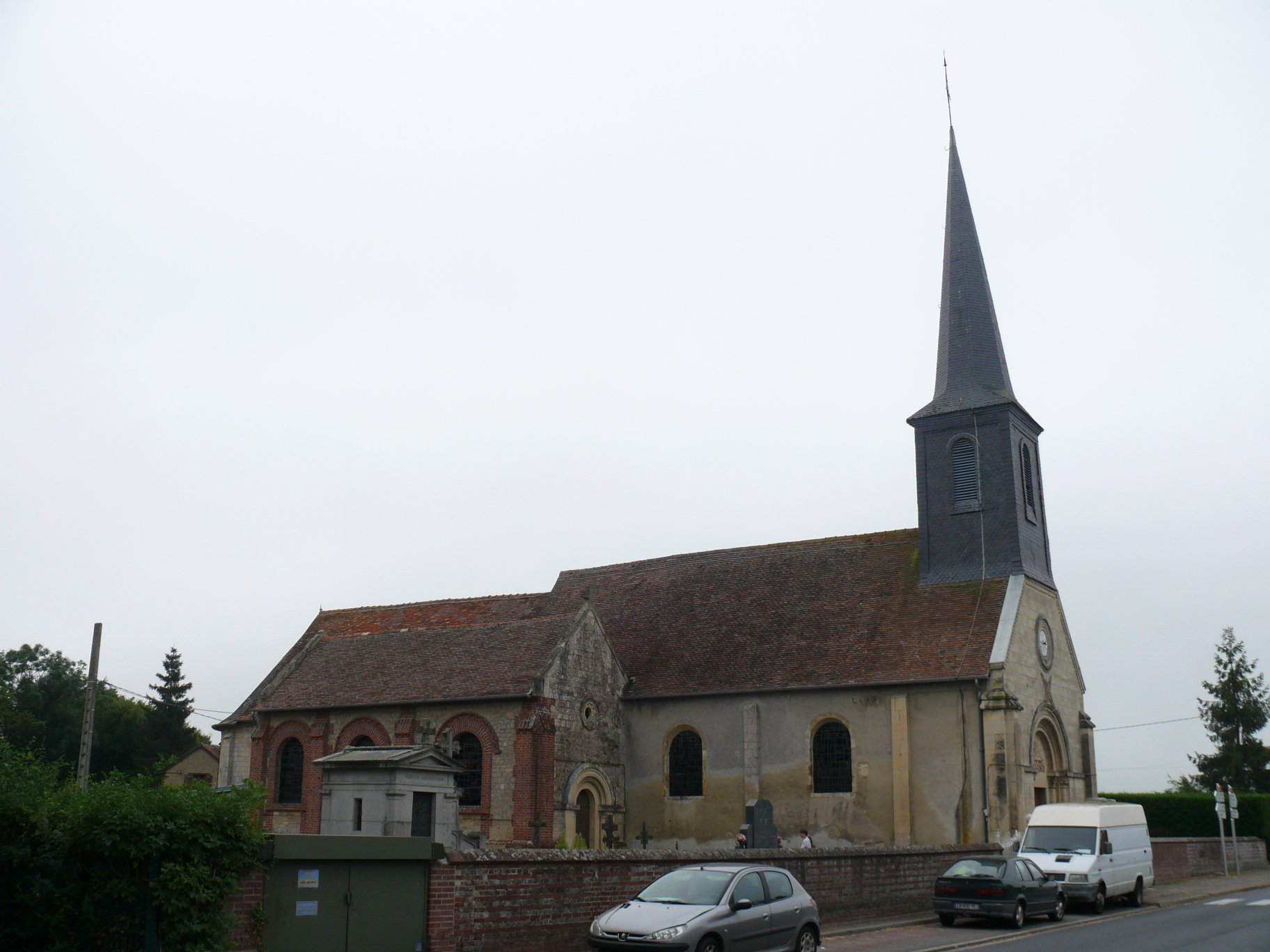
- Location of Saint-Loup-de-Fribois
- Location within France Location within Normandy
- Coordinates: 49°06′46″N 0°00′26″E
- Country: France
- Region: Normandy
- Department: Calvados
- Arrondissement: Lisieux
- Canton: Mézidon Vallée d'Auge
- Commune: Belle Vie en Auge
- Area^{1}: 3.47 km^{2} (1.34 sq mi)
- Elevation: 22 m (72 ft)
- Highest elevation: 31 m (102 ft)
- Lowest elevation: 10 m (33 ft)
- Population (2023): 187
  - Density: 53.9/km^{2} (140/sq mi)
- Time zone: UTC+01:00 (CET)
  - Summer (DST): UTC+02:00 (CEST)
- Postal code: 14340
- ^{1} French Land Register data, which excludes lakes, ponds, glaciers > 1 km^{2} (0.386 sq mi or 247 acres) and river estuaries.

Saint-Loup-de-Fribois (French pronunciation: [sɛ̃ lu də fʁibwa]) is a former commune in the Calvados department in the Normandy region in northwestern France. On 1 January 2017, it was merged into the new commune Belle Vie en Auge.

== See also ==
- Communes of the Calvados department
