= Robert-Magny-Laneuville-à-Rémy =

- Former commune
- Location of Robert-Magny-Laneuville-à-Rémy
- Location within France Location within Grand Est
- Coordinates: 48°27′42″N 4°50′51″E
- Country: France
- Region: Grand Est
- Department: Haute-Marne
- Arrondissement: Saint-Dizier
- Canton: Montier-en-Der
- Area^{1}: 25.38 km^{2} (9.80 sq mi)
- Elevation: 155 m (509 ft)
- Highest elevation: 192 m (630 ft)
- Lowest elevation: 134 m (440 ft)
- Population (2009): 310
  - Density: 12/km^{2} (32/sq mi)
- Time zone: UTC+01:00 (CET)
  - Summer (DST): UTC+02:00 (CEST)
- INSEE/Postal code: 52427 /52220
- ^{1} French Land Register data, which excludes lakes, ponds, glaciers > 1 km^{2} (0.386 sq mi or 247 acres) and river estuaries.

Robert-Magny-Laneuville-à-Rémy (French pronunciation: [ʁɔbɛʁ maɲi lanøvil a ʁemi]) is a former commune in the Haute-Marne department in north-eastern France. It was formed in 1972 by the merger of Robert-Magny and Laneuville-à-Rémy, and was dissolved back into those two communes in 2012. Its population was 310 in 2009.

== See also ==
- Communes of the Haute-Marne department
