= Croissanville =

- Part of Mézidon Vallée d'Auge
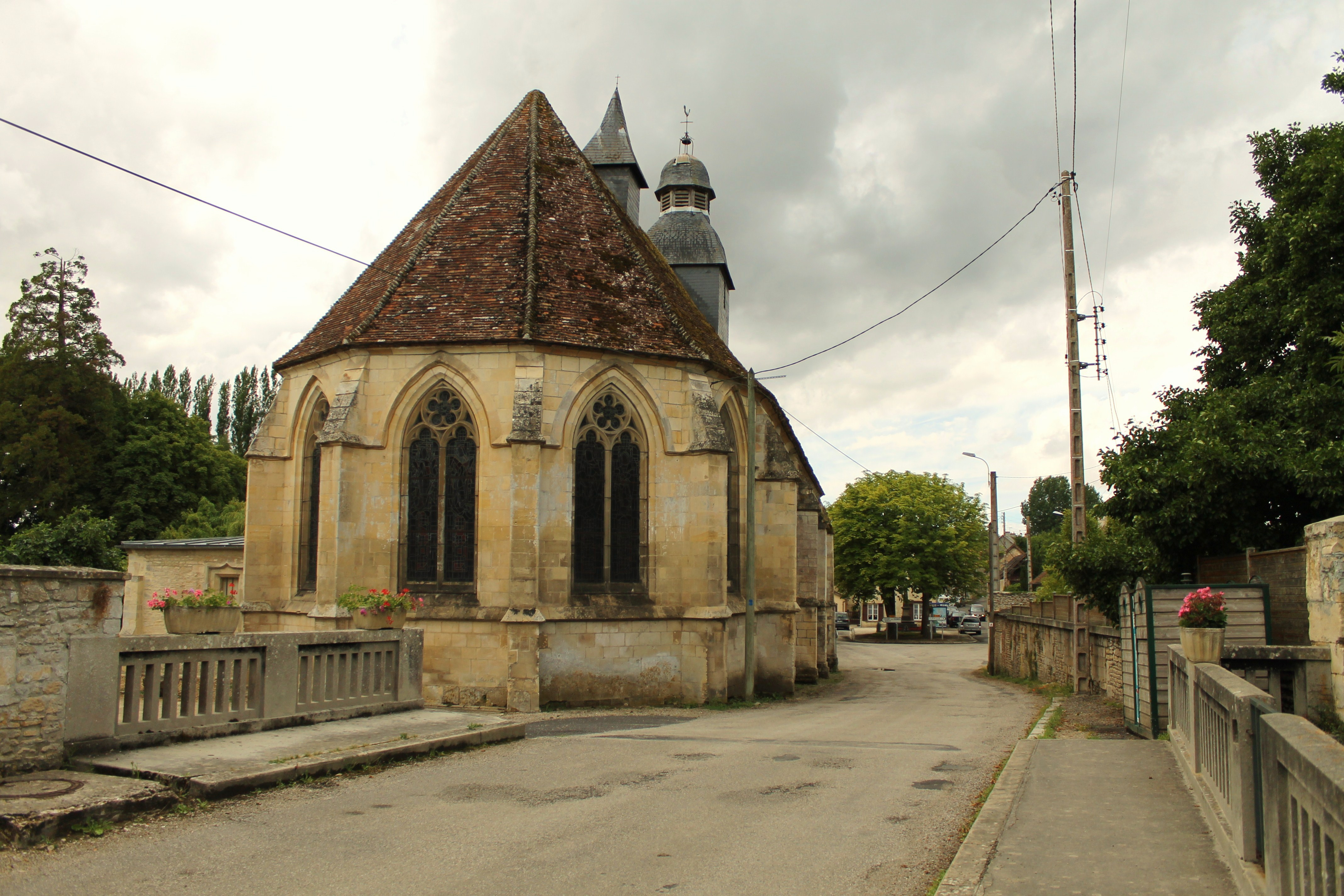
- Location of Croissanville
- Location within France Location within Normandy
- Coordinates: 49°07′18″N 0°06′08″W
- Country: France
- Region: Normandy
- Department: Calvados
- Arrondissement: Lisieux
- Canton: Mézidon Vallée d'Auge
- Commune: Mézidon Vallée d'Auge
- Area^{1}: 4.41 km^{2} (1.70 sq mi)
- Elevation: 53 m (174 ft)
- Highest elevation: 57 m (187 ft)
- Lowest elevation: 12 m (39 ft)
- Population (2023): 593
  - Density: 134/km^{2} (348/sq mi)
- Time zone: UTC+01:00 (CET)
  - Summer (DST): UTC+02:00 (CEST)
- Postal code: 14370
- ^{1} French Land Register data, which excludes lakes, ponds, glaciers > 1 km^{2} (0.386 sq mi or 247 acres) and river estuaries.

Croissanville (French pronunciation: [kʁwasɑ̃vil]) is a former commune in the Calvados department in the Normandy region in northwestern France. On 1 January 2017, it was merged into the new commune Mézidon Vallée d'Auge.

== See also ==
- Communes of the Calvados department
