= Percy-en-Auge =

- Part of Mézidon Vallée d'Auge
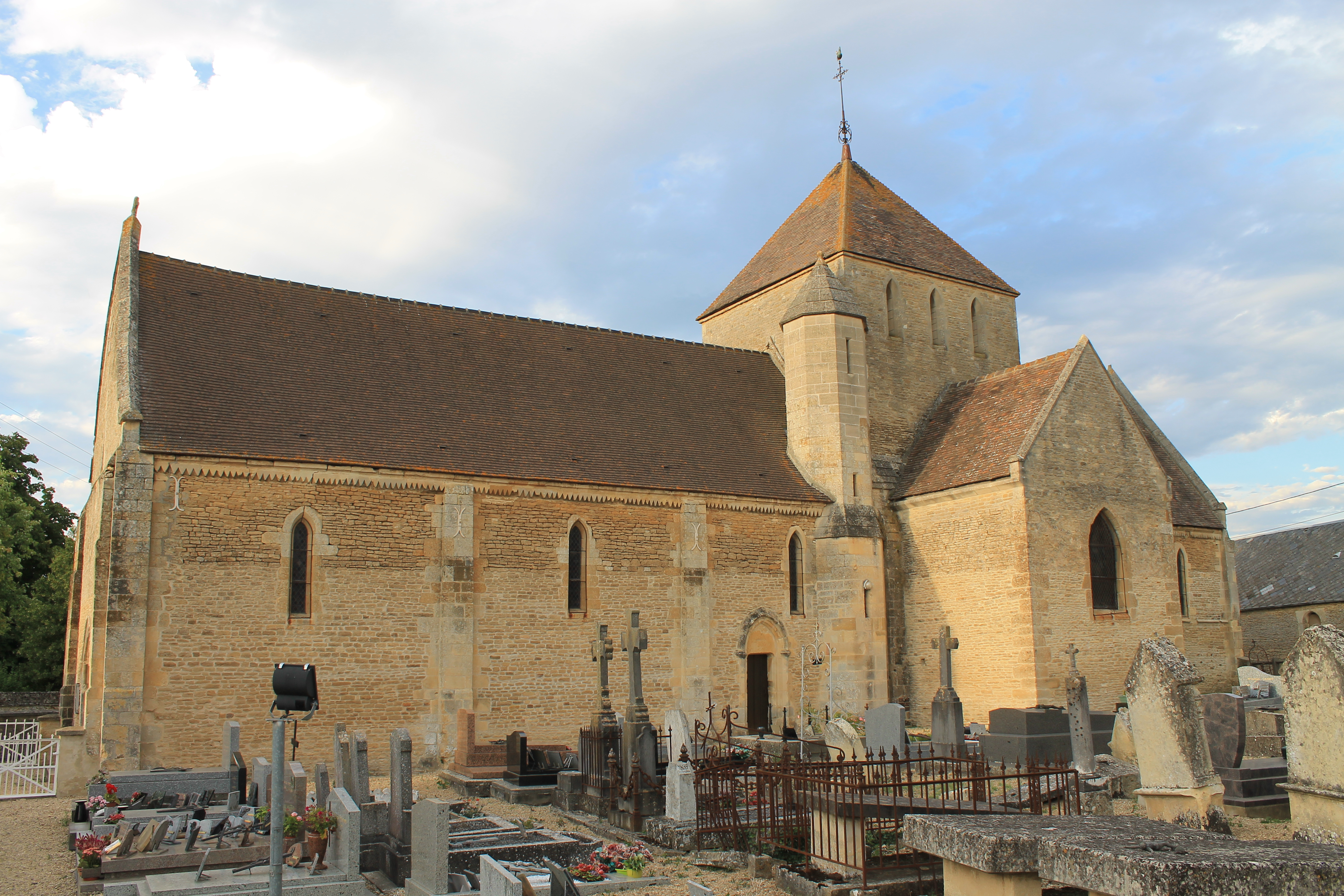
- Location of Percy-en-Auge
- Location within France Location within Normandy
- Coordinates: 49°03′23″N 0°03′42″W
- Country: France
- Region: Normandy
- Department: Calvados
- Arrondissement: Lisieux
- Canton: Mézidon Vallée d'Auge
- Commune: Mézidon Vallée d'Auge
- Area^{1}: 7.04 km^{2} (2.72 sq mi)
- Elevation: 21 m (69 ft)
- Highest elevation: 41 m (135 ft)
- Lowest elevation: 15 m (49 ft)
- Population (2023): 255
  - Density: 36.2/km^{2} (93.8/sq mi)
- Time zone: UTC+01:00 (CET)
  - Summer (DST): UTC+02:00 (CEST)
- Postal code: 14270
- ^{1} French Land Register data, which excludes lakes, ponds, glaciers > 1 km^{2} (0.386 sq mi or 247 acres) and river estuaries.

Percy-en-Auge (French pronunciation: [pɛʁsi ɑ̃.n‿oʒ], literally Percy in Auge) is a former commune in the Calvados department in the Normandy region in northwestern France. On 1 January 2017, it was merged into the new commune Mézidon Vallée d'Auge. It is the ancestral home of the House of Percy.

Since 1988 it has been twinned with the English parish of Nursling and Rownhams in Hampshire.

== See also ==
- Communes of the Calvados department
