= Grandchamp-le-Château =

- Part of Mézidon Vallée d'Auge
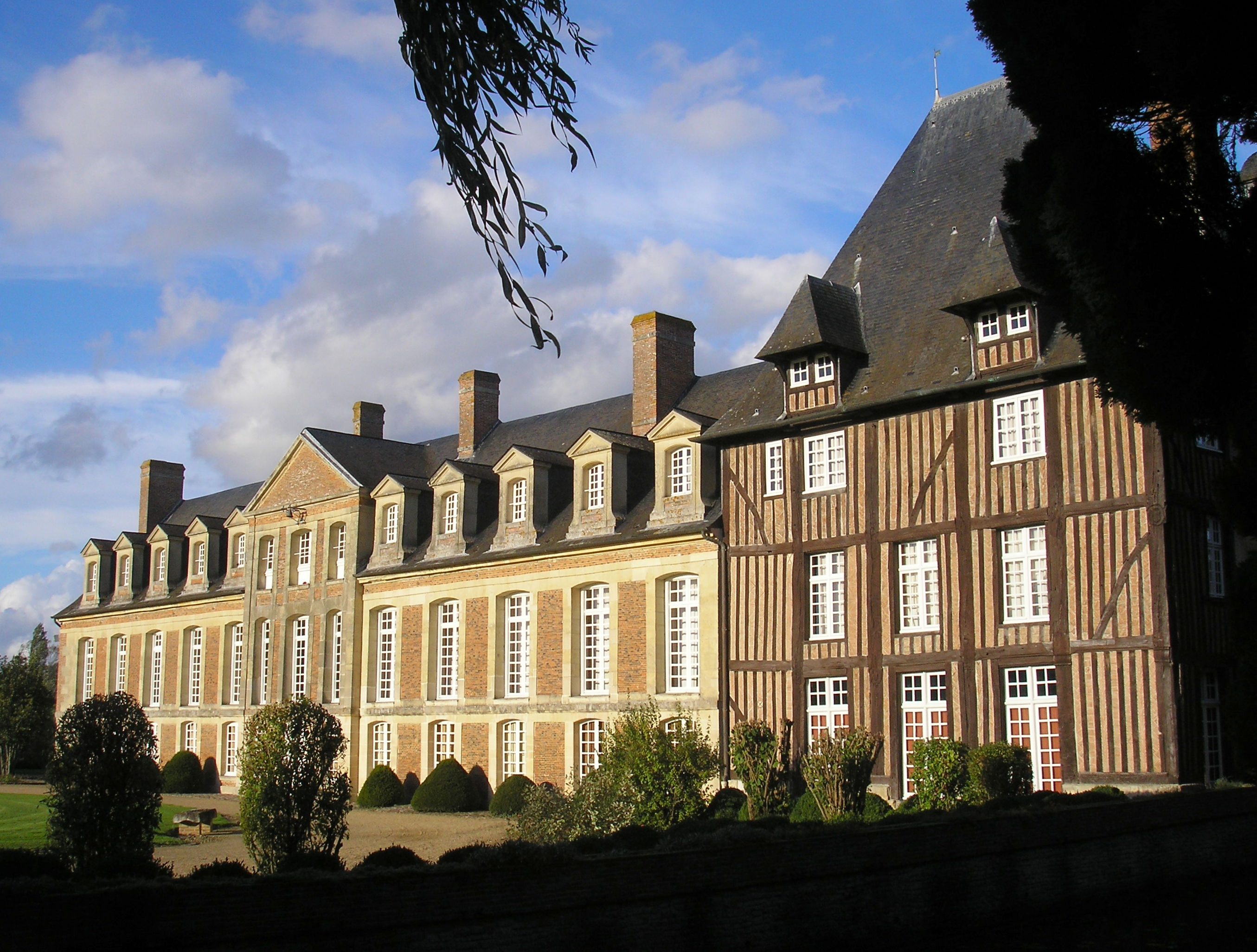
- Chateau
- Location of Grandchamp-le-Château
- Location within France Location within Normandy
- Coordinates: 49°04′41″N 0°04′25″E
- Country: France
- Region: Normandy
- Department: Calvados
- Arrondissement: Lisieux
- Canton: Mézidon Vallée d'Auge
- Commune: Mézidon Vallée d'Auge
- Area^{1}: 3.45 km^{2} (1.33 sq mi)
- Elevation: 30 m (98 ft)
- Highest elevation: 147 m (482 ft)
- Lowest elevation: 24 m (79 ft)
- Population (2023): 75
  - Density: 22/km^{2} (56/sq mi)
- Time zone: UTC+01:00 (CET)
  - Summer (DST): UTC+02:00 (CEST)
- Postal code: 14140
- ^{1} French Land Register data, which excludes lakes, ponds, glaciers > 1 km^{2} (0.386 sq mi or 247 acres) and river estuaries.

Grandchamp-le-Château (French pronunciation: [ɡʁɑ̃ʃɑ̃ lə ʃato]) is a former commune in the Calvados department in the Normandy region in northwestern France. On 1 January 2017, it was merged into the new commune Mézidon Vallée d'Auge.

== See also ==
- Communes of the Calvados department
