= Biéville-Quétiéville =

- Part of Belle Vie en Auge
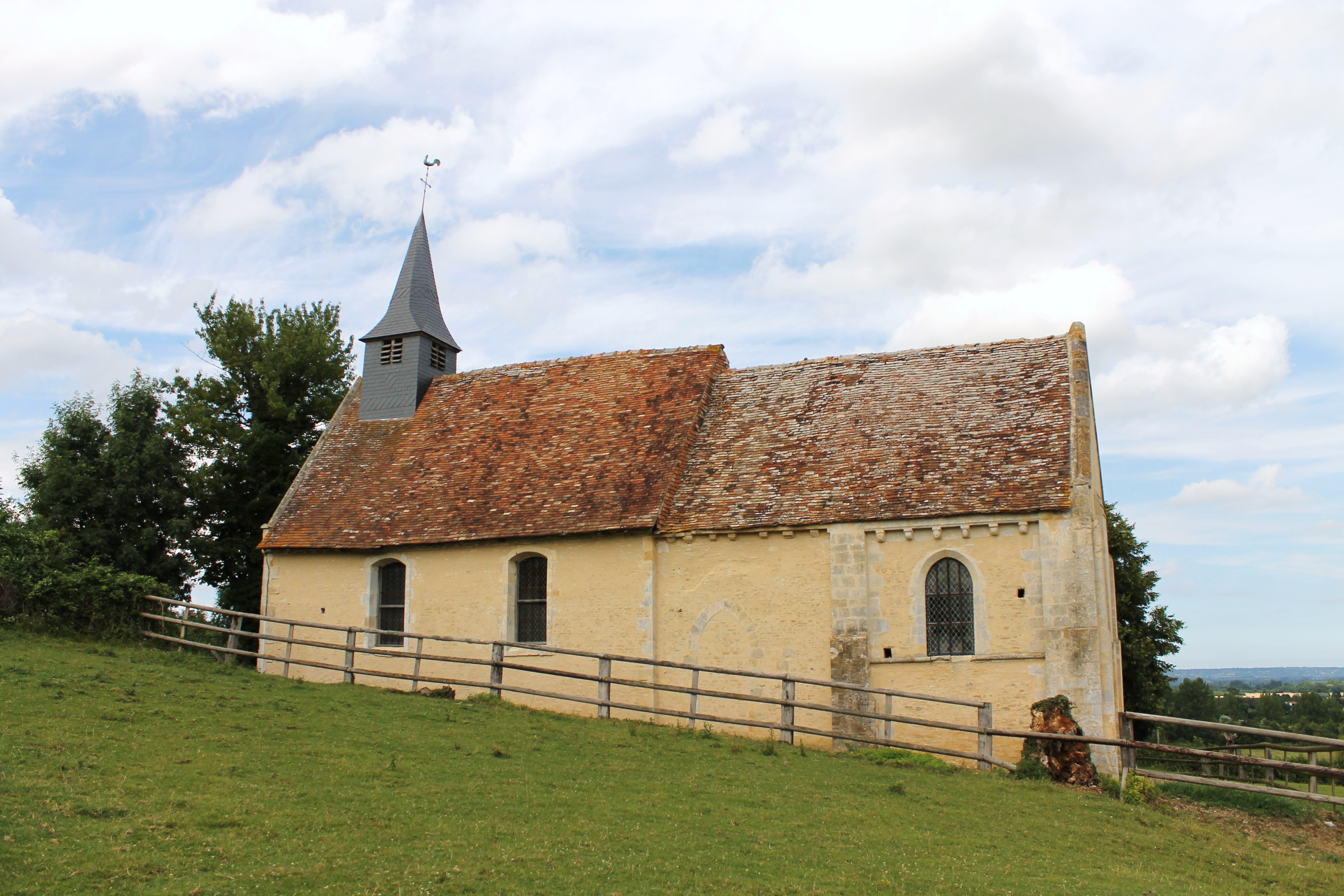
- Location of Biéville-Quétiéville
- Location within France Location within Normandy
- Coordinates: 49°06′33″N 0°02′17″E
- Country: France
- Region: Normandy
- Department: Calvados
- Arrondissement: Lisieux
- Canton: Mézidon Vallée d'Auge
- Commune: Belle Vie en Auge
- Area^{1}: 20.10 km^{2} (7.76 sq mi)
- Elevation: 11 m (36 ft)
- Highest elevation: 58 m (190 ft)
- Lowest elevation: 4 m (13 ft)
- Population (2023): 351
  - Density: 17.5/km^{2} (45.2/sq mi)
- Time zone: UTC+01:00 (CET)
  - Summer (DST): UTC+02:00 (CEST)
- Postal code: 14270
- ^{1} French Land Register data, which excludes lakes, ponds, glaciers > 1 km^{2} (0.386 sq mi or 247 acres) and river estuaries.

Biéville-Quétiéville (French pronunciation: [bjevil ketjevil]) is a former commune in the Calvados department in the Normandy region in northwestern France. It was created in 1973 by the merger of two former communes: Quétiéville and Biéville-en-Auge. On 1 January 2017, it was merged into the new commune Belle Vie en Auge.

== See also ==
- Communes of the Calvados department
