= Saint-Julien-le-Faucon =

- Part of Mézidon Vallée d'Auge
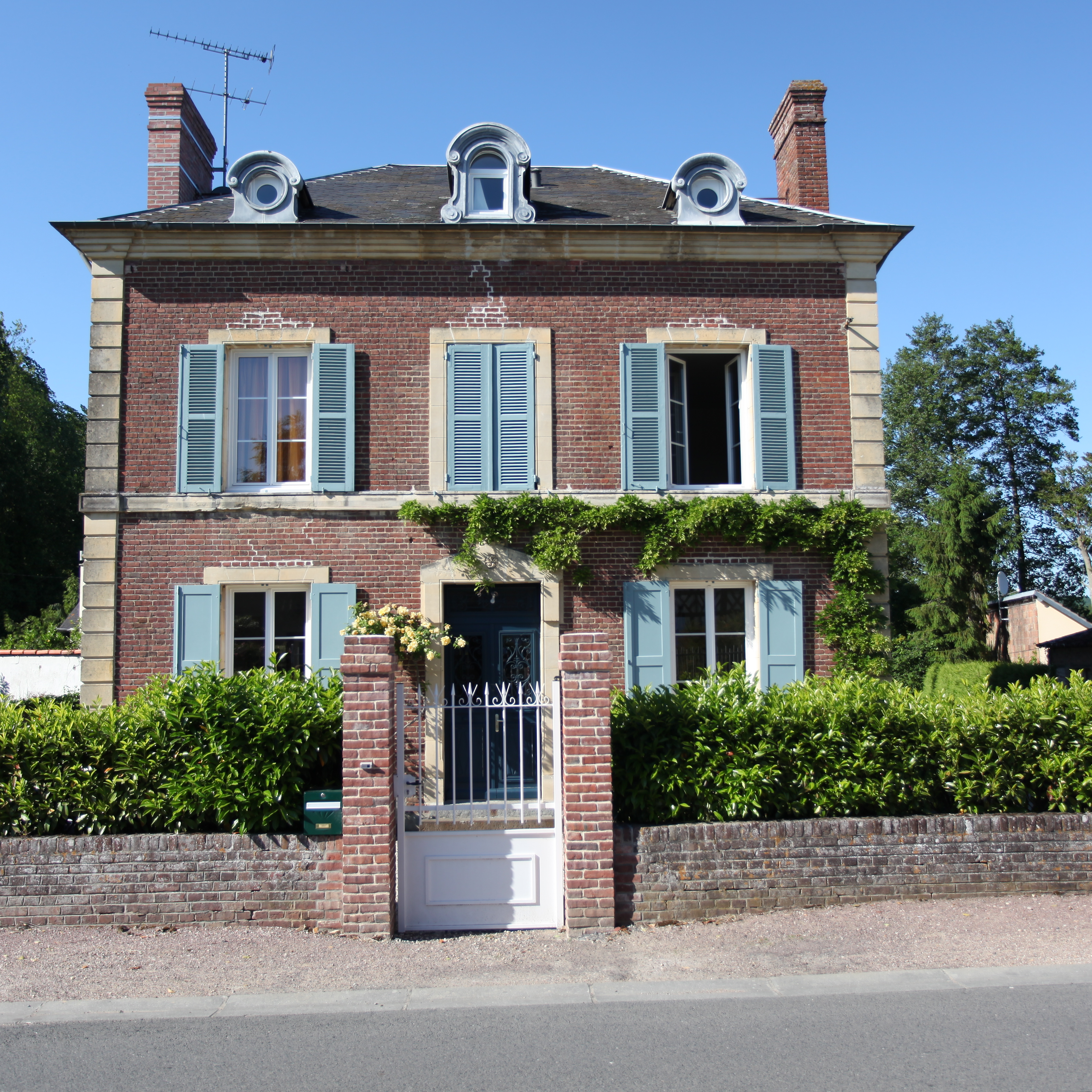
- Former rectory

- Coat of arms
- Location of Saint-Julien-le-Faucon
- Location within France Location within Normandy
- Coordinates: 49°06′03″N 0°05′19″E
- Country: France
- Region: Normandy
- Department: Calvados
- Arrondissement: Lisieux
- Canton: Mézidon Vallée d'Auge
- Commune: Mézidon Vallée d'Auge
- Area^{1}: 3.22 km^{2} (1.24 sq mi)
- Elevation: 33 m (108 ft)
- Highest elevation: 73 m (240 ft)
- Lowest elevation: 29 m (95 ft)
- Population (2023): 751
  - Density: 233/km^{2} (604/sq mi)
- Time zone: UTC+01:00 (CET)
  - Summer (DST): UTC+02:00 (CEST)
- Postal code: 14140
- ^{1} French Land Register data, which excludes lakes, ponds, glaciers > 1 km^{2} (0.386 sq mi or 247 acres) and river estuaries.

Saint-Julien-le-Faucon (French pronunciation: [sɛ̃ ʒyljɛ̃ lə fokɔ̃]) is a former commune in the Calvados department in the Normandy region in northwestern France. On 1 January 2017, it was merged into the new commune Mézidon Vallée d'Auge.

== See also ==
- Communes of the Calvados department
