= Magny-le-Freule =

- Part of Mézidon Vallée d'Auge
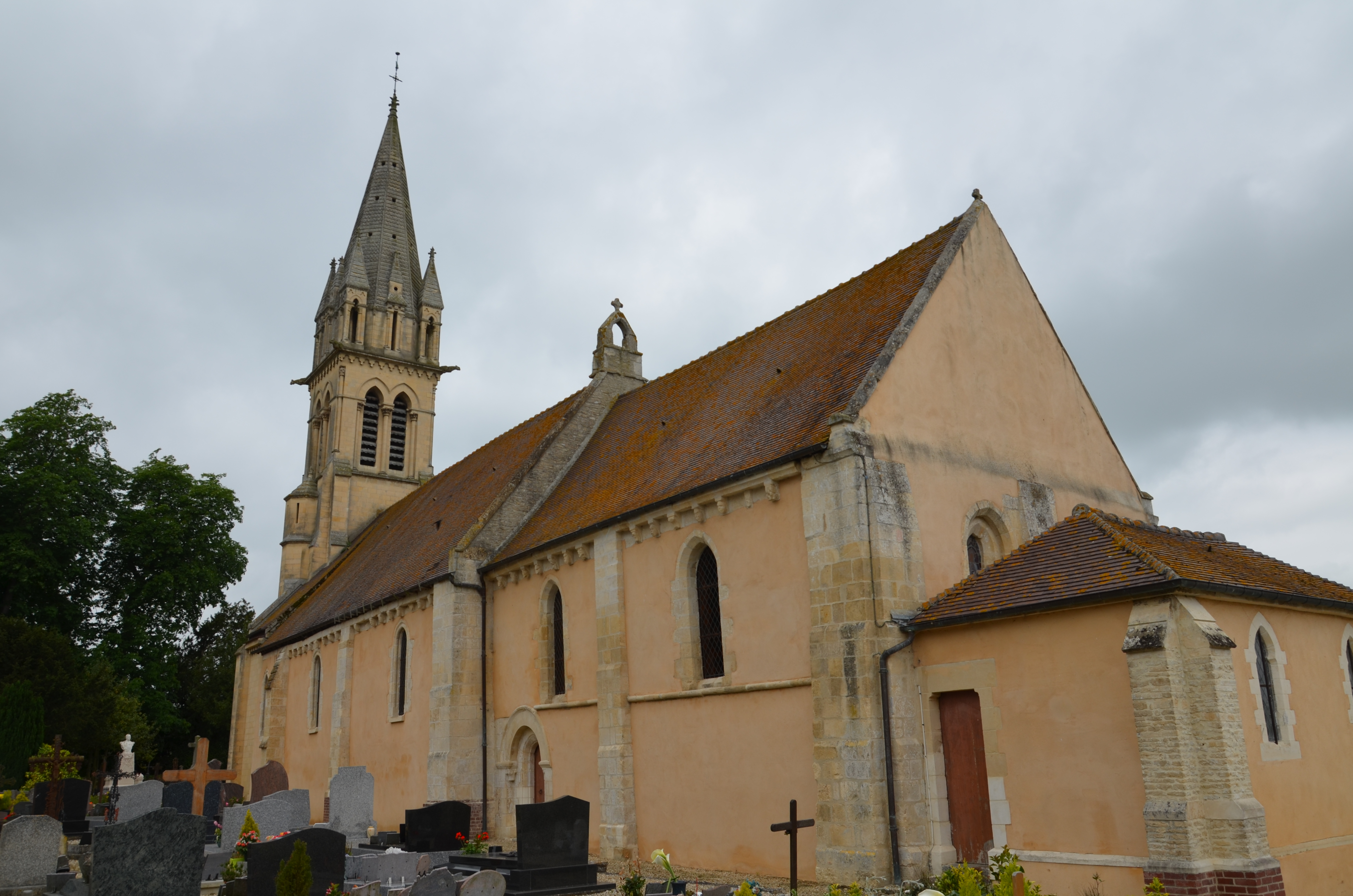

- Coat of arms
- Location of Magny-le-Freule
- Location within France Location within Normandy
- Coordinates: 49°06′01″N 0°04′13″W
- Country: France
- Region: Normandy
- Department: Calvados
- Arrondissement: Lisieux
- Canton: Mézidon Vallée d'Auge
- Commune: Mézidon Vallée d'Auge
- Area^{1}: 6.38 km^{2} (2.46 sq mi)
- Elevation: 13 m (43 ft)
- Highest elevation: 72 m (236 ft)
- Lowest elevation: 6 m (20 ft)
- Population (2023): 317
  - Density: 49.7/km^{2} (129/sq mi)
- Time zone: UTC+01:00 (CET)
  - Summer (DST): UTC+02:00 (CEST)
- Postal code: 14270
- ^{1} French Land Register data, which excludes lakes, ponds, glaciers > 1 km^{2} (0.386 sq mi or 247 acres) and river estuaries.

Magny-le Freule (French pronunciation: [maɲi lə fʁœl]) is a former commune in the Calvados department in the Normandy region in northwestern France. On 1 January 2017, it was merged into the new commune Mézidon Vallée d'Auge.

== See also ==
- Communes of the Calvados department
