= Le Mesnil-Mauger =

- Part of Mézidon Vallée d'Auge
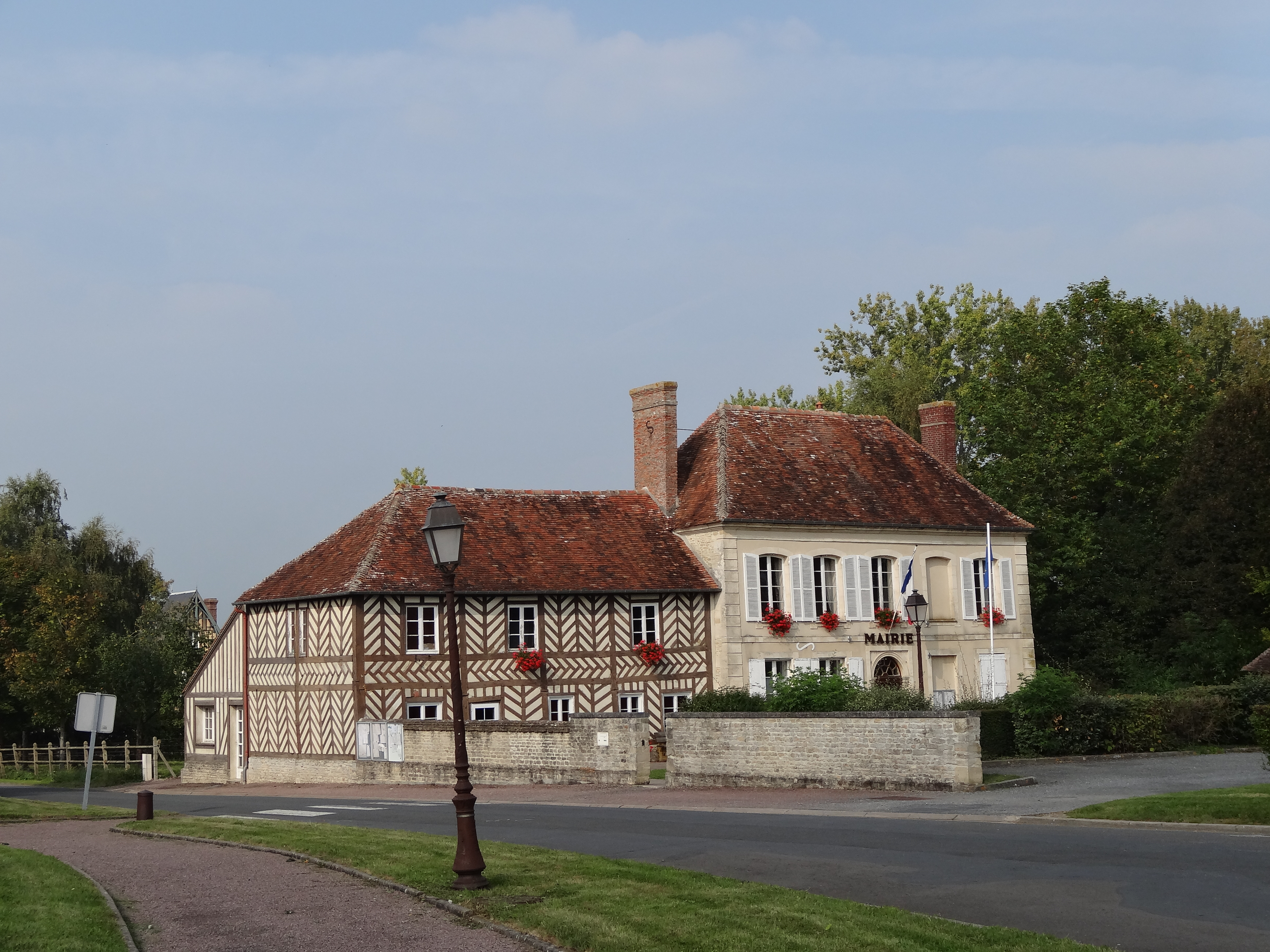
- Location of Le Mesnil-Mauger
- Location within France Location within Normandy
- Coordinates: 49°05′14″N 0°01′08″E
- Country: France
- Region: Normandy
- Department: Calvados
- Arrondissement: Lisieux
- Canton: Mézidon Vallée d'Auge
- Commune: Mézidon Vallée d'Auge
- Area^{1}: 31.24 km^{2} (12.06 sq mi)
- Elevation: 45 m (148 ft)
- Highest elevation: 78 m (256 ft)
- Lowest elevation: 10 m (33 ft)
- Population (2023): 952
  - Density: 30.5/km^{2} (78.9/sq mi)
- Time zone: UTC+01:00 (CET)
  - Summer (DST): UTC+02:00 (CEST)
- Postal code: 14270
- ^{1} French Land Register data, which excludes lakes, ponds, glaciers > 1 km^{2} (0.386 sq mi or 247 acres) and river estuaries.

Le Mesnil-Mauger (French pronunciation: [lə menil moʒe]) is a commune in the Calvados department in the Normandy region in northwestern France. On 1 January 2017, it was merged into the new commune Mézidon Vallée d'Auge.

== See also ==
- Communes of the Calvados department
