= Magny-la-Campagne =

- Part of Mézidon Vallée d'Auge
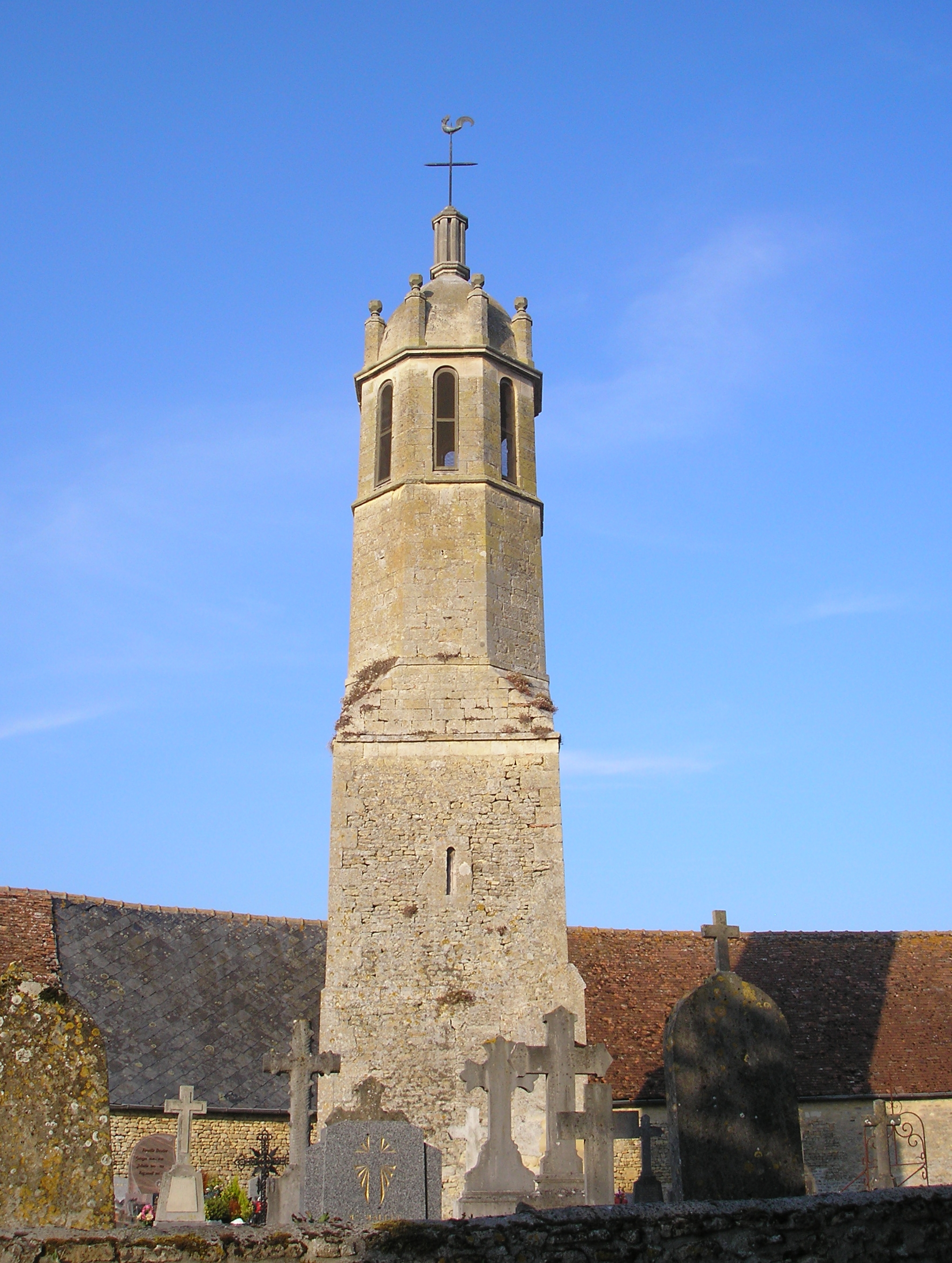
- Location of Magny-la-Campagne
- Location within France Location within Normandy
- Coordinates: 49°02′59″N 0°06′09″W
- Country: France
- Region: Normandy
- Department: Calvados
- Arrondissement: Caen
- Canton: Mézidon Vallée d'Auge
- Commune: Mézidon Vallée d'Auge
- Area^{1}: 6.26 km^{2} (2.42 sq mi)
- Elevation: 49 m (161 ft)
- Highest elevation: 61 m (200 ft)
- Lowest elevation: 23 m (75 ft)
- Population (2023): 667
  - Density: 107/km^{2} (276/sq mi)
- Time zone: UTC+01:00 (CET)
  - Summer (DST): UTC+02:00 (CEST)
- Postal code: 14270
- ^{1} French Land Register data, which excludes lakes, ponds, glaciers > 1 km^{2} (0.386 sq mi or 247 acres) and river estuaries.

Magny-la-Campagne (French pronunciation: [maɲi la kɑ̃paɲ]) is a former commune in the Calvados department in the Normandy region in northwestern France. On 1 January 2017, it was merged into the new commune Mézidon Vallée d'Auge.

== See also ==
- Communes of the Calvados department
