= Route nationale 427 =

French road

National road 427
- Route nationale 427

Route information
- Length: 40 km (25 mi)

Major junctions
- West end: Route Nationale 60 at Thonnance-lès-Joinville
- Route Départementale 25 at Germay; Route Départementale 19 at Trampot
- East end: Route Nationale 65 at Liffol-le-Grand

Location
- Country: France

Highway system
- Roads in France; Autoroutes; Routes nationales

The Route Nationale 427 is a French road which linked Thonnance-les-Joinville to Liffol-le-Grand.

This road is 40 km long and crossed the departments of Haute-Marne and Vosges and the regions of Champagne-Ardenne and Lorraine.

In 1972, this road had been downgraded to D427.

== Route ==
- Thonnance-les-Joinville (Haute-Marne) (km 0)
- Suzannecourt (Haute-Marne) (km 1)
- Poissons (Haute-Marne) (km 5)
- Noncourt-sur-le-Rongeant (Haute-Marne) (km 7)
- Thonnance-les-Moulins (Haute-Marne) (km 11)
- Germay (Haute-Marne) (km 17)
- Trampot (Vosges) (km 26)
- Aillianville (Haute-Marne) (km 30)
- Liffol-le-Grand (Vosges) (km 40)
