= 8th Reconnaissance Squadron =

8th Reconnaissance Squadron may refer to:

- The 887th Tactical Missile Squadron, designated the 8th Reconnaissance Squadron (Light) from January 1941 to August 1941
- The 98th Air Refueling Squadron, designated the 8th Reconnaissance Squadron (Medium) from February 1942 to April 1942
- The 8th Reconnaissance Squadron, Special (Provisional), from March 1944 - August 1944 (a predecessor of the 654th Bombardment Squadron)

== See also ==
- The 8th Photographic Reconnaissance Squadron
- The 8th Tactical Reconnaissance Squadron (July 1945 - February 1946)
- The 8th Tactical Reconnaissance Squadron (August 1948 - 1951)
- The 8th Weather Reconnaissance Squadron, Heavy (Provisional), from March 1944 - August 1944 (a predecessor of the 652d Bombardment Squadron)
- The 8th Weather Reconnaissance Squadron, Light (Provisional), from March 1944 - August 1944 (a predecessor of the 653d Bombardment Squadron)
