= 482nd Attack Squadron =

482nd Attack Squadron

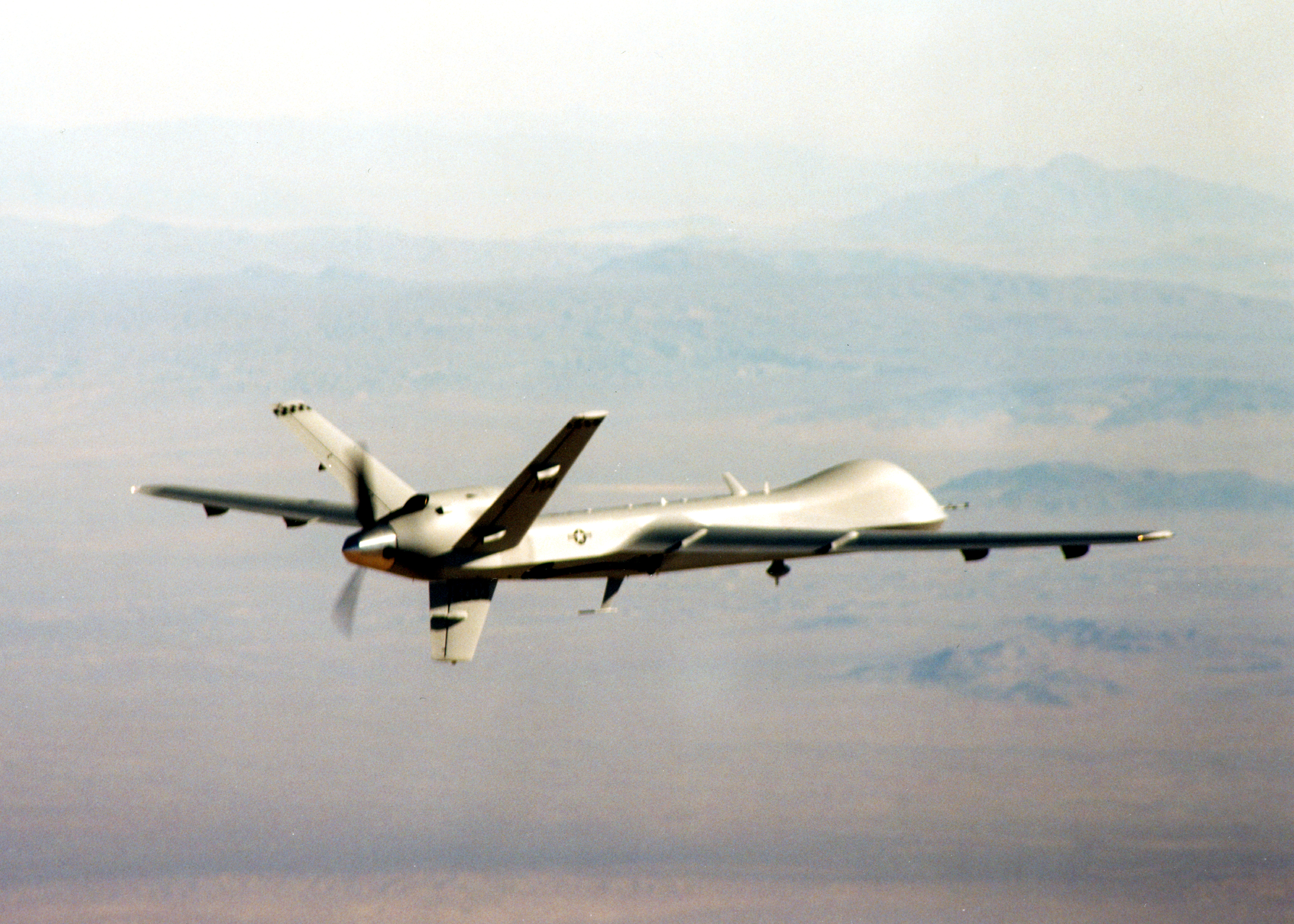
- MQ-9 Reaper in flight
- Active: 1917–1919; 1925–1942; 1944–1946; 2018–present
- Country: United States
- Branch: United States Air Force
- Role: Unmanned aerial vehicle operations
- Part of: Air Combat Command
- Garrison/HQ: Shaw Air Force Base, South Carolina
- Motto: Aut Vinci Aut Mori (Latin for 'Either Conquer or Die') (2019–present)
- Engagements: World War I Pacific Ocean Theater
- Decorations: Distinguished Unit Citation; Air Force Meritorious Unit Award; Air Force Outstanding Unit Award

Insignia
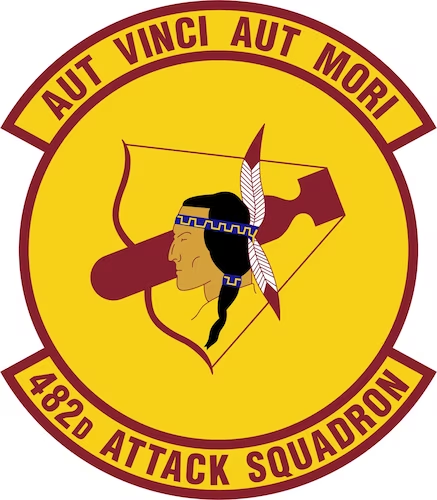
- 482nd Attack Squadron emblem (Note: Modified on 20 August 2019.)

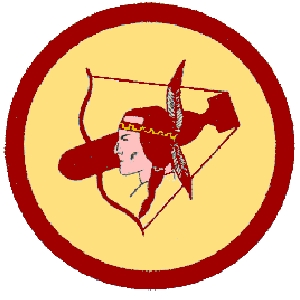
- 482nd Bombardment Squadron emblem (Note: Approved 16 December 1944. Description: On a gold disc, wide border dark red brown, an aerial bomb in drawn bow, all of the last [color mentioned], pointing toward dexter base, surmounted by a side view of an Indian head, proper, with head band and plait loop red brown, trimmed gold, holding two white feathers tipped and trimmed red brown in the headdress.)

The 482nd Attack Squadron is a United States Air Force unit, stationed at Shaw Air Force Base, South Carolina, where it is an operational squadron of the 25th Attack Group, operating the General Atomics MQ-9 Reaper unmanned aerial vehicle.

The first predecessor of the squadron was organized in 1917 as the 70th Aero Squadron. After being redesignated as the 482nd Aero Squadron, it deployed to France as a construction unit, returning to the United States in 1919, where it was demobilized.

The second predecessor of the squadron was the 482nd Bombardment Squadron, which was constituted in the Organized Reserve in 1924. The two units were consolidated in 1936 and, along with other reserve units, disbanded in May 1942, shortly after the United States entered World War II.

In 1944, the 482nd Bombardment Squadron, Very Heavy was activated and assigned to the 505th Bombardment Group. Shortly after it was activated, the two 482nd Bombardment Squadrons were consolidated. After training in the United States, it served in the strategic bombing campaign against Japan with Boeing B-29 Superfortresses, earning two Distinguished Unit Citations. Following V-J Day, it was inactivated at Clark Field, Philippines in June 1946. It was redesignated as an attack unit and activated in October 2018.

== Mission ==
The squadron mission is to train General Atomics MQ-9 Reaper crews outside of combat missions. It also operates Reapers in the United States Central Command and United States European Command areas of responsibility.

== History ==
=== World War I ===
The first predecessor of the squadron was established at Kelly Field, Texas in August 1917 as the 70th Aero Squadron. (Note: After the squadron was renumbered as the 482nd, a second 70th Aero Squadron was organized at the end of February 1918 at Ellington Field. Texas. It was redesignated Squadron B, Ellington Field in July 1918 and Flying School Detachment, Ellington Field in December. The detachment was demobilized in September 1919 and later (27 July 1932) consolidated with the 70th Service Squadron. Clay 1422-3.) While at Camp Morrison, Virginia, the squadron was renumbered along with other aero squadrons that were construction units as the 482nd Aero Squadron. The squadron was a civil engineering organization at the Western Front constructing airfields and related facilities in the Zone of Advance from its arrival in France in March 1918 until the Armistice on 11 November. It remained in France until early 1919 when it returned to the United States and was demobilized at Garden City, New York.

=== Organized reserves ===
The 482nd Bombardment Squadron was organized at Baltimore, Maryland as a reserve unit in March 1925. It was inactivated in July 1929. The unit was consolidated with the 482nd Aero Squadron in 1936, but remained in inactive status until the end of May 1942, when it was disbanded along with all other Organized Reserve units.

=== World War II ===
==== Organization and training ====
The second 482nd Bombardment Squadron was activated at Dalhart Army Air Field, Texas in March 1944 as a Boeing B-29 Superfortress very heavy bombardment squadron, drawing its initial cadre from the 9th Bombardment Group. It moved to Harvard Army Air Field, Nebraska the following day, where the squadron began training with Boeing B-17 Flying Fortresses on 1 July until B-29s became available. The following month, it was consolidated with the reserve 482nd Bombardment Squadron that had been disbanded in 1942. The squadron trained for combat with B-29s until leaving Harvard for the Pacific on 6 November 1944.

The squadron's ground echelon sailed from the Seattle Port of Embarkation for the Pacific on 14 November. The air echelon staged through Hamilton Field and Mather Field, California with its B-29s.

==== Combat Operations ====
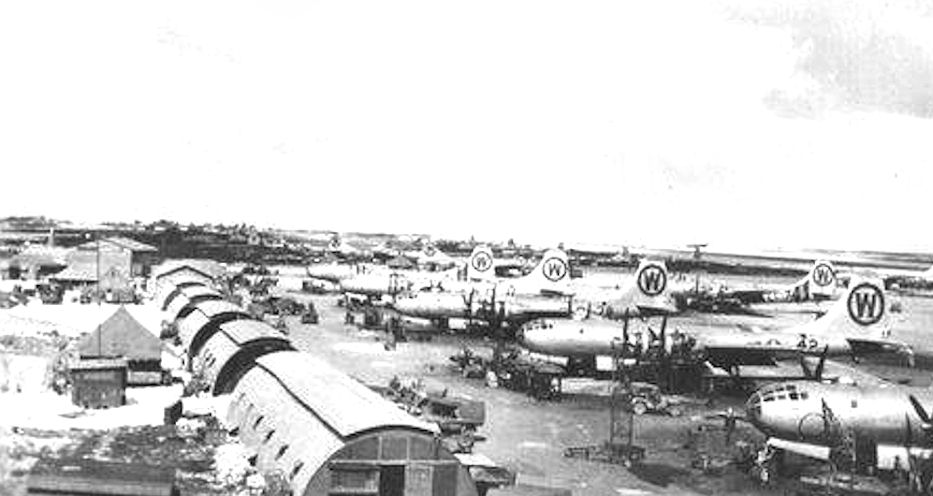
505th Bombardment Group B-29 Superfortresses at North Field, Tinian

The squadron arrived at its combat station, North Field (Tinian) in the Mariana Islands on 24 December 1944. Three days later, it began flying training missions, including an attack on Moen Airfield in January. It flew its first combat mission on 24 January 1945 against targets on Iwo Jima and the Truk Islands. It began operations flying high altitude daylight missions, engaging in the strategic bombing campaign against Japan. On 10 February, it flew a strike on the Nakajima Aircraft Company factory at Ota, for which it was awarded a Distinguished Unit Citation (DUC). The 505th Group lost eight B-29s on the mission, but most were lost due to operational problems, rather than enemy action. However, The results of high altitude B-29 raids on Japan were disappointing. From 19 January, no mission had been able to bomb visually, and radar bombing results were generally unsatisfactory. Low altitude night area attacks with incendiaries promised better results, for XXI Bomber Command. The switch in tactics began with the launch of a raid against Tokyo on 9 March 1945.

The squadron conducted area raids with incendiaries until August 1945. During April 1945, the squadron was diverted from the strategic campaign against Japan to support Operation Iceberg, the invasion of Okinawa. It struck Miyazaki Airfield and Kanoya Airfield, bases from which kamikaze attacks were being launched. These bases were located on Kyushu, only 300 miles from Okinawa. The attacks directly impacted kamikaze launches, but also forced the Japanese military to retain fighter aircraft to defend the Japanese Special Attack Units that otherwise might have been used to challenge air superiority over Okinawa. (Note: 75% of Twentieth Air Force's missions in April and May 1945 were flown to support Operation Iceberg. Cate & Olson p. 631.)

The squadron also conducted aerial mining operations against Japanese shipping. The 505th was the only group in XXI Bomber Command to carry out these missions, which began on 27 March. On 17 June, the squadron concentrated its efforts on the mining campaign. It received a second DUC for mining the Shimonoseki Strait and harbors in the Inland Sea between 17 June and 1 July 1945. The squadron flew its last mission on the night of 14 and 15 August 1945. Following V-J Day its B-29s carried relief supplies to Allied prisoner of war camps. It also flew show of force flights and conducted bomb damage assessment flights over Japan. It moved to Clark Field in the Philippines in March 1946, and was inactivated there on 15 June 1946.

=== Unmanned vehicle operations ===
The squadron was redesignated the 482nd Attack Squadron and activated at Shaw Air Force Base, South Carolina, where it is equipped with the General Atomics MQ-9 Reaper and is one of two operational squadrons of the 25th Attack Group. Through 2021, the 25th Group focused on anti-terrorism operations in the United States Central Command area of responsibility. In February 2021, it participated in an exercise with the Romanian Air Force as it began to build up its capability to operate in the United States European Command area as well.

== Lineage ==
482nd Aero Squadron

- Organized as the 70th Aero Squadron on 13 August 1917

Redesignated 482nd Aero Squadron (Construction) on 1 February 1918
Demobilized on 8 February 1919
Reconstituted and consolidated with the 482nd Bombardment Squadron on 2 December 1936

482nd Bombardment Squadron

- Constituted as the 482nd Bombardment Squadron on 31 March 1924 and allotted to the Organized Reserve

Activated in March 1925
Inactivated 23 July 1929
Consolidated with the 482nd Aero Squadron on 2 December 1936
Disbanded on 31 May 1942

- Reconstituted and consolidated with the 482nd Bombardment Squadron, Very Heavy on 21 April 1944

482nd Attack Squadron

- Constituted as the 482nd Bombardment Squadron, Very Heavy on 28 February 1944

Activated on 11 March 1944

- Consolidated with the 482nd Bombardment Squadron on 21 April 1944

Inactivated on 30 Jun 1946

- Redesignated 482nd Attack Squadron on 13 February 2018

Activated on 2 October 2018

=== Assignments ===
- Unknown, 15 August 1917 – March 1918 (Note: Probably to Post Headquarters, Kelly Field until December 1917, Aeronautical Supply Depot & Concentration Camp until March 1918.)
- Advance Section, Service of Supply, March 1918 – December 1918
- Unknown, December 1918 – 8 February 1919
- Allotted to Third Corps Area, 31 March 1924 – 31 May 1942
- 347th Bombardment Group, March 1925 – 23 July 1929
- 505th Bombardment Group, 11 March 1944 – 30 June 1946
- 25th Attack Group, 2 October 2018 – present

=== Stations ===
- Kelly Field, Texas, 13 August 1917
- Camp Morrison, Virginia, 21 December 1917 - 4 March 1918
- Colombey-les-Belles Airdrome, France, 27 March 1918
- Autreville Aerodrome, France, 28 March 1918
- Trampot, France, c. 9 July 1918
- Longeaux Aerodrome (Haute-Marne), France, 22 September 1918
- Trampot, France, c. 24 October 1918
- Braux, France, c. 22 November 1918
- Pont Rousseau, France, 25 December 1918 – unknown
- Garden City, New York, c. 8 – 18 March 1919
- Baltimore, Maryland, c. March 1925 – 23 July 1929
- Dalhart Army Air Field, Texas, 11 March 1944
- Harvard Army Air Field, Nebraska, 12 March – 6 November 1944
- North Field, Tinian, 24 December 1944 – 5 March 1946
- Clark Field, Luzon, Philippines, 14 March – 30 June 1946
- Shaw Air Force Base, South Carolina, 2 October 2018 – present

=== Aircraft ===
- Boeing B-17 Flying Fortress, 1944
- Boeing B-29 Superfortress, 1944–1946
- General Atomics MQ-9 Reaper, 2018

=== Awards and campaigns ===
Award streamer	Award	Dates	Notes
	Distinguished Unit Citation	10 February 1945	Ota, Japan 482nd Bombardment Squadron
	Distinguished Unit Citation	17 June – 1 July 1945	Japan 482nd Bombardment Squadron
	Air Force Meritorious Unit Award	1 June 2018 – 31 May 2020	482nd Attack Squadron
	Air Force Outstanding Unit Award	1 June 2019 – 1 May 2021	482nd Attack Squadron

Campaign Streamer	Campaign	Dates	Notes
	Theater of Operations	27 March 1918–1919	482nd Aero Squadron
	Air Offensive, Japan	24 December 1944–2 September 1945	482nd Bombardment Squadron
	Western Pacific	17 April 1945–2 September 1945	482nd Bombardment Squadron
	Eastern Mandates	7 December 1943–14 April 1944	482nd Bombardment Squadron (Note: Campaign credit awarded for combat operations in the area, although outside the official period of the campaign.)

== See also ==
- List of American Aero Squadrons
- B-17 Flying Fortress units of the United States Army Air Forces
- List of B-29 Superfortress operators
