= Trampot =

- Commune
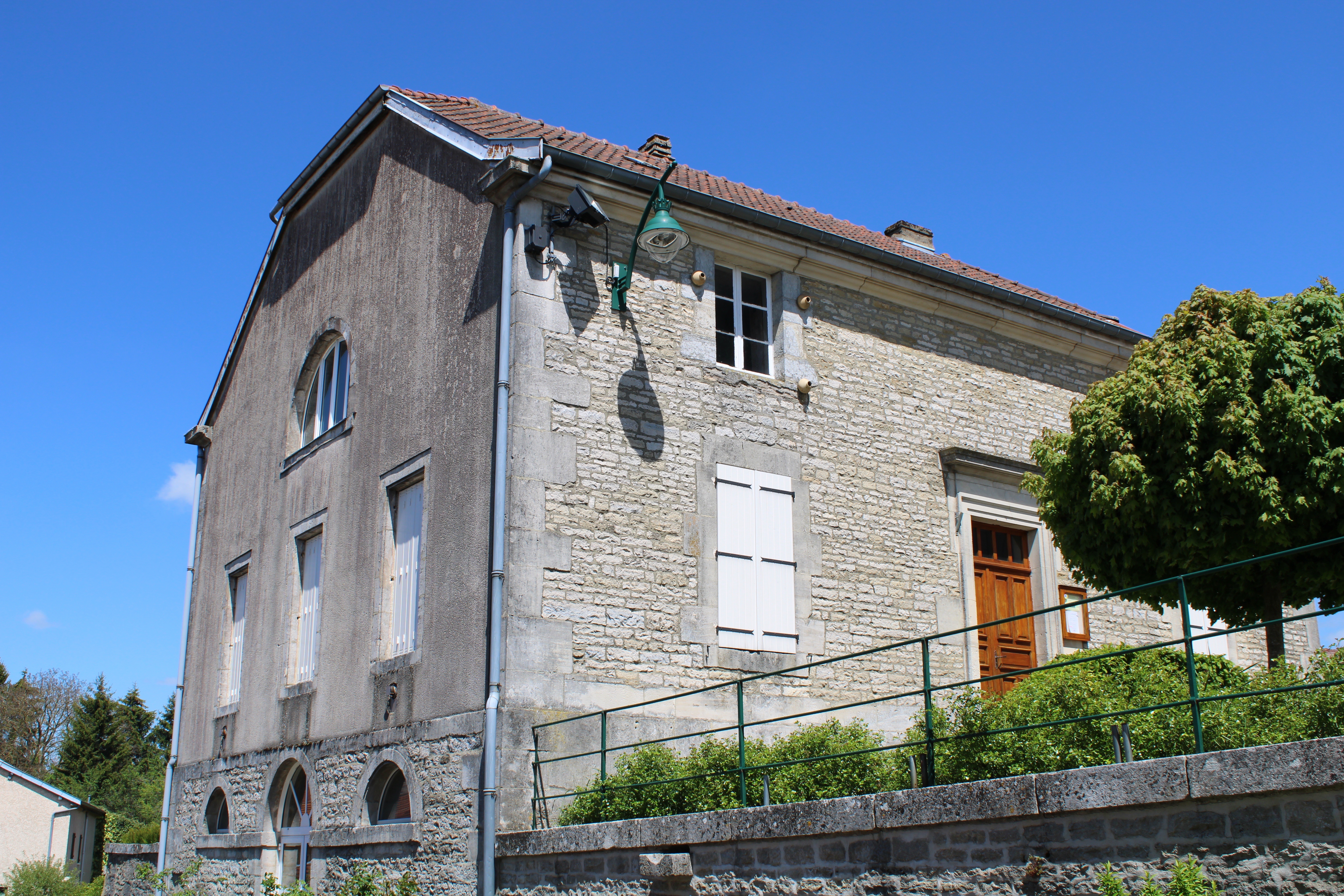
- The town hall in Trampot

- Coat of arms
- Location of Trampot
- Location within France Location within Grand Est
- Coordinates: 48°21′45″N 5°26′15″E
- Country: France
- Region: Grand Est
- Department: Vosges
- Arrondissement: Neufchâteau
- Canton: Neufchâteau
- Intercommunality: CC l'Ouest Vosgien

Government
  - Mayor (2020–2026): Didier Maginel
- Area^{1}: 13.14 km^{2} (5.07 sq mi)
- Elevation: 384 m (1,260 ft)
- Highest elevation: 441 m (1,447 ft)
- Lowest elevation: 364 m (1,194 ft)
- Population (2023): 99
  - Density: 7.5/km^{2} (20/sq mi)
- Time zone: UTC+01:00 (CET)
  - Summer (DST): UTC+02:00 (CEST)
- INSEE/Postal code: 88477 /88350
- ^{1} French Land Register data, which excludes lakes, ponds, glaciers > 1 km^{2} (0.386 sq mi or 247 acres) and river estuaries.

Trampot (French pronunciation: [tʁɑ̃po]) is a commune in the Vosges department of Lorraine in northeastern France.

== Geography ==
Trampot is located at the border of the Haute-Marne departement.

The village is crossed by the Route nationale 427, which links it to Joinville (28 km) and Liffol-le-Grand (13 km).

== History ==
1820 : Project of fusion of the villages of Trampot and Brechainville
1839 : Route nationale 427 was built
1923 : Electricity arrives on the village
1957 : Creation of the village school
1986 : Closing of the village school

== Mayors of Trampot ==
Mayor	Mandate
Alexandre Mongin	until April 1900
Joseph Chicanaux	1900–1905
Thimothé Berthinet	1905–1908
Prosper Mathieu	1908–1912
Adolphe Vaillant	1912–1917
Emile Mongin	1917–1922
Camille Mongin	1922–1924
Albert Mongin	1924
Henri Bourgeois	1924–1929
Henri Vouton	1929–1953
André Mangin	1953–1958
Paul Bai	1958–1974
Robert Mathieu	1974–1995
Bernard Mongin	1995–2008
André Schoindre	2008–2014
Didier Maginel	2014–present

== Monuments ==
- The church Saint Paul and Saint Pierre has been a historical monument since 3 September 2010.

== See also ==
- Communes of the Vosges department
