= 25th Attack Wing =

25th Attack wing

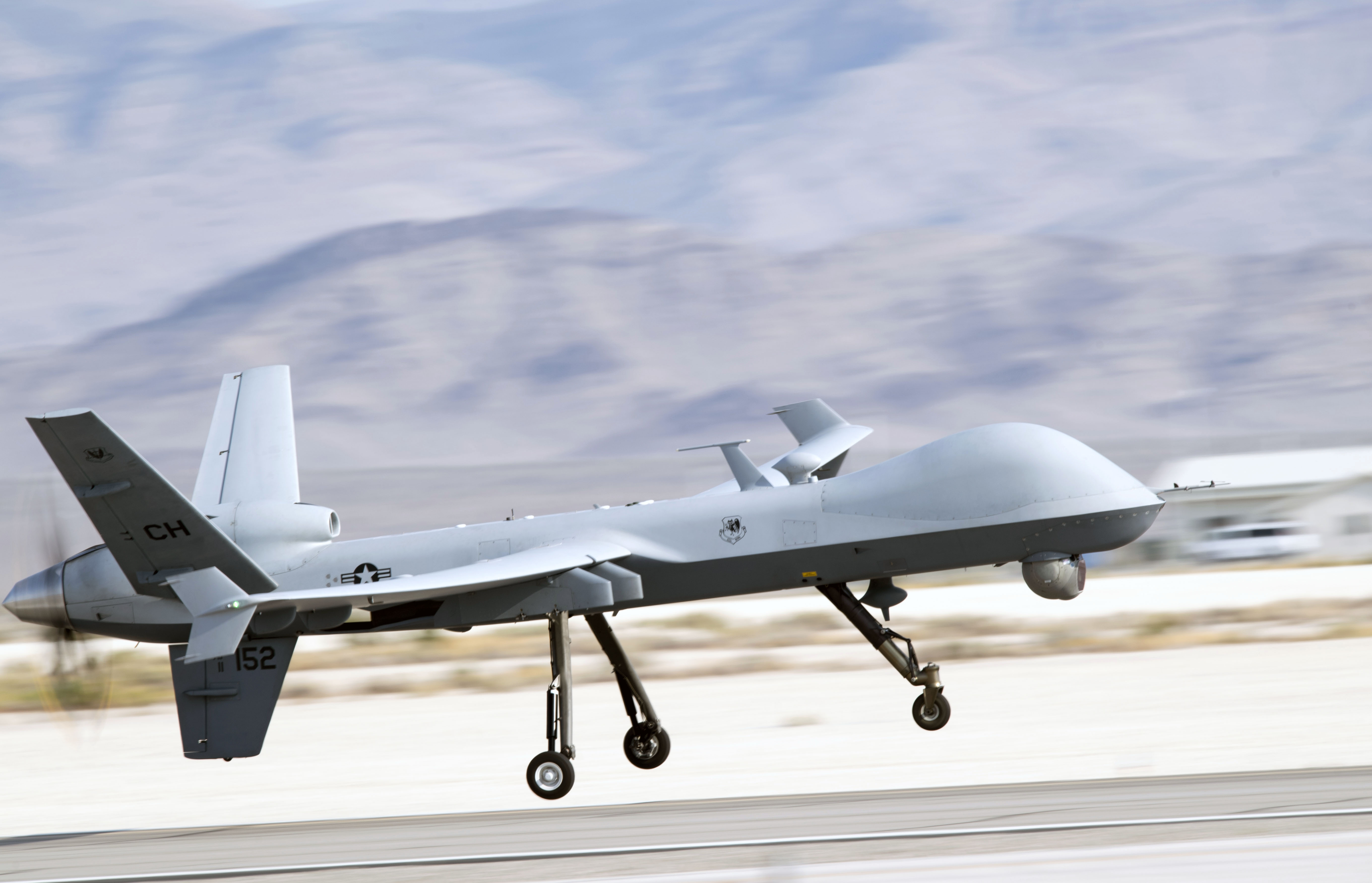
- An MQ-9 Reaper takes off from Creech AFB
- Active: 1940–1944; 1944–1945; 1965–1966; 2018–present
- Country: United States
- Branch: United States Air Force
- Role: Unmanned attack
- Part of: Air Combat Command
- Garrison/HQ: Shaw Air Force Base
- Motto: Guard With Power
- Engagements: Antisubmarine Campaign; European Theater of Operations
- Decorations: Air Force Meritorious Unit Award; Air Force Outstanding Unit Award

Insignia
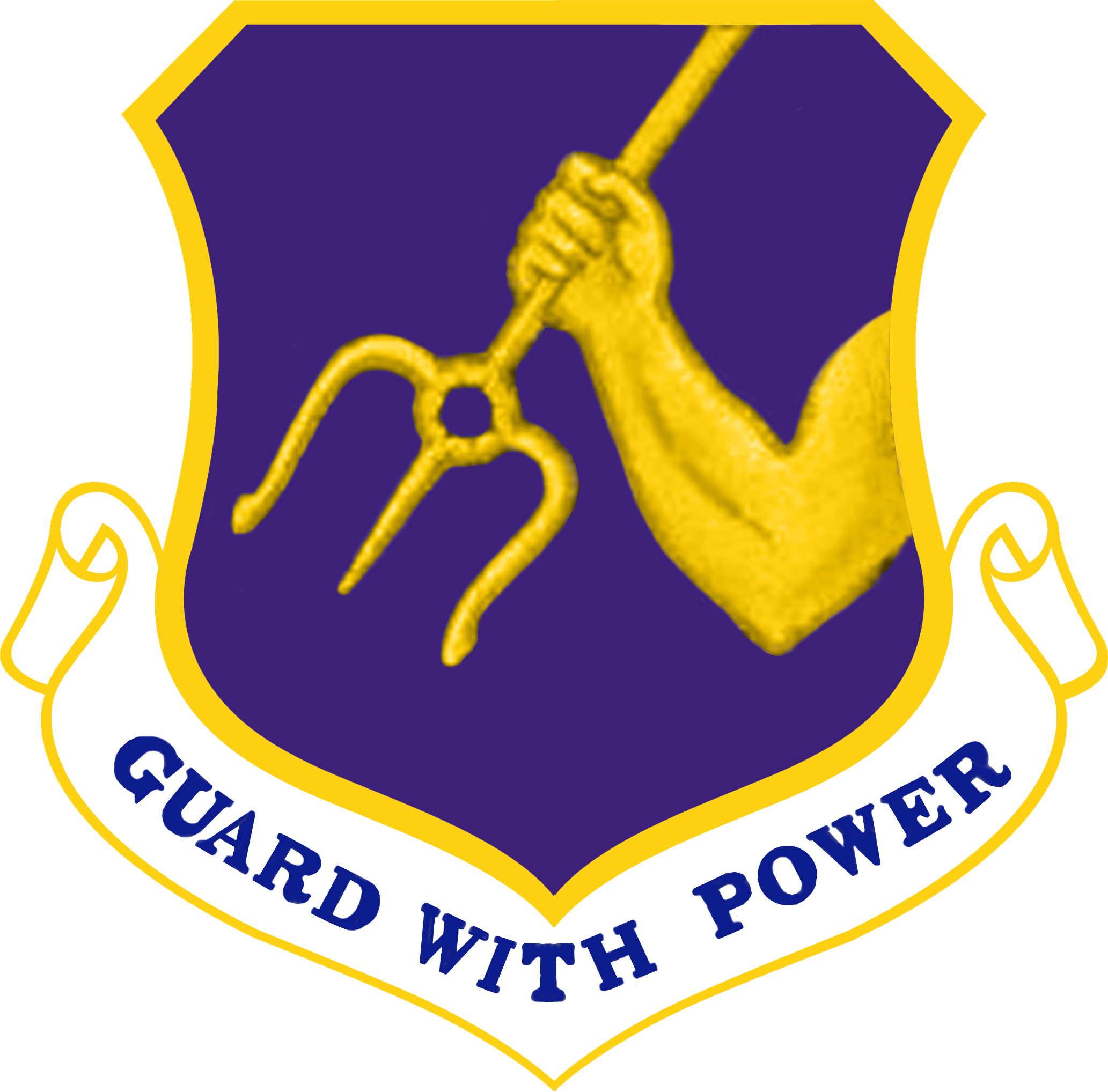
- 25th Attack Wing emblem (Note: Used from October 1965.)

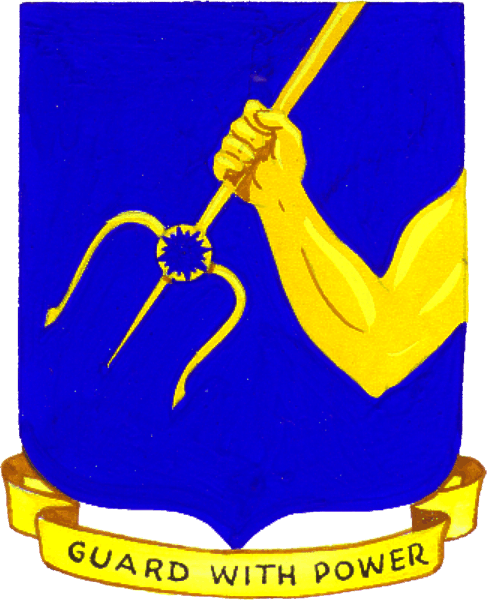
- 25th Bombardment Group (Medium) emblem (Note: Approved 3 October 1940. Description: Azure, issuing out of sinister side an arm embowed grasping a trident bend sinisterwise prongs to base or, on and over the junction of shaft and prong a compass rose of the first [color mentioned] on a background of the second [color mentioned].)

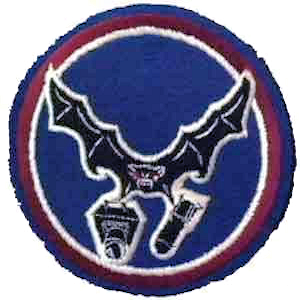
- Patch of 654 Bomb Squadron (Special), 25th Bombardment Group, Reconnaissance emblem (Note: Maurer, Combat Units, p. 77 indicates the 25th Bombardment Group, Reconnaissance had no approved emblem.)

The 25th Attack Wing is an active United States Air Force unit, stationed at Shaw Air Force Base, South Carolina. It was activated in February 2018 as the 25th Attack Group to operate unmanned aerial vehicles and was assigned to the 432d Wing, located at Creech Air Force Base, Nevada. In 2025, it was upgraded to a flying wing, adding operations and maintenance units and expanding its mission to become the lead General Atomics MQ-9 Reaper organization for the Air Force.

The wing was previously active as the 25th Tactical Reconnaissance Wing at Chambley Air Base, France as an element of United States Air Forces Europe. The wing replaced the 25th Tactical Reconnaissance Group at Chambley. The group was formed in 1965 by the consolidation of the 25th Bombardment Group (Medium) and the 25th Bombardment Group, Reconnaissance.

The first 25th Bombardment Group performed anti-submarine warfare missions in the Caribbean Sea following the entry of the United States into World War II. This group was disbanded in 1944 after the threat of German U-boats lessened and an attack on the Panama Canal became unlikely. Later in 1944 the second 25th Bombardment Group was organized to perform weather and special reconnaissance missions from England during World War II for United States Strategic Air Forces over Europe and the Atlantic approaches to the British Isles. In 1985 the wing and group were consolidated.

== Composition ==
Although the 25th Attack Group is headquartered at Shaw Air Force Base, the group comprises squadrons in various locations:

- Whiteman Air Force Base, Missouri
  - 20th Attack Squadron
- Creech Air Force Base, Nevada
  - 11th Attack Squadron
  - 42nd Attack Squadron
  - Three maintenance squadrons
- Ellsworth Air Force Base, South Dakota
  - 89th Attack Squadron
- Shaw Air Force Base, South Carolina
  - 25th Operations Support Squadron
  - 50th Attack Squadron
  - 482d Attack Squadron

== History ==
=== World War II ===
==== Antisubmarine Warfare in the Caribbean Sea ====
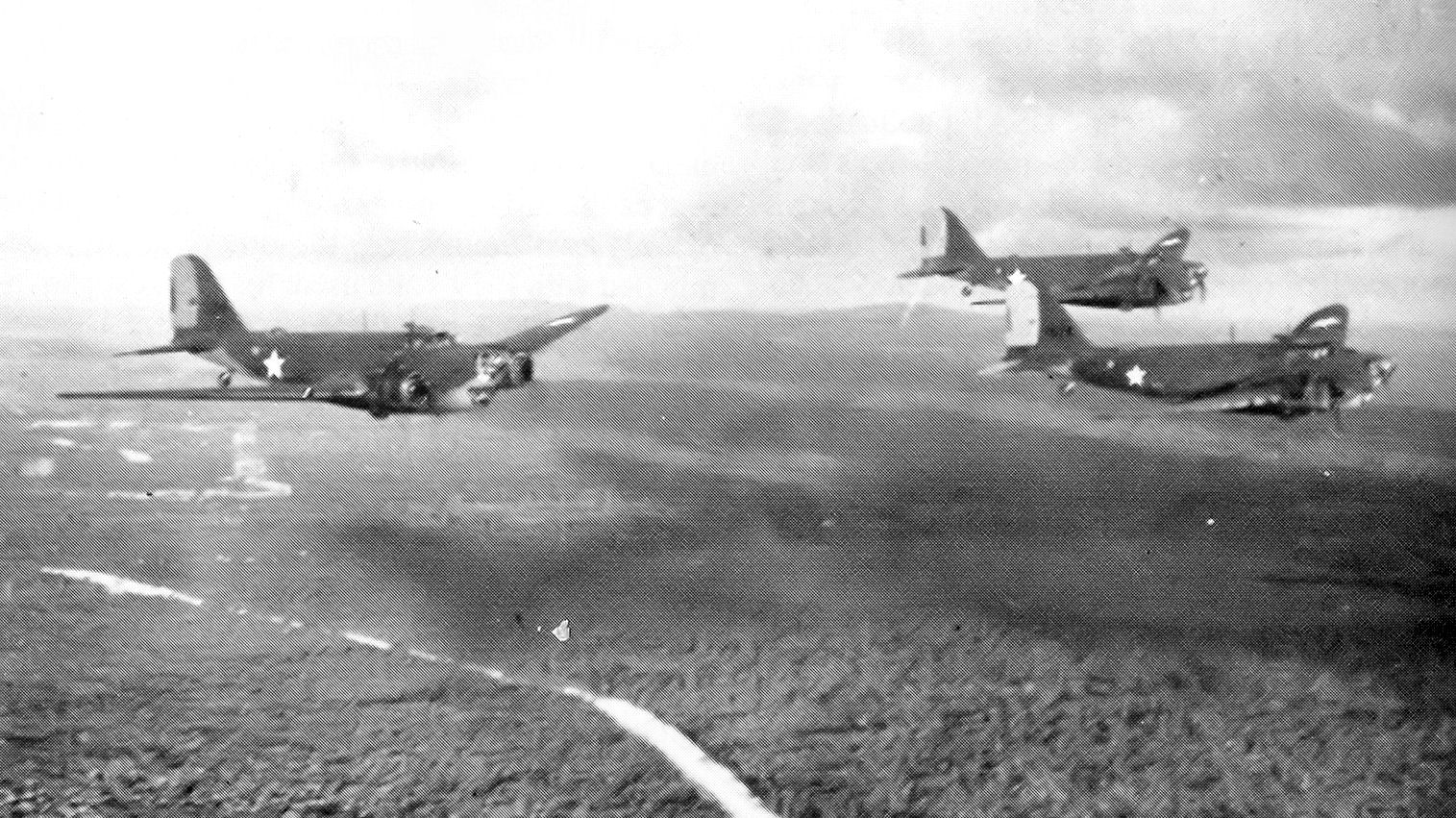
B-18s of the 12th Bombardment Squadron flying over British Guiana

The first predecessor of the wing was the 25th Bombardment Group, which was activated at Langley Field, Virginia during the buildup of the Air Corps prior to the entry of the United States into World War II, with the 10th, 12th, and 35th Bombardment Squadrons as its original components. Most of the cadre for the group was drawn from the 2d Bombardment Group at Langley. Although initially designated as a heavy bomber unit, the group trained with Northrop A-17 light bombers and Douglas B-18 Bolo medium bombers (although the 10th Squadron briefly had a few Boeing B-17 Flying Fortresses on hand).

In late October 1940, the 25th sailed on the USAT Hunter Liggett for Borinquen Field, Puerto Rico, along with the newly-organized 13th Composite Wing. Upon their arrival in Puerto Rico on 1 November, the group was assigned to the 13th Wing and had the 27th Reconnaissance Squadron, which had been at Borinquen since 1939, attached to it from the Puerto Rican Department. In April 1941, the group provided the initial cadre for the 40th Bombardment Group, which was activated at Borinquen, losing almost half of its personnel to form the new group.

The group participated in the defense of the Antilles, and after the commencement of hostilities, escorted convoys and conducted antisubmarine patrols. Shortly before the entry of the United States into World War II, in November, the group dispersed two of its squadrons to increase its coverage, with the 12th moving to Benedict Field on St Croix and the 35th to Coolidge Field on Antigua. During its remaining time in the Caribbean, the group operated with its squadrons or detachments at various locations in the Antilles. Partly due to the dispersal of its units, the 12th Squadron was under the operational control of the Antilles Air Task Force from November 1942 and the 10th was reassigned to VI Bomber Command in 1943.

In May 1942, the group's designation finally matched its equipment, when it became the 25th Bombardment Group (Medium). That November the group moved to Edinburgh Field, Trinidad. The B-18 was its primary operational aircraft, although in October 1943, the 59th Bombardment Squadron, which had been attached to the group briefly earlier in the year, was assigned to the group. The 59th operated Douglas A-20 Havoc aircraft. Between November 1942 and August 1943, the 26th Antisubmarine Wing deployed squadrons from Jacksonville and Miami Army Air Fields to Edinburgh Field, where they were attached to the 25th group for operations until returning to Florida. After the group moved back to Borinquen in the fall of 1943, it began a training program to convert to the North American B-25 Mitchell.

In April 1944, in light of the decreasing threat in the Caribbean and the transfer of the remaining antisubmarine mission to the United States navy, the group moved to Alamogordo Army Air Field, New Mexico, where it began training with Boeing B-17 Flying Fortresses, but was disbanded in June 1944 and its personnel and equipment transferred to the 231st AAF Base Unit (Combat Crew Training Station, Bombardment, Heavy), which conducted B-17 training at Alamogordo.

==== Reconnaissance in the European Theater of Operations ====
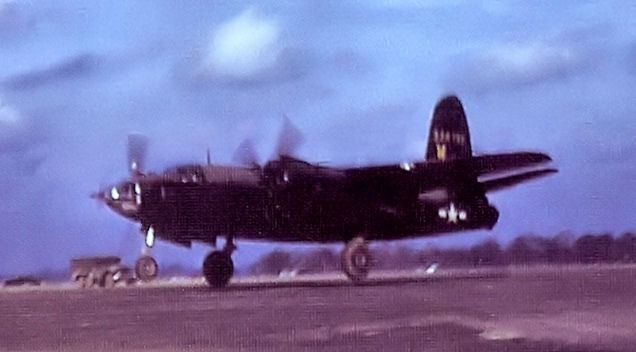
654th Bomb Sq Martin B-26 (Note: Aircraft is Martin B-26G-1-MA Marauder, serial 43-34195 painted black for night reconnaissance missions.)

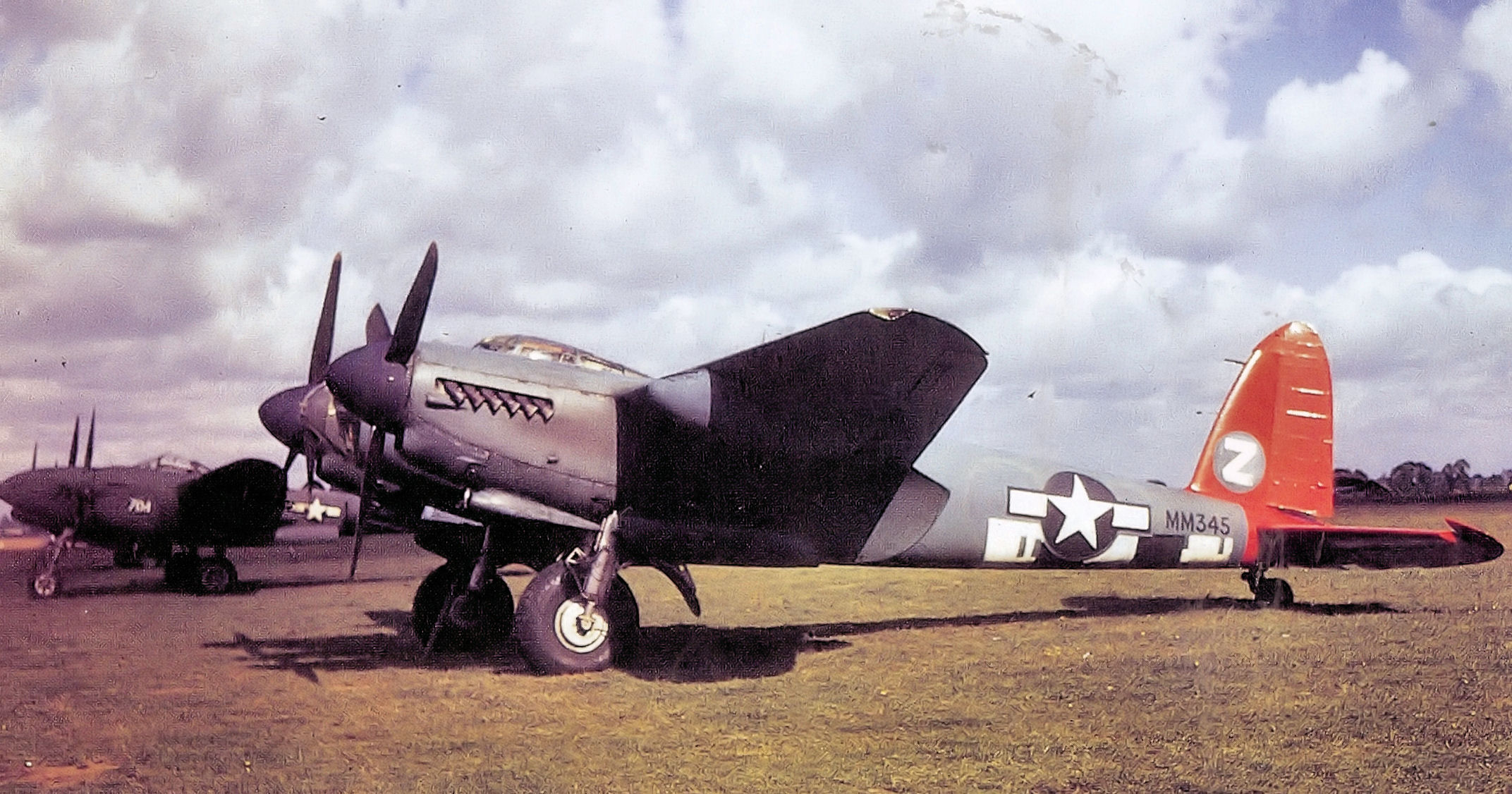
de Havilland Mosquito XVI of the 654th Bomb Sq

Weather reconnaissance for Eighth Air Force was initially performed on an ad hoc basis by heavy bombers detailed to the 18th Weather Squadron for individual missions. In the spring of 1944, Eighth Air Force created provisional reconnaissance units, primarily for weather reconnaissance. On 22 March, it brought these provisional units together, along with a squadron for special reconnaissance, under the 8th Reconnaissance Group (Special) (Provisional) at RAF Cheddington, England. This unit became the 802d Reconnaissance Group (Special) (Provisional) on 30 March 1944, and moved to RAF Watton on 12 April 1944. In July, Eighth received permission to organize these provisional units into a regular organization and on 9 August, it activated the 25th Bombardment Group, Reconnaissance from the resources of the provisional 802d Group and assigned to it the 652d, 653d and 654th Bombardment Squadrons.

The group's weather reconnaissance missions included area reconnaissance over the Atlantic Ocean, ranging as far as the Azores, to obtain information for weather forecasting for Eighth and Ninth Air Forces units operating in the British Isles. These flights were performed by B-17s and Consolidated B-24 Liberators assigned to the 652d Squadron. Squadron bombers on these long range missions, code named Sharon and Allah, took periodic meteorological readings at altitudes varying from 50 to 30,000 feet.

Flights over the Continent of Europe to obtain information for use in operational planning and occasional weather scouting missions over targets to provide current weather information for relay to bombers on their way to attack fell to the de Havilland Mosquitos Mk. XVI of the 653d Squadron. (Note: The pilots for the Mosquitoes of the 653d and 654th Squadrons came from the 50th Fighter Squadron. which provided the personnel for the provisional squadrons, and which was disbanded in August 1944 with its personnel transferring to the new squadrons. Freeman, p. 240.) These missions were code named Bluestocking.

The 25th's 654th Squadron conducted night photographic reconnaissance missions (code named Joker) to detect German operations being conducted under the cover of darkness as well as daytime and mapping missions over Occupied Europe using a variety of aircraft. Some missions were conducted to provide target imagery for H2X radars to be used on later strikes. The group also performed post-strike visual reconnaissance and prestrike electronic warfare, distributing chaff ahead of attacking formations. Experiments had shown that Mosquitoes equipped with an electric dispensing system in their bomb bays provided the optimum coverage of chaff and thirty of the group's aircraft were specially equipped for this mission. The squadron also had three Martin B-26 Marauders for Joker missions and two Douglas A-26 Invaders assigned for special operations with the Office of Strategic Services.

By the end of the war, the group had flown 3501 sorties, each of which (with the exception of chaff missions) was flown by a single aircraft. (Note: It is not clear, but this mission total appears to include those flown by the provisional predecessor of the group between April and August 1944.) Following VE Day in July 1945, the group and the 654th Bombardment Squadron left the European Theater of Operations for the United States. (Note: The other two squadrons remained in England and were reassigned to other headquarters. Maurer, Combat Squadrons, pp. 696–97.) It was inactivated in September 1945 at Drew Field, Florida.

=== Cold War ===
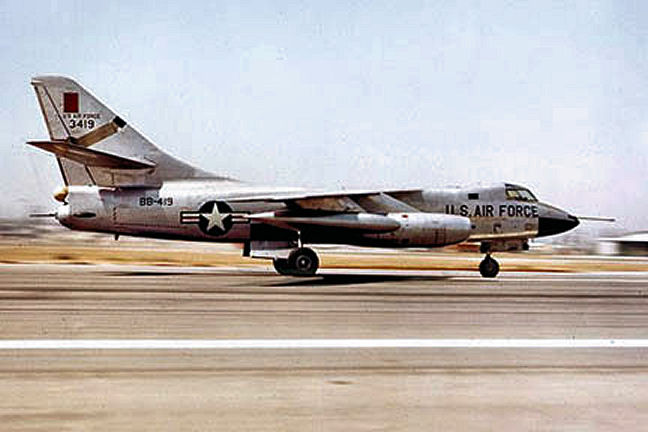
RB-66 Destroyer (Note: Aircraft is Douglas RB-66B-DL Destroyer, serial 54-0419, later converted to EB-66E. Sent to the Military Aircraft Storage and Disposition Center on 27 November 1972 and declared excess on 2 August 1974. Baugher, Joe (24 July 2023). "1954 USAF Serial Numbers". Joe Baugher.) on the runway at Chambley AB

In 1965, United States Air Forces Europe reorganized its reconnaissance units in France, several of which were physically separated from their headquarters, the 10th Tactical Reconnaissance Wing at RAF Alconbury, England. On 1 July 1965, the 42d Tactical Reconnaissance Squadron moved from Toul-Rosières Air Base to Chambley Air Base, France. The two World War II 25th Bombardment Groups consolidated as the 25th Tactical Reconnaissance Group and activated along with support elements at Chambley as the parent for the 42d Squadron. The group absorbed the personnel and equipment of the 7367th Combat Support Group, which was simultaneously discontinued at Chambley. On 1 October, the 19th Tactical Reconnaissance Squadron joined the 42d at Chambley and the 25th Group was inactivated and replaced by the 25th Tactical Reconnaissance Wing.

The 25th flew variants of the Douglas B-66 Destroyer on photographic reconnaissance and electronic warfare missions. Its 42d Squadron flew RB-66Cs with a seven-man crew for electronic reconnaissance, (commonly called Ferret) operations. The squadron's electronic countermeasures operators were known as Ravens. The 19th Squadron flew RB-66Bs with a three-man crew to perform day and night photography missions. (Note: Squadron markings were a red band on the engine nacelle for the 19th and a blue band for the 42d.)

Although the 19th and 42d had been flying the Destroyer before joining the 25th, major construction projects were needed to accommodate their modified bombers, since Chambley had previously hosted fighter units. Larger hangars, maintenance facilities and a more capable electrical system were constructed. The base operations facility was expanded to accommodate the specialized RB-66 aircrew simulator. This simulator could be used to train pilots, navigator/camera operators and gunners, but did not provide for training the 42d Squadron's Ravens. (Note: "Ravens" was a popular name for the electronic reconnaissance equipment operators, or the aircraft they operated from.) Pilot training also posed a problem because there were no dual control B-66s for pilot checkout. Another obstacle to photographic reconnaissance training was a 1965 edict that prohibited aerial photography over France. This forced training missions to be conducted over West Germany and Great Britain. The closing of American bases in Morocco deprived the wing of suitable ranges where flash bombs could be used for night photographic reconnaissance training.

In October 1965 six of the wing's RB-66Cs deployed to Thailand to establish an electronic countermeasures capability in Southeast Asia. These were organized as Detachment 1 of the wing on 10 October. The detachment was awarded an Air Force Outstanding Unit Award for its performance. The movement of B-66s to the combat theater resulted in the inactivation of the 42d Squadron in August 1966 and the transfer of the majority of its aircraft and a large proportion of its aircrews to Takhli Royal Thai Air Force Base, where they were assigned to the 432d Tactical Reconnaissance Wing. (Note: The planes and personnel at Takhli were transferred to the 6460th Tactical Reconnaissance Squadron.) A few of the aircraft were flown to Douglas Aircraft's Tulsa, Oklahoma plant for modifications before going to Southeast Asia.

The impact of the need for reconnaissance assets in Southeast Asia and limitations on training on the wing's continued existence was compounded by French President Charles De Gaulle's March 1966 announcement that France was withdrawing from the NATO Military Command Structure. In connection with France's withdrawal all foreign troops stationed in France were to be withdrawn by 1 April 1967. As a result, the 19th Tactical Reconnaissance Squadron moved to Shaw Air Force Base, South Carolina, and was assigned to the 363d Tactical Reconnaissance Wing on 1 September 1966. The squadron flew its RB-66Bs from Chambley to Shaw with three air-to-air refuelings over the Atlantic following a stop at Moron Air Base, Spain. Although the 19th was based in the United States and was to be available for NATO operations, It primarily trained aircrews for combat operations in Southeast Asia.

Although it was no longer operational, the wing continued to wind down operations at Chambley until 15 October 1966, when it inactivated. Its remaining support personnel were transferred to the 7367th Tactical Group, which managed US Air Force operations at Chambley until they terminated in April 1967.

=== Unmanned aircraft operations ===
In January 1984, the 25th Tactical Reconnaissance Group and 25th Tactical Reconnaissance Wing were consolidated into a single unit. It remained inactive until 2 October 2018, when it was redesignated the 25th Attack Group and activated at Shaw Air Force Base, South Carolina.

In February 2021, the group started flying sorties in Romania with the MQ-9 Reaper.

The group was upgraded to a wing in September 2025. The new wing became responsible for all conventional Air Force MQ-9 Reaper operations, leaving the 432d Wing at Creech Air Force Base, Nevada responsible for special operations-associated MQ-9 flying. It added three maintenance squadrons and two operational squadrons, all located at Creech AFB. The 11th Attack Squadron had been a training unit, conducting all MQ-9 aircrew launch and recovery initial qualifications training and operator upgrade training. With the transfer the 11th became a combat flying squadron. The 42nd Attack Squadron, although nominally active under the 432nd Wing, had not been manned or equipped since 2020, but will now also conduct conventional MQ-9 operations. The 11th was the first Remotely Piloted Aerial System squadron in the Air Force, while the 42nd was the first Air Force unit to operate the MQ-9.

== Lineage ==
25th Bombardment Group (Medium)

- Established as the 25th Bombardment Group (Heavy) on 22 December 1939

Activated 1 February 1940
Redesignated: 25th Bombardment Group (Medium) on 7 May 1942
Disbanded on 20 June 1944
Reconstituted on 19 April 1965 and consolidated with 25th Bombardment Group, Reconnaissance as the 25th Tactical Reconnaissance Group

25th Tactical Reconnaissance Group

- Established as the 25th Bombardment Group, Reconnaissance on 17 July 1944

Activated on 9 August 1944
Inactivated on 8 September 1945
Consolidated with the 25th Bombardment Group (Medium) on 19 April 1965 as the 25th Tactical Reconnaissance Group and activated (not organized)
Organized on 1 July 1965
Discontinued and inactivated on 1 October 1965
Consolidated with the 25th Tactical Reconnaissance Wing as the 25th Tactical Reconnaissance Wing on 31 January 1984

25th Attack Group

- Established as the 25th Tactical Reconnaissance Wing and activated on 24 September 1965 (not organized)

Organized on 1 October 1965
Inactivated on 15 October 1966
Consolidated with the 25th Tactical Reconnaissance Group on 31 January 1984
Redesignated 25th Attack Group on 13 February 2018
Activated on 4 October 2018
Redesignated 25th Attack Wing on 18 September 2025

=== Assignments ===
- General Headquarters Air Force, 1 February – 26 October 1940
- 13th Composite Wing, 1 November 1940
- VI Bomber Command, 25 October 1941
- Second Air Force, c. 6 April – 20 June 1944
- 325th Reconnaissance Wing, 9 August 1944 (Note: "Factsheet 325 Air Division, Reconnaissance". Air Force Historical Research Agency. 5 October 2007. Archived from the original on 30 October 2012. indicates this assignment was from 6 October 1944 to c. 23 July 1945.)
- Third Air Force, c. 6 August – 8 September 1945
- United States Air Forces in Europe, 19 April 1965 (not organized)
- Seventeenth Air Force, 1 July – 1 October 1965 (Note: The 25th Tactical Reconnaissance Wing, not organized, was assigned to United States Air Forces in Europe, 24 September – 1 October 1965. Ravenstein, pp. 46–47.)
- Seventeenth Air Force, 1 October 1965 – 15 October 1966
- 432d Wing, 4 October 2018
- Fifteenth Air Force, 18 September 2025 – present

=== Components ===
==== Group ====
- 25th Combat Support Group, 1 October 1965 – 15 October 1966

==== Squadrons ====
Operational Squadrons

- 7th Antisubmarine Squadron, attached 20 April – 20 July 1943
- 8th Antisubmarine Squadron, attached July–August 1943
- 9th Antisubmarine Squadron, attached November 1942 – March 1943
- 10th Bombardment Squadron, 1 February 1940 – 17 December 1943 (attached to VI Bomber Command after 13 December 1943)
- 10th Tactical Reconnaissance Squadron, 1 October 1965 – 1 September 1966
- 11th Attack Squadron, 18 September 2025 – present
- 12th Bombardment Squadron, 1 February 1940 – 20 June 1944 (under the operational control of the Antilles Air Task Force and VI Fighter Command November 1942 – c. 19 July 1943)
- 19th Tactical Reconnaissance Squadron, 1 October 1965 – 1 September 1966
- 20th Attack Squadron, 4 October 2018 – present
- 27th Reconnaissance Squadron (later 417th Bombardment Squadron): attached 1 November 1940 – 25 February 1944, assigned 25 February – 20 June 1944 (Note: Conway, however, dates the change from attachment to assignment as 3 March 1942 or 3 March 1943. Conway, History 25th Bombardment Group (Medium), Conaway, William Jr. "VI Bomber Command in Defense of the Panama Canal 1941–1945: Unit Histories 417th Bombardment Squadron (Medium)". planesandpilotsofworldwarii. Conway cites an order dated February 1942 as authority for the change, and other reconnaissance squadrons redesignated as bombardment squadrons in the spring of 1942 changed their status simultaneously. See Maurer, Combat Squadrons, entries for the 391st–436th Bombardment Squadrons.)
- 35th Bombardment Squadron, 1 February 1940 – 20 June 1944
- 42d Tactical Reconnaissance Squadron, 1 July–1 October 1965, 1 October 1965 – 22 August 1966
- 42d Attack Squadron, 4 October 2018 – 1 February 2020,
- 50th Attack Squadron, 27 February 2018 – present 18 September 2025 – present
- 54th Reconnaissance Squadron, see 654th Bombardment Squadron
- 59th Bombardment Squadron: attached 26 April–1 August 1943 (under operational control of the Antilles Air Task Force), assigned 11 October 1943 – 20 June 1944
- 89th Attack Squadron, 4 October 2018 – present
- 417th Bombardment Squadron, see 27th Reconnaissance Squadron.
- 482d Attack Squadron, 4 October 2018 – present
- 652d Bombardment Squadron, 9 August 1944 – 13 July 1945
- 653d Bombardment Squadron, 9 August 1944 – 5 September 1945 (attached to 7th Reconnaissance Group after 6 August 1945)
- 654th Bombardment Squadron (later 54th Reconnaissance Squadron), 9 August 1944 – 8 September 1945

Support Squadrons

- 25th Aircraft Maintenance Squadron, 18 September 2025 – present
- 25th Armament and Electronics Maintenance Squadron, 1 October 1965 – 15 October 1966
- 25th Combat Support Squadron, 1 July 1965 – 1 October 1965
- 25th Communications Maintenance Squadron, 18 September 2025 –
- 25th Consolidated Aircraft Maintenance Squadron (later 25th Field Maintenance Squadron), 1 July 1965 – 15 October 1966
- 25th Maintenance Squadron, 18 September 2025 – present
- 25th Operations Support Squadron, 25 November 2018 – present
- 25th Organizational Maintenance Squadron, 1 October 1965 – 15 October 1966

==== Other ====
- 25th Tactical Dispensary, 1 July 1965 – 15 October 1966

=== Stations ===
- Langley Field, Virginia, 1 February–26 October 1940
- Borinquen Field, Puerto Rico, 1 November 1940
- Edinburgh Field, Trinidad, 1 November 1942
- Fort Amsterdam, Curaçao, 1 August 1943
- Borinquen Field, Puerto Rico, 5 October 1943 – 24 March 1944
- Alamogordo Army Air Field, New Mexico, 6 April – 20 June 1944
- RAF Watton (Station 376), England, 9 August 1944 – 23 July 1945
- Drew Field, Florida, August – 8 September 1945
- Chambley Air Base, France 1 July 1965 – 1 October 1965, 1 October 1965 – 15 October 1966
- Shaw Air Force Base, South Carolina, 27 February 2018 – present

=== Aircraft ===
- Northrop A-17 Nomad (1940)
- Douglas B-18 Bolo (1940–1943)
- Boeing B-17 Flying Fortress (1940, 1944, 1944–1945)
- Douglas A-20 Havoc (1942–1943)
- North American B-25 Mitchell (1943–1944, 1944–1945)
- Consolidated B-24 Liberator (1944–1945)
- Martin B-26 Marauder (1944–1945)
- de Havilland Mosquito (1944–1945)
- Lockheed P-38 Lightning (1944–1945)
- Stinson L-5 Sentinel
- Douglas RB-66B/EB-66E Destroyer (1965–1966)
- General Atomics RQ-9 Predator

=== Awards and campaigns ===
Award streamer	Award	Dates	Notes
	Air Force Meritorious Unit Award	1 June 2018–31 May 2020	25th Attack Group
	Air Force Outstanding Unit Award	1 June 2019–31 May 2021	25th Attack Group
	Air Force Outstanding Unit Award	13 October 1965–8 June 1966	Detachment 1, 25th Tactical Reconnaissance Wing (Note: Award made to the detachment only.)

Campaign Streamer	Campaign	Dates	Notes
	Antisubmarine	7 December 1941 – 1 August 1943	25th Bombardment Group (Medium) (Note: Credit for American Theater service continued until 20 June 1944, but the Navy took over Army Air Forces antisubmarine warfare responsibilities on 1 August 1943. Maurer, Combat Units, p. 480.)
	Northern France	9 August 1944 – 14 September 1944	25th Bombardment Group, Reconnaissance
	Rhineland	15 September 1944 – 21 March 1945	25th Bombardment Group, Reconnaissance
	Ardennes-Alsace	16 December 1944 – 25 January 1945	25th Bombardment Group, Reconnaissance
	Central Europe	22 March 1944 – 21 May 1945	25th Bombardment Group, Reconnaissance

== See also ==
- List of inactive AFCON wings of the United States Air Force
- List of Douglas A-20 Havoc operators
- B-17 Flying Fortress units of the United States Army Air Forces
- B-24 Liberator units of the United States Army Air Forces
- List of Martin B-26 Marauder operators
