= VIII Fighter Command =

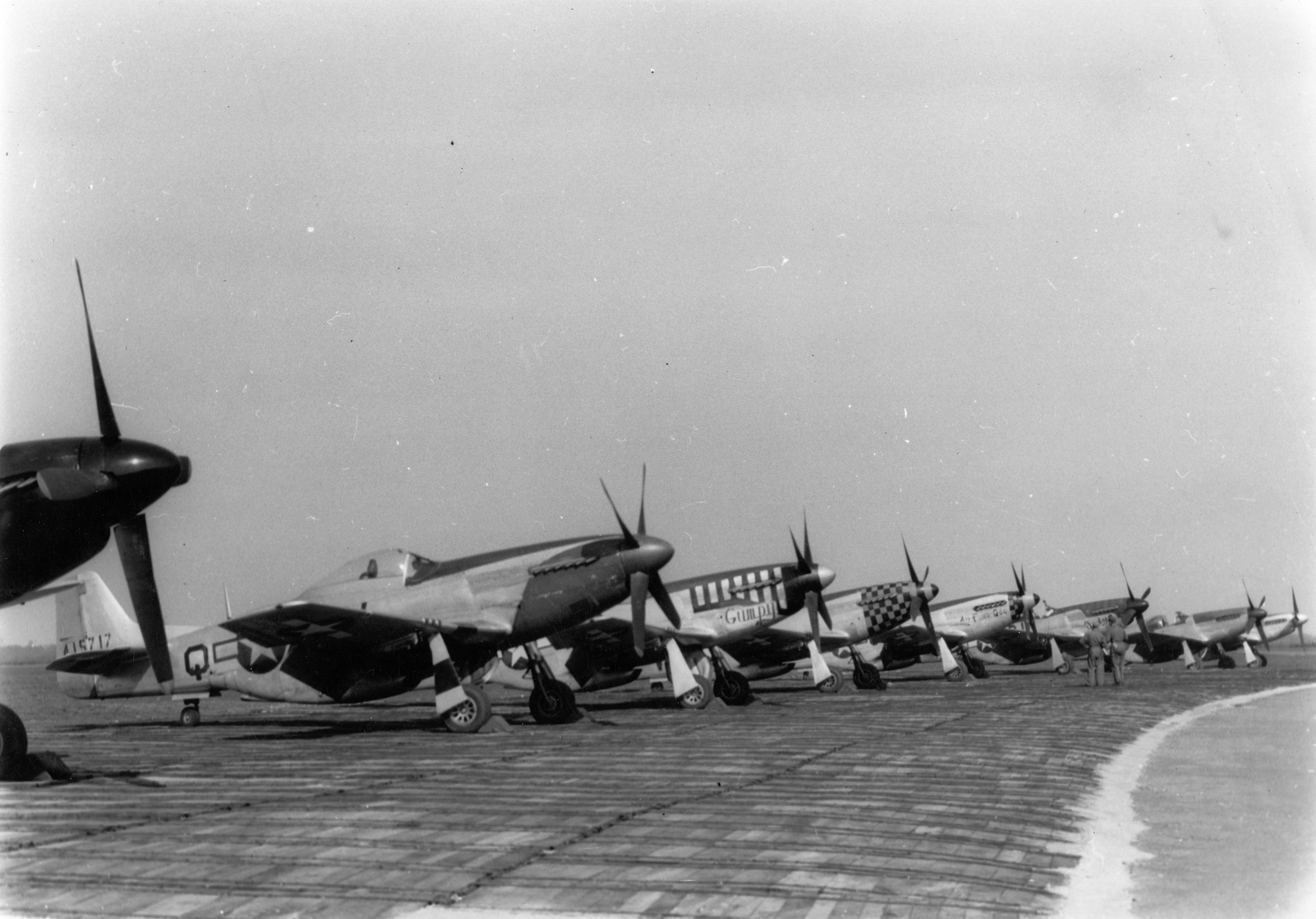
- P-51D Mustangs of the command's groups (Note: P-51s are CV-Q of the 359th Fighter Group, LC-D of the 20th Fighter Group, LH-V of the 353rd Fighter Group and C5-Q of the 357th Fighter Group, at RAF Debden, home of the 4th Fighter Group in 1945.)
- Active: 1942–1946
- Country: United States
- Branch: United States Air Force
- Role: Fighter escort
- Engagements: European Theater of Operations

Commanders
- Notable commanders: Brigadier General Frank O'Driscoll Hunter; Major General William Ellsworth Kepner

Insignia
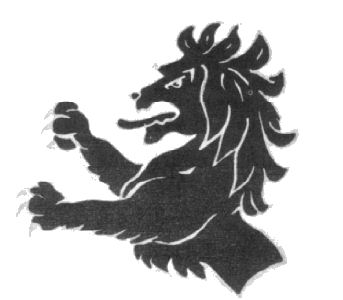
- VIII Fighter Command emblem (Note: Approved 23 May 1942.)

The VIII Fighter Command was a United States Army Air Forces unit of command above the wings and below the numbered air force. Its primary mission was command of fighter operations within the Eighth Air Force. In the World War II European Theater, its primary mission was air superiority. Its last assignment was with the United States Air Forces in Europe at RAF Honington,

It was formed at Selfridge Field, Michigan in February 1942. In May, the headquarters moved to England to conduct combat operations over Occupied Europe. After the end of the European War in May 1945, VIII Fighter Command took part in the occupation of Germany until May 1946 while simultaneously coordinating its own demobilization. It inactivated in March 1946 at RAF Honington, the last Royal Air Force station used by the USAAF to be returned to the British Air Ministry.

== History ==
The VIII Fighter Command was constituted initially as 8th Interceptor Command at Selfridge Field, Michigan on 19 January 1942. Assigned the 4th and 5th Air Defense Wings, the command's mission was air defense over the north central United States. The command's mission was changed as it was ordered to deploy to Britain in February 1942 as first it moved to Charleston Army Air Field on 13 February, then shipped overseas to England where on 12 May it set up headquarters at RAF Bushey Hall, near Watford, Hertfordshire.

During much of 1943, bomber escort for VIII Bomber Command was the primary mission for VIII Fighter Command. Fighter groups had a mix of aircraft models of the fighter type plus some administrative utility and liaison types. During 1942–1943, the assigned fighter groups flew three types of aircraft during 1942–43: the Supermarine Spitfire, the Republic P-47 Thunderbolt and the Lockheed P-38 Lightning. The command itself was engaged in command and control, without a complement of aircraft for combat.

Eventually the fighter groups were organized into three fighter wings. These were the 65th, 66th and 67th Fighter Wings. When the Eighth Air Force converted from bombardment divisions to air divisions, the fighter wings came under operational control of the three air divisions.

=== Combat operations ===
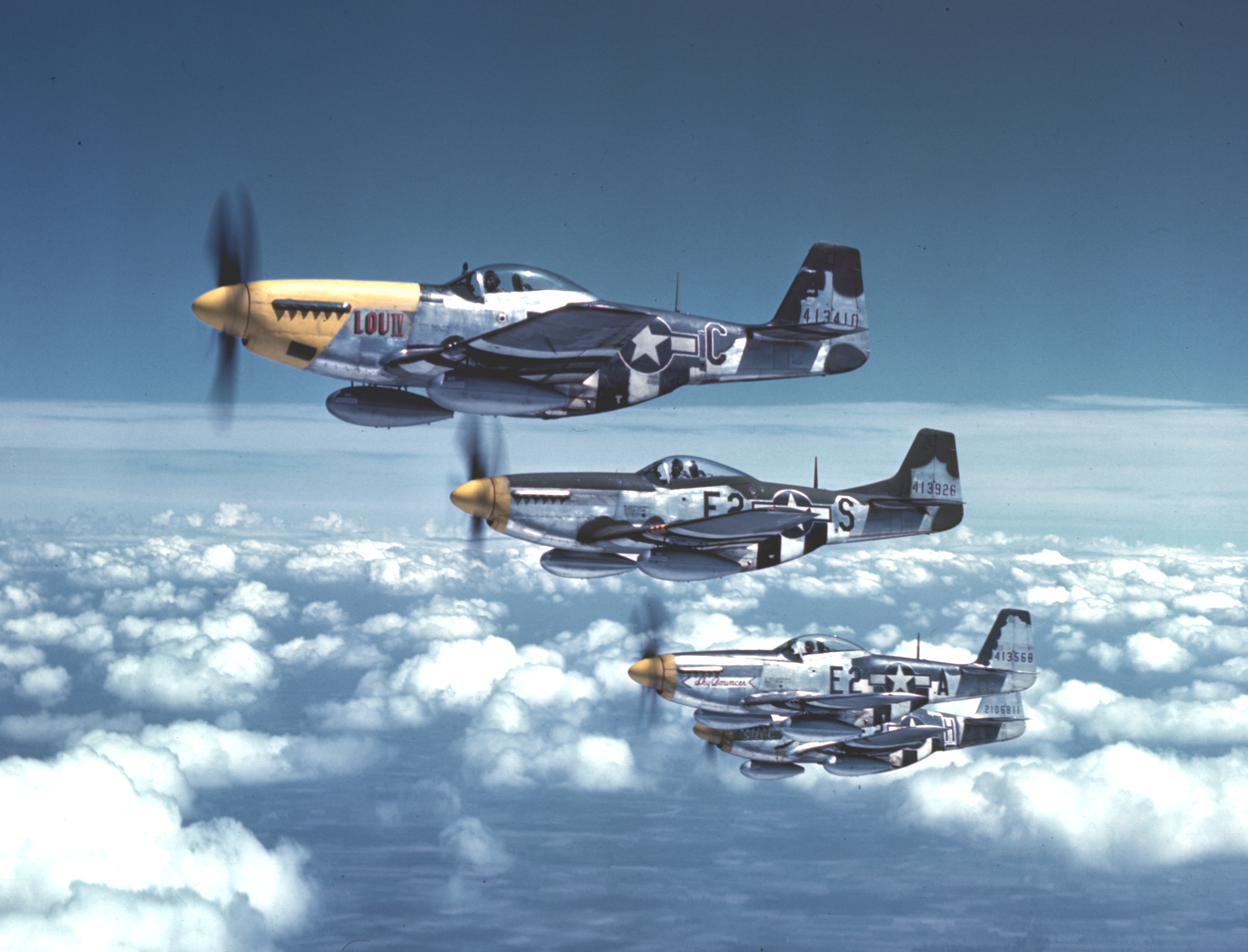
North American P-51 Mustangs of the 375th Fighter Squadron, summer 1944

The effect of the North American P-51 Mustang on the Luftwaffe was swift and decisive. The result was that the Luftwaffe was notable by its absence over the skies of Europe after D-Day, and the Allies were starting to achieve air superiority over the continent. Although the Luftwaffe could (and did) mount effective attacks on the ever-increasing number of Allied heavy bomber formations, the sheer numbers of Allied bombers attacking targets throughout occupied Europe overwhelmed the German fighter force, which simply could not sustain the losses the Eighth Air Force bombers and fighters were inflicting on it.

When Lt. Gen. Jimmy Doolittle took command of the Eighth Air Force in January 1944, he initiated a policy change. Previously, fighters were largely tied to the bombers, but Doolittle and Maj Gen William Ellsworth Kepner freed many fighters to go "down on the deck" and allowed them to become far more aggressive. The fighters were now able to seek out the Luftwaffe and actively attack their airfields. This caused Luftwaffe losses to rise to unsustainable levels, increasing pressure on the German fighter arm, with an attendant reduction in USAAF bomber losses, while fighter losses inevitably rose.

By mid-1944, Eighth Air Force had reached a total strength of more than 200,000 personnel (it is estimated that more than 350,000 Americans served in Eighth Air Force during the war in Europe.) At peak strength, Eighth Air Force had forty heavy bomber groups, fifteen fighter groups, and four specialized support groups.

In September 1944, VIII Fighter Command attached its fighter wings to Eighth Air Force's bombardment divisions. This administrative move allowed each division operational control of several fighter groups to fly escort to their heavy bomber wings. The 65th Fighter Wing was attached to the 2nd Bombardment Division, the 66th Fighter Wing to the 3d Bombardment Division, and 67th Fighter Wing to the 1st Bombardment Division. This reassignment of the three fighter wings created the air divisions within the Eighth Air Force, replacing the bombardment divisions.

VIII Fighter Command also attacked German transport, logistics centers, and troops during the Normandy campaign, though tactical operations in the European Theater largely were the realm of the Ninth Air Force. During the Battle of the Bulge in late December 1944, several VIII Fighter Command groups were attached to Ninth Air Force to relieve the Army's ground forces with close air support. After the initial German attack was blunted by early January, the units remained attached until February 1945, assisting the counterattack by Allied forces.

First seen by Allied airmen during the late summer of 1944, it wasn't until March 1945 that German jet aircraft started to attack Allied bomber formations in earnest. On 2 March, when Eighth Air Force bombers were dispatched to attack the synthetic oil refineries at Leipzig, Messerschmitt Me 262s attacked the formation near Dresden. The next day, the largest formation of German jets ever seen, most likely from the Luftwaffe's specialist Jagdgeschwader 7 "Nowotny", made attacks on Eighth Air Force bomber formations over Dresden and the oil targets at Essen, shooting down a total of three bombers.

However, the Luftwaffe jets were simply too few and too late to have any serious effect on the Allied air armadas, now sweeping over the Reich with near impunity. V-1 flying bomb and V-2 rocket sites were gradually overrun and the lack of fuel and available pilots for the new jets had virtually driven the Luftwaffe from the skies. The Me-262 was an elusive foe in the skies for the P-47s and P-51s, outclassing the American fighters. Despite its great speed advantage. Allied bomber escort fighters would fly high above the bombers – diving from this height gave them extra speed, thus reducing the speed difference. The Me 262 was less maneuverable than the P-51 and trained Allied pilots could catch up to a turning Me 262. However, the only reliable way of dealing with the jets, as with the even faster Me 163 Komet rocket fighters, was to attack them on the ground and during takeoff and landing. Luftwaffe airfields that were identified as jet bases were frequently bombed by medium bombers, and Allied fighters patrolled over the fields to attack jets trying to land. The Luftwaffe countered by installing flak alleys along the approach lines in order to protect the Me 262s from the ground and providing top cover with conventional fighters during takeoff and landing. Nevertheless, in March and April 1945, Allied fighter patrol patterns over Me 262 airfields resulted in numerous losses of jets and serious attrition of the force.

On 7 April, the Eighth Air Force dispatched thirty-two B-17 and B-24 groups and fourteen Mustang groups (the sheer numbers of attacking Allied aircraft were so large in 1945 that they were now counted by the group) to targets in the small area of Germany still controlled by the Nazis, hitting the remaining airfields where the Luftwaffe jets were stationed. In addition, almost 300 German aircraft of all types were destroyed in strafing attacks. On 16 April, this record was broken when over 700 German aircraft were destroyed on the ground. The Luftwaffe was, simply, finished.

At war's end the 8th's fighters had claimed 5,280 enemy aircraft shot down and 4,100 more claimed destroyed on the ground. Losses were 2,113 in total. Some 260 VIII Fighter Command pilots became aces, with five or more aerial victories, though the command also recognized planes destroyed on the ground. The top aces were Lt. Col. Francis S. Gabreski (28) and Capt. Robert S. Johnson (27) of the 56th Fighter Group plus Maj. George E. Preddy (26.83) and Lt. Col. John C. Meyer (24) of the 352nd. Gabreski was shot down and captured in July 1944, and Preddy was killed in December. Some 5,000 pilots served with the command of which 2,156 made at least one part share claim for a kill. Just 57 pilots made claims into double figures.

== Lineage ==
- Constituted as the 8th Interceptor Command on 19 January 1942 (Note: Maurer indicates that the unit was constituted as the "VIII" Fighter Command. However, the unit was constituted and activated with an arabic number in its name. The use of roman numerals to designate Army Air Forces combat commands did not begin until September 1942. "Air Force Historical Research Agency Organizational Reconds: Types of USAF Organizations". Air Force History Index. 9 January 2008.)

Activated on 1 February 1942
Redesignated 8th Fighter Command on 15 May 1942
Redesignated VIII Fighter Command c.18 September 1942
Inactivated on 20 March 1946
Disbanded on 8 October 1948

=== Assignments ===
- 8th Air Force (later Eighth Air Force): 1 February 1942 (Note: Eighth Air Force was redesignated United States Strategic Air Forces in February 1944.)
- Eighth Air Force, 22 February 1944 (Note: VIII Bomber Command was redesignated Eighth Air Force in February 1944.)
- United States Strategic Air Forces in Europe (later United States Air Forces in Europe), 16 July 1945 – 20 March 1946

=== Components ===
Wings

- 4th Air Defense Wing (later 65th Fighter Wing), 4 June 1943 – 15 September 1944
- 5th Air Defense Wing (later 66th Fighter Wing), 3 July 1943 – 15 September 1944
- 6th Fighter Wing, 7 June 1942 – 14 September 1942
- 67th Fighter Wing, 26 August 1943 – 15 September 1944
- 96th Bombardment Wing, 16 July – 6 August 1945
- 325th Reconnaissance Wing, 16 July – 20 October 1945

Groups

- 1st Fighter Group, (P-38): 10 June – 16 August 1942
- 4th Fighter Group, (Spitfire): 12 September 1942 – c. 1 July 1943
- 7th Reconnaissance Group: c. 18 October – 21 November 1945
- 20th Fighter Group, (P-38): 25 August 1943 – 6 October 1943
- 31st Fighter Group (P-38): 9 June – 14 September 1942
- 55th Fighter Group (P-38): 15 September 1943 – 5 October 1943
- 56th Fighter Group (P-47): c. 12 January – 4 July 1943
- 67th Observation Group (later 67th Reconnaissance Group, 67th Tactical Reconnaissance Group): 5 September 1942 – November 1943
- 78th Fighter Group, (P-38) 29 November 1942 – 30 June 1943
- 94th Bombardment Group: 1 November – c. 21 December 1945
- 100th Bombardment Group: 1 November – c. 21 December 1945
- 350th Fighter Group: 2 October 1942 – 6 January 1943
- 352d Fighter Group, (P-47) 8 July-6 October 1943
- 353d Fighter Group, (P-47) 7 June 1943 – 18 August 1943
- 355th Fighter Group: c. 6 July – 9 September 1943
- 361st Fighter Group, (P-47; P-51) 30 November 1943 – 12 December 1943; 1 February 1945 – 10 April 1945
- 479th Fighter Group, 16 May − 15 September 1944
- 482d Bombardment Group, 1 October 1944 – 1 January 1945
- 492nd Bombardment Group: 1–c. 22 October 1944

Squadrons

- 27th Photographic Reconnaissance Squadron: attached 26 January – 22 April 1945
- 36th Bombardment Squadron: 1 October 1944 – 1 January 1945
- 406th Bombardment Squadron: 1 October – 30 December 1944
- 414th Night Fighter Squadron: air echelon attached 31 March – 2 July 1943
- 415th Night Fighter Squadron: air echelon attached 31 March – 2 July 1943
- 416th Night Fighter Squadron: 11 May – 8 August 1943 (attached to Royal Air Force)
- 417th Night Fighter Squadron: 11 May – 8 August 1943 (attached to Royal Air Force)
- 435th Fighter Squadron: 1–15 December 1945
- 436th Fighter Squadron: 1–21 December 1945
- 652d Bombardment Squadron: 1 November – 19 December 1945
- 653d Bombardment Squadron: 1 November – 19 December 1945

=== Stations ===
- Selfridge Field, Michigan, 1 February 1942
- Charleston Army Air Field, South Carolina, c. 13 February-c. 1 May 1942
- RAF High Wycombe (AAF-101), England, c. 12 May 1942
- RAF Bushey Hall (AAF-341), England, c. 27 July 1942
- Charleroi Airfield (A-87), Belgium, c. 15 January 1945
- RAF High Wycombe (AAF-101), England, 17 July 1945
- RAF Honington (AAF-375), England, 26 October 1945 – c. 20 March 1946
