= 325th Air Division =

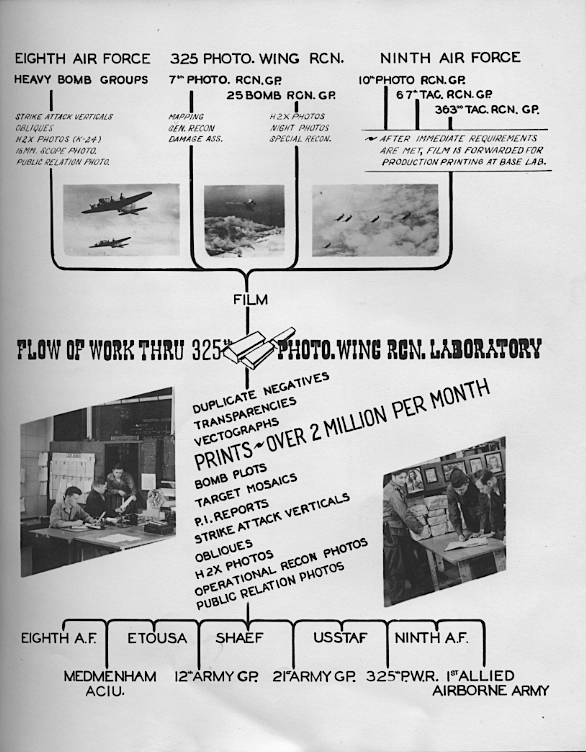
- The 325th printed over two million photos a month
- Active: 1944–1945; 1947–1949
- Country: United States
- Branch: United States Air Force
- Role: Command of reconnaissance units
- Engagements: World War II

Commanders
- Notable commanders: Brigadier General Elliott Roosevelt, 1944, 1945

The 325th Air Division is an inactive United States Air Force unit. Its last assignment was with Fourth Air Force at Hamilton Air Force Base, California, where it was inactivated on 27 June 1949.

The unit was first organized as the 325th Photographic Wing during World War II in England, where it took over the assets of a provisional wing that had been organized earlier in the year. The wing managed the photographic reconnaissance units of Eighth Air Force until the end of the war.

It was reactivated as the 325th Reconnaissance Wing in 1947 and was assigned three subordinate groups in the western United States. It became the 325th Air Division in 1948, but was inactivated in a general reorganization of reserve units in 1949.

== History ==
=== World War II ===
The origins of the 325th Photographic Wing can be traced to early 1944 when Colonel Elliott Roosevelt arrived in the United Kingdom to study and report on weather reconnaissance and photographic reconnaissance there. On the basis of his report, Eighth Air Force formed a provisional unit, the 8th Reconnaissance Wing (Provisional) at RAF Cheddington on 18 February 1944 with Col. Roosevelt as its commander. The wing moved to RAF High Wycombe a few months later. During the preparation for Operation Overlord, the Normandy invasion, the wing flew the first advanced aerial weather scouting missions for strategic bombardment missions. The wing also flew Eighth Air Force's first night photographic missions and flew shuttle reconnaissance missions to both the Mediterranean Theater and to the Soviet Union.

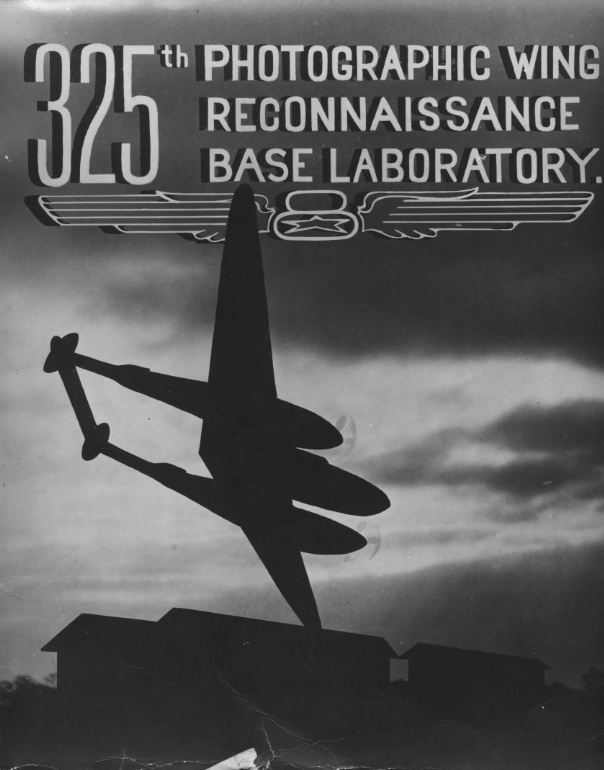
Unit yearbook cover, published in 1945

On 8 August 1944 the organization was made permanent and the 325th replaced the 8th as the headquarters for Eighth Air Force's photographic and weather reconnaissance units.

From August 1944 until October 1945 subordinate units of the 325th, using various aircraft, flew reconnaissance over the waters adjacent to the British Islands and the European continent to obtain photographic and meteorological data for use in the air offensive against Europe and the Allied invasion of the continent. Its aircraft also provided electronic countermeasures support to confuse enemy air defenses during Allied attacks. To ensure the success of an operation as large as the invasion, Allied forces required millions of aerial photographs. The 325th wing base laboratory provided photographs of enemy fortifications and troop dispositions vital to employment of ground forces, while Eighth Air Force daylight precision bombing of industrial and military targets required vast quantities of aerial photographs for target material.

Wing aircraft collected weather information needed in planning operations, flew night photographic missions to detect enemy activity and operated daylight photographic and mapping missions. The wing also flew photographic missions in support of Operation Market Garden, the airborne attacks in the Netherlands, in September 1944. It also operated closely with tactical units in the Battle of the Bulge from December 1944 to February 1945.

To fill demands for photographic reproduction, the best available equipment (American and British) was obtained and supply requirements and channels were established. Personnel were furnished from the 1st (later replaced by the 8th) and 2nd Photographic Technical Squadrons. The unified effort by personnel of both squadrons enabled the laboratory to produce two million prints in a single month.

The wing participated in Project Dick Tracy, a survey of captured German photographic intelligence material. The purpose of Dick Tracy was to make German intelligence materials readily available to British and American headquarters. Following the surrender of Germany, its units participated in the final bomb damage assessment of European targets.

=== Post-war reserves ===
The wing was reactivated as a reserve unit under Air Defense Command (ADC) on 9 April 1947 at Hamilton Field. It was assigned reserve reconnaissance units stationed at Hamilton and at Hill Air Force Base, Utah. In 1948, when the regular Air Force implemented the wing base organization system, the wing, along with other multi-base reserve wings was redesignated as an air division. (Note: In the case of the 325th, this also prevented confusion with the regular 325th Fighter Wing, which was organized at Hamilton in June 1948. Ravenstein, p. 176.) The same year Continental Air Command assumed responsibility for managing reserve and Air National Guard units from ADC.

The 325th participated in routine reserve training with its assigned trainer aircraft and supervised the training of its three assigned groups until it was inactivated in June 1949 when the reserves adopted the wing base organization system. Most of its equipment and personnel were used to form the 349th Troop Carrier Wing, which was simultaneously activated at Hamilton.

== Lineage ==
- Constituted as the 325th Photographic Wing, Reconnaissance on 17 July 1944

Activated on 9 August 1944
Redesignated 325th Reconnaissance Wing on 26 June 1945
Inactivated on 20 October 1945

- Activated in the reserve on 9 April 1947

Redesignated 325th Air Division, Reconnaissance on 16 April 1948
Inactivated on 27 June 1949

=== Assignments ===
- Eighth Air Force, 9 August 1944
- VIII Fighter Command, 16 July 1945 – 20 October 1945
- Fourth Air Force, 9 April 1947 – 27 June 1949

=== Components ===
Groups

- 7th Reconnaissance Group: 9 August 1944 – 18 October 1945
- 25th Bombardment Group: 6 October 1944 – c. 23 July 1945
- 68th Reconnaissance Group: 9 April 1947 – 27 June 1949
- 70th Reconnaissance Group: 26 April 1947 – 27 June 1949
- 72nd Reconnaissance Group: 12 July 1947 – 27 June 1949

Squadrons

- 1st Photographic Technical Squadron: 8 August 1944 – c. 5 November 1944
- 2d Photographic Technical Squadron: 8 August 1944 – c. 17 August 1945
- 8th Photographic Technical Squadron: c. 5 November 1944 – c. 8 October 1945
- 26th Station Complement Squadron: 1944 – 1945
- 652d Bombardment Squadron (Heavy, Weather Reconnaissance): 6 January 1945 – 12 October 1945
- 653d Bombardment Squadron (Light, Weather Reconnaissance): 5 September 1945 – 11 October 1945

Units

- 3d AAF Combat Camera Unit, 8 August 1944 – 6 February 1945
- 8th AAF Combat Camera Unit, 8 August 1944 – c. 20 October 1945

Arms and Services with the Army Air Forces

- Company B, 942d Engineer Aviation Topographic Battalion: 1945

=== Stations ===
- RAF High Wycombe (Station 101), England, 9 August 1944 – 20 October 1945
- Hamilton Field (later Hamilton Air Force Base), California, 9 April 1947 – 27 June 1949

=== Aircraft ===
- Boeing B-17 Flying Fortress, 1944–1945
- Consolidated B-24 Liberator, 1944–1945
- North American B-25 Mitchell, 1944–1945
- Martin B-26 Marauder, 1944–1945
- Lockheed F-5 Lighting, 1944–1945
- Stinson L-5, 1944–1945
- Lockheed P-38 Lightning, 1944–1945
- North American P-51 Mustang, 1944–1945
- Supermarine Spitfire, 1944–1945
- de Havilland Mosquito PR Mk. XVI, 1945
- North American AT-6 Texan, 1947–1949
- Beechcraft AT-7 Navigator, 1947–1949
- Beechcraft AT-11 Kansan, 1947–1949

=== Campaigns ===
Campaign Streamer	Campaign	Dates	Notes
	Northern France	8 August 1944 – 14 September 1944	325th Photographic Wing
	Rhineland	15 September 1944 – 21 March 1945	325th Photographic Wing
	Ardennes-Alsace	16 December 1944 – 25 January 1945	325th Photographic Wing
	Central Europe	22 March 1944 – 21 May 1945	325th Photographic Wing

== See also ==
- B-17 Flying Fortress units of the United States Army Air Forces
- B-24 Liberator units of the United States Army Air Forces
- List of Lockheed P-38 Lightning operators
- List of Martin B-26 Marauder operators
- List of United States Air Force air divisions
