= Germay =

- Commune
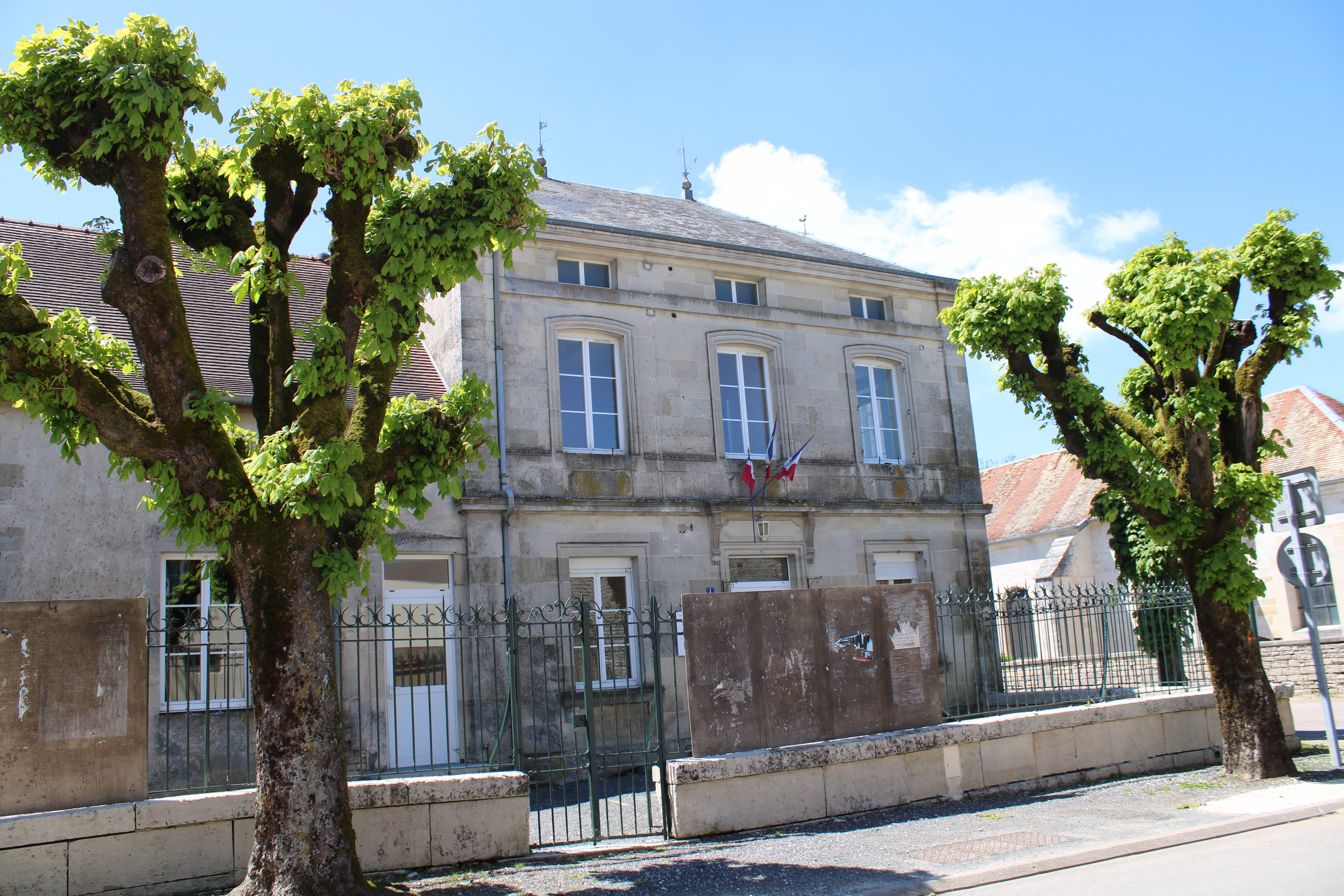
- The town hall in Germay
- Location of Germay
- Location within France Location within Grand Est
- Coordinates: 48°24′38″N 5°21′27″E
- Country: France
- Region: Grand Est
- Department: Haute-Marne
- Arrondissement: Saint-Dizier
- Canton: Poissons

Government
  - Mayor (2020–2026): Philippe Dumay
- Area^{1}: 11.96 km^{2} (4.62 sq mi)
- Elevation: 386 m (1,266 ft)
- Highest elevation: 427 m (1,401 ft)
- Lowest elevation: 319 m (1,047 ft)
- Population (2023): 49
  - Density: 4.1/km^{2} (11/sq mi)
- Time zone: UTC+01:00 (CET)
  - Summer (DST): UTC+02:00 (CEST)
- INSEE/Postal code: 52218 /52230
- ^{1} French Land Register data, which excludes lakes, ponds, glaciers > 1 km^{2} (0.386 sq mi or 247 acres) and river estuaries.

Germay (French pronunciation: [ʒɛʁmɛ]) is a commune in the Haute-Marne department in north-eastern France.

== See also ==
- Communes of the Haute-Marne department
