= 653d Bombardment Squadron =

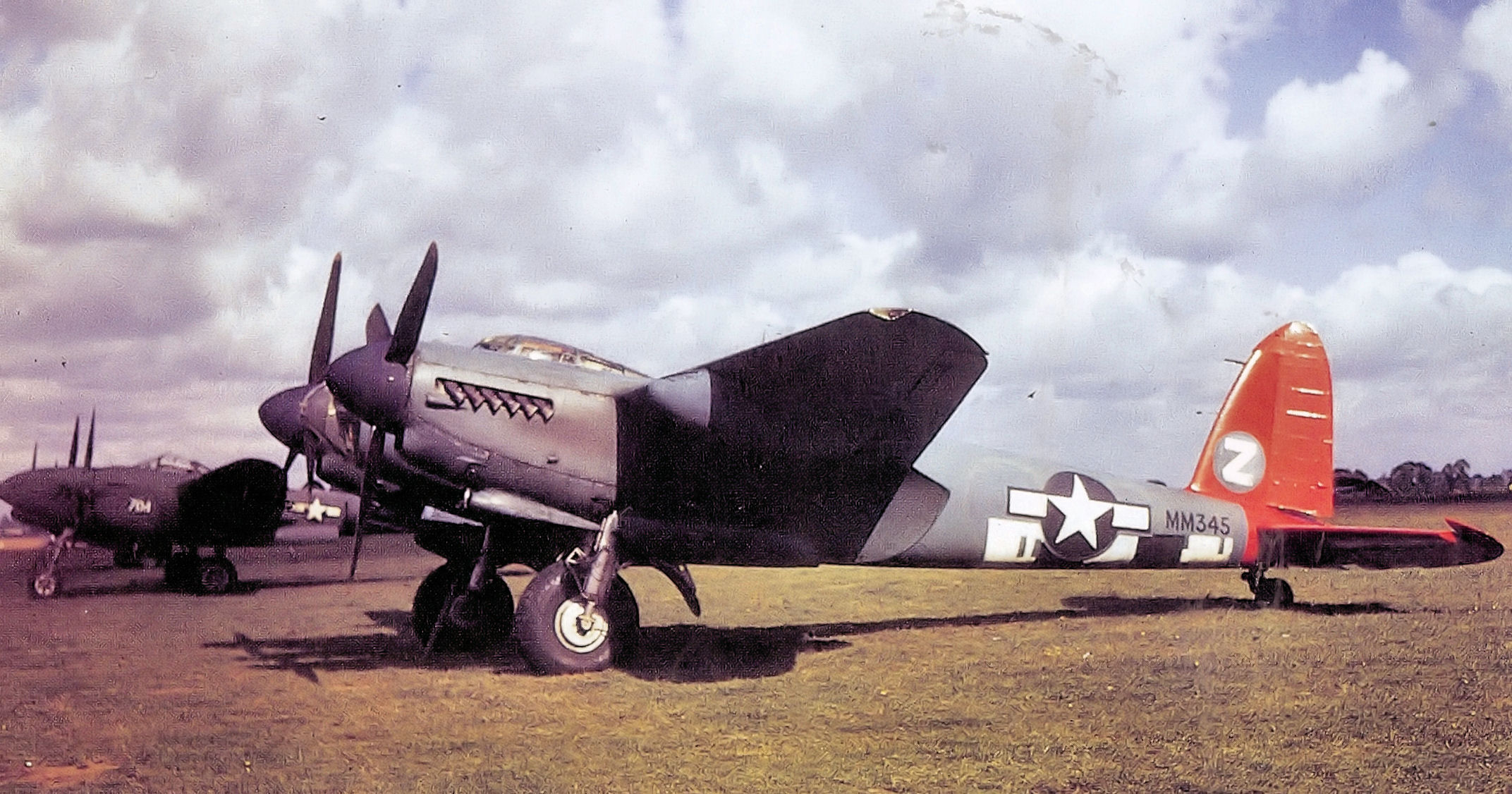
- de Havilland Mosquito of the 25th Bombardment Group
- Active: 1944–1945
- Country: United States
- Branch: United States Air Force
- Role: Weather Reconnaissance
- Engagements: European Theater of Operations

Insignia
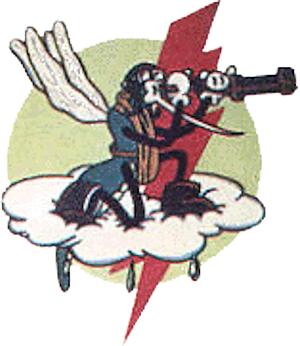
- 653d Bombardment Squadron emblem (Note: Approved 21 February 1945. Description: Over and through a light yellow green disc, a caricatured, gray mosquito wearing brown aviator's helmet and flight boots, tan flak vest, and white goggles and gloves, kneeling on small, white cloud formation, edged black, shadowed gray, and peering toward sinister through crooked, brown telescope held to right eye, all in front of a large, jagged, grayed light red lightning bolt piercing the cloud.)
- Fuselage Code: WX

The 653d Bombardment Squadron is a former United States Army Air Forces unit. The squadron assumed the personnel and equipment of a provisional unit in the summer of 1944. It carried out weather reconnaissance missions from England for the remainder of World War II. Following V-E Day, the squadron returned to the port of embarkation at Camp Kilmer, New Jersey, where it was inactivated on 19 December 1945.

== History ==
=== Background ===
Weather reconnaissance for VIII Bomber Command prior to March 1944 was provided on an ad hoc basis. The 18th Weather Squadron, which provided the command with weather observation and forecasting services through detachments located on each of the command's bases, detailed observers who flew on aircraft of various heavy bomber groups of the command. Rather than continuing to rely on individual bombardment units to perform this mission, on 22 March 1944, Eighth Air Force formed the 8th Reconnaissance Group (Provisional) at RAF Cheddington. On 30 March, the unit was redesignated the 802d Reconnaissance Group, Special (Provisional) and in April, the group moved to RAF Watton. The group's operational element was the 8th Reconnaissance Squadron (Provisional), which had been organized on 23 March 1944.

=== Operations ===
On 9 August 1944, the 802d Group was discontinued and its mission was transferred to the regular 25th Bombardment Group with three operational squadrons. The 653d was equipped with de Havilland Mosquitos. The 653d mission focused on flights over the continent of Europe to observe weather conditions over target areas in advance of attacking bomber forces. This occasionally included last minute "scout" flights to determine whether targets were open to visual attack. The speed of the Mosquito provided it a certain amount of protection from enemy fighters, but shortly after the squadron was activated, it began to receive opposition from Messerschmitt Me 262 Schwalbe jet fighters and its reconnaissance missions began to operate with friendly fighter cover.

Following V-E Day, the 25th Group returned to the United States for inactivation. However, the squadron remained in Europe and continued to fly weather missions through September 1945. The squadron returned to the United States in December and was inactivated at the port of embarkation.

== Lineage ==
- Constituted as the 653d Bombardment Squadron, Heavy, Weather Reconnaissance on 17 July 1944

Activated on 9 August 1944
Inactivated on 19 December 1945

=== Assignments ===
- 25th Bombardment Group, 9 August 1944
- 1st Air Division, 13 July 1945
- 3d Air Division, 25 August 1945
- 1st Air Division, 1 September 1945 (attached to 325th Reconnaissance Wing after 4 September 1945)
- 3d Air Division, 12 October 1945
- VIII Fighter Command, 1 November–19 December 1945

=== Stations ===
- RAF Watton, England (Station 376), 9 August 1944
- RAF Chalgrove (Station 465), England, 5 August 1945
- Hitcham Air Depot (Station 470), England, 15 October–December 1945
- Camp Kilmer, New Jersey, 17–19 December 1945

=== Aircraft ===
- Consolidated B-24 Liberator, 1944
- Boeing B-17 Flying Fortress, 1944
- de Havilland Mosquito PR Mk. XVI, 1944–1945 (Note: Freeman indicates the squadron only operated Mosquitos. Freeman, p. 240.)

=== Campaigns ===
Campaign Streamer	Campaign	Dates	Notes
	Air Combat, EAME Theater	9 August 1944 – 11 May 1945	
	Northern France	9 August 1944 – 14 September 1944	
	Rhineland	15 September 1944 – 21 March 1945	
	Ardennes-Alsace	16 December 1944 – 25 January 1945	
	Central Europe	9 August 1944 – 21 May 1945	
