= 652d Bombardment Squadron =

- Emblem of the 652d Bombardment Squadron
- Active: 1944–1945
- Country: United States
- Branch: United States Army Air Force
- Type: Weather Reconnaissance
- Engagements: World War II

The 652d Bombardment Squadron is an inactive United States Air Force unit. Its last assignment was with VIII Fighter Command, based at Camp Kilmer, New Jersey. It was inactivated on 19 December 1945.

== History ==
=== Lineage ===
- Constituted 652d Bombardment Squadron (Heavy, Weather Reconnaissance) on 17 July 1944

Activated on 9 August 1944.
Inactivated on 19 December 1945.

See 352d Tactical Fighter Squadron for post World War II lineage.

=== Assignments ===
- 25th Bombardment Group (Reconnaissance), 9 August 1944
- 1st Air Division, 13 July 1945
- 3d Air Division, 25 August 1945
- 1st Air Division, 1 September 1945
- 3d Air Division, 12 October 1945
- VIII Fighter Command, 1 November – 19 December 1945

Attached to: 325th Reconnaissance Wing, 6 January – 12 October 1945

=== Stations ===
- RAF Watton, England, 9 August 1944
- RAF Alconbury, England, 13 July 1945
- RAF Raydon, England, 25 October – December 1945
- Camp Kilmer, New Jersey, C. 17–19 December 1945.

=== Aircraft ===
- B-24 Liberator, 1944
- B-17 Flying Fortress, 1944¬1945.

=== Operations ===
Weather reconnaissance in ETO, 10 August 1944 – 26 September 1945.
