= Liffol-le-Grand =

- Commune
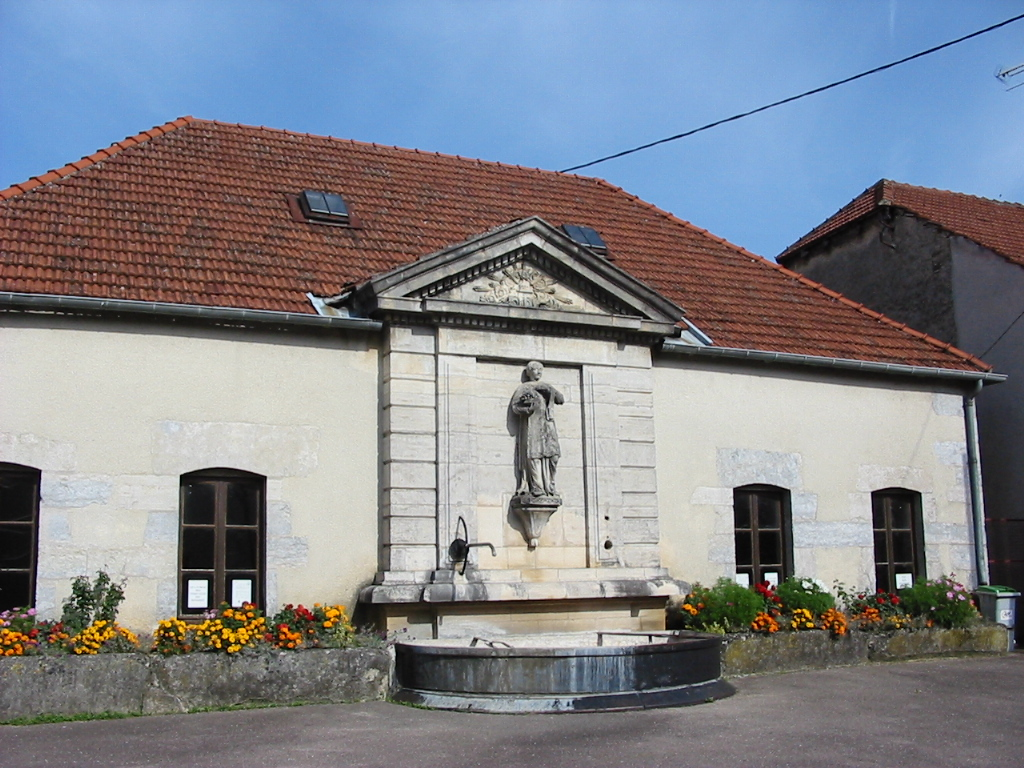
- Saint-Vincent fountain

- Coat of arms
- Location of Liffol-le-Grand
- Location within France Location within Grand Est
- Coordinates: 48°19′11″N 5°34′55″E
- Country: France
- Region: Grand Est
- Department: Vosges
- Arrondissement: Neufchâteau
- Canton: Neufchâteau
- Intercommunality: Ouest Vosgien

Government
  - Mayor (2020–2026): Cyril Vidot
- Area^{1}: 33.91 km^{2} (13.09 sq mi)
- Elevation: 310 m (1,020 ft)
- Highest elevation: 450 m (1,480 ft)
- Lowest elevation: 299 m (981 ft)
- Population (2023): 2,097
  - Density: 61.84/km^{2} (160.2/sq mi)
- Demonym(s): Liffolois, Liffoloises
- Time zone: UTC+01:00 (CET)
  - Summer (DST): UTC+02:00 (CEST)
- INSEE/Postal code: 88270 /88350
- ^{1} French Land Register data, which excludes lakes, ponds, glaciers > 1 km^{2} (0.386 sq mi or 247 acres) and river estuaries.

Liffol-le-Grand (French pronunciation: [lifɔl lə ɡʁɑ̃]) is a commune in the Vosges department in Grand Est in northeastern France.

== Population ==
Historical population
Year	Pop.	±% p.a.
1968	3,093	—
1975	3,207	+0.52%
1982	3,174	−0.15%
1990	2,812	−1.50%
1999	2,524	−1.19%
2007	2,360	−0.84%
2012	2,306	−0.46%
2017	2,144	−1.45%
2023	2,097	−0.37%
Source: INSEE

== See also ==
- Communes of the Vosges department
