= List of current heirs apparent =

This is the list of currents heirs apparent to the thrones of the world as of 28 October 2026 [refresh].

== Heirs apparent to sovereign monarchies ==
Country	Picture	Coat of arms	Name of heir apparent	Title(s)	Date of birth (age)	Became heir apparent	Relation to the monarch
Antigua and Barbuda; Australia; The Bahamas; Belize; Canada; Grenada; Jamaica; New Zealand; Papua New Guinea; Saint Kitts and Nevis; Saint Lucia; Saint Vincent and the Grenadines; Solomon Islands; Tuvalu; United Kingdom			William	Prince of Wales, Duke of Cornwall, Duke of Rothesay, Earl of Chester, Earl of Carrick, Baron of Renfrew, Lord of the Isles, and Prince and Great Steward of Scotland (The current holder is also Duke of Cambridge, Earl of Strathearn and Baron Carrickfergus.)	21 June 1982 (age 44)	8 September 2022	Elder son of King Charles III
Bahrain			Salman	Crown Prince of Bahrain, Prime Minister	21 October 1969 (age 57)	6 March 1999	Eldest son of King Hamad bin Isa Al Khalifa
Belgium			Elisabeth	Princess of Belgium, Duchess of Brabant	25 October 2001 (age 25)	21 July 2013	Eldest child of King Philippe
Bhutan			Jigme Namgyel Wangchuck	Dragon Prince of Bhutan, Druk Gyalsey of Bhutan	5 February 2016 (age 10)	5 February 2016	Elder son of King Jigme Khesar Namgyel Wangchuck
Brunei			Al-Muhtadee Billah	Crown Prince of Brunei Darussalam	17 February 1974 (age 52)	17 February 1974	Eldest son of Sultan Hassanal Bolkiah
Denmark			Christian	Crown Prince of Denmark, Count of Monpezat	15 October 2005 (age 21)	14 January 2024	Eldest child of King Frederik X
Jordan			Hussein	Crown Prince of Jordan	28 June 1994 (age 32)	28 November 2004	Elder son of King Abdullah II
Kuwait			Sabah Al-Khalid Al-Sabah	Crown Prince of Kuwait, Sheikh	3 March 1953 (age 73)	2 June 2024	Second cousin of Emir Mishal Al-Ahmad Al-Jaber Al-Sabah, maternal half-nephew
Lesotho			Lerotholi Seeiso	Crown Prince of Lesotho	18 April 2007 (age 19)	18 April 2007	Only son of King Letsie III
Liechtenstein			Alois	Hereditary Prince of Liechtenstein, Count of Rietberg	11 June 1968 (age 58)	13 November 1989	Eldest son of Prince Hans-Adam II
Luxembourg			Charles	Prince of Luxembourg	10 May 2020 (age 6)	3 October 2025	Elder son of Grand Duke Guillaume V
Monaco			Jacques	Hereditary Prince of Monaco, Marquis of Baux	10 December 2014 (age 11)	10 December 2014	Only legitimate son of Prince Albert II
Morocco			Moulay Hassan	Crown Prince of Morocco	8 May 2003 (age 23)	8 May 2003	Only son of King Mohammed VI
Netherlands			Catharina-Amalia	Princess of Orange	7 December 2003 (age 22)	30 April 2013	Eldest child of King Willem-Alexander
Norway			Ingrid Alexandra	Crown Princess of Norway	21 January 2004 (age 22)	28 August 2026	Eldest child of King Haakon VIII
Oman			Theyazin	Sayyid, Crown Prince of Oman	21 August 1990 (age 36)	12 January 2021	Elder son of Sultan Haitham bin Tariq
Saudi Arabia			Mohammed	Crown Prince of Saudi Arabia, Prime Minister	31 August 1985 (age 41)	21 June 2017	Son of King Salman bin Abdulaziz Al Saud
Sweden			Victoria	Crown Princess of Sweden, Duchess of Västergötland	14 July 1977 (age 49)	1 January 1980	Eldest child of King Carl XVI Gustaf
Tonga			Tupoutoʻa ʻUlukalala	Crown Prince of Tonga	17 September 1985 (age 41)	18 March 2012	Eldest son of King Tupou VI
United Arab Emirates			Khaled	Crown Prince of Abu Dhabi	8 January 1982 (age 44)	29 March 2023	Eldest son of President Mohamed bin Zayed Al Nahyan

== Heirs apparent to federated subnational monarchies ==
=== Malaysia ===
State	Image	Style	Current heir apparent	Date of birth (age)	Relationship with current monarch
Johor		Tunku Mahkota	Tunku Ismail Idris	30 June 1984 (age 42)	Eldest son of Sultan Ibrahim
Kedah		Raja Muda	Tengku Sarafudin Badlishah	2 March 1967 (age 59)	Eldest son of Sultan Sallehuddin
Pahang		Tengku Mahkota	Tengku Hassanal Ibrahim Alam Shah	17 September 1995 (age 31)	Eldest surviving son of Al-Sultan Abdullah
Perak		Raja Muda	Raja Ja'afar	26 September 1941 (age 85)	Fourth cousin once removed of Sultan Nazrin Shah
Perlis		Raja Muda	Tuanku Syed Faizuddin Putra Jamalullail	30 December 1967 (age 58)	Eldest son of Tuanku Syed Sirajuddin
Selangor		Raja Muda	Tengku Amir Shah	12 December 1990 (age 35)	Eldest son of Sultan Sharafuddin Idris Shah
Terengganu		Yang di-Pertuan Muda	Tengku Muhammad Ismail	1 March 1998 (age 28)	Eldest son of Sultan Mizan Zainal Abidin

=== United Arab Emirates ===
Emirate	Image	Heir apparent	Relationship to the monarch
Abu Dhabi		Khaled	Eldest son of Mohamed bin Zayed Al Nahyan
Ajman		Ammar	Eldest son of Humaid bin Rashid Al Nuaimi III
Dubai		Hamdan	Third son of Mohammed bin Rashid Al Maktoum
Fujairah		Mohammed	Eldest son of Hamad bin Mohammed Al Sharqi
Ras al-Khaimah		Mohammed	Eldest son of Saud bin Saqr Al Qasimi
Sharjah		Sultan	Cousin once removed of Sultan bin Muhammad Al-Qasimi; Wife's brother
Umm al-Quwain		Rashid	Son of Saud bin Rashid Al Mualla

== Current sovereign monarchs without an heir apparent ==
Country	Current monarch	Reason for no heir apparent	Coat of arms	Image	Current heir presumptive	Relationship
Andorra	Co-prince Josep-Lluís Serrano Pentinat	Ex officio as Bishop of Urgell; successor must be appointed by the Pope.	None			
Andorra	Co-prince Emmanuel Macron	Ex officio as President of France; successor must be elected by the French citizenry.	None			
Cambodia	King Norodom Sihamoni	New monarch will be elected.	None			
Eswatini	King Mswati III	Successor must be elected.	None			
Eswatini	Queen Mother Ntfombi	Successor must be elected.	None			
Japan	Emperor Naruhito	The Emperor has no sons.			Fumihito	Younger brother of Emperor Naruhito
Malaysia	Yang di-Pertuan Agong Ibrahim Iskandar	New monarch will be elected.			Nazrin Shah	Next in line in the de facto order of rotation
Qatar	Emir Tamim bin Hamad Al Thani	Successor must be appointed.			Abdullah	Half-brother of Emir Tamim bin Hamad Al Thani
Spain	King Felipe VI	The King has no sons.			Leonor	Elder daughter of King Felipe VI
Thailand	King Vajiralongkorn	The King has several children, but none named as crown prince.			Dipangkorn Rasmijoti	Legitimate son of King Vajiralongkorn
Vatican City	Pope Leo XIV	Successor must be elected in papal conclave.	None			

== Current federal or subnational monarchs without an heir apparent ==
Monarchy	Current monarch	Reason for no heir apparent	Image	Current heir presumptive	Relationship
Kelantan	Muhammad V	The Sultan has no legitimate children.		Tengku Muhammad Fakhry Petra	Youngest brother of Sultan Muhammad V
Negeri Sembilan	Tuanku Muhriz	Successor must be elected.			
Yogyakarta Sultanate	Hamengkubuwono X	The Sultan has no son.		Prince Hadisuryo (disputed)	Eldest younger brother of Sultan Hamengkubuwono X
Yogyakarta Sultanate	Hamengkubuwono X	The Sultan has no son.		Princess Mangkubumi (disputed)	Eldest daughter of Sultan Hamengkubuwono X

== See also ==
- List of current monarchs of sovereign states
- List of current heads of state and government
- List of heads of former ruling families
