= Princess Caroline of Monaco =

Princess of Monaco (born 1957)

- Princess of Hanover
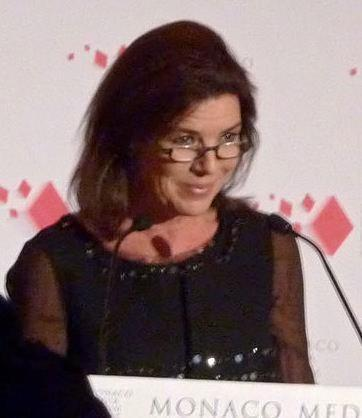
- Princess Caroline in 2009
- Born: 23 January 1957 (age 69); Prince's Palace, Monaco
- Spouses: Philippe Junot (m. 1978; div. 1980) Stefano Casiraghi (m. 1983; died 1990) Ernst August, Prince of Hanover (m. 1999)
- Issue: Andrea Casiraghi; Charlotte Casiraghi; Pierre Casiraghi; Princess Alexandra of Hanover
Names
- Caroline Louise Marguerite Grimaldi
- House: Grimaldi (by birth); Hanover (by marriage)
- Father: Rainier III, Prince of Monaco
- Mother: Grace Kelly

Princess Caroline of Monaco, Princess of Hanover (Caroline Louise Marguerite Grimaldi French pronunciation: [kaʁɔlin lwiz maʁɡəʁit ɡʁimaldi]; born 23 January 1957) is Princess of Hanover by marriage to Prince Ernst August. As the eldest child of Rainier III, Prince of Monaco, and Grace Kelly, she is the elder sister of Albert II, Prince of Monaco, and Princess Stéphanie.

She was Hereditary Princess of Monaco and heir presumptive to the Monegasque throne from her birth in 1957 until her brother Albert was born the following year, and again from Albert's accession in 2005 until the birth of his twins, her niece Gabriella and nephew Jacques, in 2014.

== Family and early life ==
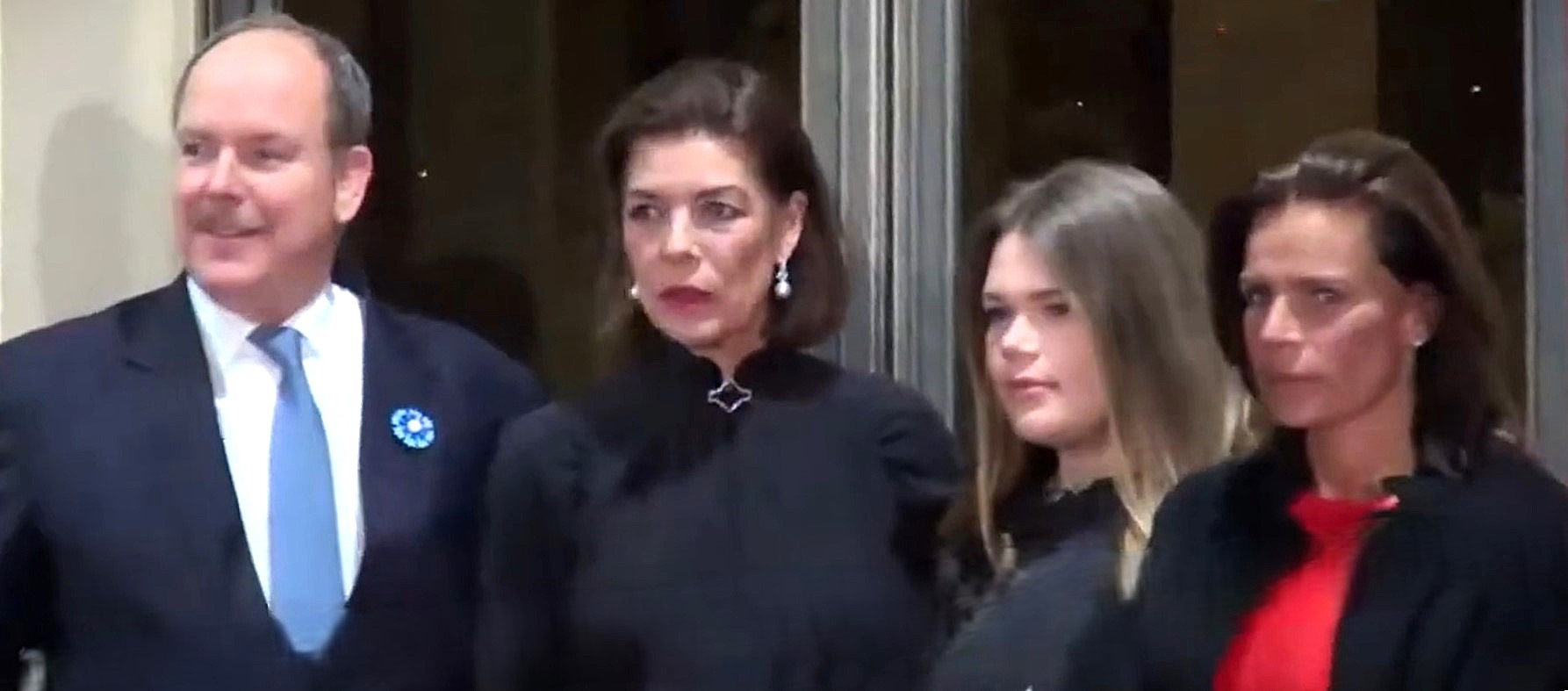
Left to right: Prince Albert, Princess Caroline, Camille Gottlieb, Princess Stéphanie at tribute to Grace Kelly in 2018

Caroline Louise Marguerite Grimaldi was born on 23 January 1957 in the Prince's Palace, Monaco. She is the eldest child of Rainier III, Prince of Monaco, and his wife, former American actress Grace Kelly. Christened Caroline Louise Marguerite, she belongs to the House of Grimaldi. She was the heir presumptive from her birth to 14 March 1958, when her brother Prince Albert was born. On 1 February 1965, her younger sister Princess Stéphanie was born. Caroline is a legitimate patrilineal descendant of the Dukes of Polignac, and as such belongs to the historical French nobility. Through her mother, she is of Irish and German descent.

In an interview for People in April 1982, shortly before her death, Grace described Caroline and Stéphanie as "warm, bright, amusing, intelligent and capable girls. They're very much in tune with their era. Besides being good students, they are good athletes – excellent skiers and swimmers. Both can cook and sew and play the piano and ride a horse. But, above all, my children are good sports, conscious of their position and considerate of others. They are sympathetic to the problems and concerns in the world today."

As a child, Caroline spent time at the home of her maternal grandparents, John B. Kelly, Sr. and Margaret Kelly (née, Majer), in Philadelphia. In addition to visiting her mother's family in the United States, she spent the summer of 1971 at Camp Oneka in the Poconos at the age of 14. While there, unbeknownst to her parents, Caroline was protected by the United States Secret Service.

Princess Grace died on 14 September 1982, the day after suffering a stroke while driving herself and Princess Stéphanie home to Monaco from a visit to France, resulting in an accident in which both were injured.

=== Education ===
The princess earned her French baccalauréat in 1974 with honours. She was also educated at St Mary's School Ascot. After a semester at Sciences Po, Caroline continued her studies at the Sorbonne University, where she earned a diploma in philosophy and minors in psychology and biology. She is fluent in French, English, Spanish, German and Italian.

== Activities ==
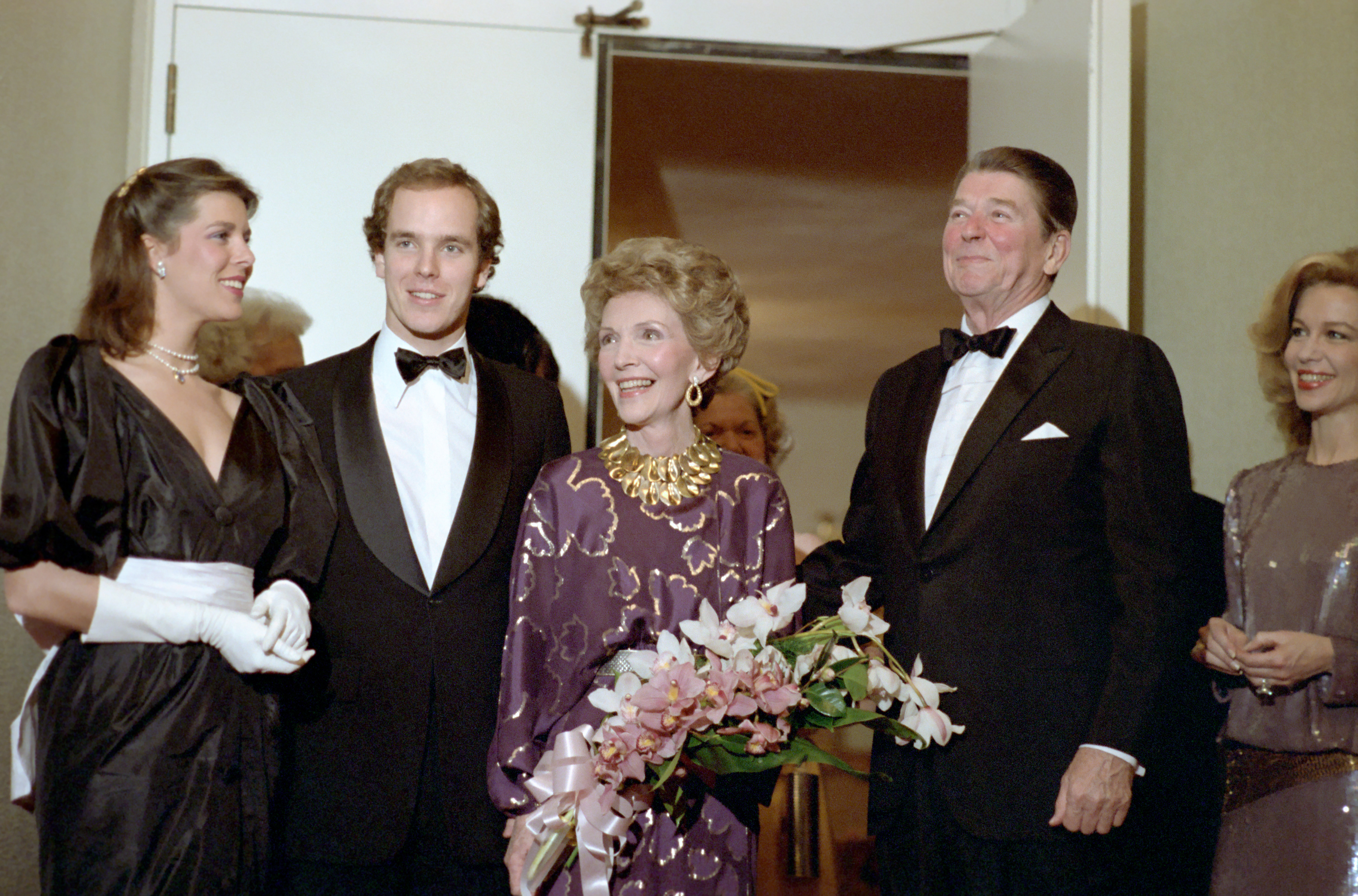
Princess Caroline and Albert, then Hereditary Prince of Monaco, with Ronald and Nancy Reagan in Washington, D.C., on 28 March 1983

In 1979, Princess Caroline was appointed by her parents as the president of the Monégasque Committee for the International Year of the Child. Two years later, in 1981, Caroline founded Jeune J'écoute association. The association set up a 'youth hotline' where young people can talk about their problems on the telephone with qualified people trained in dealing with problems young people faced. Other philanthropic organizations Caroline has been involved with include the World Association of Children's Friends (AMADE Mondiale), the Princess Grace Foundation, the Prince Pierre Foundation, and UNICEF.

Caroline is the Patron of Peter Le Marchant Trust, an organization that operates canal boat trips for ill and disabled people. Her other patronages include the International School of Paris, Les Ballets de Monte Carlo, which she also founded, the Monte-Carlo Philharmonic Orchestra, the Association des Guides et Scouts de Monaco, the Monte Carlo Garden Club and The Spring Arts Festival. In 1992, she was appointed the president of the International Contemporary Art Prize.

Following her mother's death in 1982, Caroline served as de facto first lady of Monaco until her brother married Charlene Wittstock in 2011. She regularly attends important social events in Monaco related to the Monégasque Princely Family, such as the National Day celebrations, the annual Rose Ball, the Red Cross Ball and the Formula One competition Monaco Grand Prix. Due to her commitment to philanthropy and arts, Caroline was named a UNESCO Goodwill Ambassador on 2 December 2003. The UNICEF honoured her with Children's Champion Award on 20 May 2006. The next year, she travelled to the Republic of South Africa to meet its former president Nelson Mandela. In December 2011, the World Association of Children's Friends honoured her for "tireless endeavours in continuing the organisation's legacy". Her personal friend and the Chanel head designer Karl Lagerfeld presented her the award. Caroline had also previously been given the Grand Cross of the Order of St. Charles, and had been appointed as the Commander of the Order of Cultural Merit.

=== Studio Caroline ===
In March 2023, Princess Caroline, acting as President of the Princess Grace Academy (of the Monte-Carlo Ballet) inaugurated Studio Caroline at the Villa Casa Mia. The project, which was first conceived in 2011, involved a significant technical feat of constructing the studio beneath the villa's historical gardens while restoring them to their original appearance upon completion. The inaugural plaque bears the inscription "Rêvé en 2011, réalisé en 2023" (Dreamed of in 2011, realized in 2023). The studio provides an additional advanced-level training space for the Academy, enhancing the institution's reputation as a first-rate center for classical dance and the Princess's own background as a supporter of the performing arts.

=== Médiathèque Caroline ===
In December 2025, and alongside Prince Albert II, Princess Caroline inaugurated the new headquarters of the Médiathèque Caroline (Caroline Media Library) within the Ilot Pasteur complex. The expansive facility serves as a unified multimedia hub, consolidating the Principality's previously separate youth library, ludothèque (games library), and video and audio collections. Under the Princess's patronage, the institution transitioned to a "free for all" community center in early 2025 to emphasize its priority of universal cultural access. The space includes a 118-seat auditorium and dedicated spaces for digital learning, reflecting the Princess's focus on modernizing Monaco's educational resources.

=== Writings ===
In April 1981, the Princess penned an essay, entitled "Home" and published in the International Herald Tribune's supplement. The byline was "Caroline de Grimaldi". In the essay, she wrote: "I long for the Mediterranean ... I feel in my bones that I belong in Monaco." The article was titled, "A Compulsive Need for Blue".

== Personal and media life ==
Caroline's personal interests include riding, swimming and skiing. Since her youth, she has been considered an international fashion icon and one of the best dressed women in the world. In November 2011, an exhibition honouring Princess Caroline was opened at the National Museum of Monaco.

Caroline was romantically linked to many famous men, including Guillermo Vilas; Henri Giscard d'Estaing, the son of former President of France Valéry Giscard d'Estaing; French singer Philippe Lavil; and Bobby Shriver, nephew of former U.S. President John F. Kennedy. Following her divorce from Philippe Junot, she was briefly engaged to Robertino Rossellini, the son of Roberto Rossellini and Ingrid Bergman. Between her second and third marriages, Caroline had a relationship with French actor Vincent Lindon.

=== First marriage ===
Princess Caroline's first husband was Philippe Junot (19 April 1940 – 8 January 2026), a Parisian banker. They were married civilly in Monaco on 28 June 1978, and religiously on 29 June 1978. Their lavish wedding ceremony was attended by some 650 guests, including Hollywood stars Ava Gardner, Cary Grant and Frank Sinatra.

The couple divorced, childless, on 9 October 1980. In 1992, the Catholic Church granted the princess an annulment.

=== Second marriage ===
Her second husband was Stefano Casiraghi (8 September 1960 – 3 October 1990), the sportsman heir to an Italian industrial fortune. They were married civilly in Monaco on 29 December 1983, and had three children:

- Andrea Albert Pierre Casiraghi (born on 8 June 1984 at Princess Grace Hospital Centre in Monaco). He married Tatiana Santo Domingo in a civil ceremony on 31 August 2013, at the Prince's Palace in Monaco-Ville. The couple have three children:
  - Alexandre "Sasha" Andrea Stefano Casiraghi (born on 21 March 2013 at Portland Hospital in London; entered the line of succession to the Monegasque throne when his parents married).
  - India Casiraghi (born on 12 April 2015 in London).
  - Maximilian Rainier Casiraghi (born on 19 April 2018 in Monaco).
- Charlotte Marie Pomeline Casiraghi (born on 3 August 1986 at Princess Grace Hospital Centre). Has a son with her former partner, the French actor and comedian Gad Elmaleh, and a second son with her husband, the French producer Dimitri Rassam:
  - Raphaël Elmaleh (born on 17 December 2013 at Princess Grace Hospital Centre).
  - Balthazar Rassam (born on 23 October 2018 at Princess Grace Hospital Centre).
- Pierre Rainier Stefano Casiraghi (born on 5 September 1987 at Princess Grace Hospital Centre). He married Beatrice Borromeo in a civil ceremony on 25 July 2015, in the gardens of the Prince's Palace in Monaco-Ville. They have three children:
  - Stefano Ercole Carlo Casiraghi (born on 28 February 2017 at Princess Grace Hospital Centre).
  - Francesco Carlo Albert Casiraghi (born on 21 May 2018 at Princess Grace Hospital Centre).
  - Bianca Caroline Marta Casiraghi (born on 4 October 2025 in Monaco).

The two younger children are named for their maternal great-grandparents, Princess Charlotte and Prince Pierre, while Andrea was named for a childhood friend of his father's. Stefano Casiraghi was killed in a speed-boating accident in 1990, aged 30 years.

Even though their parents had not married in the Church, as required under canon law, their marriage was convalidated by Pope John Paul II in February 1993, eight months after their mother's marriage to Junot had been annulled in June 1992.

=== Third marriage ===
Caroline's third and current husband is Prince Ernst August of Hanover, Duke of Brunswick, head of the House of Hanover, which lost the throne of the Kingdom of Hanover in 1866. From 1913 to 1918, his family ruled the sovereign Duchy of Brunswick (until the abolition of the monarchy).

The couple married in Monaco on 23 January 1999. Ernst August had previously divorced his first wife Chantal Hochuli, with whom he had sons: Prince Ernst August and Prince Christian.

The couple have one daughter together:

- Princess Alexandra Charlotte Ulrike Maryam Virginia of Hanover (born 20 July 1999 in Vöcklabruck, Austria)

Her husband's title as Duke of Brunswick is honorific since the ruling family of that state was removed by the Weimar Republic in 1918, along with all royal and noble German ruling families, which were still allowed to retain their titles. Neither she nor her husband has royal rank in Germany, but Monaco recognizes the Hanoverians' former German royal titles, attributing to the couple the style of Royal Highness. On 11 January 1999, shortly before Caroline and Ernst's wedding, his third cousin once removed (Queen Victoria was their common ancestor), Queen Elizabeth II of the United Kingdom, issued this Order in Council, "My Lords, I do hereby declare My Consent to a Contract of Matrimony between His Royal Highness Prince Ernst August Albert of Hanover, Duke of Brunswick-Luneburg and Her Serene Highness Princess Caroline Louise Marguerite of Monaco...". As a legitimate male-line descendant of George II, Ernst August was subject to the Royal Marriages Act 1772 (repealed in 2015). Prior to the repeal of the Act, the revised form of which limits those who must gain permission to the first six people in the line of British succession, marrying without the Queen's Royal Assent would have meant their marriage would be void in Britain, where Ernst August's family owned substantial property and he holds (dual) citizenship.

Likewise, the Monégasque court officially notified France of Caroline's contemplated marriage to Prince Ernst August and received assurance that there was no objection, in compliance with Article 2 of the 1918 Franco-Monégasque Treaty. Despite obtaining the official approval of the governments of France, Monaco and the United Kingdom, upon Caroline's marriage to Ernst August he forfeited his own place in Britain's order of succession. He is also subject to the Act of Settlement 1701, which imposes that consequence upon British dynasts who marry Roman Catholics. The Succession to the Crown Act of 2013 however removed that consequence of marrying a Roman Catholic, and would place him back in the order of succession.

In 2009, it was reported that Caroline had separated from Ernst August, sold the Le Mée Sur Seine house, and returned to live in Monaco.

=== Privacy cases ===
Caroline has had a bad relationship with media and paparazzi since her youth, when she complained she "could not live the life of a normal student". On 24 June 2004, the Princess obtained a judgement from the European Court of Human Rights condemning Germany for non-respect of her right to private life under Article 8 of the European Convention on Human Rights.

Caroline invoked the judgment in combination with articles 1(1) and 2(1) of the Basic Law (human dignity and personal freedom, respectively) as well as § 22 of the German Art and Photography Copyright Act or KunstUrhG (no publication of personal images without permission) in a new domestic case, attempting to get the courts to prohibit publication of certain images of her in a private setting. The Supreme Court accepted her claim with regard to two images, but did not prohibit publication of a third, stating that the image accompanied an article about a subject of public interest, which allows publication without permission per § 23 of the KunstUrhG. Caroline appealed to the Federal Constitutional Court, which affirmed the Supreme Court's judgement. Unsatisfied with this result, Caroline filed a new complaint with the European Court of Human Rights. This time, the court found that the domestic courts had properly weighed the competing interests of Caroline's privacy and the press' right to freedom of expression, and thus found that there had been no violation of Article 8.

== Succession issues ==
Princess Caroline was heir presumptive to the crown of Monaco until the birth of her brother and again from his accession until the birth of his legitimate children.

There was precedent for a Monégasque prince to adopt his own illegitimate child and thereby place that child at the head of the line of succession to the Monegasque throne, as was done for Caroline's grandmother, Princess Charlotte, Duchess of Valentinois. However, because of changes to the constitution of Monaco in 2002, this was no longer an option.

Albert's lack of legitimate children until the 2010s prompted Prince Rainier III to change the constitution so as to ensure there would be a successor to the throne, which strengthened the places of Caroline and her descendants in the line of succession. On 2 April 2002, Monaco passed Princely Law 1.249, which provides that if the Sovereign Prince assumes the throne and then dies without a legitimate direct heir, the throne will pass to his dynastic siblings and their descendants according to the rule of male-preference cognatic primogeniture. The law was then ratified by France, as required by a 1918 Franco-Monégasque Treaty, on 4 October 2005. Before this change, the crown of Monaco could pass only to a descendant of the last reigning prince, excluding such collateral relations as siblings, nephews, and nieces.

== Titles, styles, honours and arms ==
=== Titles and styles ===
- 23 January 1957 – 14 March 1958: Her Serene Highness The Hereditary Princess of Monaco
- 14 March 1958 – 28 June 1978: Her Serene Highness Princess Caroline of Monaco
- 28 June 1978 – 9 October 1980: Her Serene Highness Princess Caroline of Monaco, Mrs Philippe Junot
- 9 October 1980 – 29 December 1983: Her Serene Highness Princess Caroline of Monaco
- 29 December 1983 – 23 January 1999: Her Serene Highness Princess Caroline of Monaco, Mrs Stefano Casiraghi
- 23 January 1999 – 6 April 2005: Her Royal Highness The Princess of Hanover
- 6 April 2005 – 10 December 2014: Her Royal Highness The Hereditary Princess of Monaco, Princess of Hanover
- 10 December 2014 – present: Her Royal Highness The Princess of Hanover

=== Honours ===
==== National honours ====
- Monaco: Knight Grand Cross of the Order of Saint-Charles
- Monaco: Commander of the Order of Cultural Merit (10 November 2005 )
- (Kingdom of Hanover) House of Hanover: Knight of the Order of Saint George

==== Foreign honours ====
- Brazil: Grand Officer of the Order of Rio Branco (1 December 2022)
- France: Member of the Order of the Legion of Honour
- France: Commander of the Order of Agricultural Merit (3 July 2014)
- France: Commander of the Order of Arts and Letters (21 January 2014)
- France: Grand Cross of the National Order of Merit (6 October 2025)
- Sweden: Recipient of the 50th Birthday Medal of King Carl XVI Gustaf (30 April 1996)

==== International ====
- 2 December 2003 UNESCO Goodwill Ambassador

=== Arms and monograms ===
| Alliance coat of arms of Prince Ernst and Princess Caroline of Hanover | Royal monogram of Princess Caroline | Dual cypher of Prince Ernst and Princess Caroline |

== See also ==
- House of Grimaldi
- Succession to the Monegasque throne
- Monegasque Princely Family

Princess Caroline of Monaco House of Grimaldi Born: 23 January 1957
Lines of succession
| Preceded by The Countess of Carladès | Succession to the Monegasque throne 3rd in line | Succeeded by Andrea Casiraghi |
Monegasque royalty
| Preceded by Rainier | Hereditary Princess of Monaco; 23 January 1957 – 14 March 1958 | Succeeded by Albert |
| Preceded by Albert | Hereditary Princess of Monaco; 6 April 2005 – 10 December 2014 | Succeeded by Jacques |
Titles in pretence
| Vacant Title last held by Chantal Hochuli | — TITULAR — Duchess of Brunswick; Queen consort of Hanover by marriage 23 January 1999 – present | Incumbent |
