= Public holidays in Monaco =

This is a list of public holidays in Monaco.

== Public holidays ==
Date	English name	French name	Notes
1 January	New Year's Day	Jour de l’An	If this day falls on a Sunday, the next day will be a statutory holiday.
27 January	Saint Dévote's Day	La Sainte Dévote	
March or April	Easter Monday	Lundi de Pâques	
1 May	Labour Day	Fete du Travail	Celebration of the first day of May
May or June	Ascension Day	L’Ascension	The Thursday 40 days after Easter
May or June	Whit Monday	Lundi de Pentecôte	50 days after Easter
May or June	Corpus Christi	Fête-Dieu	The Thursday 60 days after Easter
15 August	Assumption Day	Assomption	
1 November	All Saints' Day	Toussaint	If this day falls on a Sunday, the next day will be a statutory holiday.
19 November	National Day	La Fête du Prince	The reigning prince chooses the day that will be National Day. If this day falls on a Sunday, the next day will be a statutory holiday.
8 December	Immaculate Conception	Immaculée Conception	
25 December	Christmas Day	Noël	If this day falls on a Sunday, the next day will be a statutory holiday.

== Other public holidays ==
At times, other public holidays are declared for certain occasions. The birth of Prince Albert II's twins, Princess Gabriella and Jacques, Hereditary Prince of Monaco, has been celebrated in a similar fashion to National Day and 7 January 2015 was declared a public holiday.

- Prince Rainier Day - 19 November
