= Charlene, Princess of Monaco =

Princess of Monaco since 2011

Charlene
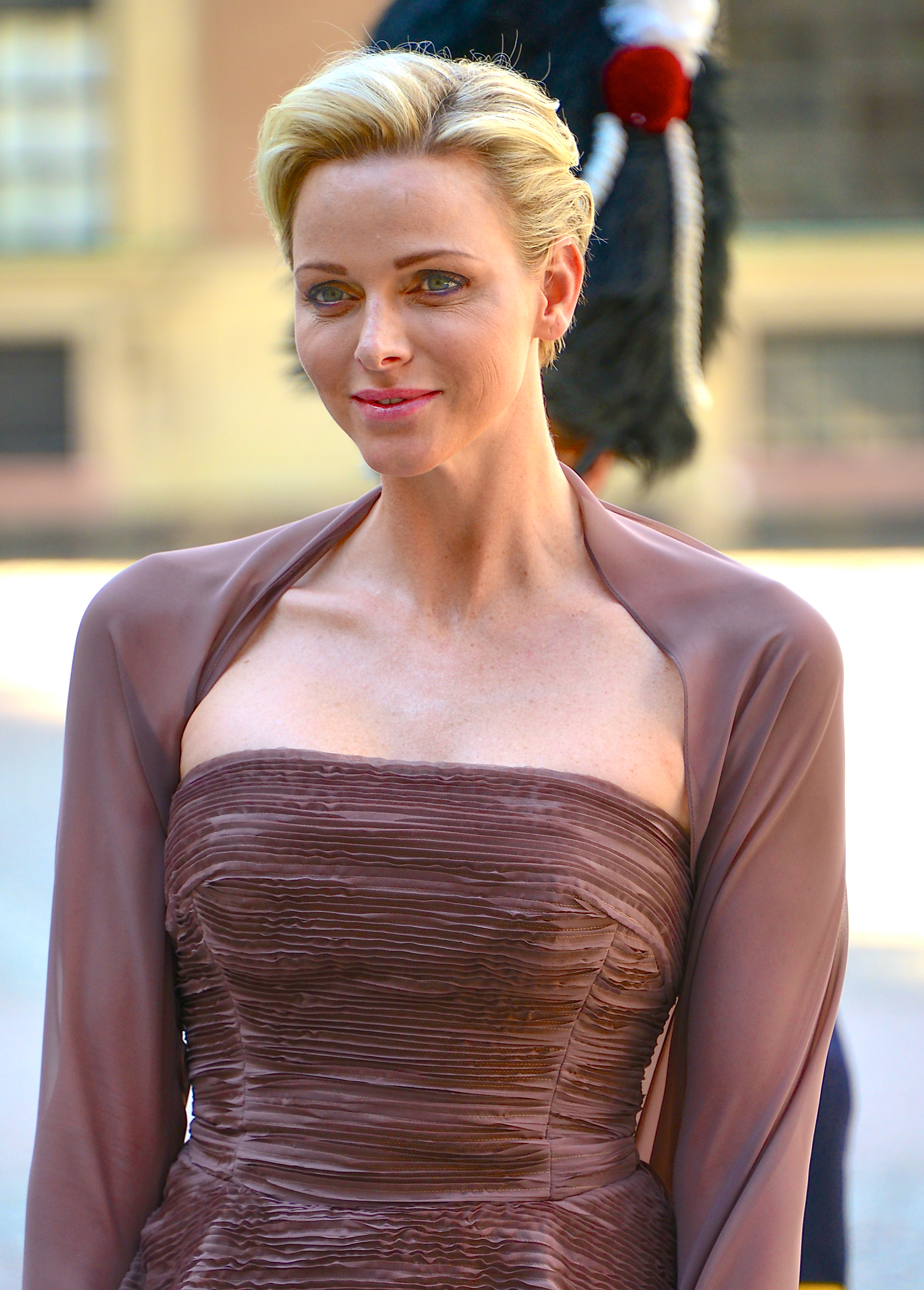
- Charlene in 2013

Princess consort of Monaco
- Tenure: 1 July 2011 – present
- Born: Charlene Lynette Wittstock; 25 January 1978 (age 48); Mater Dei Hospital, Bulawayo, Rhodesia (now Zimbabwe)
- Spouse: Albert II, Prince of Monaco (m. 2011)
- Issue: Princess Gabriella, Countess of Carladès; Jacques, Hereditary Prince of Monaco
- Father: Michael Wittstock
- Mother: Lynette Humberstone
- Religion: Catholicism
- Occupation: Swimmer
- Sports career
Medal record
Women's swimming
Representing South Africa
Commonwealth Games
Silver medal – second place	2002 Manchester	4 x 100 m medley
All-Africa Games
Gold medal – first place	1999 Johannesburg	100 m freestyle
Gold medal – first place	1999 Johannesburg	100 m backstroke
Gold medal – first place	1999 Johannesburg	4 x 100 m medley
Silver medal – second place	1999 Johannesburg	4 x 100 m freestyle

Charlene (French: Charlène [ʃaʁlɛn]; (Note: Since her marriage, her name has been Gallicised by adding a grave accent to her name in French documents.) born Charlene Lynette Wittstock, 25 January 1978) is Princess of Monaco as the wife of Prince Albert II. Before her marriage, Charlene was an Olympic swimmer representing South Africa.

Charlene was born in Bulawayo, Rhodesia (now Zimbabwe). She relocated to South Africa in 1989. She began her swimming career in 1996 (winning the South African Championship) and represented South Africa at the 2000 Sydney Olympics, with her team finishing fifth in the 4 × 100-metre medley relay. Charlene retired from professional swimming in 2007.

Charlene met Prince Albert at the Mare Nostrum swimming competition in Monte Carlo, Monaco, in 2000. The couple married on 1 July 2011. On 10 December 2014, she gave birth to twins Princess Gabriella and Hereditary Prince Jacques. Princess Charlene's charity work primarily revolves around sports, AIDS, and underprivileged children. Charlene founded the Princess Charlene of Monaco Foundation in 2012 to support her personal humanitarian endeavours.

== Early life and family ==
Charlene Lynette Wittstock was born on 25 January 1978 at Mater Dei Hospital in Bulawayo, Rhodesia (now Zimbabwe), to Michael Kenneth Wittstock (b. 1946), a sales manager, and Lynette, née Humberstone (b. 1954), a former competitive diver and swimming coach. The Wittstock family is of German origin; Wittstock's great-great-grandparents Martin Gottlieb Wittstock (1840–1915) and his wife Johanne Luise Wittstock (née Schönknecht; 1850–1932) emigrated to South Africa from the Pomeranian (then Prussian) village of Zerrenthin in northern Germany in 1861 to escape hardship. In South Africa, the Wittstocks worked as handyworkers and unsuccessfully prospected for diamonds. In 2014, she was given a certificate that verified her Irish ancestry.

Wittstock has two younger brothers: Gareth (1982), a coffeehouse businessman in Monaco, and Sean (1983), a promotions and events businessman in South Africa. The family relocated to South Africa in 1989, when Wittstock was 11 years old. She attended Tom Newby Primary school and Rynfield Primary School in Benoni, near Johannesburg, from 1988 to 1991. As a child, she was devastated by the drowning of her cousin Richard, who went swimming in the river at the back of her uncle's yard, explaining according to her, her later passion for swimming and concern for water safety.

== Swimming career ==
Wittstock won three gold medals and a silver medal at the 1999 All-Africa Games in Johannesburg. She represented South Africa at the 1998 and 2002 Commonwealth Games, winning a silver medal in the 4 × 100 m medley relay in the latter competition. She also was a member of the South African women's 4×100 m medley team at the 2000 Summer Olympics, which finished fifth. Wittstock finished sixth at the 2002 FINA Short Course World Championships for the 200 m breaststroke. Throughout her career, Wittstock gave swimming lessons to underprivileged children. She left her Durban-based team (the Seagulls) to join the Tuks Swimming Club at the High Performance Centre of the University of Pretoria. However, she never enrolled in classes. The Club sponsored her by providing her with free access to their pools, free coaching, accommodation, and gymnasium access.

Wittstock decided to leave Pretoria in January 2005, and returned to Durban; she then went to the north coast of KwaZulu-Natal, where she joined a former University of Pretoria swimming coach, Branislav Ivkovic. On 13 April 2007, Wittstock regained her title as South Africa's 50-metre women's backstroke champion when she completed the 50 m backstroke final at the Telkom SA National Aquatic Championships in 30:16 seconds, to finish third behind Australia's Sophie Edington and Brazil's Fabíola Molina. She planned to compete in the 2008 Summer Olympics in China as her swansong, but did not qualify. Previously, Wittstock had been out of competitive swimming for 18 months with a shoulder injury.

== Marriage ==
Wittstock met Albert II, Prince of Monaco, in 2000 at the Mare Nostrum swimming meet in Monaco. They made their public debut as a couple at the opening ceremony of the 2006 Winter Olympics. She accompanied him to the weddings of the Crown Princess of Sweden in 2010 and of the Prince of Wales in 2011.

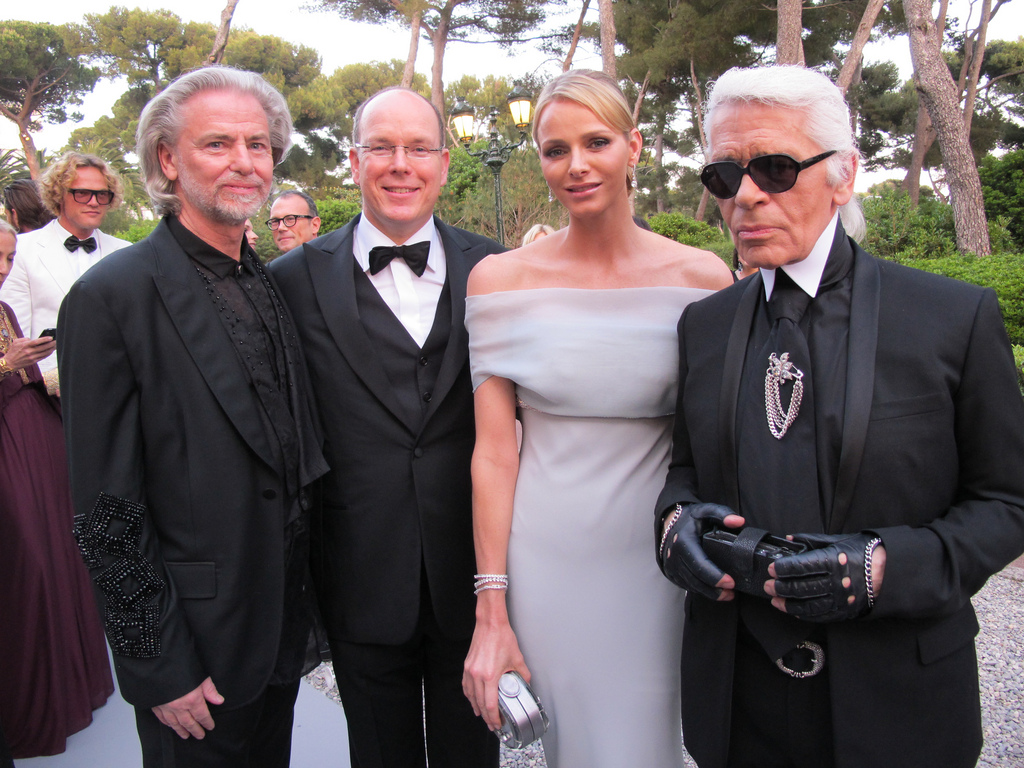
The Prince and Princess at the "Cinema Against AIDS" Gala with Karl Lagerfeld (right) in 2011

On 23 June 2010, the palace announced their engagement. Her engagement ring featured a pear-shaped three-carat diamond at the centre and surrounding diamond brilliants. The ring was reported to be created by Parisian jeweller Repossi. Wittstock, who was raised a Protestant, converted to Catholicism, despite it not being a requirement in the Constitution of Monaco. The future princess was also instructed in French and the Monégasque dialect, and became familiar with European court protocol.

The wedding was scheduled for 8 and 9 July 2011, but was moved forward to prevent a conflict with the International Olympic Committee (IOC) meeting in Durban on 5–9 July, which they both attended. The couple had invited members of the IOC, including President Jacques Rogge, to their wedding.

The couple was married in a civil ceremony on 1 July 2011 in the Throne Room of the Prince's Palace. The religious ceremony took place in the courtyard of the palace on 2 July, and was presided over by Archbishop Bernard Barsi. The couple honeymooned in Mozambique.

On 30 May 2014, the palace announced Charlene's pregnancy. It was confirmed on 9 October 2014 that the couple was expecting twins by the end of the year. On 10 December 2014, her twins were born at The Princess Grace Hospital Centre. Princess Gabriella was born first, followed by Hereditary Prince Jacques, who is heir apparent to the throne.

== Princess of Monaco ==
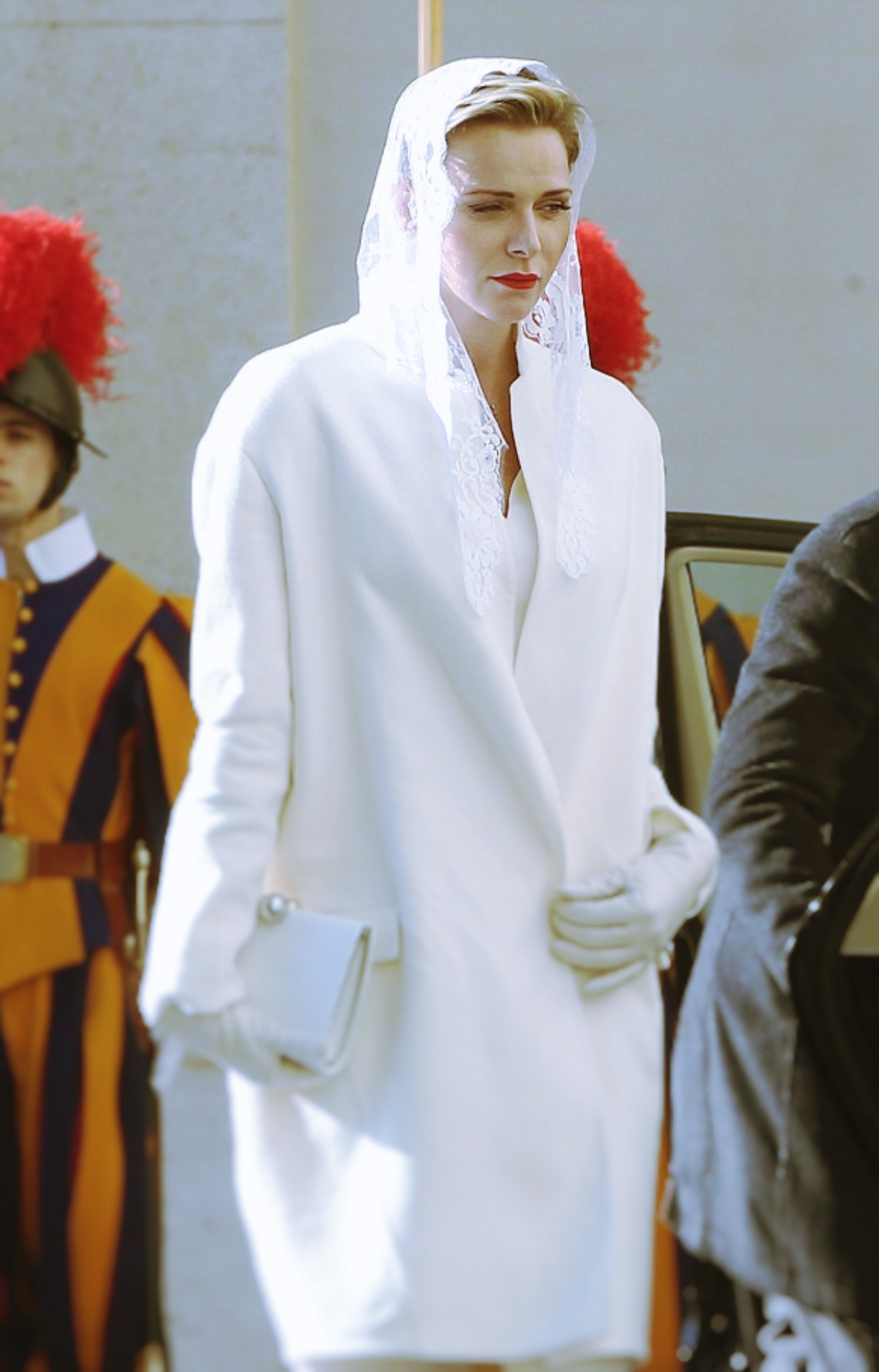
The Princess wearing white on an official state visit to Vatican City in 2016

Since 2009, she has been honorary president of Ladies Lunch Monte-Carlo. Since 2010, Princess Charlene has been associated with the Nelson Mandela Foundation. In May 2011, she became a global ambassador for the Special Olympics, promoting 'respect and inclusion' for people with intellectual disabilities worldwide. She has stated that the movement is close to her heart as a former athlete and values its role in "using the power of sport to change lives". In July 2011, she became a co-patron of Giving Organizations Trust, a group of South African charities that work with AIDS, underprivileged children, and environmentalism. Princess Charlene is a trustee of the Princess Grace Foundation-USA and attends their annual awards ceremony.

Charlene regularly participates in fundraising events for amfAR, The Foundation for AIDS Research. She is currently the honorary president of Monaco Against Autism. In 2012, she became the patron of AS Rugby Monaco and also the honorary president of Monaco Liver Disorder and the MONAA association. In October 2012, she accompanied the Prince on a visit to Warsaw, Poland. In 2014, Charlene was the recipient of the Champion of Children Award for her commitment to children's rights, presented by the Colleagues, a social services institution. In 2016, she became the patron of the South African Red Cross Society on its 68th anniversary. In September 2016, Charlene attended World First Aid Day in Geneva as an ambassador for the event.

The Princess created the Princess Charlene of Monaco Foundation in December 2012, with a mission to put an end to drowning using childhood awareness and preventive measures. In September 2014, she formally presented her foundation at the 10th Annual Clinton Global Initiative Meeting in New York City. In November 2015, Charlene partnered with the Pontifical Council and attended the 20th Annual Conference for Healthcare Workers at the Vatican, where she spoke about efforts against the global drowning epidemic. In June 2020, the Foundation made masks for residents of Monaco amidst COVID-19 pandemic. In October 2020, Charlene undertook a trip to Tbilisi, Georgia, on behalf of the Foundation. She visited the Olympic Village and sports facilities in conjunction with government officials, and later donated a travel bus to the Tbilisi Rugby Club Team. She also took meetings with Paralympic athletes and visited the Ai la foundation, a rehabilitation centre for children with hearing loss. She attended lunch with Salome Zourabichvili, the president of Georgia, at the Presidential Palace of Georgia, discussing diplomatic and philanthropic matters.

In January 2024, Charlene became the honorary president of Pink Ribbon Monaco, a campaign for the fight against breast cancer. In June 2024, Charlene was announced as one of the torchbearers for the Monégasque delegation at the Summer Olympics in Paris. A month later, Princess Charlene and Prince Albert visited Paris to attend the opening ceremony of the 2024 Summer Olympics.

In May 2026 she became Vice President of the Monégasque Olympic Committee.

She is the Vice president of the Monégasque Red Cross Society.

== Health ==
In May 2021, while on a trip to raise awareness about the issue of rhinoceros poaching in Southern Africa, Princess Charlene caught an ear, nose, and throat infection. She had a sinus lift and bone grafting procedure earlier in the spring. The condition led to problems with equalising pressure and prevented her from flying above 20,000 feet. She missed a scheduled appearance at the 2021 Monaco Grand Prix, as she was unable to travel back to Monaco. After multiple procedures, Charlene was medically advised to remain in South Africa, away from her family. Subsequently, she missed the tenth anniversary commemorations of her marriage in June, which Charlene stated was "extremely difficult" and saddened her. In August 2021, she underwent a four-hour surgery that required general anesthetic. In September 2021, she was hospitalised again because of a "medical emergency" pertaining to ENT complications. On 8 October 2021, it was announced that she had undergone a final procedure. She returned to Monaco on 8 November 2021.

On 16 November 2021, the palace announced that Charlene would be resting and that she had cancelled all her activities, including those of Monaco's national celebrations, owing to ill health, especially "deep fatigue". It was reported that she would spend her recovery period in a location outside Monaco. After a four-month stay at a Swiss clinic, the palace stated in March 2022 that Charlene was back in Monaco with her family and was expected to restart her duties gradually as her health further improved.

== Titles, styles and honours ==
=== Titles and styles ===
Since her marriage, Charlene has been styled as "Her Serene Highness Charlene, Princess of Monaco", and bears the historical titles of her husband in the feminine.

=== Honours ===
==== National honours ====
- Monaco:
  - Knight Grand Cross of the Order of Saint-Charles
  - Recipient of the Medal for Physical Education and Sports, First Class

==== Foreign honours ====
- France: Grand Cross of the Order of the Legion of Honour
- Italy:
  - Grand Cross of the Order of the Star of Italy
  - Knight Grand Cross of the Order of Merit of the Italian Republic
- Sovereign Military Order of Malta: Dame Grand Cross of Honour and Devotion of the Order of Saint John
- Poland: Grand Cross of the Order of Merit of the Republic of Poland
- Portugal: Grand Cross of the Military Order of Christ

=== Arms and emblems ===
Coat of arms of Charlene as Princess of Monaco	Royal monogram of Charlene as Princess of Monaco

== Notes ==
Monegasque royalty
Vacant Title last held by Grace Kelly	Princess consort of Monaco; 2011 – present	Incumbent
