= Jacques II =

Jacques II may refer to:

- Jacques II of Cyprus (c. 1438/1439 or c. 1440 – 1473)
- Jacques II de Chabannes (1470–1525)
- Potential regal name of Jacques, Hereditary Prince of Monaco
