= Princess Gabriella, Countess of Carladès =

Monégasque princess (born 2014)

Princess Gabriella
- Countess of Carladès
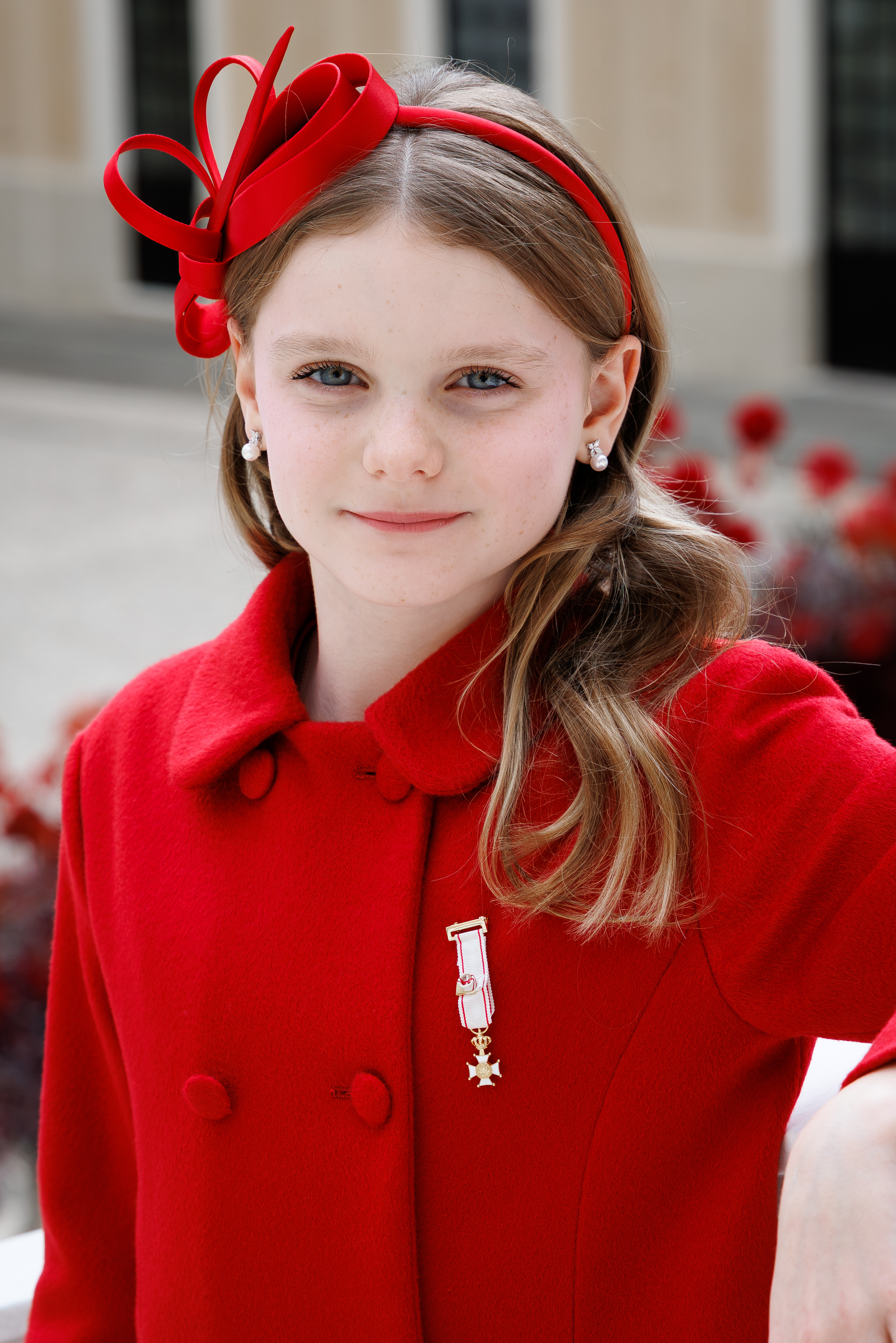
- Gabriella in 2025
- Born: 10 December 2014 (age 11); Princess Grace Hospital Centre, La Colle, Monaco
Names
- Gabriella Thérèse Marie Grimaldi
- House: Grimaldi
- Father: Albert II, Prince of Monaco
- Mother: Charlene Wittstock
- Religion: Catholicism

Princess Gabriella of Monaco, Countess of Carladès (Gabriella Thérèse Marie Grimaldi; born 10 December 2014), is the daughter of Prince Albert II and Princess Charlene. She is second in the line of succession to the Monegasque throne, behind her twin brother, Hereditary Prince Jacques.

== Birth and christening ==
Gabriella was born on 10 December 2014 at Monaco's Princess Grace Hospital Centre, two minutes before her brother, Hereditary Prince Jacques. She is the daughter of Prince Albert II, and Princess Charlene. Although born first, Monaco's male-preference primogeniture meant she was superseded in the line of succession when Jacques was born shortly afterwards. On the day of her birth, she received the title Countess of Carladès from her father. To mark the births, each twin was honoured with a salvo of 21 cannon shots from Fort Antoine, church bells rang for 15 minutes followed by boat horns, and the day was declared a public holiday. The twins were formally presented to the Monegasque people on 7 January 2015.

Gabriella and Jacques were baptised at the Cathedral of Our Lady Immaculate in Monaco-Ville on 10 May 2015. Her godparents are her maternal uncle Gareth Wittstock and Nerine Pienaar. At the ceremony, she was awarded the rank of Grand Officer of the Order of Grimaldi.

=== First Communion ===
Gabriella received her First Holy Communion on 11 May 2025, along with her brother, at the Cathedral of Our Lady Immaculate in Monaco-Ville. The siblings wore white albs.

=== Education ===
Gabriella and her brother have attended François d'Assise-Nicolas Barré School since 2021.

== Titles and honours ==
Monogram of Princess Gabriella of Monaco

=== Titles ===
Gabriella has been a Monégasque princess since birth and has additionally held the title Countess of Carladès.

=== Honours ===
- Monaco:
  - Grand Officer of the Order of Grimaldi (10 May 2015)

Princess Gabriella, Countess of Carladès House of Grimaldi Born: 10 December 2014
Lines of succession
Preceded by Prince Jacques	Succession to the Monegasque throne 2nd in line	Followed by The Princess of Hanover
Monegasque royalty
Preceded by Prince Albert II	Countess of Carladès; 10 December 2014 – present	Incumbent
