= Mater Dei Hospital (Bulawayo) =

- Franciscan Missionaries of the Divine Motherhood

Geography
- Location: Bulawayo, Chesterton Rd, Bulawayo City, Zimbabwe
- Coordinates: 20°10′12″S 28°34′48″E

Organisation
- Type: Community

Services
- Emergency department: Yes
- Beds: 169

Helipads
- Helipad: No

History
- Founded: 1950s

Links
- Lists: Hospitals in Zimbabwe

Mater Dei Hospital (MDH), also known simply as Mater Dei, is an acute Catholic founded charitable hospital that provides health services and specialist services. It is a Public hospital located in Bulawayo, Zimbabwe. Mater Dei Hospital is owned and operated by a board of trustees which include the Franciscan Missionaries of the Divine Motherhood.

== History ==
Mater Dei Hospital was founded in the 1950s by the Franciscan nuns. It is a Catholic health institution led by the board of trustees.

Charlene, Princess of Monaco, former Olympic swimmer was born in 1978 at Mater Dei.

== Services ==
Services provided at the Mater Dei hospital include:

- Accident and Emergency
- Intensive Care Unit
- High-dependency unit
- Paediatrics
- Surgical
- Obstetrics
- X-ray.

== Notable births and deaths ==
=== Births ===
- Charlene, Princess of Monaco Olympic swimmer and the Princess of Monaco, 1978

=== Deaths ===
- Fletcher Dulini Ncube politician, 2014
- Janet Banana First Lady of Zimbabwe, 2021
- Simon Khaya Moyo politician and Chairman of ZANU-PF, 2021
- Watson Khupe disability activist and politician, 2022
