= The Spring Arts Festival =

The Festival Printemps des Arts de Monte-Carlo is a music and dance festival in Monaco, which was created in response to the wishes of Princess Grace and which is today under the patronage of Princess Caroline of Hanover.
