= Fletcher Dulini Ncube =

Zimbabwean politician (1940–2014)

Fletcher Dulini Ncube (9 January 1940 - 11 September 2014) was a Zimbabwean politician who served as the Member of Parliament for Lobengula-Magwegwe. He was born at the Hope Fountain Mission in Zimbabwe on January 9, 1940.

Dulini Ncube was a founding member of the Movement for Democratic Change political party, originally serving as its treasurer. As a critic of Robert Mugabe and his government, he was frequently the target of political oppression. He was arrested in 2001 and denied medical treatment for his diabetes, resulting in the loss of an eye. In 2002, several MDC members, including Dulini Ncube, were charged with the murder of war veteran Cain Nkala, but were acquitted of all charges. These arrests prompted attention from Amnesty International, who condemned the prosecution as unfair.

When the original MDC split in 2005, he remained with the portion led by Welshman Ncube, known in the 2008 election as the Movement for Democratic Change – Mutambara.

He died in 2014 at Mater Dei Hospital in Bulawayo. He was buried at Lady Stanley Cemetery in Bulawayo.
