= Hereditary Prince of Monaco =

Heir to the throne of the Principality of Monaco

The Hereditary Prince(ss) of Monaco is the title given to the heir apparent or heir presumptive of the Monegasque throne, since its official creation on 15 May 1882. Traditionally, a male Hereditary Prince is also given the title Marquis of Baux. Like the Reigning Sovereign Prince and all other members of the Princely Family, the Hereditary Prince or Hereditary Princess is styled His or Her Serene Highness.

== List of Hereditary Princes(ss) of Monaco ==
Portrait	Name	Tenure		Length
	Albert (I)	15 May 1882	10 September 1889	7 years, 118 days
	Louis (II)	10 September 1889	26 June 1922	32 years, 289 days
	Charlotte	26 June 1922	30 May 1944	21 years, 338 days
	Rainier (III)	30 May 1944	9 May 1949	4 years, 344 days
	Caroline	23 January 1957	14 March 1958	1 year, 50 days
	Albert (II)	14 March 1958	6 April 2005	47 years, 23 days
	Caroline	6 April 2005	10 December 2014	9 years, 248 days
	Jacques (Note: Princess Gabriella, Jacques' twin sister, was born before him and so was heir presumptive of the throne for two minutes, but she wasn't granted the title because of Monaco's male-preference primogeniture.)	10 December 2014	Incumbent	11 years, 321 days

== See also ==
- Succession to the Monegasque throne
