= Jacques, Hereditary Prince of Monaco =

Heir apparent to the Monégasque throne (born 2014)

Jacques
- Hereditary Prince of Monaco; Marquis of Baux
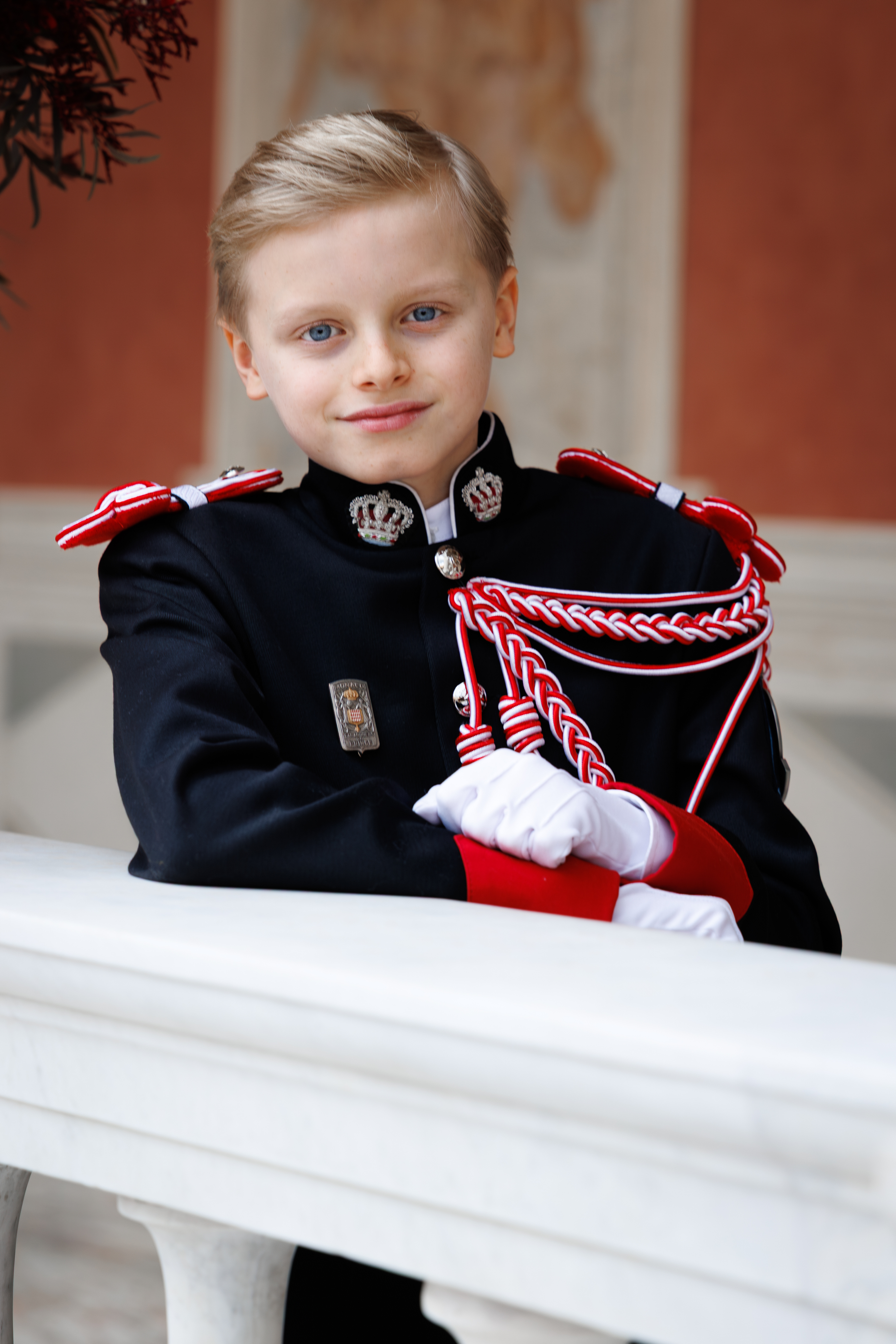
- Jacques in 2025
- Born: 10 December 2014 (age 11); Princess Grace Hospital Centre, La Colle, Monaco
Names
- Jacques Honoré Rainier Grimaldi
- House: Grimaldi
- Father: Albert II, Prince of Monaco
- Mother: Charlene Wittstock
- Religion: Catholicism

Jacques, Hereditary Prince of Monaco, Marquis of Baux (Jacques Honoré Rainier Grimaldi; born 10 December 2014), is the heir apparent to the Monegasque throne. He is the son of Prince Albert II and Princess Charlene, and the twin brother of Princess Gabriella. He also holds the title of Marquis of Baux, which all the heirs apparent to the crown of Monaco have held since 1643.

== Birth and christening ==
Jacques was born on 10 December 2014 at Monaco's Princess Grace Hospital Centre, two minutes after his sister, Princess Gabriella. He is the son of Prince Albert II and Princess Charlene. Charlene later explained that she chose the name Jacques because it is common in her homeland, and that his middle names, Honoré and Rainier, reflect long‑standing associations with previous rulers of Monaco. He received the title Marquis of Baux from his father. To mark the births, each twin was honoured with a salvo of 21 cannon shots from Fort Antoine, church bells rang for 15 minutes followed by boat horns, and the day was declared a public holiday. The twins were formally presented on 7 January 2015, which was also declared a public holiday in Monaco. Jacques and Gabriella were baptised at the Cathedral of Our Lady Immaculate in Monaco-Ville on 10 May 2015. His godparents are his distant cousins Christopher Le Vine Jr. and Diane de Polignac Nigra. At the ceremony, he was awarded the Grand Cross of the Order of Grimaldi. A certified copy of the legal document is safeguarded in the Monaco cathedral, while another is held at Bank of Monaco – Credit Suisse.

=== First Communion ===
Jacques received his First Holy Communion on 11 May 2025, along with his sister, at the Cathedral of Our Lady Immaculate in Monaco-Ville. On this occasion, the siblings wore white albs.

=== Education ===
Jacques and his sister have attended François d'Assise-Nicolas Barré School since 2021.

== Titles and honours ==
Princely monogram of Prince Jacques of Monaco

=== Titles ===
Since birth, Jacques has been a Monégasque prince and the heir apparent to the throne. As heir, his formal title in French is Prince Héréditaire While literally translated as "Hereditary Prince", in English the title has also been translated as "Crown Prince". In addition, Jacques was also granted the title Marquis of Baux from birth.

=== Honours ===
- Monaco:
  - Knight Grand Cross of the Order of Grimaldi (10 May 2015)

== See also ==
- List of current heirs apparent

Jacques, Hereditary Prince of Monaco House of Grimaldi Born: 10 December 2014
Lines of succession
First Heir apparent	Succession to the Monegasque throne 1st in line	Followed by Princess Gabriella
Monegasque royalty
Preceded by Princess Caroline	Hereditary Prince of Monaco¹; 10 December 2014 – present	Incumbent
Preceded by Prince Albert II	Marquis of Baux; 10 December 2014 – present	Incumbent
Notes and references
1. Since his birth the palace is referred him as Crown Prince.
