= Order of Grimaldi =

Award established in Monaco in 1954

Order of Grimaldi Ordre de(s) Grimaldi
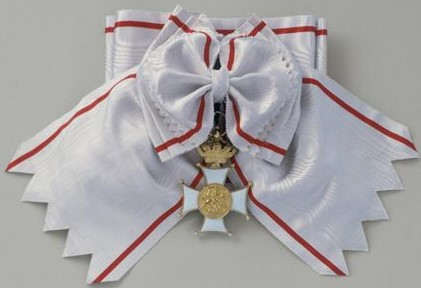
- Grand Cross badge and sash

Awarded by Prince of Monaco
- Type: House Order
- Established: 18 November 1954
- Awarded for: people who have contributed to the prestige of the Principality with distinction
- Status: Currently constituted
- Grand Master: Albert II, Prince of Monaco
- Chancellor: Raoul Biancheri, Plenipotentiary Minister
- Grades: Knight-Grand Cross, Grand Officer, Commander, Officer, Knight

Precedence
- Next (higher): Order of the Crown
- Next (lower): Order of Cultural Merit
- Ribbon bar of the Order of Grimaldi

The Order of Grimaldi (usually called Ordre de Grimaldi but officially Ordre des Grimaldi according to the Ordonnance) is an Order established in Monaco on 18 November 1954.

== Award ==
It is awarded to people who have contributed to the prestige of the Principality with distinction. As the Order rewards personal service to the Sovereign Prince of Monaco, it is awarded on the sole discretion of the Grand Master, currently Albert II, Prince of Monaco.

=== Reception ===
According to the statutes, and except for Members of the Princely Family and foreigners, one can only receive the Order first with the rank of Knight. To be awarded the following higher ranks, one must keep the lower rank during the following times:

- Officer: four years as a Knight
- Commander: three years as an Officer
- Grand Officer: four years as a Commander
- Knight Grand Cross: five years as a Grand Officer

Nominations belong to the Grand Master. The Chancellor proposes promotions. According to the Prince's orders, the Chancellor proposes the projects of nomination and promotion ordonnances. The grantees must be received in the Order before wearing the decorations. The Grand Master receives the Grand Crosses, Grand Officers and Commanders. The Chancellor receives the Officers and Knights; there is one exception: foreigners will be admitted in the Order, but not received.

=== Military honors ===
A member of the Order wearing the decorations will be honoured by the carabiniers as such:

- Command "Right shoulder, ARMS" (Portez, Armes) for Officers and Knights and
- Command "Present, ARMS" (Présentez, Armes) for Knight-Grand Crosses, Grand Officers and Commanders.

== Grades ==
The Order has five classes:

- Knight Grand Cross, which wears the badge on a sash on the right shoulder, plus the star on the left chest;
- Grand Officer, which wears the badge on a necklet, plus the star on the right chest;
- Commander, which wears the badge on a necklet;
- Officer, which wears the badge on a ribbon with rosette on the left chest;
- Knight, which wears the badge on a plain ribbon on the left chest.

Ribbon bars
Knight-Grand Cross	Grand Officer	Commander	Officer	Knight

== Insignia ==
- The badge of the Order is a white-enamelled Maltese Cross, in silver for Knight class, in gilt for higher classes. The obverse central disc is in gilt, bearing a mounted knight carrying the coat-of-arms of Monaco (actually that of the Grimaldi family), surrounded by the legend "Rainer Grimaldi, Prince de Monaco". The reverse central disc, also in gilt, bears the year "1950" and the legend "Principauté de Monaco". The badge is topped by a crown.
- The star of the Order is a modern design in silver, formed by 16 rhombs (from the coat-of-arms of the Grimaldi family and of Monaco) arranged in a circle. The gilt central disc is the same as that on the obverse of the badge.
- The ribbon of the Order is white, with a thin red stripe near (but not touching) the edge of the ribbon.

== Legal basis ==
- Ordonnance n° 1.028 of 18/11/1954 instituting the Order of Grimaldi: Text (French)
- The statutes of the Order of Saint-Charles (text of the ordonnance in French) are used for the Order of Grimaldi, with "Chancellor of the Order of Grimaldi" instead of "Chancellor of the Order of Saint-Charles" where needed.
