= Marquis of Baux =

Subsidiary title of the Prince of Monaco

Marquis of Baux (French: Marquis des Baux) is a subsidiary title of the prince of Monaco. When possible, the title passes from the reigning prince to the first male heir apparent or heir presumptive of the Monegasque throne.

The present bearer of the title is Hereditary Prince Jacques. The marquisate was associated with the town of Les Baux-de-Provence, but later lost its administrative authority when control of the town reverted to France.

The title of "lord of Baux" had been used by other families previously. King Louis XIII of France re-granted the lordship as a marquisate to Prince Honoré II of Monaco by the Treaty of Péronne on 14 September 1641. The new title was first used by Honoré's only son, Ercole. Ercole died before his father, and thus the title has been granted for several centuries to the heirs of the prince of Monaco.

== List of titleholders ==
Name	Tenure	Length
Ercole	14 September 1641 – 2 August 1651	9 years, 322 days
Louis I	2 August 1651 – 10 January 1662	10 years, 161 days
Antoine I	10 January 1662 – 20 February 1731	69 years, 41 days
Honoré III	20 February 1731 – 17 May 1758	27 years, 86 days
Honoré IV	17 May 1758 – 21 March 1795	36 years, 308 days
Honoré V	21 March 1795 – 16 February 1819	23 years, 332 days
Florestan	16 February 1819 – 2 October 1841	22 years, 228 days
Charles III	2 October 1841 – 20 June 1856	14 years, 262 days
Albert I	20 June 1856 – 10 September 1889	33 years, 82 days
Louis II	10 September 1889 – 30 May 1944	54 years, 263 days
Rainier III	30 May 1944 – 14 March 1958	13 years, 288 days
Albert II	14 March 1958 – 10 December 2014	56 years, 271 days
Jacques	10 December 2014 – present	10 years, 174 days

== See also ==
- Lords of Baux
- Hereditary Prince of Monaco
