= Repossi =

Italian jewelry house

Repossi S.A.S.
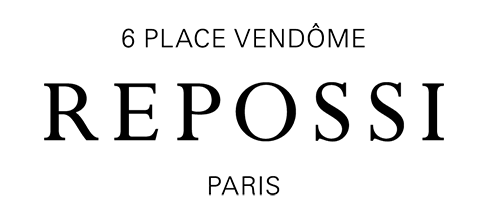
- Industry: Luxury goods
- Founded: 1957; 69 years ago in Turin, Italy
- Founder: Costantino Repossi
- Headquarters: Paris, France
- Key people: Costantino Repossi, Alberto Repossi, Gaia Repossi (Creative Director)
- Products: jewellery
- Owner: LVMH (68%)
- Website: repossi.com

Repossi S.A.S. (/rəˈpoʊsi/ ruh-POH-see) is an Italian jewelry house founded in 1957 in Turin by Costantino Repossi, a family-owned business now run by the third generation of the Repossi family. The luxury group LVMH is a majority shareholder since 2018.

== History ==
Repossi was founded in 1957 in Turin, Italy. After studying industrial design, Constantino Repossi took over his father’s Italian workshops in the postwar period. He founded the brand, developed Art Deco-inspired jewelry pieces, and opened the first boutique in Turin. His son Alberto became director in 1974 and opened his first boutique at Square Beaumarchais in Monte Carlo in 1978. He moved to 6 Place Vendôme in Paris in 1986. In 1994, the brand became the official supplier to H.S.H. Prince Rainier III of Monaco and created the engagement ring for H.S.H. Charlène of Monaco.

In 1997, the company gained international recognition after Dodi Fayed purchased a ring from company's "Dis-Moi Oui" ("Just Say Yes") collection for Diana, Princess of Wales. The two had been spotted at the Monegasque boutique, and the press speculated about a potential engagement with this ring. Alberto Repossi confirmed the decision to create a bespoke piece for Diana based on a model from the "Dis-Moi Oui" collection, along with variations on a bracelet and other items.

After studying fine arts, Gaia Repossi, representing the third generation, took over the company’s artistic and creative direction at the age of 21. She draws inspiration from art and architecture (Donald Judd, Richard Serra, Robert Mapplethorpe, Tadao Ando) to create new jewelry styles, such as knuckle rings like the Berbere Twin, and has made the earcuff her signature aesthetic.

In late November 2015, Repossi partnered with LVMH, with the luxury group acquiring a minority stake of approximately 40%. Three years later, LVMH became the majority shareholder of the Italian brand, and it was officially integrated into the Watches and Jewelry division starting in 2022.

The flagship boutique, located on Place Vendôme since 1986, was redesigned by Gaia Repossi and architect Rem Koolhaas (OMA) in 2016 to serve as an architectural statement. The interior is highly contemporary and a stark departure from the typical style of luxury jewelry boutiques, reflecting Repossi’s contemporary vision. The Monaco boutique was redesigned by artist Flavin Judd in 2020.

Repossi crafts “black gold” using an 18-karat white gold base coated in ruthenium and set with diamonds. This black gold is featured in rings, necklaces, bracelets, and earrings within the Antifer collection.

Repossi’s minimalist and architectural aesthetic has captivated several Hollywood stars, including Cate Blanchett, Demi Moore, Emma Stone, Rihanna, and Hailee Steinfeld.

== Style ==
In 2013, Gaia Repossi won the "Best jewelry designer of the Year" award at the Elle Style Awards.

== Collections ==
- 2011 : Berbere
- 2013 : Berbere Module ring
- 2013 : Antifer
- 2014 : Antifer Heart
- 2014 : Serti Sur Vide
- 2018 : Blast High Jewelry
- 2019 : Blast Jewelry
- 2020 : Berbere Chromatic rings
- 2020 : Serti Inversé
- 2024 : Antifer Chromatic

Repossi releases a limited-edition collection twice a year, during Paris Fashion Week. Gaia Repossi and the Creative Studio design 15 pieces that draw on the brand’s avant-garde and minimalist heritage. The pieces are available exclusively in-store.

- March 2026: « THE ANTIFER MEN’S VARIATION RING »
- 2025: « CROSS BRACELET » and « SPHERE EARRINGS »
- 2024: « BERBERE METRIC RING » and « PEARL VARIATION »
- 2023: « ONYX ANTIFER PENDANT »
- 2022: « THE TRANSIENT RING »

== Locations ==
Repossi boutiques are in Paris, Monaco, Dubaï, Abou Dhabi, Riyad, Tokyo and London.

== Artistic collaborations ==
In 2020, Repossi sponsored the first retrospective of artist Donald Judd at MoMA (Museum of Modern Art) in New York.

In 2021, Repossi presented a unique and exclusive collection of 15 pieces of fine jewelry paying tribute to the early career of Robert Mapplethorpe. Gaia Repossi spent three years gathering and reinterpreting the pieces the photographer created using all sorts of objects. The result is a collection crafted from precious materials and imbued with various symbolic meanings, referencing the multitude of objects Robert Mapplethorpe used at the time to create his jewelry: rabbit feet, dice, crab claws, pearls, etc.

In 2023, Repossi celebrates the 10th anniversary of the Antifer collection with an artistic curation by gallery owner Amélie du Chalard. Several artists have reinterpreted theAntifer collection using different materials and techniques while paying tribute to Antifer’s minimalism and precision.

In 2024, Repossi is sponsoring the exhibition “Brancusi, Art Is Just Beginning,” the first major retrospective dedicated to the Romanian sculptor, at Centre Pompidou in Paris.

In 2025, Repossi collaborated with Invisible Collection to develop creations that blend jewelry and architecture. Four designers participated, each creating an object inspired by a specific collection: Charles Zana with a brushed walnut lamp inspired by Antifer, Louise Liljencrantz with a jewelry box inspired by Berbère, the Campbell-Rey duo with a pair of Murano glass tables floating on steel inspired by Serti Sur Vide, and finally Courtney Applebaum with a mirror made of stacked gold-plated metal rings reminiscent of the Blast collection.

That same year, the house continued to strengthen its ties to contemporary art through a collaboration between Gaia Repossi and Sterling Ruby. Together, they created a brooch, produced in a limited edition of just five pieces. This brooch is crafted in champagne-colored 18-karat gold, set with a 2.10 mm round diamond in a polished bezel, designed with a pivot system and a beveled cutout. This piece is inspired by the artist’s “REIF” series, featuring cylindrical metallic lines and shapes.

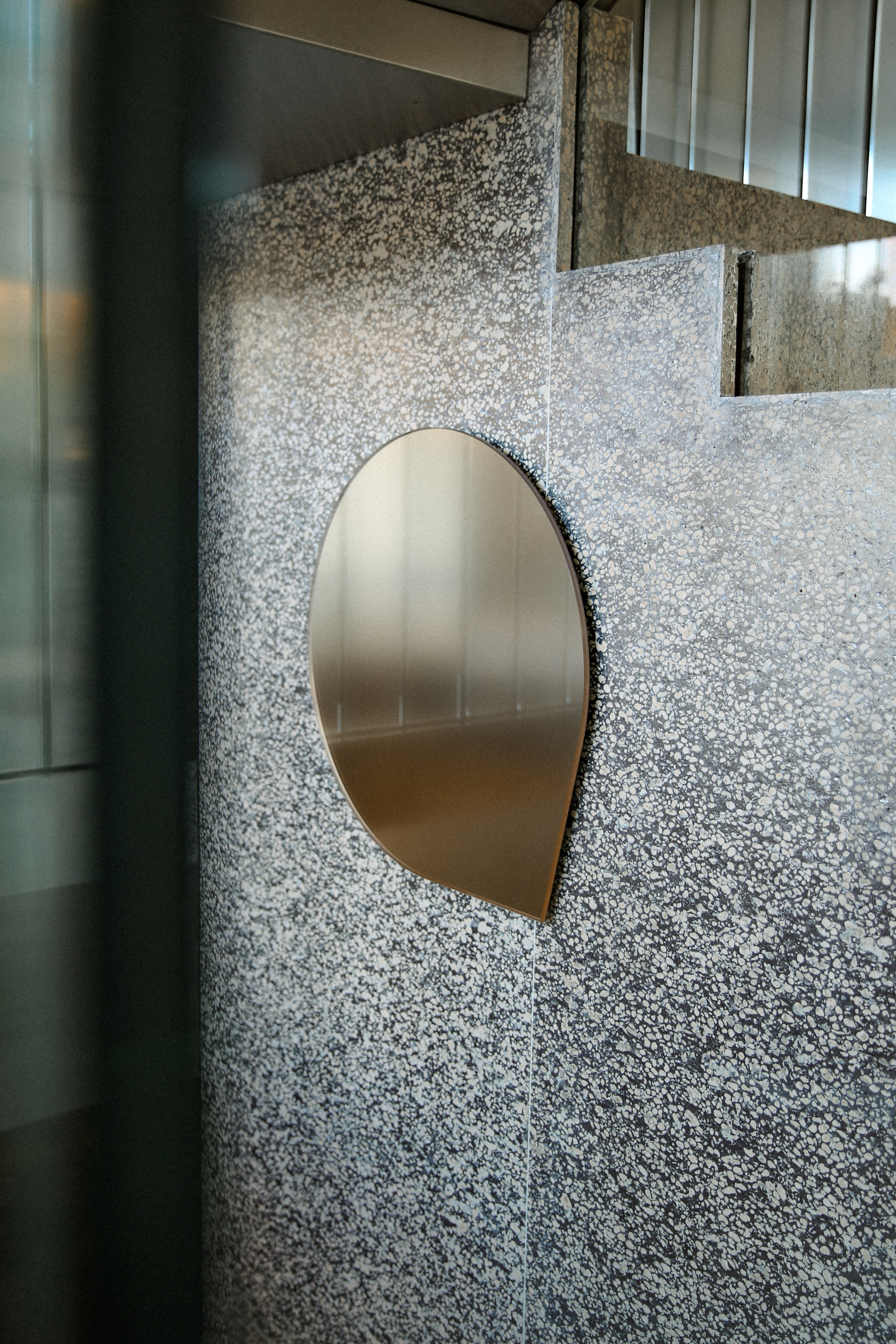

In 2026, Repossi invited designer Sabine Marcelis to reinterpret the iconic Antifer collection. The artist created a series of mirrors featuring luminous gradients.

That same year, Repossi collaborated with Crosby Studios to mark the 40th anniversary of the Place Vendôme boutique with a conceptual installation shaped like the Place Vendôme and filled with various objects inspired by jewelry.

== Commitments ==
Since 2022, Repossi has been partnering with the Moyo Gems association (a program designed to support the economic independence of female miners in Tanzania through a direct, fully traceable supply chain) and has developed a limited-edition Chromatics Sapphires collection, which incorporates the design elements and lines of the Serti Sur Vide collection using unique sapphires, thanks to their varied shapes (pear, oval, or heart) and, above all, a variety of hues featuring shades of orange, pink, lilac, or even green-gray.

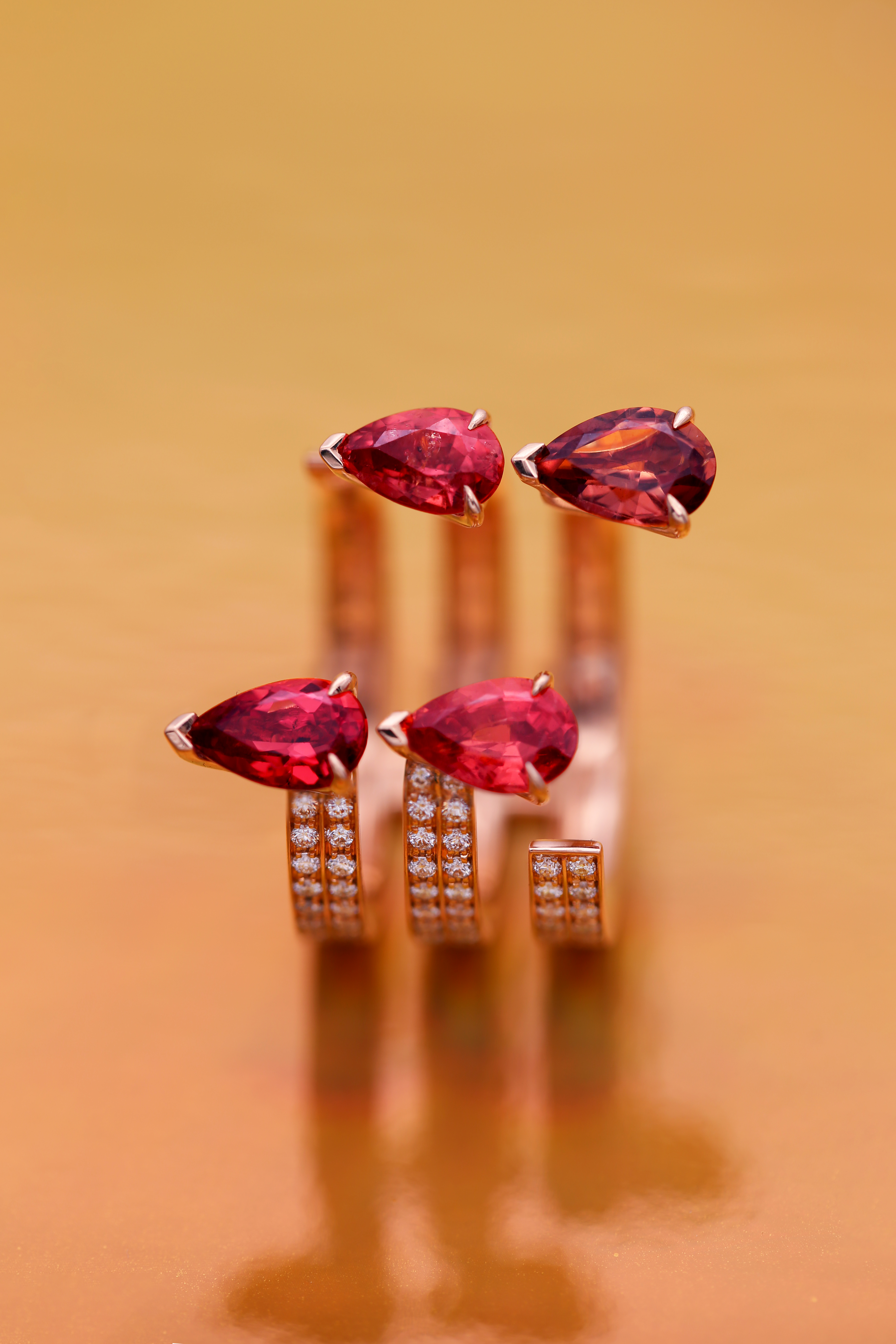
