= Albert II of Monaco =

Prince of Monaco since 2005

Albert II
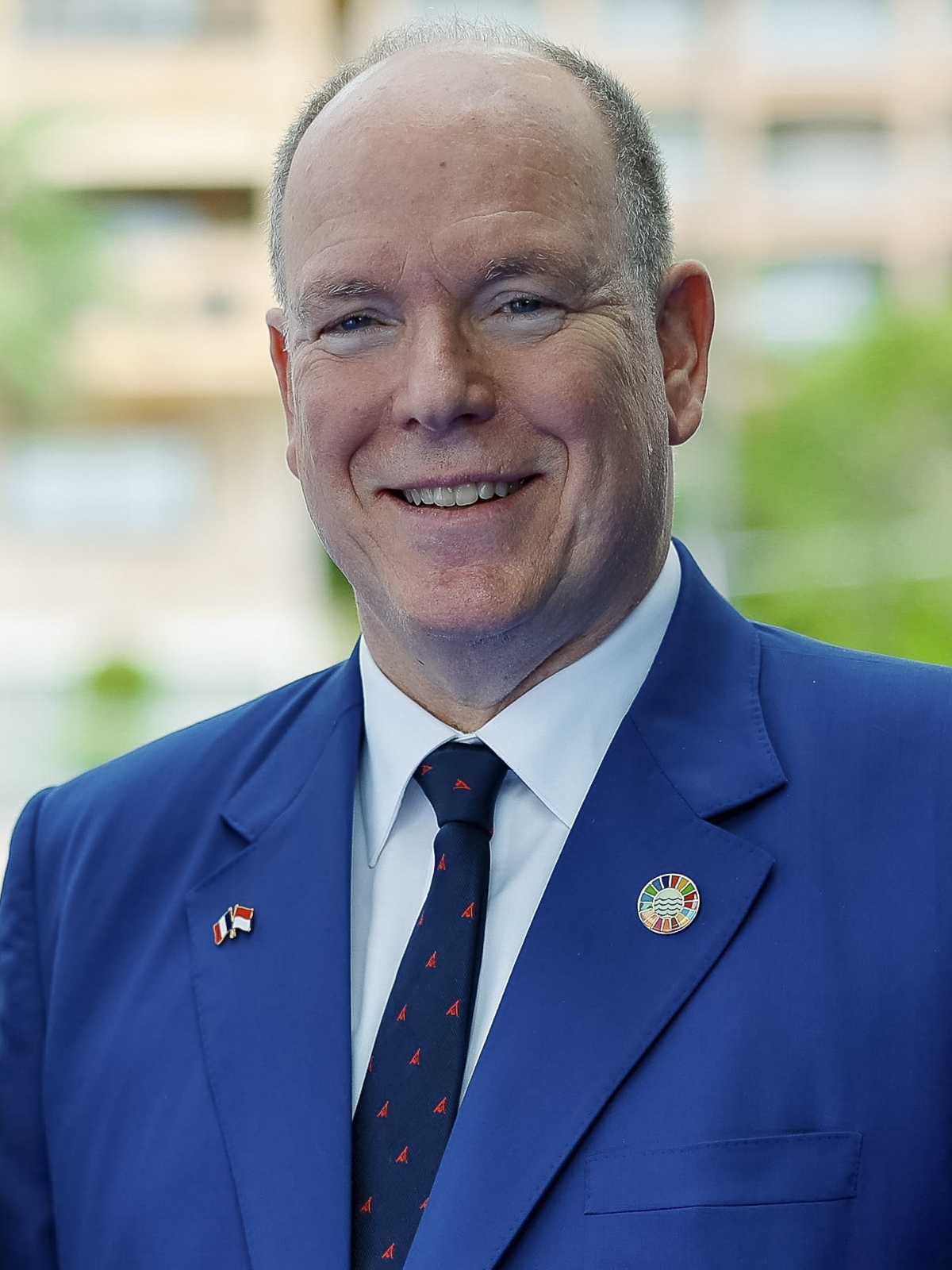
- Albert in 2025

Prince of Monaco
- Reign: 6 April 2005 – present
- Predecessor: Rainier III
- Heir apparent: Jacques

Regent of Monaco
- Tenure: 31 March 2005 – 6 April 2005
- Monarch: Rainier III
- Ministers of State: See list: Patrick Leclercq
- Born: 14 March 1958 (age 68); Prince's Palace of Monaco, Monaco
- Spouse: Charlene Wittstock (m. 2011)
- Issue: Jazmin Grace Grimaldi; Alexandre Grimaldi-Coste; Princess Gabriella, Countess of Carladès; Jacques, Hereditary Prince of Monaco
Names
- Albert Alexandre Louis Pierre Grimaldi
- House: Grimaldi
- Father: Rainier III, Prince of Monaco
- Mother: Grace Kelly
- Religion: Catholicism
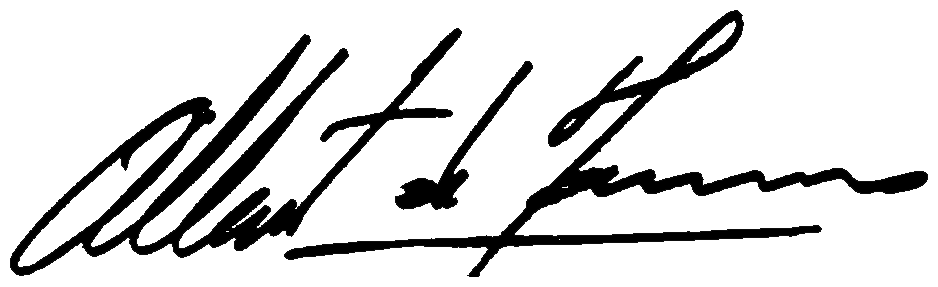
- Signature
- Military career
- Allegiance: Monaco
- Branch: Public Services
- Service years: 1986–2005 (end of active service)
- Rank: Commander-in-chief

Albert II (Albert Alexandre Louis Pierre Grimaldi; born 14 March 1958) is Prince of Monaco, reigning since 2005.

Born at the Prince's Palace of Monaco, Albert is the second child and only son of Prince Rainier III and Princess Grace. He attended the Lycée Albert Premier before studying political science at Amherst College. He is an Olympian, having competed in bobsleigh at multiple Winter Olympic Games from 1988 until his retirement in 2002. Albert was appointed regent in March 2005 after his father fell ill, and became sovereign prince upon his father's death a week later. Since his accession, he has been outspoken in the field of environmentalism and an advocate of ocean conservation and the adoption of renewable energy sources to address global climate change, and founded the Prince Albert II of Monaco Foundation in 2006 to raise funds and initiate action for such causes and broader ecological preservation.

With assets valued in 2010 at US$1 billion, Albert owns shares in the Société des Bains de Mer, which operates Monaco's casino and other entertainment properties in the Principality. In July 2011, Albert married South African Olympic swimmer Charlene Wittstock. He is the father of Gabriella and Jacques, the latter his heir presumptive. Prior to his marriage, he had a daughter and a son, Jazmin and Alexandre, both from different unions. Albert recognizes four children, although he has been the subject of multiple paternity claims.

== Early life ==
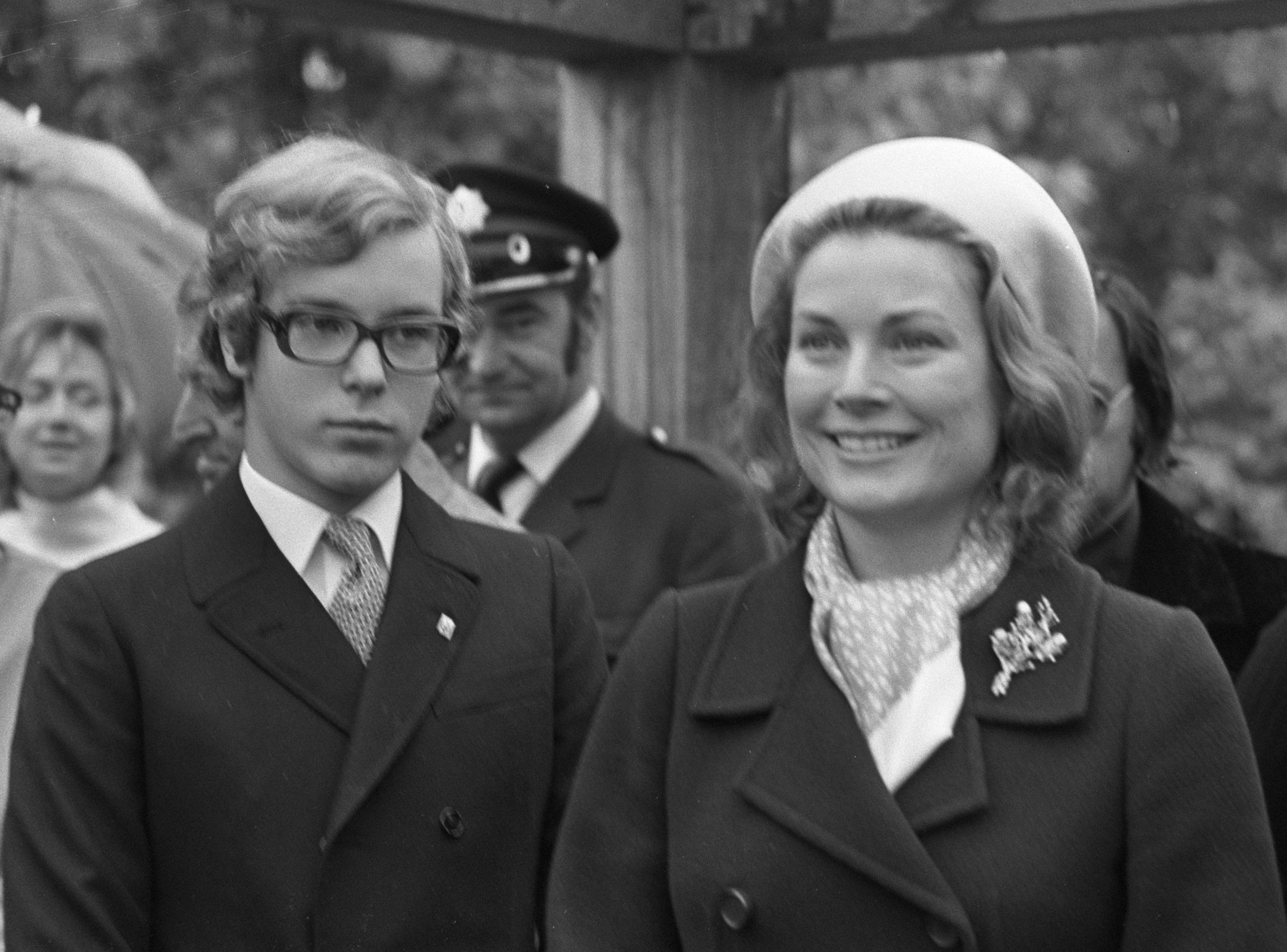
Albert with his mother, Princess Grace, at the Floriade garden exhibit in the Netherlands, 1972

Albert was born on 14 March 1958 in the Prince's Palace of Monaco, the second child of Prince Rainier III and Princess Grace. At the time of his birth, he was heir apparent to the throne. Albert was a dual citizen of both the Principality of Monaco and the United States of America by birth, before renouncing his American citizenship in early adulthood. He was baptized on 20 April 1958, by Monsignor Jean Delay, Archbishop of Marseille, in the Cathedral of the Immaculate Conception of Monaco. His godparents were Prince Louis de Polignac and Queen Victoria Eugenie of Spain.

== Hereditary Prince ==
=== Military service ===
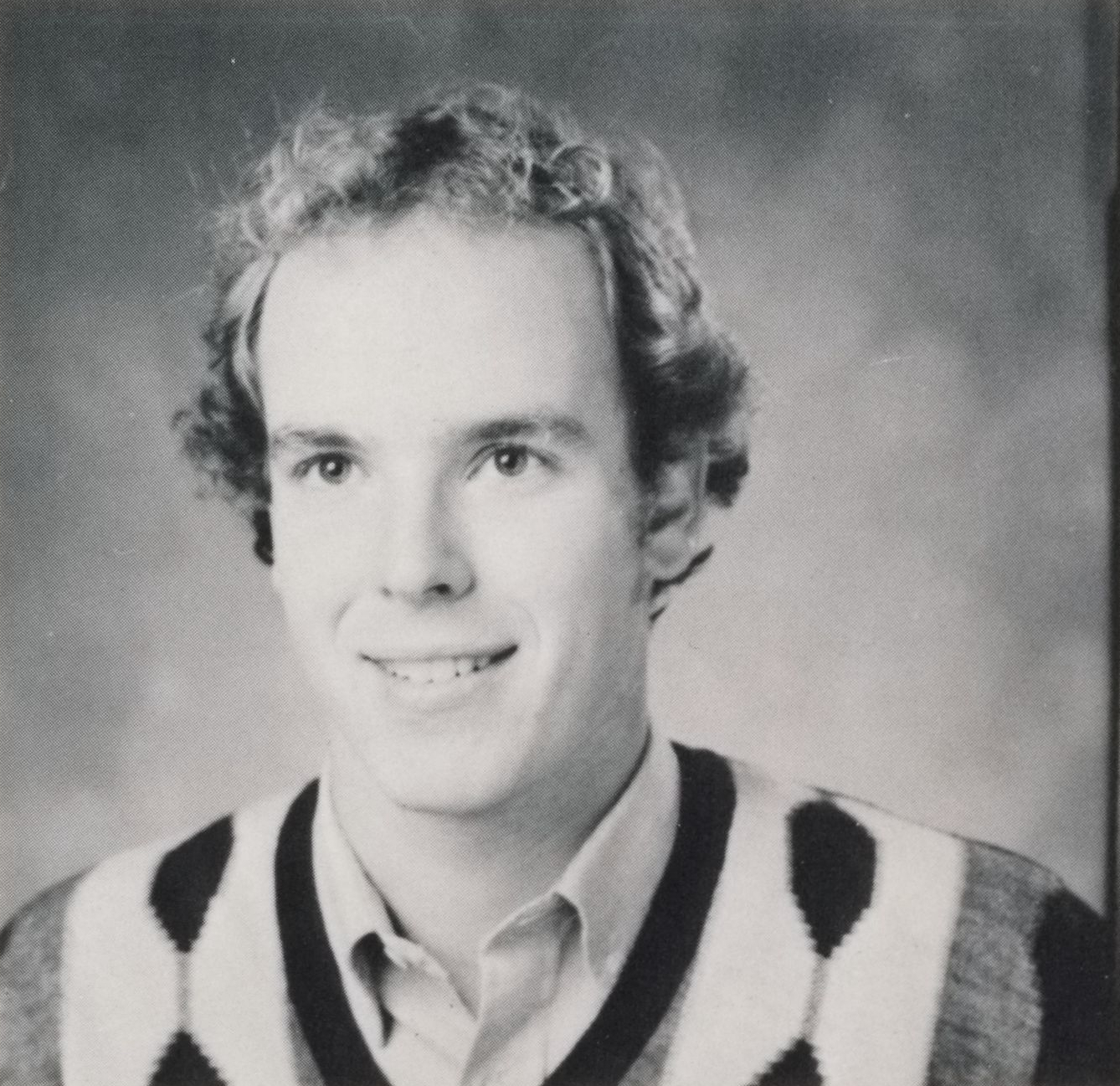
Albert in the Amherst College yearbook, 1981

Albert spent a year training in princely duties before enrolling at Amherst College in Massachusetts in 1977 as Albert Grimaldi. He joined Chi Psi fraternity and lived in the Alpha Chi Lodge. Albert spent mid-1979 touring Europe and the Middle East with the Amherst College Glee Club, and also undertook an exchange program with the University of Bristol at the Alfred Marshall School of Economics and Management in 1979. He graduated in 1981 with a Bachelor of Arts degree in political science. He speaks French, German, Italian, and English.

From September 1981 to April 1982, Albert trained on board the French Navy's helicopter cruiser Jeanne d'Arc , attaining the rank of Ship-of-the-Line Ensign (2nd class), and is currently a reserve Lieutenant Commander. From 1983 to 1985, he took training courses with companies J.P. Morgan & Co, Louis Vuitton, Rogers & Wells, and Wells, Rich and Greene in the United States and Europe, studying financial management, communication, and marketing. Since May 1993, he has led the Monegasque delegation to the General Assembly of the United Nations. In 2004, he presided over the delegation of Monaco in Strasbourg, France, for the Principality's official accession to the Council of Europe.

Albert's mother, Grace, died at age 52 as a result of injuries sustained in a car accident in 1982. In 2017, he stated in an interview that his mother's death was a traumatic event for him and his family, revealing that his father was "never the same man" after the loss.

=== Sports career ===
Albert was an enthusiastic sportsman, participating in cross-country, javelin throwing, handball, judo, swimming, tennis, rowing, sailing, skiing, squash, and fencing. He became a judo black belt in 1985.

Albert competed in bobsleigh at five consecutive Winter Olympic Games for Monaco, taking part in both the two-man and four-man events. In the two-man bobsleigh, Albert finished 25th at the 1988 games in Calgary, 43rd at the 1992 games in Albertville, and 31st at the 1994 games in Lillehammer. In the four-man bobsleigh, he finished 27th in 1992, 26th at the 1994 games in Lillehammer, and 28th at both the 1998 games in Nagano and the 2002 games in Salt Lake City. Albert was Monaco's flag bearer at the 1988, 1994, and 1998 Winter Olympics. He also took part in the 1985 Paris–Dakar Rally but did not complete it. Albert has been a member of the International Olympic Committee since 1985, and his maternal grandfather, John B. Kelly Sr., and maternal uncle, John B. Kelly Jr., were both Olympic medalists in rowing. In 2017, Albert gained OLY post-nominal status under his competition name of Albert Grimaldi.

On 31 March 2005, following consultation with the Crown Council of Monaco, the Palais Princier announced that Albert would take over his father's duties as regent since Rainier was no longer able to exercise his princely functions.

== Reign ==
=== Accession ===
The first part of Albert's enthronement as ruler of the Principality took place on 12 July 2005, after the end of the three-month mourning period for his father. A morning Mass at Saint Nicholas Cathedral, presided over by the archbishop of Monaco, the Most Reverend Bernard Barsi, formally marked the beginning of his reign. Afterward, Albert returned to the Palace to host a garden party for 7,000 Monégasques born in the Principality. In the courtyard, he was presented with two keys to the city as a symbol of his investiture, and subsequently gave a speech. The evening ended with a fireworks display on the waterfront.

The second part of his investiture took place on 19 November 2005. Albert was enthroned at Saint Nicholas Cathedral. The Princely family was in attendance, including his elder sister, Princess Caroline with her husband Ernst, Prince of Hanover and three of her four children, Andrea, Pierre and Charlotte; as well as his younger sister Princess Stéphanie, his paternal aunt Princess Antoinette, Baroness of Massy, his godson, Jean-Léonard Taubert de Massy, and his cousin Elisabeth-Anne de Massy. Royalty from 16 delegations were present for the festivities throughout the country. The evening ended with a dedicated performance at the Opéra de Monte-Carlo.

=== Succession issues ===
As Rainier III's health declined, Albert's lack of legitimate children became a matter of public and political concern owing to the legal and international consequences. Had Albert succeeded his father and died without lawful heirs, it would have triggered Article 3 of the 1918 Franco-Monegasque Treaty, according to which the Principality of Monaco would become a protectorate of the French Republic. Prior to 2002, Monaco's constitution stipulated that only the last reigning prince's "direct and legitimate" descendants could inherit the crown.

On 2 April 2002, Monaco promulgated Princely Law 1.249, which provides that if a reigning prince dies without surviving legitimate issue, the throne passes to his legitimate siblings and their legitimate descendants of both sexes, according to the principle of male-preference primogeniture.

Under the current constitution, neither Jazmin nor Alexandre is in the line of succession to the Monegasque throne, as they are not Albert's legitimate children, and he emphasized their ineligibility to inherit the throne in statements confirming his paternity. Monegasque law stipulates that any non-adulterine illegitimate child is legitimized by the eventual marriage of his/her parents, thereby obtaining the rights to which that child would have been entitled if born in lawful marriage. Thus Alexandre would have become Monaco's heir apparent under current law if Albert were to marry Alexandre's mother. In a 2005 exchange with American reporter Larry King, Albert stated that this would not happen.

Prior to the birth of Princess Gabriella and Prince Jacques, Albert's elder sister, Caroline, Princess of Hanover, was heir presumptive and, according to the Grimaldi house law, bore the traditional title of Hereditary Princess of Monaco. Following their births, she is now third in line.

=== Princely activities ===
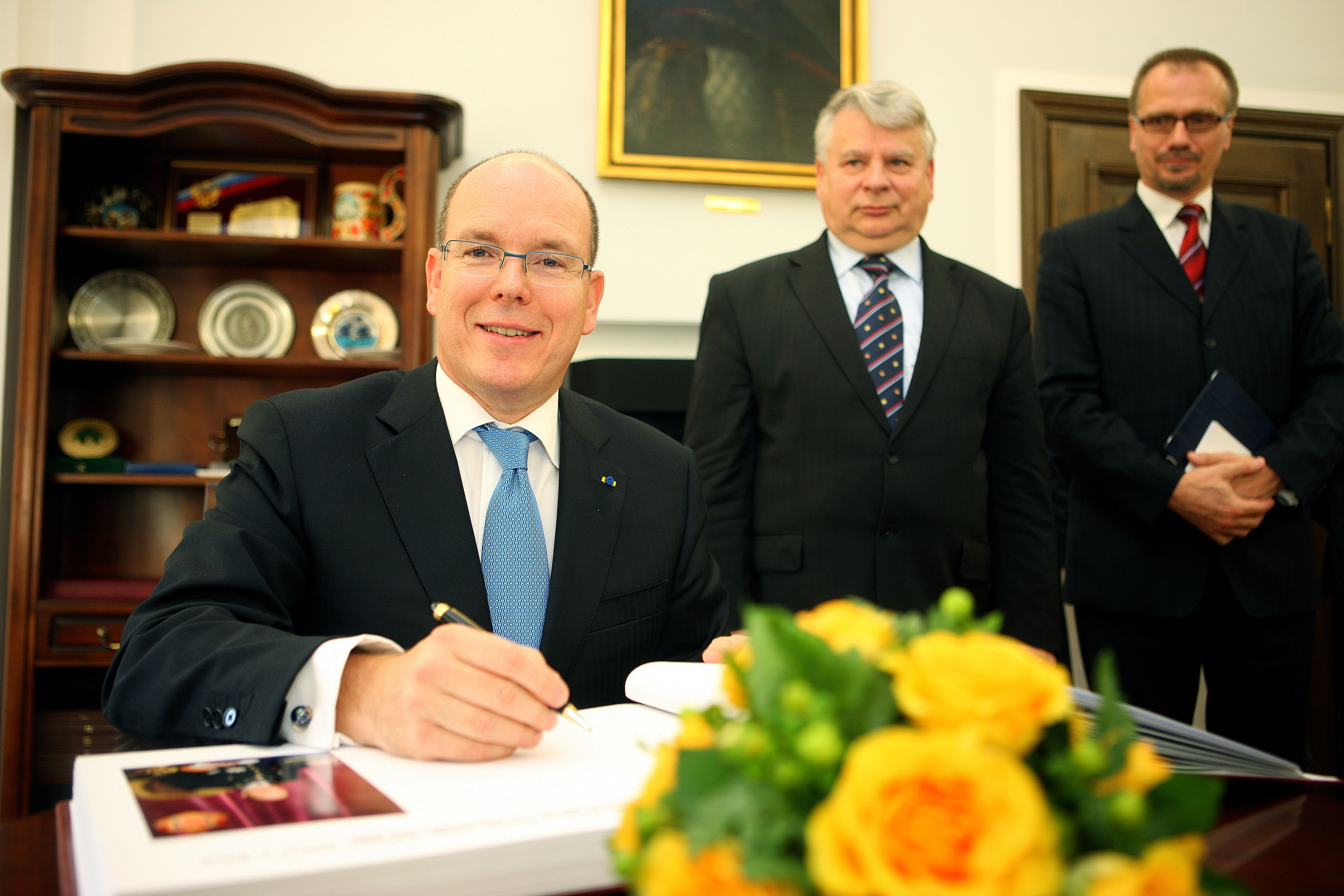
Albert visiting the Senate of Poland in 2012

In the early years of his reign, Albert oversaw multiple judicial and legal reforms, including the regulation of custody, protections of individual privacy in the face of technological growth, freedom of the press, legislative gender equality, and the protection of children's rights and disabled students. In July 2005, in echo of Albert I, his great-great-grandfather, he travelled to Spitsbergen, Norway. During this trip, he visited the glaciers Lilliehöökbreen and Monacobreen. Albert also engaged in a Russian Arctic expedition, reaching the North Pole on Easter, 16 April 2006.

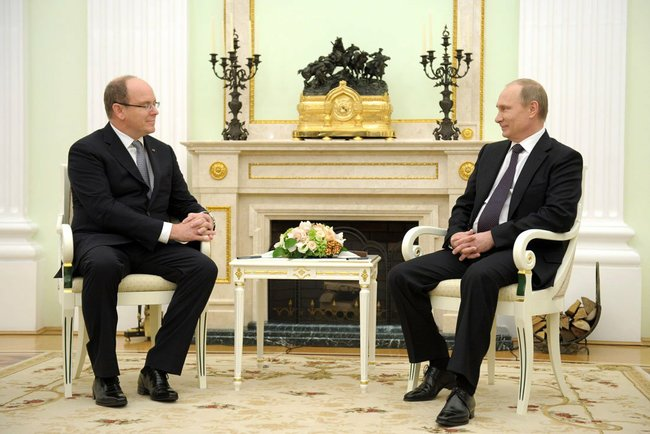
Albert with Russian President Vladimir Putin in October 2013

Since his ascension, Albert has overseen the construction of various community facilities, including social housing, railway infrastructure, educational institutes for the hospitality industry, and secondary education. He currently heads an initiative to promote ethical economic activity, criminal liability, systems to combat money laundering and organized crime, and the introduction of tax fraud into Monegasque criminal law. In 2006, Albert created the Prince Albert II of Monaco Foundation, which continues Monaco's commitment to supporting sustainable and ethical projects around the world. The foundation's focus has three main objectives: climate change and renewable energy development, combating the loss of biodiversity, and improving universal access to clean water.

On 27 August 2015, Albert apologized for Monaco's role in facilitating the deportation of a total of 90 Jews and resistance fighters to the Nazis in 1942, of whom only nine survived. "We committed the irreparable in handing over to the neighboring authorities women, men, and a child who had taken refuge with us to escape the persecutions they had suffered in France," Albert said at a ceremony in which a monument to the victims was unveiled at the Monaco Cemetery. "In distress, they came specifically to take shelter with us, thinking they would find neutrality."

Between 2006 and 2022, Albert's chief of cabinet was Georges Lisimachio. In June 2023, Albert dismissed Claude Palmero, the manager of the Prince of Monaco's assets who had served for over two decades. Albert said of the decision, "I exercised my right to choose the asset manager of my choice. Events have shown how much this decision was the right one." Palmero proceeded to sue Albert for €1 million and leaked information about the palace's spending to the French media.

== Personal life ==
In 2016, Albert purchased his mother's childhood home in East Falls, Philadelphia, which was originally built by her father Jack Kelly Sr. Upon acquiring it, he stated that the house might be used as a museum space or as offices for the Princess Grace Foundation. Albert does not have direct ownership of the Prince's Palace, but he does possess personal homes in both La Turbie and Marchais.

Albert, a well-known automotive enthusiast, owns vehicles such as the BMW Hydrogen 7, the Lexus LS 600h, the Lexus RX 400h, and the Toyota Prius PHV. He also owns a Dassault Aviation Falcon 7X, a 14-passenger leisure jet currently stationed at Nice Côte d'Azur Airport.

Albert was close friends with the artist Nall and owns some of his works.

On 19 March 2020, amid the COVID-19 pandemic in Europe, it was announced that Albert had tested positive for COVID-19, making him the first monarch and head of state to have contracted the virus. It was reported that he had begun to self-quarantine in his apartment, performing his work and duties from there. On 31 March, it was announced that he had made a full recovery. In April 2022, he tested positive for COVID-19 for the second time and observed a brief period of self-isolation.

In 2021, Albert became the first head of state to fly in an electric plane, flying on 14 September 2021, in a Pipistrel Velis128 operated by Elektropostal with pilot Raphaël Domjan from Nice Airport in France over Monaco. The plane flew for 30 minutes at a maximum altitude of 900 feet.

=== Paternity claims ===
- Tamara Jean Rotolo – Albert was reportedly listed as the father of Jazmin Grace Grimaldi on her birth certificate, registered in Riverside County, California, United States. The case went to trial in 1993 and was eventually dismissed by Superior Court Judge Graham Anderson Cribbs, who refused jurisdiction and found that there was "insufficient connection between [Prince Hereditary] Albert and the State of California to justify hearing a suit [in California]", supporting the statements of his lawyer. On 31 May 2006, after a DNA test confirmed the child's parentage, Albert admitted, via a statement from his lawyer, that he is Jazmin's father.
- Nicole Coste – In May 2005, a former Air France flight attendant from Togo claimed that her youngest son, born Éric Alexandre Stéphane Tossoukpé on 24 August 2003, in Paris, France, whom she called Alexandre Coste, was Albert's child, and stated that his parentage had been proven by DNA tests requested by the Monegasque government. She further declared that Albert had signed a notarized certificate confirming paternity, of which she had not received a copy. Paris Match published a ten-page interview with Coste, including photographs of Albert holding and feeding the child. Coste also told the publication that she was living in his Paris apartment and receiving an allowance from him, while pretending to be the girlfriend of one of his friends in order to maintain discretion. She also stated that Albert had last seen the boy in February 2005. His lawyer, Thierry Lacoste, announced that as a result of the international publicity over these revelations, Albert was suing the Daily Mail, Bunte, and Paris Match for privacy violations. On 6 July 2005, a few days before he was enthroned on 12 July, the Albert officially confirmed via his lawyer Lacoste that Alexandre was his biological son. He calls himself Alexandre Grimaldi.
- Bea Fiedler – In a suit filed around January 1989, a German model and former adult film actress claimed her son Daniel was Albert's child from an October 1986 tryst. A judge reportedly dismissed the suit, despite the fact that Albert had submitted a DNA sample to be tested, as the genetic sample had not been rendered in front of a witness. Fiedler rejected the DNA blood sample as truly belonging to him.
- In December 2020, a Brazilian woman filed a paternity suit against Albert, claiming that he had fathered a child with her during his relationship with Charlene. Albert's lawyer described the claim as a 'hoax'.

=== Marriage ===
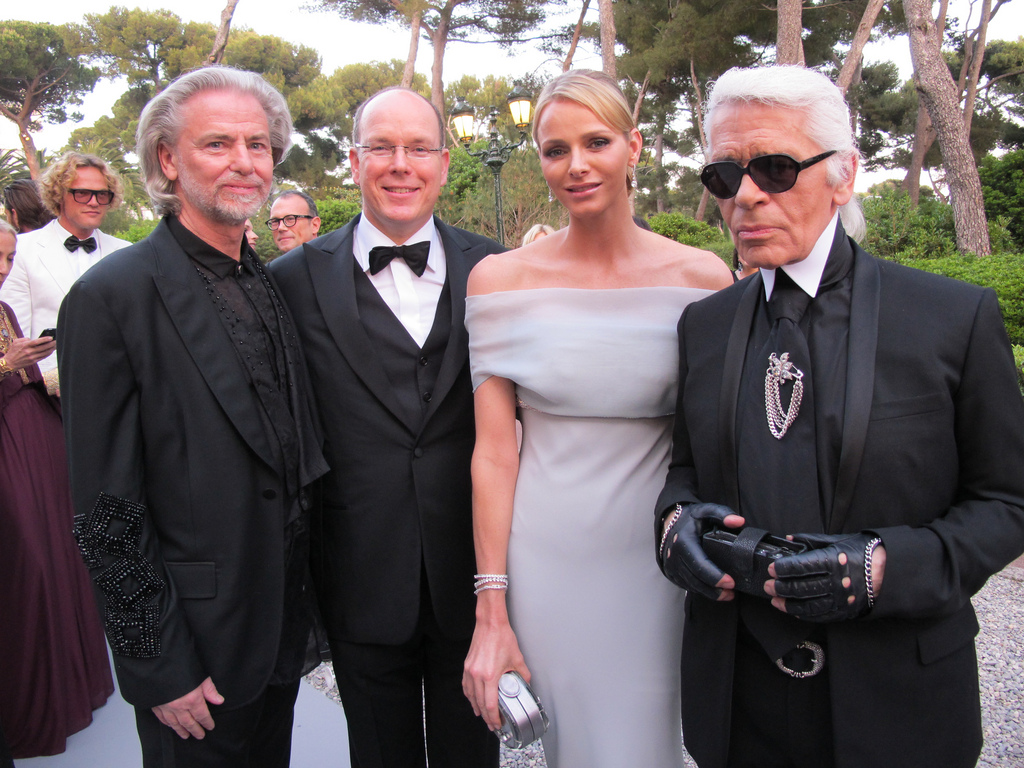
Albert and Wittstock at the "Cinema Against AIDS" Gala with Karl Lagerfeld

Albert met South African swimmer Charlene Wittstock in 2000 at the Mare Nostrum swimming meet in Monaco. They made their public debut as a couple at the opening ceremony of the 2006 Winter Olympics.

Their engagement was announced by the palace on 10 June 2010. The wedding was originally scheduled for 8 and 9 July 2011, but was moved forward to prevent a conflict with the International Olympic Committee (IOC) meeting in Durban on 5–9 July, which they both attended. The couple invited members of the IOC, including president Jacques Rogge, to their wedding.

The couple were married in a civil ceremony on 1 July 2011 in the Throne Room of the Prince's Palace. The religious ceremony took place in the courtyard of the palace on 2 July and was presided over by Archbishop Bernard Barsi. The couple honeymooned in South Africa, where they stayed in separate hotels, and Mozambique.

Albert and Charlene had twins, Princess Gabriella, Countess of Carladès, and Jacques, Hereditary Prince of Monaco, on 10 December 2014. Jacques is the heir apparent to the throne.

== Charity work and patronages ==
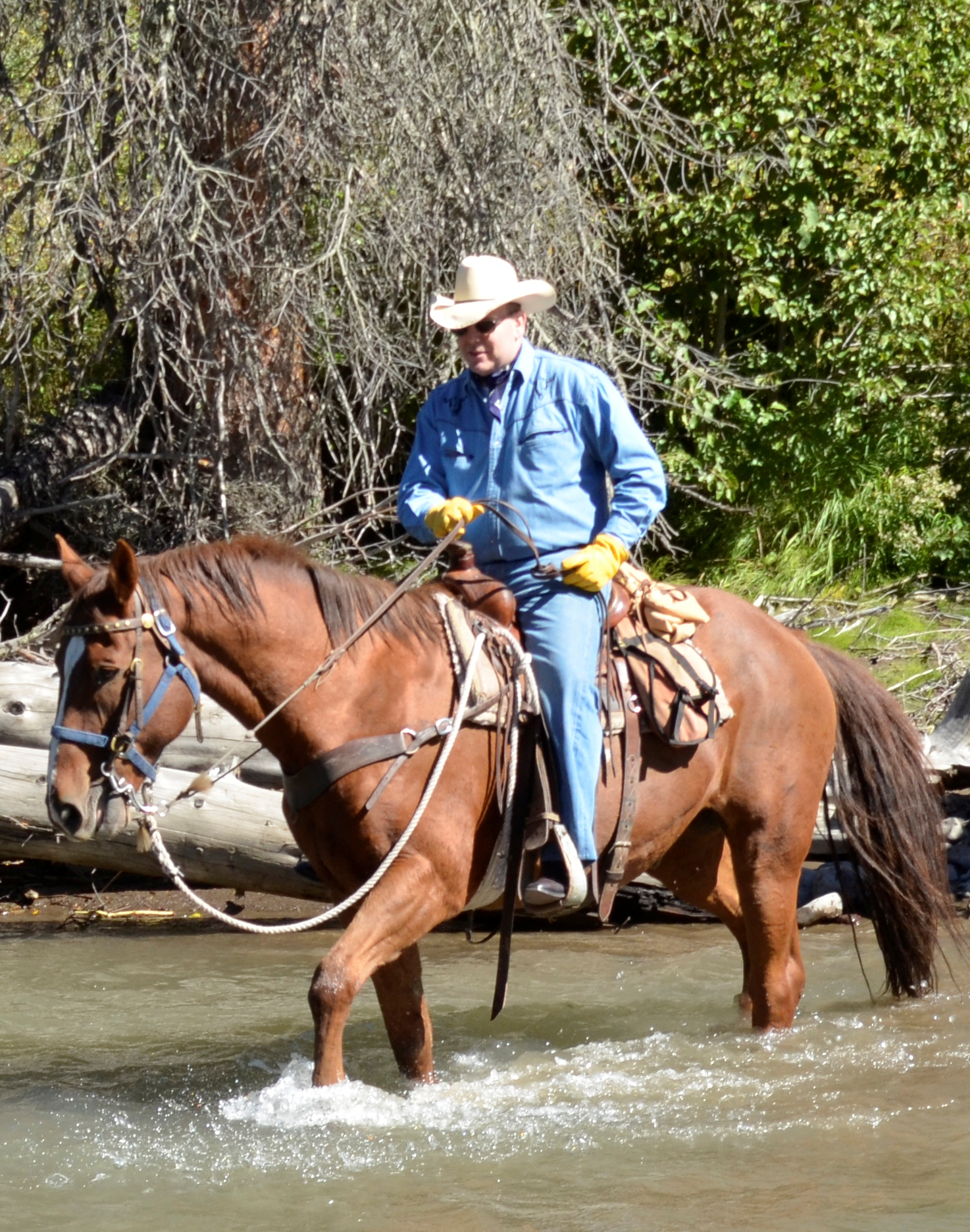
Albert rides through a river on a guided tour in the Shoshone National Forest, September 2013

Albert holds patronages with AS Monaco, the World Olympians Association, the Monte-Carlo Rolex Masters, the Peace and Sport Organization, the No Finish Line International charitable non-profit Organisation, and Junior Chamber International. He holds official and honorary presidencies within the Monaco Red Cross, Comité Olympique Monégasque, Association Mondiale des Amis de l'Enfance, the Automobile Club de Monaco, the Festival de Télévision de Monte-Carlo, and Jumping International de Monte Carlo. Albert is affiliated with International Paralympic Committee, Junior Chamber International, and Art of the Olympians. Albert is also a global adviser to Orphans International.

=== Environmental interests ===
In 2001, at the 36th Congress of the Mediterranean Science Commission held in the Principality, the CIESM Member States unanimously elected Monaco, represented by Albert, to the presidency of the commission.

The year 2007 was declared as (International) Year of the Dolphin by the United Nations and United Nations Environment Programme. Albert served as the International Patron of the "Year of the Dolphin", saying, "The Year of the Dolphin gives me the opportunity to renew my firm commitment towards protecting marine biodiversity. With this strong initiative we can make a difference to save these fascinating marine mammals from the brink of extinction."

The Zoological Garden of Monaco (Jardin Animalier) was founded by Prince Rainier in 1954. Rainier was petitioned unsuccessfully for many years by Virginia McKenna, founder of the Born Free Foundation, to release a pair of leopards at the zoo. He intends to convert the Jardin into a zoo for children.

In January 2009, Albert left for a month-long expedition to Antarctica, where he visited 26 scientific outposts and met with climate-change experts in an effort to learn more about the impact of global warming on the continent. During the trip, he stopped at the South Pole, making him the only incumbent head of state to have visited both poles.

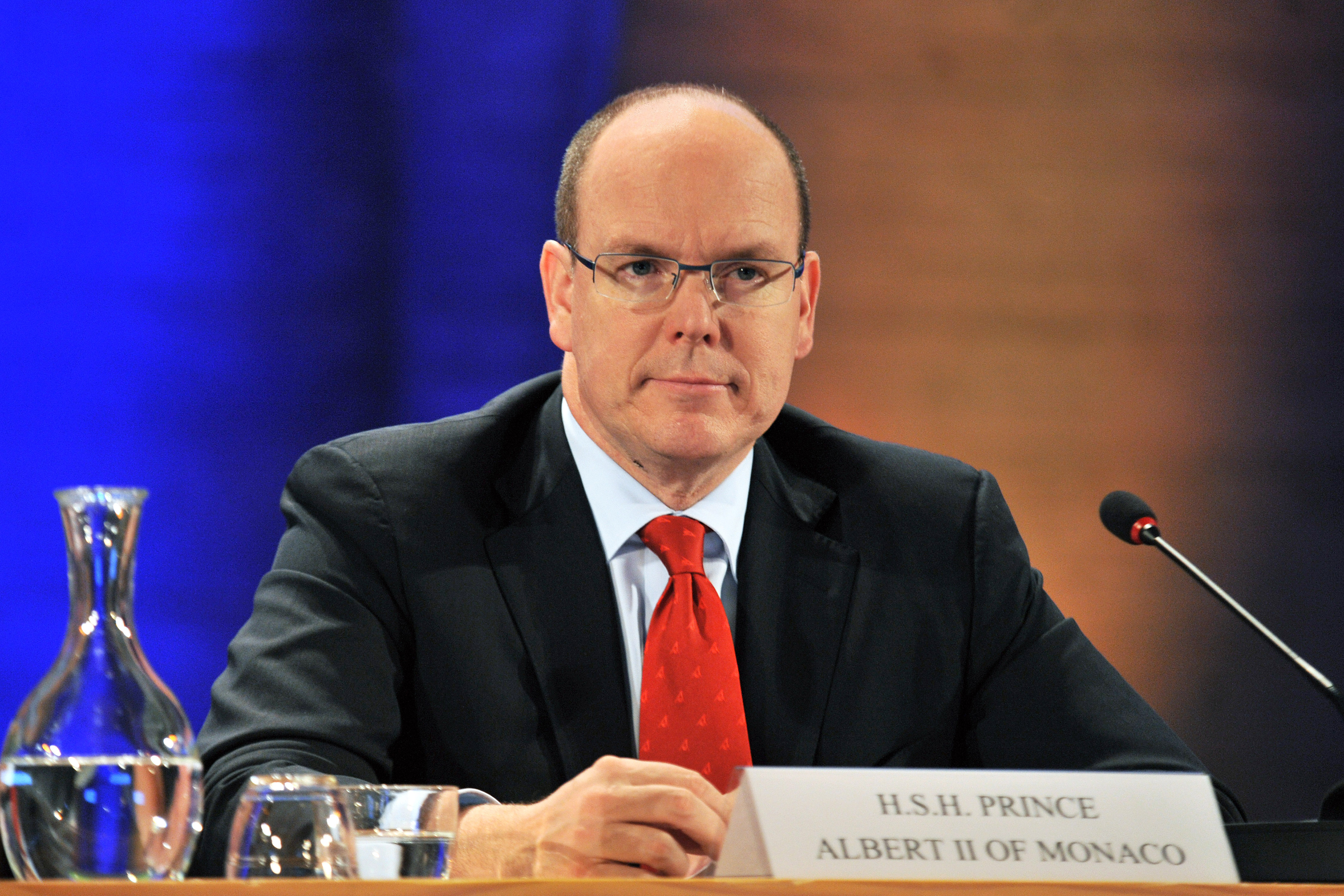
Albert at the 5th Global Conference on Oceans, Coasts and Islands at UNESCO Paris, 2010

In June 2009, Albert co-authored an op-ed published in The Wall Street Journal with Charles Clover, author of The End of the Line, a book about overfishing and ocean conservation issues that had recently been made into a documentary by Rupert Murray. In the piece, Albert and Clover note that bluefin tuna have been severely overfished in the Mediterranean and decry the common European Union practice of awarding inflated quotas to bluefin fleets. Albert also announced that Monaco would seek to award endangered species status to the Mediterranean bluefin, Thunnus thynnus, (also called the Northern bluefin), under the Convention on International Trade in Endangered Species (CITES). This was the first time a nation had called for the inclusion of Mediterranean bluefin under CITES since Sweden at the 1992 CITES Conference, which was vehemently opposed by Japan, who eventually threatened retaliation through trade barriers.

On 16 July 2009, France declared that it too would seek to have Mediterranean bluefin listed as an endangered species. Only hours later, the United Kingdom followed suit.

On 19 September 2017, Albert expressed his strong interest for the preliminary draft of the Global Pact for the Environment presented by French President Emmanuel Macron during the 72nd session of the United Nations General Assembly. He added that he would be attentive to the future of this Pact, which he described as "universal, legally binding agreement, which recognises the right of future generations to sustainable development."

After meeting Torres Strait Islander artist and activist Alick Tipoti in 2016, Albert went to stay with his family on Badu Island and collaborated with him on the film Alick and Albert (2021), a feature-length documentary film about the future of the oceans and how climate change affects people in the Torres Strait Islands as well as Monaco. The film had its world premiere at the Brisbane International Film Festival in October 2021.

On 12 February 2020, Albert and Victor Vescovo reached the bottom of Calypso Deep, a depth of 16,762 ft, in a submarine. They were only the second team to do so after a French group in 1965.

== Publications ==
- Albert II, le Prince de Monaco. L'Homme et l'Océan. Éditions Flammarion. 16 June 2022. 104p. ISBN 9782361323233.
- Grimaldi, Albert. "Governance of both Poles." Science 326, no. 5956 (2009): 1042-1042.

=== Prefaces, forewords ===
- Michaud, Claude. "Thomas Fouilleron, Des princes en Europe. Les Grimaldi de Monaco des Lumières au printemps des peuples." Préface de SAS le Prince Albert II de Monaco. Avant-propos de Pierre-Yves Beaurepaire. Paris, Honoré Champion, 2012, 975 p.(coll.«Les Dix-huitièmes siècles», 145)." Dix-huitième siècle 45, no. 1 (2013): LXXXVI-LXXXVI.

== Titles, styles, honours, and arms ==
Styles of Albert II
- Reference style: His Serene Highness
- Spoken style: Your Serene Highness

=== Titles and styles ===
- 14 March 1958 – 16 March 1958: His Serene Highness Albert, Hereditary Prince of Monaco
- 16 March 1958 – 6 April 2005: His Serene Highness Albert, Hereditary Prince of Monaco, Marquis of Baux
- 31 March – 6 April 2005: His Serene Highness Albert, Prince Regent of Monaco
- 6 April 2005 – present: His Serene Highness Albert II, Prince of Monaco

=== Military appointments ===
- Monaco: Colonel of the Compagnie des Carabiniers du Prince (11 November 1986 – 6 April 2005)
- France: Capitaine de frégate de la Marine Nationale (2 April 1992 – present)

=== Honours ===
==== National orders ====
- Monaco:
  - Grand Master of the Order of Saint-Charles (since 6 April 2005; Knight Grand Cross, 1979 – 2005)
  - Grand Master of the Order of the Crown (since 6 April 2005)
  - Grand Master of the Order of Grimaldi (since 6 April 2005; Knight Grand Cross, 1958 – 2005)
  - Grand Master of the Order of Cultural Merit (since 6 April 2005)

==== Foreign orders ====
- Albania: Recipient of the National Flag Order (16 October 2018)
- Bulgaria: Grand Cross of the Order of The Balkan Mountains (26 November 2004)
- Burkina Faso: Grand Officer of the Order of Burkina Faso (17 February 2012)
- Costa Rica: Grand Cross Gold Plaque of the Order Juan Mora Fernández (2003)
- Croatia: Grand Cross of the Grand Order of King Tomislav (7 April 2009)
- El Salvador: Grand Cross of the Order of the Liberator of the Slaves José Simeón Cañas (2002)
- France:
  - Grand Cross of the Order of Legion of Honour (8 November 2005)
  - Grand Cross of the National Order of Merit (25 July 1997)
  - Commander of the Order of Academic Palms (19 June 2009)
  - Commander of the Order of Maritime Merit (9 December 2015)
  - Commander of the Order of Agricultural Merit (14 May 2024)
  - Medal of Honor for Commercial and Fishing Sailors (19 October 2022)
  - Great Gold Medal of the Society for the Encouragement of Progress [SEP] (7 October 2024)
- Germany: Grand Cross special class of the Order of Merit of the Federal Republic of Germany (9 July 2012)
- Holy See: Knight of the Collar of the Order of the Holy Sepulchre (per 4 October 2021; Knight Grand Cross, 27 January 1983)
- Italy: Knight Grand Cross with Collar of the Order of Merit of the Italian Republic (12 December 2005)
- Jordan: Grand Cordon of the Supreme Order of the Renaissance (before 07/2011)
- Lebanon: Member Extraordinary Class of the Order of Merit (before 07/2011)
- Lithuania: Grand Cross of the Order of Vytautas the Great (15 October 2012)
- Malaysia:
  - Recipient of the Order of the Crown of the Realm (27 November 2023)
  - Member 1st Class of the Family Order of the Crown of Indra of Pahang (DK) (7 November 1997 & 27 November 2023)
- Mali: Grand Cross of the National Order of Mali (12 February 2012)
- Netherlands: Recipient of the King Willem-Alexander Inauguration Medal
- Niger: Grand Cross of the Order of Niger (March 1998)
- Panama: Grand Cross of the Order of Vasco Núñez de Balboa (2002)
- Paraguay: Collar of the National Order of Merit (4 November 2025)
- Peru: Grand Cross of the Order of the Sun (2003)
- Poland: Grand Cross of the Order of Merit of the Republic of Poland (2012)
- Portugal:
  - Grand Collar of the Order of Prince Henry (14 October 2022)
  - Grand Collar of the Military Order of Our Lord Jesus Christ (21 November 2025)
- Romania: Collar of the Order of the Star of Romania (2009)
- San Marino:
  - Collar of the Order of San Marino (2015)
  - Grand Cross of the Order of Saint Agatha (2010)
- Senegal: Grand Cross of the Order of the Lion (per 2012; Grand Officer, May 1977)
- Serbia: Grand Cross of Order of the Republic of Serbia (7 October 2020)
- Slovakia: Grand Cross of the Order of the White Double Cross (2017)
- Slovenia: Order for Exceptional Merits (2006)
- Sovereign Military Order of Malta:
  - Bailiff Knight Grand Cross of Honour and Devotion of the Order of Saint John of Jerusalem (per 31 July 2011; Knight Grand Cross, 15 October 1997)
  - Collar of the Order pro merito Melitensi (15 October 2009)
- Tunisia: Grand Cordon of the Order of 7 November (September 2006)
- Sweden:
  - Recipient of the 70th Birthday Badge Medal of King Carl XVI Gustaf (30 April 2016)
  - Recipient of the 50th Birthday Medal of King Carl XVI Gustaf (30 April 1996)

===== Dynastic orders =====
- House of Savoy:
  - Knight of the Supreme Order of the Most Holy Annunciation (27 April 2023)
  - Knight Grand Cross of the Order of Saints Maurice and Lazarus (1 March 2003)
- (Kingdom of Montenegro) House of Petrović-Njegoš: Knight Grand Cross of the Order of Prince Danilo I
- (Kingdom of the Two Sicilies) House of Bourbon-Two Sicilies (Franco-Neapolitan branch):
  - Knight of the Order of Saint Januarius (6 November 2017)
  - Bailiff Knight Grand Cross with Collar of Justice of the Sacred Military Constantinian Order of Saint George (6 November 2017)

==== Other awards ====
- FIODS: Medal of the International Merit of Blood (12 March 1994)
- France: Grand Prix Humanitaire de France (6 March 2007)
- England University of Plymouth: Doctor of Science (D.Sc.) (26 September 2013)
- Zayed International Prize for the Environment (1 February 2014)
- Pierre and Marie Curie University: Doctor Honoris Causa (23 March 2017)
- Israel Tel Aviv University: Doctor Honoris Causa (12 June 2018)
- Finland University of Lapland: Doctor Honoris Causa (19 February 2019)
- Italy Metropolitan City of Genoa: Paganini Ambassador (26 June 2023)

In 1996, Prince Albert received the Eagle Award from the United States Sports Academy. The Eagle Award is the academy's highest international honor and was awarded to Prince Albert for his significant contributions in promoting international harmony, peace and goodwill through the effective use of sport.

On 23 October 2009, Prince Albert was awarded the Roger Revelle Prize for his efforts to protect the environment and to promote scientific research. This award was given to Prince Albert by the Scripps Institution of Oceanography in La Jolla, California. Prince Albert is the second recipient of this prize.

In October 2017, Prince Albert received the Lowell Thomas Award from The Explorers Club, a non-profit group that promotes scientific exploration. The award is presented by the president of the club on special occasions to groups of outstanding explorers. The Club cited Prince Albert's dedication to the protection of the environment, commemorating his status as the first head of state to reach both the North and South poles.

On 14 October 2019 at the Comenius University in Bratislava, he received the honorary title "doctor honoris causa" for activities in the field of protection of natural and cultural heritage within his efforts to combat climate change.

==== Commemorative coins ====
As Monaco's head of state, Prince Albert II is depicted on both standard-issue and collector's coins, such as the €5 silver Prince Albert II commemorative coin, the first commemorative coin with his effigy, minted in 2008. On the obverse, the prince is depicted in profile with his name on the top of the coin. On the reverse, the Grimaldi coat of arms appears; around it, the words "Principauté de Monaco" (Principality of Monaco) also appear along with the nominal monetary value of the coin.

== Arms and emblems ==
| Coat of arms of Prince Albert II of Monaco | Monogram of Prince Albert II | Dual cypher of Prince Albert and Princess Charlene |

== See also ==
- Legion of Honour
- List of royal Olympians

Albert II of Monaco House of Grimaldi Born: 14 March 1958
Regnal titles
| Preceded by Rainier III | Prince of Monaco; 2005–present | Incumbent; Heir apparent: Jacques |
Monegasque royalty
| Preceded by Caroline | Hereditary Prince of Monaco; 1958–2005 | Succeeded by Caroline |
| Preceded by Rainier III | Duke of Valentinois¹ (de facto); 2005–present | Incumbent |
| Preceded by Rainier III | Marquis of Baux; 1958–2014 | Succeeded by Jacques |
Olympic Games
| Preceded by David Lajoux | Flagbearer for Monaco; 1988, 1992, 1994 | Succeeded by Gilbert Bessi |
Notes and references
1. Title extinct in 1949.
