= Monarchy of Monaco =

Sovereign Prince of Monaco
- Prince souverain de Monaco
- Arms of His Serene Highness the Sovereign Prince of Monaco

Incumbent
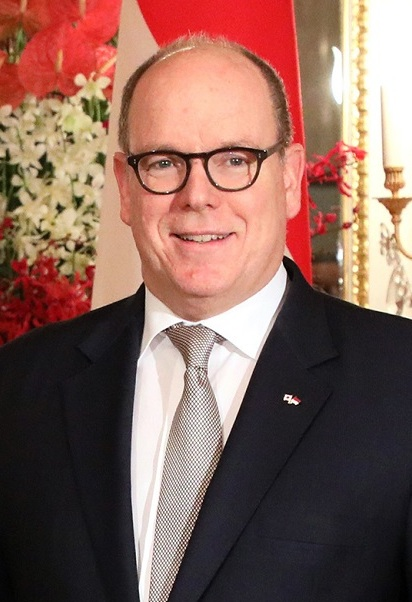
- Albert II since 6 April 2005

Details
- Style: His Serene Highness
- Heir apparent: Jacques
- First monarch: Honoré II (Note: As prince; previous rulers were called lords until 1612.)
- Formed: 29 November 1604; 421 years ago
- Residence: Prince's Palace
- Website: Monarchy of Monaco

The sovereign prince of Monaco (French: prince de Monaco; Monégasque: príncipe de Mónaco) is the monarch and head of state of the Principality of Monaco. All reigning princes and princesses have taken the name of the House of Grimaldi. When Prince Rainier III died in 2005, he was Europe's longest reigning monarch. The Grimaldi family, which has ruled Monaco for eight centuries, is Europe's longest-ruling royal family.

The reigning prince is Albert II, who ascended in April 2005.

== Powers of the prince ==
Monaco, along with Liechtenstein and Vatican City, is one of only three states in Western Europe where the monarch still plays an active role in day-to-day politics.

The Prince of Monaco exercises his authority in accordance with the Constitution and laws. He represents the principality in foreign relations, and any revision, either total or partial, of the Constitution must be jointly agreed to by the monarch and the National Council.

Legislative power is divided between the Prince who initiates the laws, and the National Council which votes on them. Executive power is retained by the monarch, who has veto power over all legislation proposed by the National Council.

The minister of state and the Government Council are directly responsible to the Prince for the administration of the principality.

Judiciary powers also belong to the monarch. The present Constitution states that the prince has full authority in the courts and tribunals which render justice in their name.

Pursuant to Article 16 of the 1962 Constitution, the Prince confers orders, titles and other distinctions (see Awards and decorations of Monaco) as the fons honorum of the Principality of Monaco.

In 2005, The New York Times reported that loyalty to the princely family is fierce; few residents of Monaco want to be quoted saying anything negative about the monarchy.

== Compensation ==
The princely family receives an annual allocation from the budget of Monaco, which was €43.5 million in 2015.

== Titles and styles ==
The Prince is styled His Serene Highness. Although used only formally, the Prince also bears several other hereditary titles, some of which are occasionally bestowed on his relatives or their spouses. Some of these titles have merged with the Crown of Monaco as a result of the Grimaldi family's acquisition of various fiefs; they no longer imply ownership or territorial authority, although the princes of Monaco have long been substantial owners of land and chateaux in France. Most were granted or recognised by the Kingdom of France or the Papal States and could only pass through the male line; they therefore became extinct as French dignities on the death of Albert's great-grandfather Prince Louis II in 1949. Thereafter, some of these titles were implicitly re-created as distinctly Monegasque titles.

The Prince's complete titles and styles are, in precedent order of rank:

- Sovereign Prince of Monaco (Title now used by Albert II)
- Hereditary Prince of Monaco (Title now used by Jacques)
- Prince of Château-Porcien
- Duke of Valentinois
- Duke of Estouteville
- Duke of Mazarin
- Duke of Mayenne
- Marquis of Baux (Title now used by Jacques)
- Marquis of Chilly-Mazarin
- Marquis of Guiscard
- Marquis of Bailli
- Count of Polignac (Title now used by Princess Stéphanie)
- Count of Carladès (Title now used by Princess Gabriella)
- Count of Ferrette
- Count of Belfort
- Count of Thann
- Count of Rosemont
- Count of Torigni
- Count of Longjumeau
- Count of Clèdes
- Baron of Calvinet
- Baron of Buis
- Baron of La Luthumière
- Baron of Hambye
- Baron of Altkirch
- Baron of Saint-Lô
- Baron of Massy (Title now used by Christian Louis de Massy, son of Princess Antoinette)
- Seigneur (Lord) of Issenheim
- Seigneur (Lord) of Saint-Rémy
- Sire of Matignon

All palace correspondence features capitalized pronouns when referring to the prince.

The tradition of the monarchy of Monaco was that the flag flying from the staff on the tower above his office be hoisted when the prince was present in Monaco. The current prince flies the flag whether he is present or not, preferring to keep his location private.

Monaco is officially protected by France, according to terms set forth in the Treaty of Versailles in 1919.

== See also ==
- List of rulers of Monaco
- List of Monégasque consorts
- Hereditary Prince of Monaco
- Succession to the Monegasque throne
