= Outline of Monaco =

Overview of and topical guide to Monaco

The following outline is provided as an overview of and topical guide to Monaco:

The Flag of Monaco

The Coat of arms of Monaco

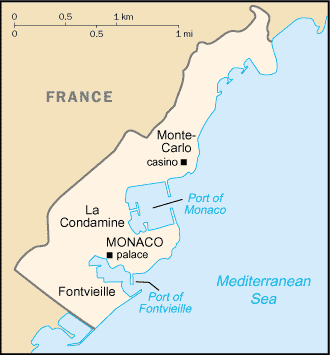
An enlargeable basic map of Monaco

Monaco – small sovereign city-state located in Western Europe. Monaco lies on the northern coast of the Mediterranean and is surrounded by France. It has the highest life expectancy at birth of any country, 89.4 years (2017 estimate). Monaco is often regarded as a tax haven, and many of its inhabitants are wealthy and from foreign countries (including France), although they are not a majority.

== General reference ==
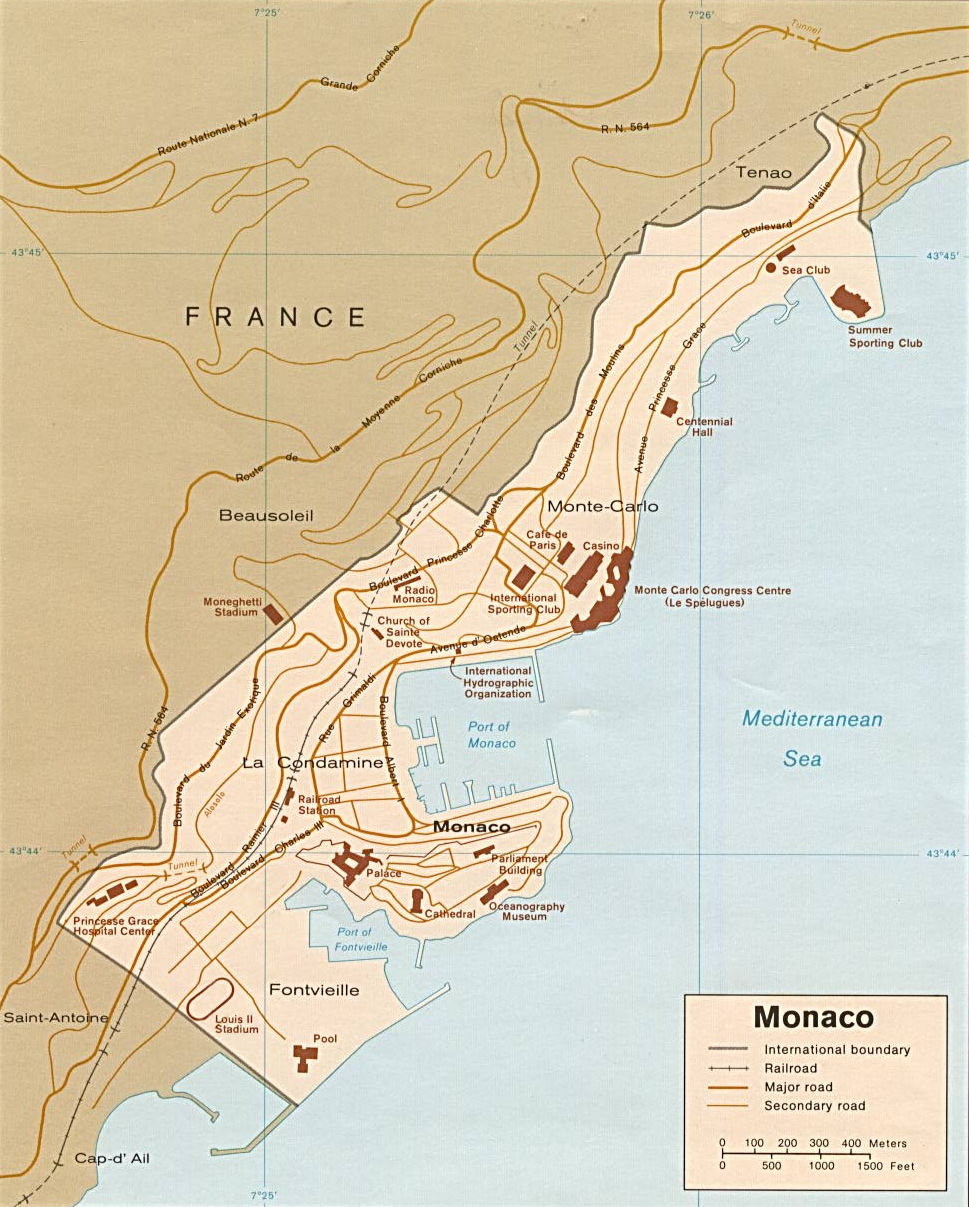
An enlargeable map of the Principality of Monaco (slightly outdated)

- Pronunciation: /ˈmɒnəkoʊ/
- Common English country name: Monaco
- Official English country name: The Principality of Monaco
- Adjectives: Monégasque, Monacan
- Demonym(s):
- Etymology: Name of Monaco
- ISO country codes: MC, MCO, 492
- ISO region codes: ISO 3166-2:MC
- Internet country code top-level domain: .mc

== Geography of Monaco ==
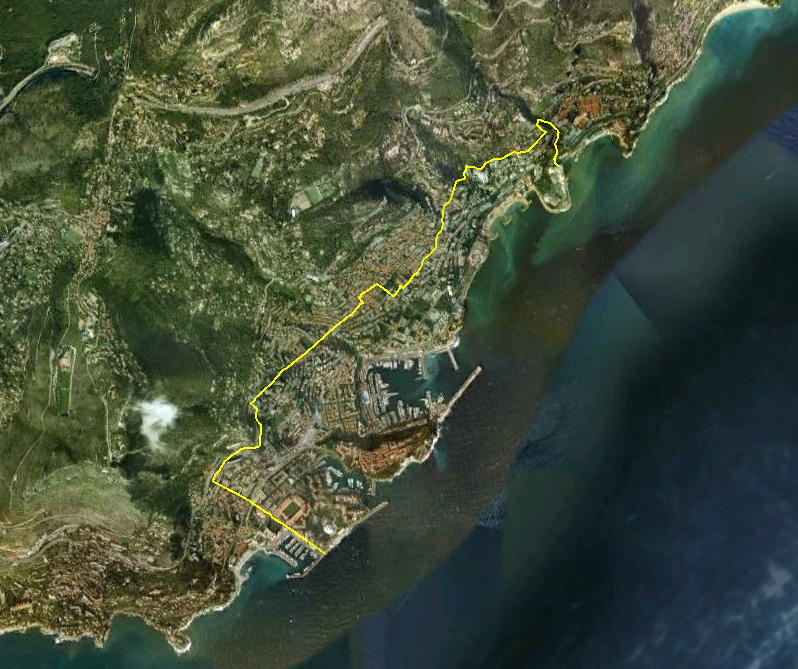
Satellite view with border

Geography of Monaco

- Monaco is: a country and a European microstate
- Land boundaries: France 4.4 km
- Coastline: Mediterranean Sea 4.1 km
- Population of Monaco: 33,000 - 205th most populous country
- Area of Monaco: 2.02 km^{2}
- Atlas of Monaco

=== Location of Monaco ===
The location of Monaco

- Monaco is situated within the following regions:
  - Northern Hemisphere and Eastern Hemisphere
  - Eurasia
    - Europe
      - Western Europe
      - Southern Europe
  - Time zone: Central European Time (UTC+01), Central European Summer Time (UTC+02)
- Extreme points of Monaco
  - High: Chemin des Rivoires, a pathway located on the slopes of Mont Agel 161 m (528 ft)
  - Low: Mediterranean Sea 0 m

=== Environment of Monaco ===
- Climate of Monaco
- Wildlife of Monaco
  - Fauna of Monaco
    - Mammals of Monaco
    - Birds of Monaco

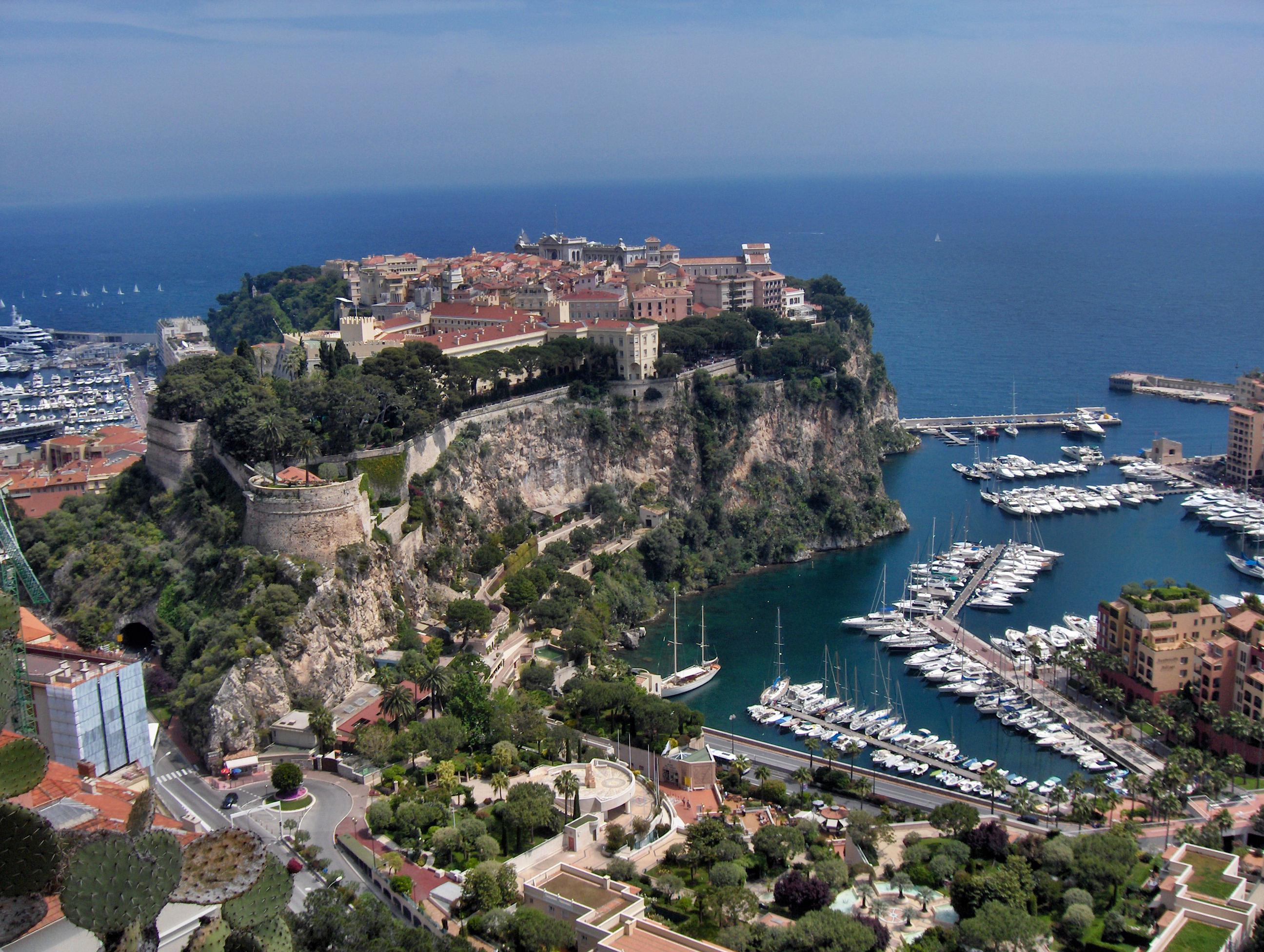
View of the Rock of Monaco

==== Natural geographic features of Monaco ====
- Land reclamation in Monaco
- Rivers of Monaco
- Rock of Monaco

=== Demography of Monaco ===
Demographics of Monaco

== Government and politics of Monaco ==
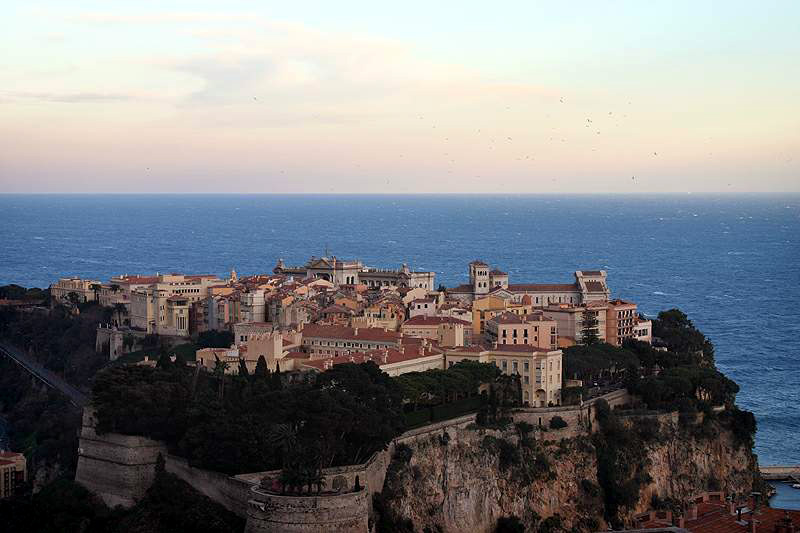
Monaco-Ville

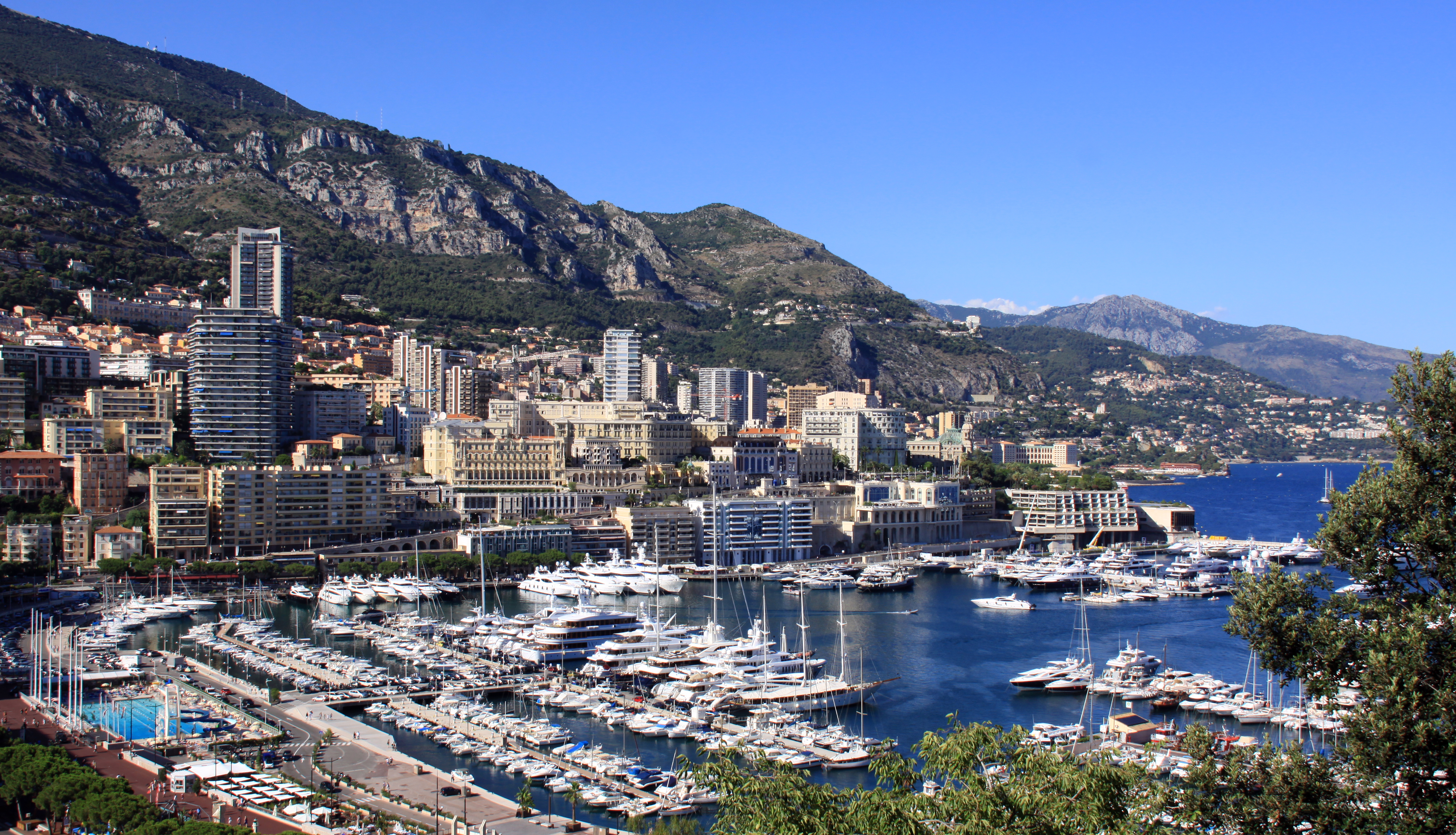
Monte Carlo

Fontvieille

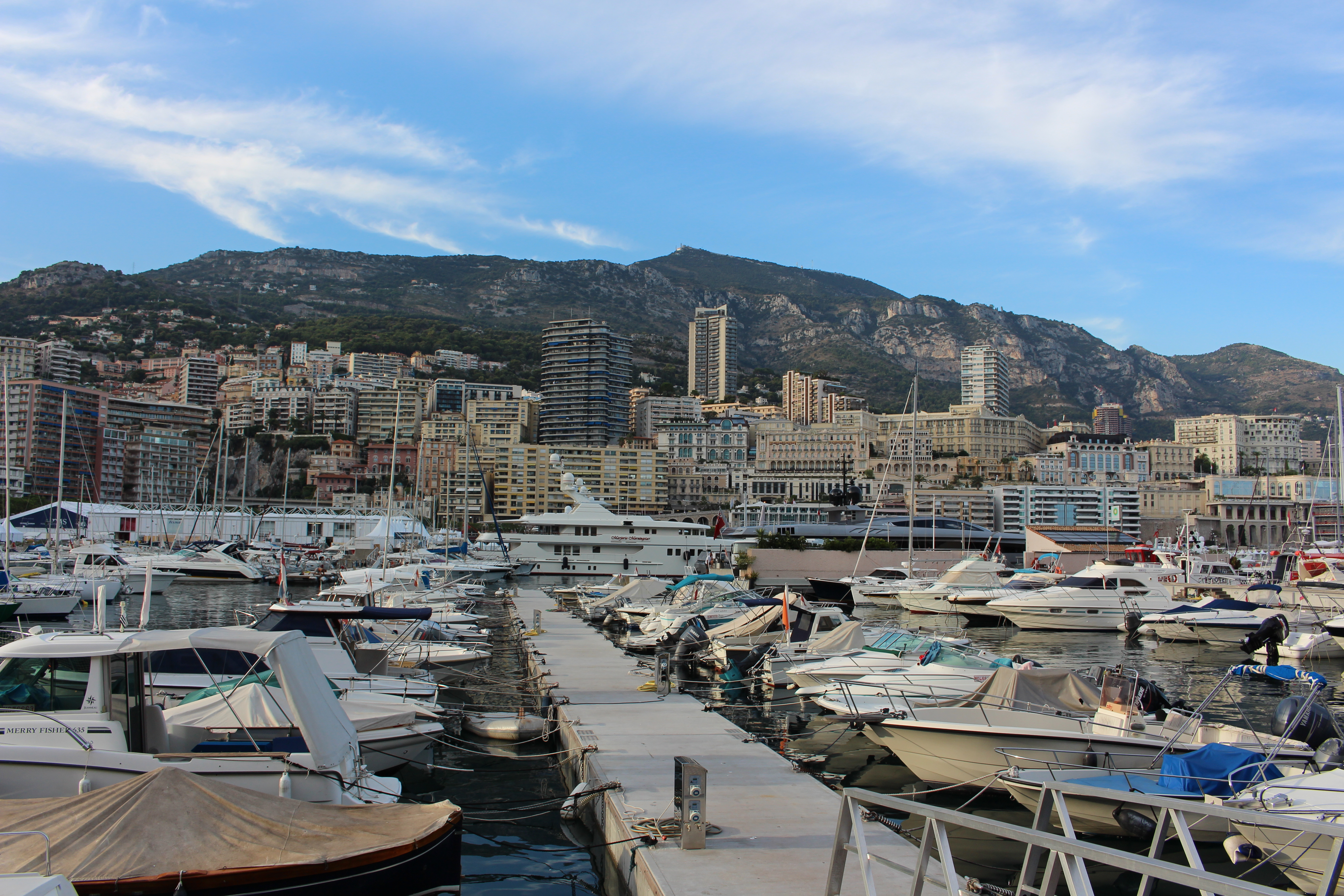
La Condamine

- Form of government: constitutional monarchy
- Capital of Monaco: being a city-state, Monaco is its own capital
  - Administrative divisions: the principality is currently divided into ten wards
    - Monaco-Ville
    - Monte Carlo/Spélugues
    - Fontvieille
    - Moneghetti/Bd de Belgique
    - Les Révoires
    - La Colle
    - La Condamine
    - Saint Michel
    - Larvotto/Bas Moulins
    - La Rousse/Saint Roman
- Elections in Monaco
- Political parties in Monaco
  - Union Monégasque
  - Promotion of the Monegasque Family
  - Union for the Principality

=== Branches of the government of Monaco ===
Government of Monaco

- National and Democratic Union
- National Council of Monaco
- Minister of State (Monaco)
- Crown Council of Monaco
- Council of Government (Monaco)
- Communal Council of Monaco

==== Executive branch of the government of Monaco ====
- Head of state
  - Prince of Monaco
- Head of government: Minister of State
  - Pierre Dartout

==== Legislative branch of the government of Monaco ====
- National Council of Monaco
  - It's a Monaco unicameral parliament
  - It may act independently of the Prince
  - The prince may dissolve it at any time, provided that new elections be held within three months.

==== Judicial branch of the government of Monaco ====
- Supreme Court of Monaco

=== Foreign relations of Monaco ===
Foreign relations of Monaco

- Diplomatic missions in Monaco
- Diplomatic missions of Monaco
- France-Monaco relations
- Monaco–European Union relations
- Monaco–Russia relations
- Monaco–United States relations

==== International organization membership ====
The Principality of Monaco is a member of:

- Council of Europe (CE)
- Food and Agriculture Organization (FAO)
- International Atomic Energy Agency (IAEA)
- International Chamber of Commerce (ICC)
- International Civil Aviation Organization (ICAO)
- International Criminal Court (ICCt) (signatory)
- International Criminal Police Organization (Interpol)
- International Federation of Red Cross and Red Crescent Societies (IFRCS)
- International Hydrographic Organization (IHO)
- International Maritime Organization (IMO)
- International Mobile Satellite Organization (IMSO)
- International Olympic Committee (IOC)
- International Red Cross and Red Crescent Movement (ICRM)
- International Telecommunication Union (ITU)
- International Telecommunications Satellite Organization (ITSO)
- Inter-Parliamentary Union (IPU)
- Member state of the United Nations
- Organisation internationale de la Francophonie (OIF)
- Organization for Security and Cooperation in Europe (OSCE)
- Organisation for the Prohibition of Chemical Weapons (OPCW)
- Schengen Convention
- United Nations Conference on Trade and Development (UNCTAD)
- United Nations Educational, Scientific, and Cultural Organization (UNESCO)
- United Nations Industrial Development Organization (UNIDO)
- Universal Postal Union (UPU)
- World Federation of Trade Unions (WFTU)
- World Health Organization (WHO)
- World Intellectual Property Organization (WIPO)
- World Meteorological Organization (WMO)
- World Tourism Organization (UNWTO)

=== Law and order in Monaco ===
- Constitution of Monaco
- Human rights in Monaco
  - Abortion in Monaco
  - LGBT rights in Monaco
- Law enforcement in Monaco
  - Compagnie des Carabiniers du Prince
  - Capital punishment in Monaco

=== Military of Monaco ===
Military of Monaco

== History of Monaco ==
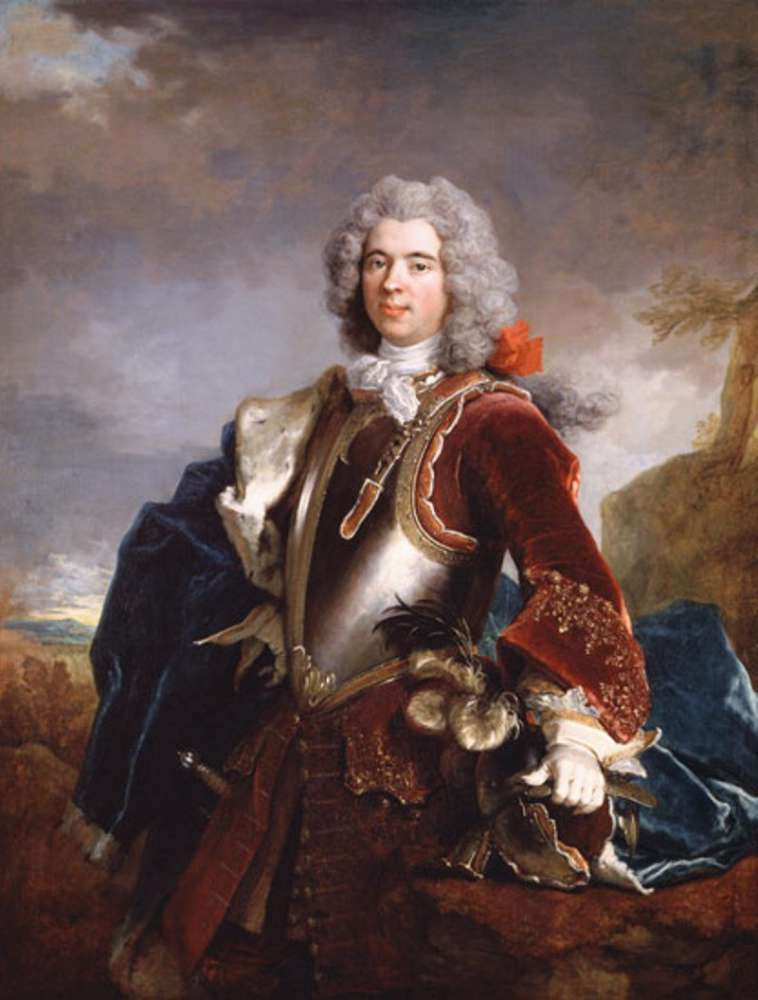
Jacques I, Prince of Monaco

History of Monaco

- Monarchy of Monaco
- Rulers
  - List of rulers of Monaco

=== By period ===
- Anarchism in Monaco

=== By subject ===
- Monégasque Revolution
- Monaco Succession Crisis of 1918

==== House of Grimaldi ====
House of Grimaldi

- Albert I, Prince of Monaco
- Albert II, Prince of Monaco
- Antonio I of Monaco
- Charles I, Lord of Monaco
- Charles III, Prince of Monaco
- Florestan I, Prince of Monaco
- François Grimaldi
- Grimaldo Canella
- Honoré II, Prince of Monaco
- Honoré III, Prince of Monaco
- Honoré IV, Prince of Monaco
- Honoré V, Prince of Monaco
- Jacques I, Prince of Monaco
- Louis II, Prince of Monaco
- Otto Canella
- Rainier I of Monaco, Lord of Cagnes
- Rainier III, Prince of Monaco
- Andrea Casiraghi
- Charlotte Casiraghi
- Pierre Casiraghi
- Stefano Casiraghi
- Louis Ducruet
- Pauline Ducruet
- Clelia Durazzo Grimaldi
- Elisabeth-Anne de Massy
- Louise-Hippolyte, Princess of Monaco
- Pierre de Polignac

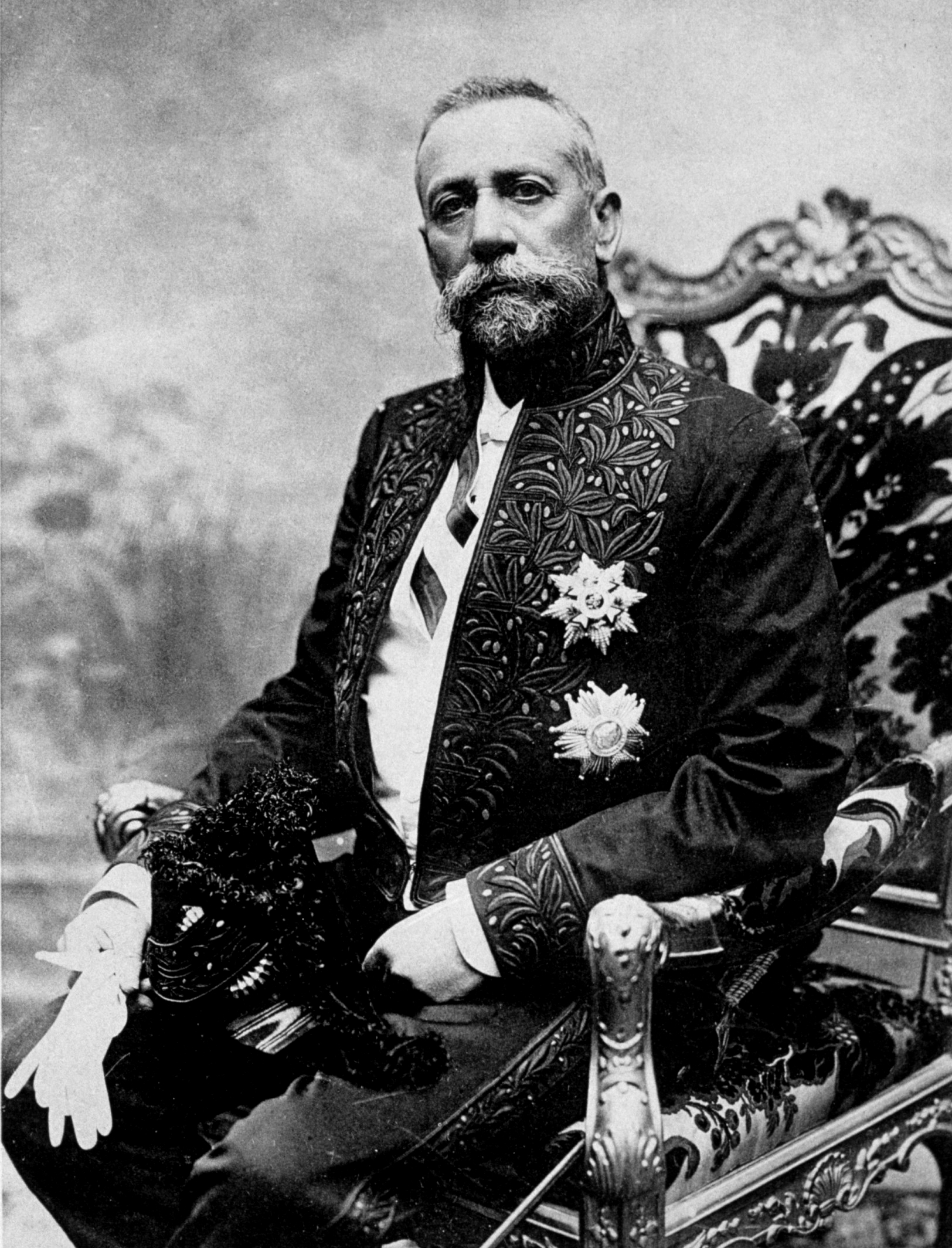
Prince Albert I of Monaco

===== Princes of Monaco =====
- Prince of Monaco
- Line of succession to the Monegasque Throne

===== Monegasque princesses =====
- Caroline, Princess of Hanover
- Princess Charlotte, Duchess of Valentinois
- Princess Stéphanie of Monaco

== Culture of Monaco ==
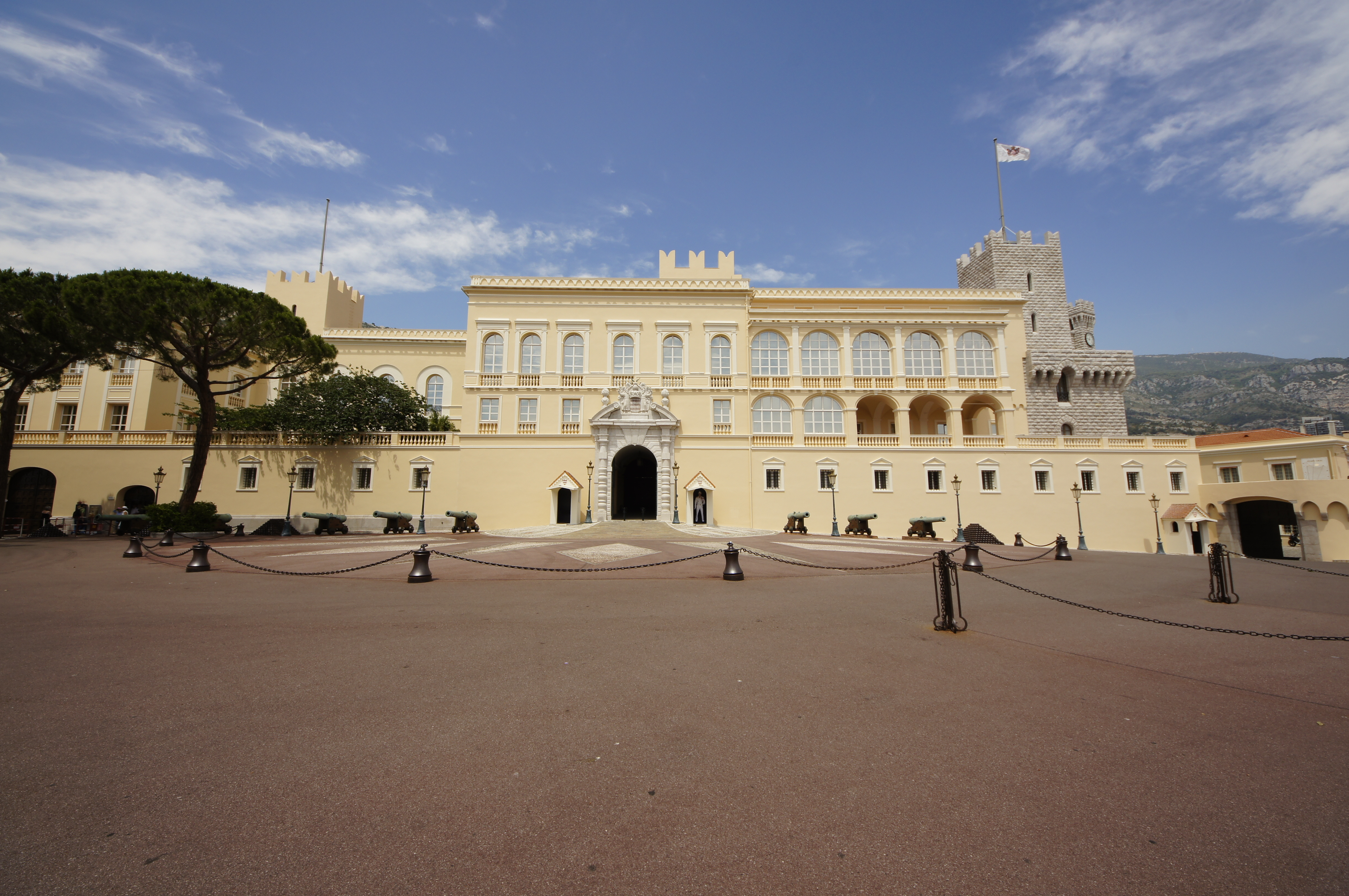
Prince's Palace of Monaco

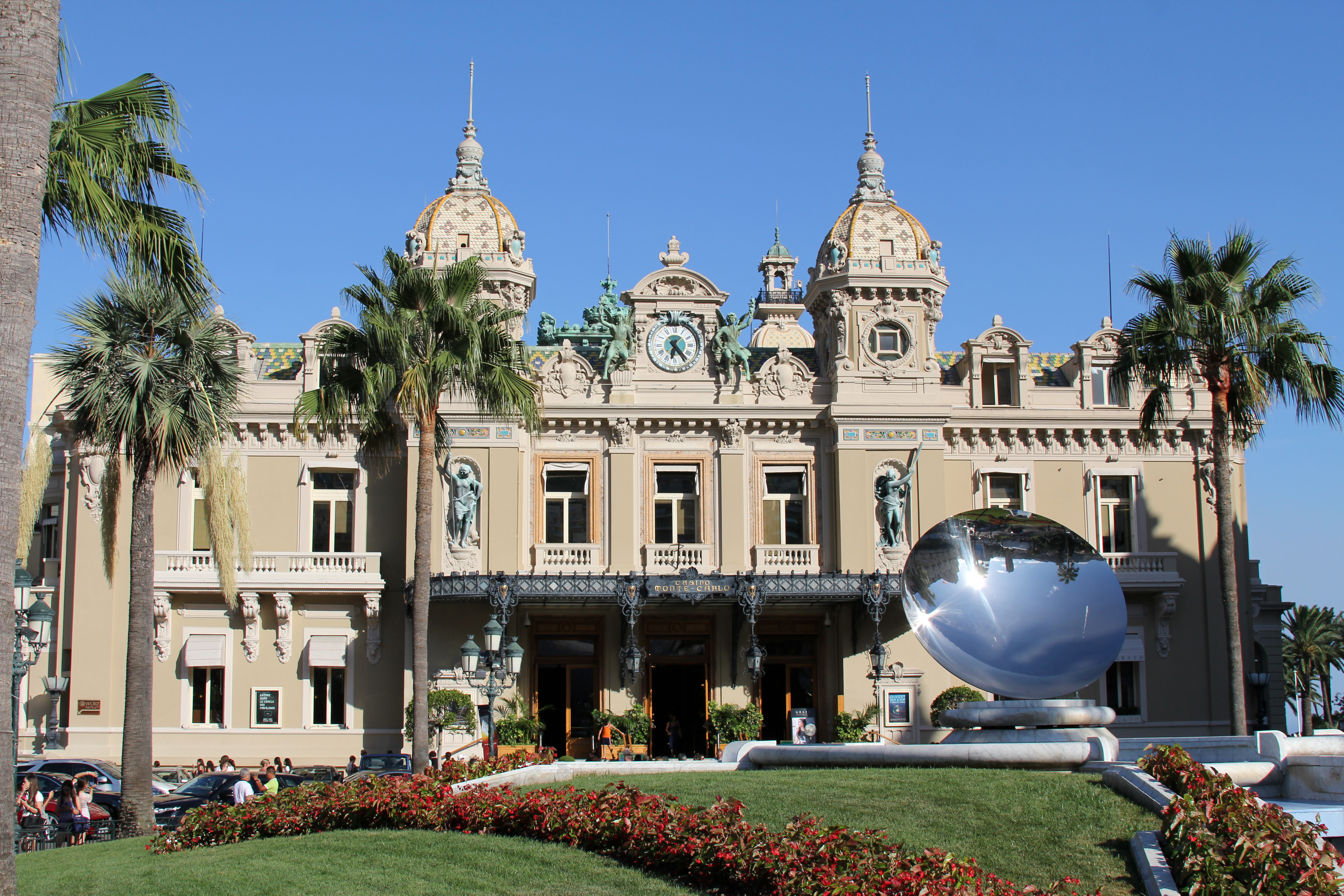
Monte Carlo Casino

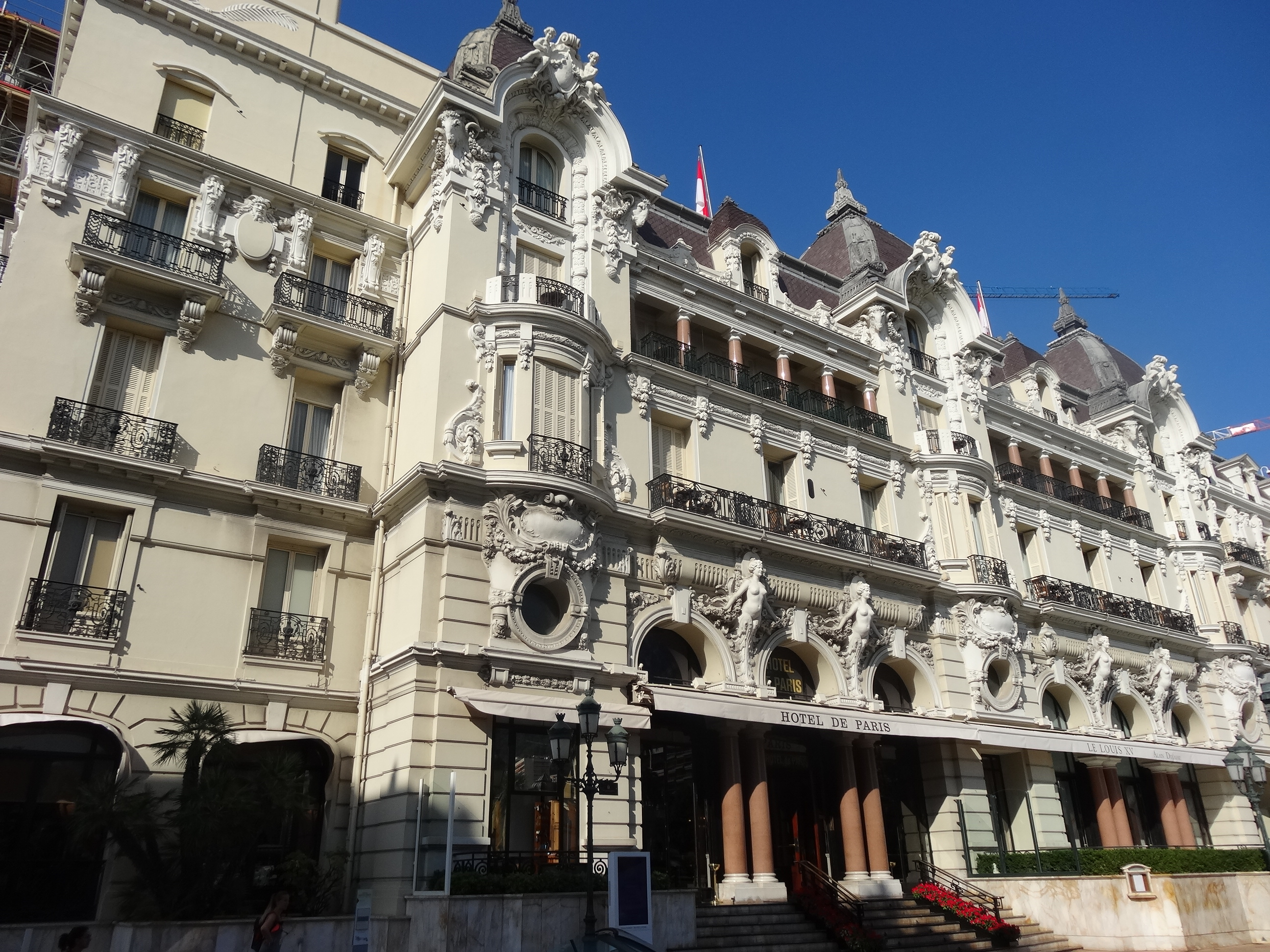
Hôtel de Paris

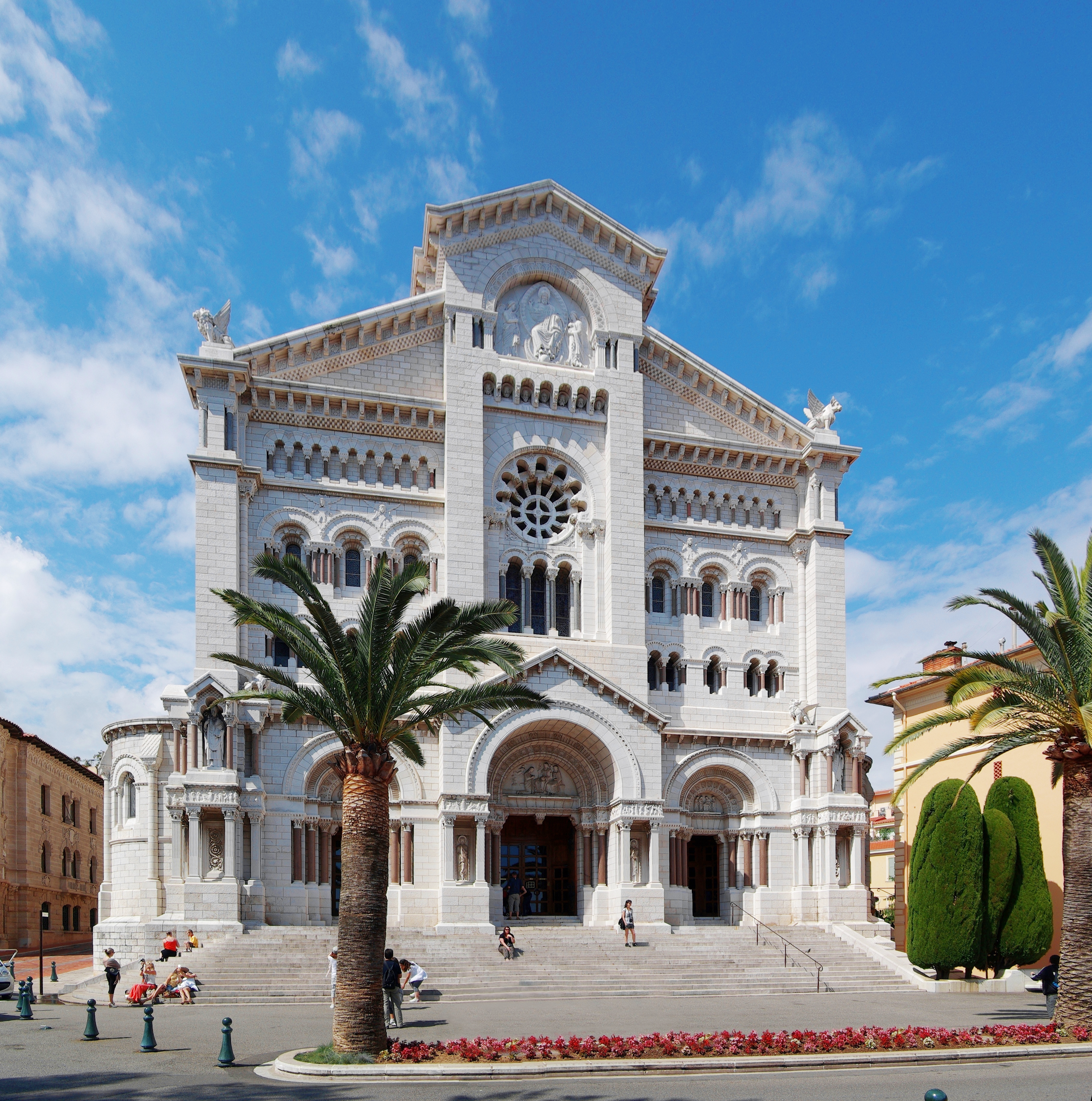
Saint Nicholas Cathedral, Monaco

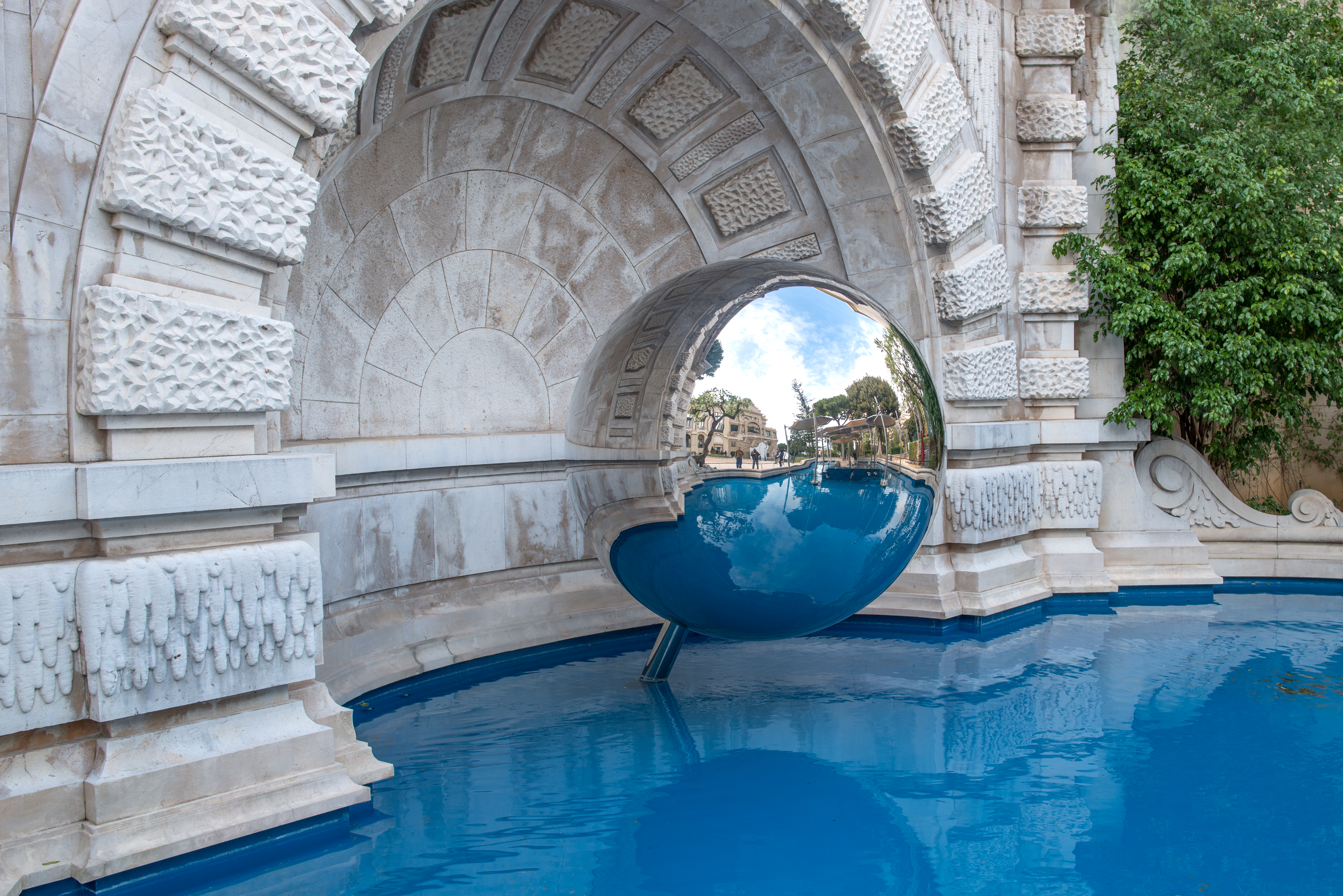
Public art in Monaco

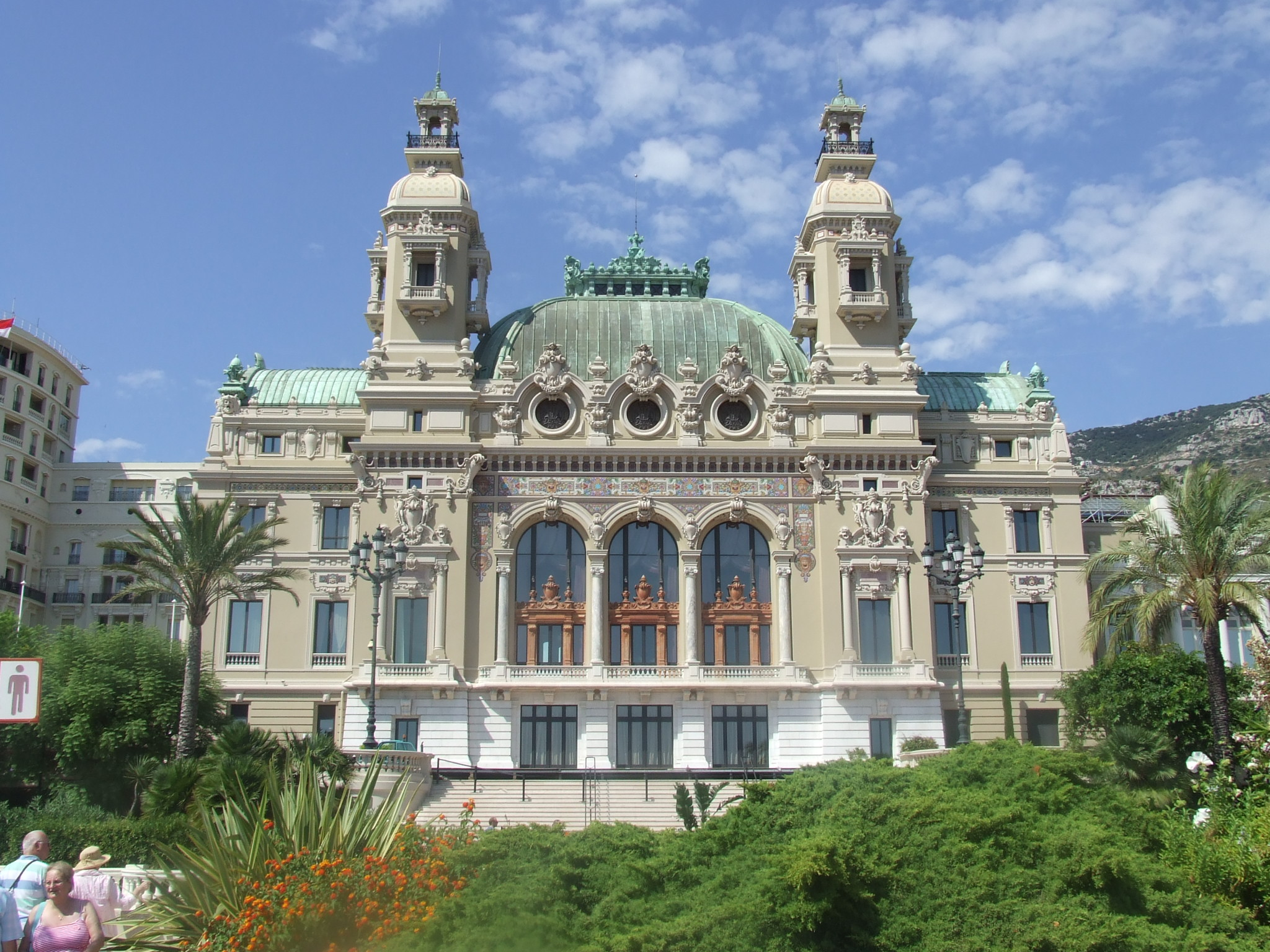
Seaside façade of the Salle Garnier, home of the Opéra de Monte-Carlo

Culture of Monaco

- Architecture of Monaco
  - Hôtel de Paris
  - Monte Carlo Casino
  - Opéra de Monte-Carlo
  - Palaces in Monaco
    - Prince's Palace of Monaco
  - Monaco villas
  - Sports venues in Monaco
    - Stade Louis II
- Cuisine of Monaco
  - Barbajuan
- Languages of Monaco
  - French language
  - Intemelio dialect
  - Monégasque dialect
  - Ligurian language (Romance)
  - Genoese dialect
  - Mentonasque
- Media in Monaco
  - Radio stations in Monaco
  - Television in Monaco
  - Newspapers in Monaco
- Monegasque awards
  - Orders, decorations, and medals of Monaco
    - Order of the Crown (Monaco)
    - Order of Grimaldi
    - Orders and decorations of Monaco
    - Order of St. Charles
- National symbols of Monaco
  - Coat of arms of Monaco
  - Flag of Monaco
  - National anthem of Monaco
- People of Monaco
- Scouts in Monaco
- Titles in Monaco
  - Counts and dukes of Rethel
  - Duke of Valentinois
  - Hereditary Prince of Monaco
  - Marquis of Baux
  - Prince of Monaco
- World Heritage Sites in Monaco: None

=== Art in Monaco ===
- Public art in Monaco

==== Monegasque music ====
- Music of Monaco
  - Opéra de Monte-Carlo
  - Monte-Carlo Philharmonic Orchestra
  - Les Ballets de Monte Carlo

==== Monegasque Eurovision songs ====
- À chacun sa chanson
- Allons, allons les enfants
- Bien plus fort
- Boum-Badaboum
- Ce soir-là
- Celui qui reste et celui qui s'en va
- Comme on s'aime
- Dis rien
- L'amour s'en va
- La Coco-Dance
- Les jardins de Monaco
- Maman, maman
- Marlène
- Mon ami Pierrot
- Notre planète
- Notre vie c'est la musique
- Où sont-elles passées
- Toi, la musique et moi
- Tout de moi
- Un banc, un arbre, une rue
- Un train qui part
- Une chanson c'est une lettre
- Une petite française
- Va dire à l'amour

=== Religion in Monaco ===
- Religion in Monaco
  - Christianity in Monaco
    - Roman Catholicism in Monaco
  - Islam in Monaco
  - Judaism in Monaco

=== Sports in Monaco ===
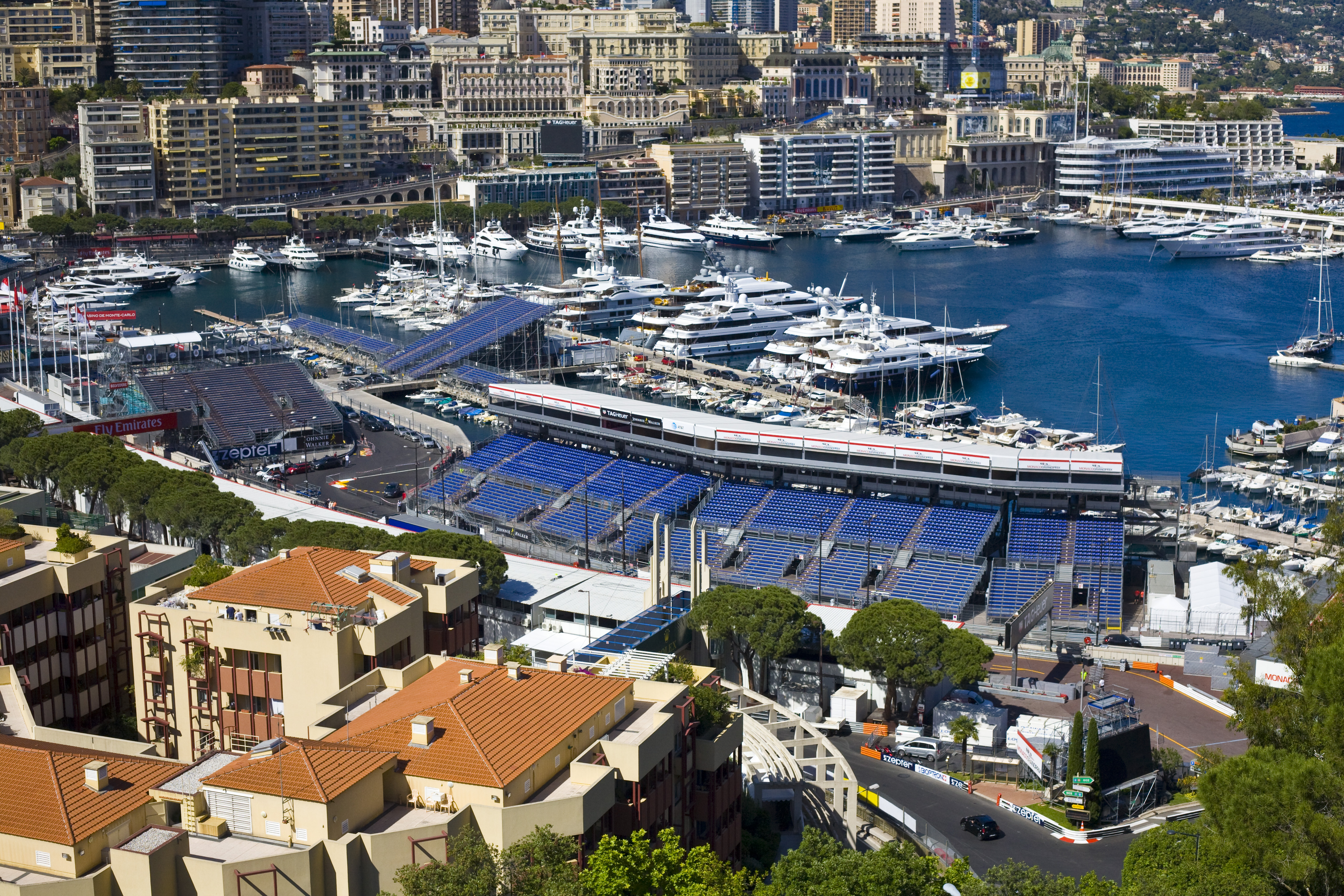
The Monaco harbour during the days of the 2016 Monaco Grand Prix

Sport in Monaco

- Monaco at the Olympics
- 1929 Monaco Grand Prix
- Monte-Carlo Masters
- Monegasque Rugby Federation
- Herculis
- Monaco national rugby union team
- Monte Carlo Open (golf)
- Monte Carlo Rally

==== Football in Monaco ====
- Football in Monaco
- AS Monaco FC
- Monaco national football team

===== AS Monaco FC =====
- 2004 UEFA Champions League Final
- AS Monaco FC
- Stade Louis II

====== AS Monaco FC players ======
- Sonny Anderson
- Fabien Audard
- Fabien Barthez
- Bruno Bellone
- Ali Benarbia
- Lucas Bernardi
- Oliver Bierhoff
- Basile Boli
- Fabian Guedes
- Søren Busk
- Souleymane Camara
- Sebastian Carole
- Javier Chevantón
- Philippe Christanval
- John Collins
- Costinha
- Alain Couriol
- Éric Cubilier
- Ousmane Dabo
- Éric Di Meco
- David di Tommaso
- Marco Di Vaio
- Salif Diao
- Martin Djetou
- Youri Djorkaeff
- Cyril Domoraud
- Manuel dos Santos Fernandes
- Franck Dumas
- Ralf Edström
- Hassan El Fakiri
- Jean-Luc Ettori
- Patrice Evra
- Pontus Farnerud
- Amady Faye
- Youssouf Falikou Fofana
- Marcelo Gallardo
- Bernard Genghini
- David Gigliotti
- Ludovic Giuly
- Gaël Givet
- Marco Grassi
- Sébastien Grax
- Gilles Grimandi
- Mark Hateley
- Thierry Henry
- Glenn Hoddle
- Hugo Ibarra
- Victor Ikpeba
- Vladimir Jugović
- Franck Jurietti
- Mohamed Kallon
- Olivier Kapo
- Jürgen Klinsmann
- Jan Koller
- Muhamed Konjic
- Sabri Lamouchi
- Sylvain Legwinski
- Jerko Leko
- Philippe Léonard
- Søren Lerby
- Alexandre Licata
- Gerard López
- Mickaël Madar
- Rafael Márquez
- Camel Meriem
- Roger Milla
- Bora Milutinovic
- Sylvain Monsoreau
- Fernando Morientes
- Shabani Nonda
- Alex Nyarko
- Christian Panucci
- José Omar Pastoriza
- Diego Pérez
- Emmanuel Petit
- Stéphane Porato
- Dado Pršo
- Claude Puel
- Yannick Quesnel
- Florin Raducioiu
- John Arne Riise
- Julien Rodriguez
- Flavio Roma
- Jérôme Rothen
- Willy Sagnol
- Franck Sauzée
- Enzo Scifo
- Marco Simone
- Maicon Douglas Sisenando
- John Sivebæk
- Robert Špehar
- Sébastien Squillaci
- Tony Sylva
- Lilian Thuram
- Yaya Touré
- Armand Traoré
- David Trezeguet
- Gonzalo Vargas
- Christian Vieri
- Guillaume Warmuz
- George Weah
- Akis Zikos

==== Monaco Grand Prix ====
- Monaco Grand Prix
- 1929 Monaco Grand Prix
- 1950 Monaco Grand Prix
- 1955 Monaco Grand Prix
- 1956 Monaco Grand Prix
- 1957 Monaco Grand Prix
- 1958 Monaco Grand Prix
- 1959 Monaco Grand Prix
- 1960 Monaco Grand Prix
- 1961 Monaco Grand Prix
- 1962 Monaco Grand Prix
- 1963 Monaco Grand Prix
- 1964 Monaco Grand Prix
- 1965 Monaco Grand Prix
- 1966 Monaco Grand Prix
- 1967 Monaco Grand Prix
- 1968 Monaco Grand Prix
- 1969 Monaco Grand Prix
- 1970 Monaco Grand Prix
- 1971 Monaco Grand Prix
- 1972 Monaco Grand Prix
- 1973 Monaco Grand Prix
- 1974 Monaco Grand Prix
- 1975 Monaco Grand Prix
- 1976 Monaco Grand Prix
- 1977 Monaco Grand Prix
- 1978 Monaco Grand Prix
- 1979 Monaco Grand Prix
- 1980 Monaco Grand Prix
- 1981 Monaco Grand Prix
- 1982 Monaco Grand Prix
- 1983 Monaco Grand Prix
- 1984 Monaco Grand Prix
- 1985 Monaco Grand Prix
- 1987 Monaco Grand Prix
- 1988 Monaco Grand Prix
- 1989 Monaco Grand Prix
- 1990 Monaco Grand Prix
- 1991 Monaco Grand Prix
- 1992 Monaco Grand Prix
- 1993 Monaco Grand Prix
- 1994 Monaco Grand Prix
- 1995 Monaco Grand Prix
- 1996 Monaco Grand Prix
- 1997 Monaco Grand Prix
- 1998 Monaco Grand Prix
- 1999 Monaco Grand Prix
- 2000 Monaco Grand Prix
- 2001 Monaco Grand Prix
- 2002 Monaco Grand Prix
- 2003 Monaco Grand Prix
- 2004 Monaco Grand Prix
- 2005 Monaco Grand Prix
- 2006 Monaco Grand Prix
- 2007 Monaco Grand Prix
- 2008 Monaco Grand Prix
- 2009 Monaco Grand Prix
- 2010 Monaco Grand Prix
- 2011 Monaco Grand Prix
- 2012 Monaco Grand Prix
- 2013 Monaco Grand Prix
- 2014 Monaco Grand Prix
- Circuit de Monaco

==== Monaco at the Olympics ====
- Monaco at the 1920 Summer Olympics
- Monaco at the 1924 Summer Olympics
- Monaco at the 1928 Summer Olympics
- Monaco at the 1936 Summer Olympics
- Monaco at the 1948 Summer Olympics
- Monaco at the 1952 Summer Olympics
- Monaco at the 1960 Summer Olympics
- Monaco at the 1964 Summer Olympics
- Monaco at the 1968 Summer Olympics
- Monaco at the 1972 Summer Olympics
- Monaco at the 1976 Summer Olympics
- Monaco at the 1984 Summer Olympics
- Monaco at the 1984 Winter Olympics
- Monaco at the 1988 Summer Olympics
- Monaco at the 1988 Winter Olympics
- Monaco at the 1992 Summer Olympics
- Monaco at the 1992 Winter Olympics
- Monaco at the 1994 Winter Olympics
- Monaco at the 1996 Summer Olympics
- Monaco at the 1998 Winter Olympics
- Monaco at the 2000 Summer Olympics
- Monaco at the 2002 Winter Olympics
- Monaco at the 2004 Summer Olympics
- Monaco at the 2006 Winter Olympics
- Monaco at the 2008 Summer Olympics
- Monaco at the 2010 Winter Olympics
- Monaco at the 2012 Summer Olympics
- Monaco at the 2014 Winter Olympics
- Monaco at the 2016 Summer Olympics
- Monaco at the 2018 Winter Olympics
- Monaco at the 2020 Summer Olympics

== Economy and infrastructure of Monaco ==
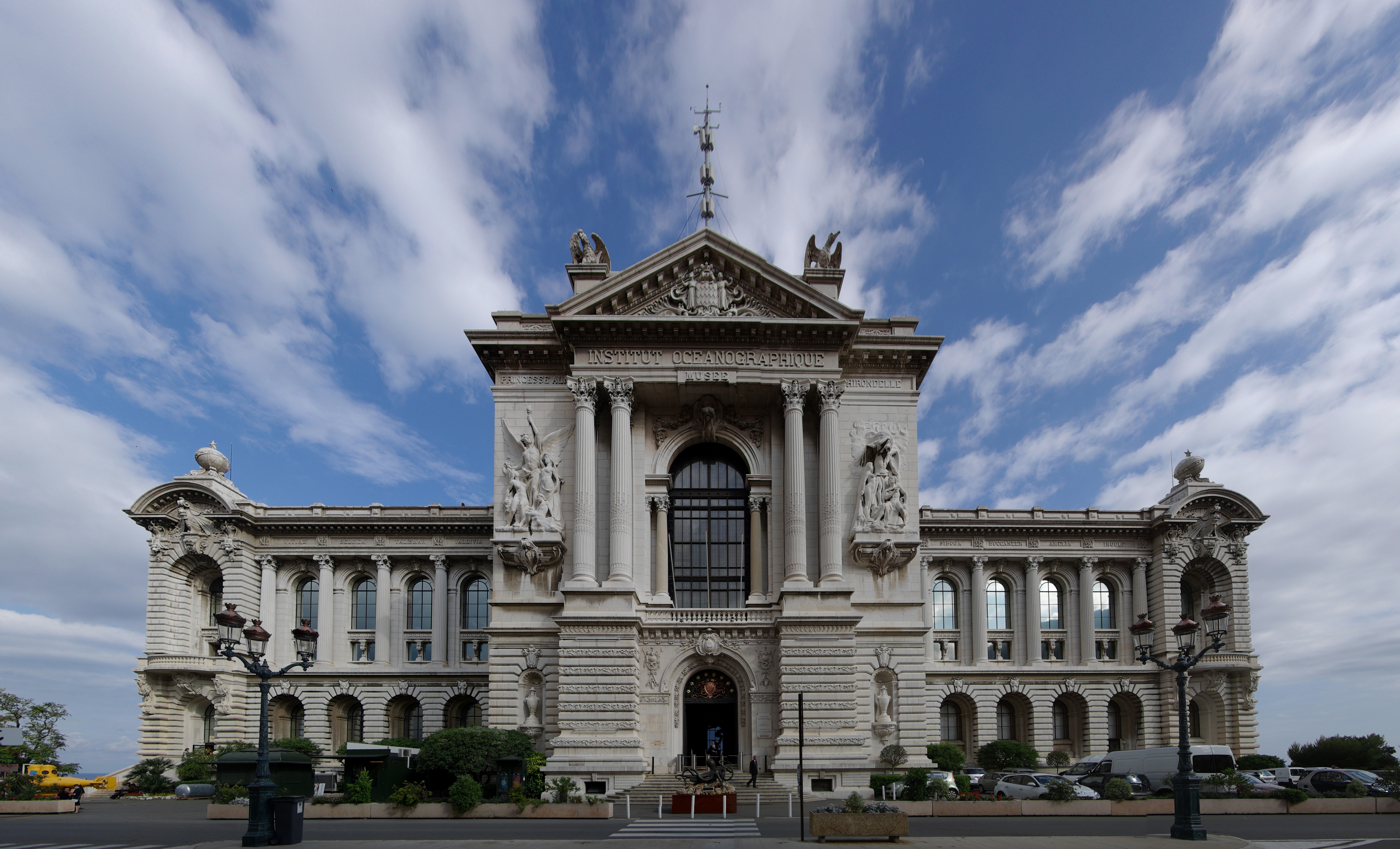
Oceanographic Museum Monaco

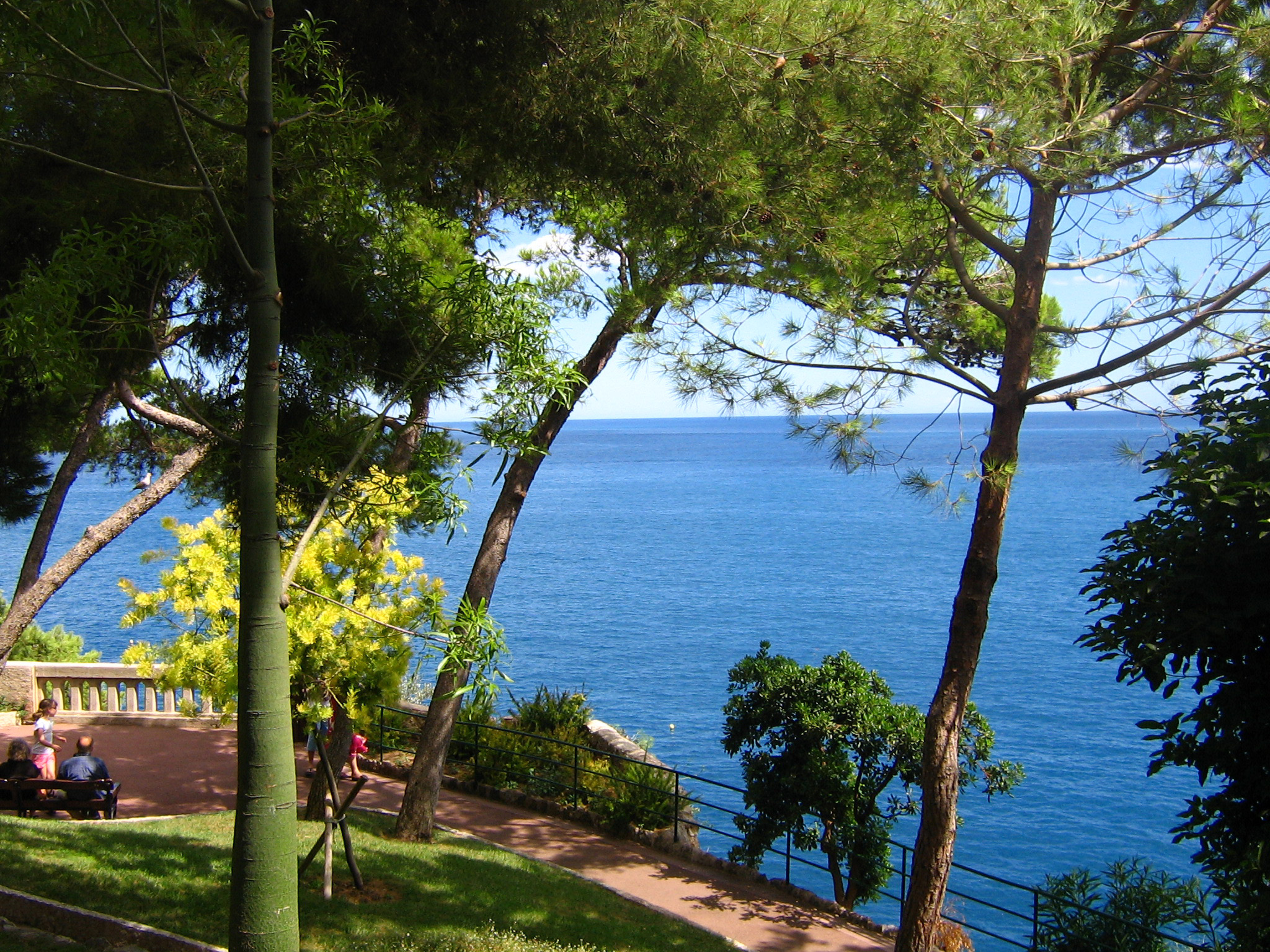
Saint Martin Gardens

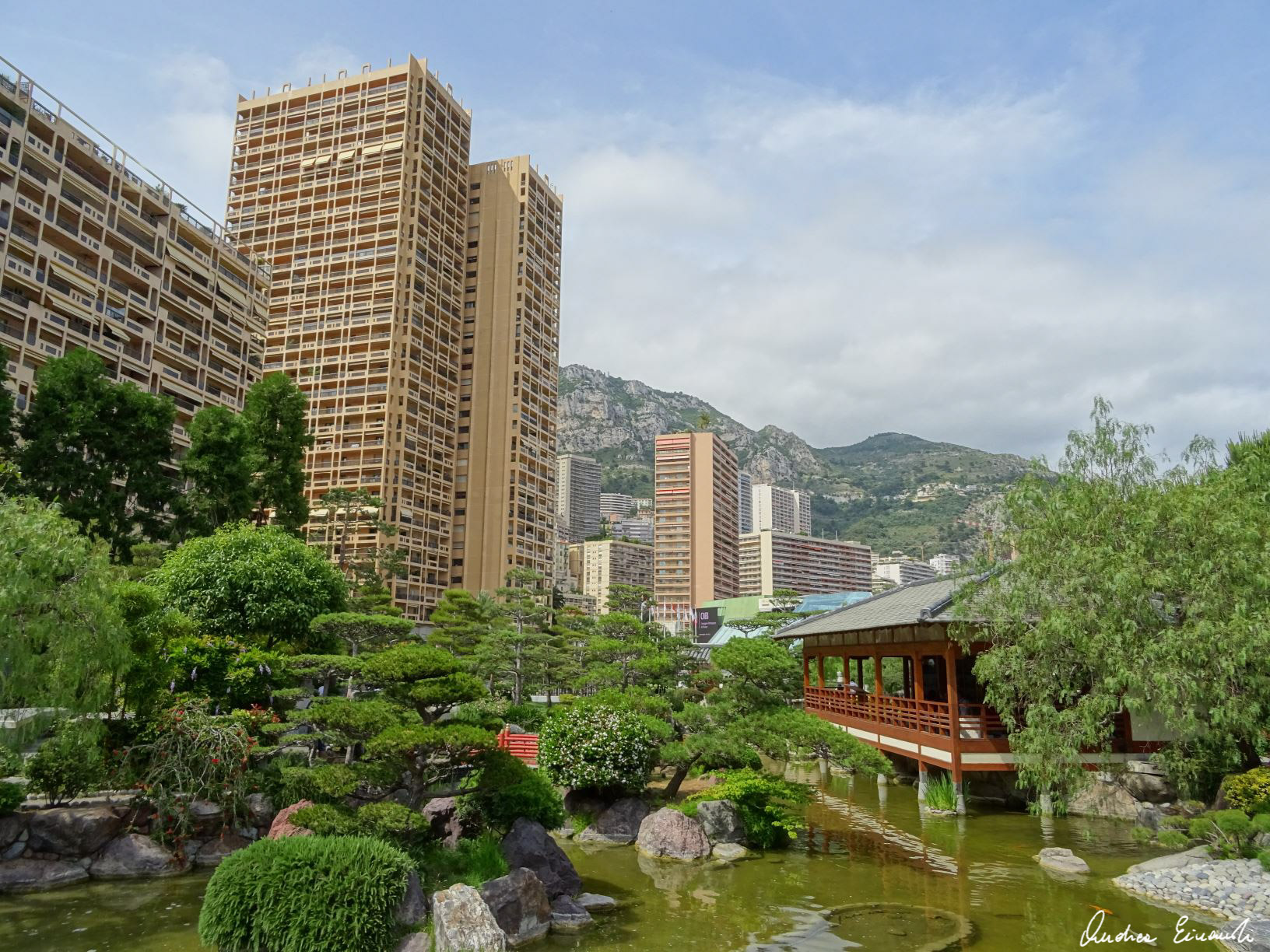
Japanese Gardens

Economy of Monaco

- Economic rank, by nominal GDP (2007): 161st (one hundred and sixty first)
- Banks of Monaco
- Communications in Monaco
  - Monaco Telecom
  - La Poste Monaco
- Currency of Monaco: Euro (see also: Euro topics)
  - ISO 4217: EUR
  - Monegasque euro coins
  - Previous currency:Monegasque franc
- Energy in Monaco
- Tourism in Monaco
  - Hotels in Monaco
    - Fairmont Monte Carlo
    - Hôtel de Paris
    - Hôtel Hermitage Monte-Carlo
    - Hotel Metropole, Monte Carlo
    - Monte-Carlo Bay Hotel & Resort
  - Museums in Monaco
    - Monaco Top Cars Collection
    - Museum of Prehistoric Anthropology
    - New National Museum of Monaco
    - Oceanographic Museum
  - Parks and botanical garden
    - Casino Gardens and Terraces
    - Fontvieille Park and Princess Grace Rose Garden
    - Jardin Exotique de Monaco
    - Japanese Garden, Monaco
    - St Martin Gardens
    - Zoological Garden of Monaco
  - Restaurants and cafés in Monaco
    - Le Louis XV
- Trade unions of Monaco
  - Union of Monaco Trade Unions

=== Transport in Monaco ===
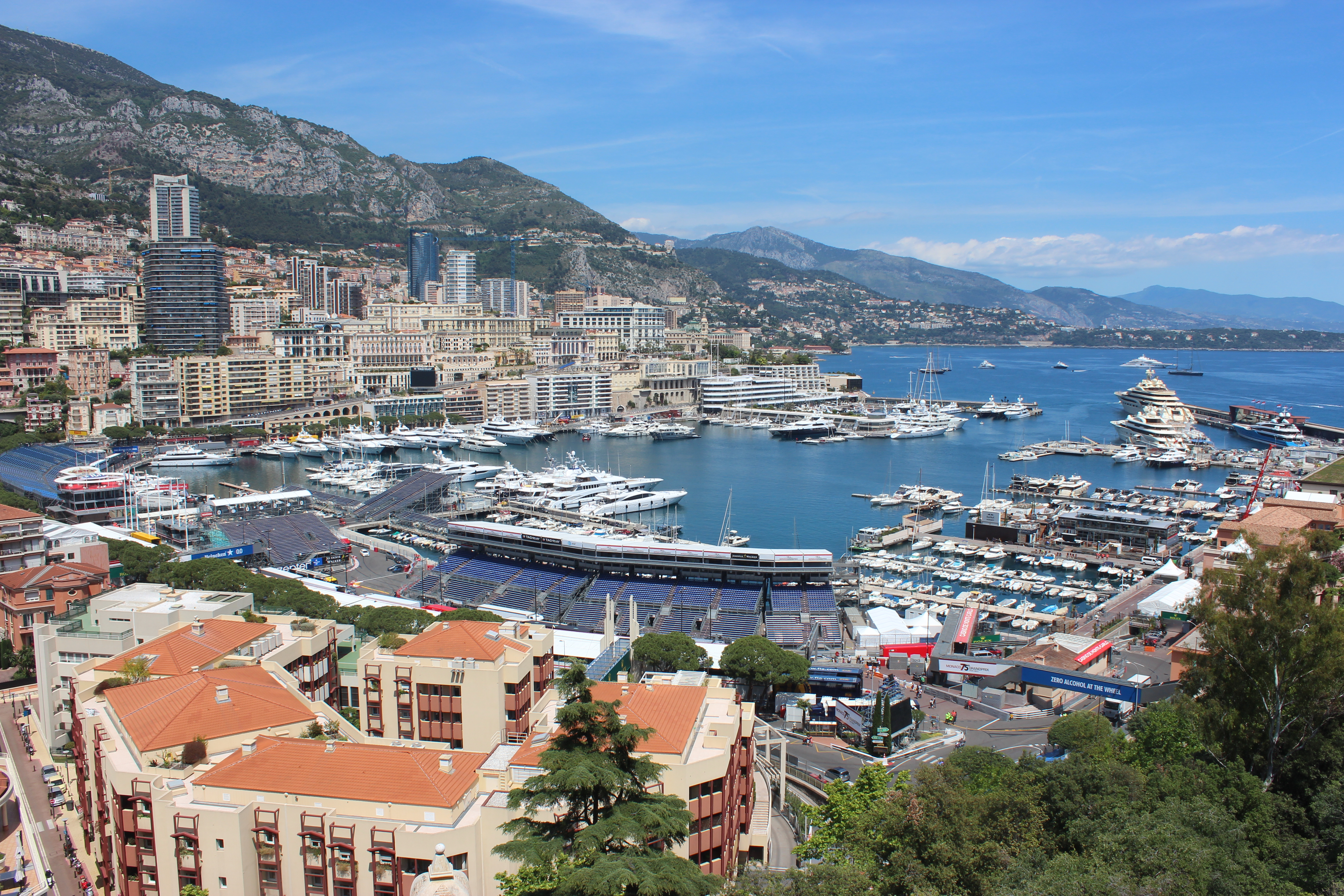
Port Hercules

- Transport in Monaco
  - Chemin des Révoires
  - Monaco Heliport
    - Heli Air Monaco
    - Monacair
  - Port Hercules
  - Rail transport in Monaco

== Education in Monaco ==
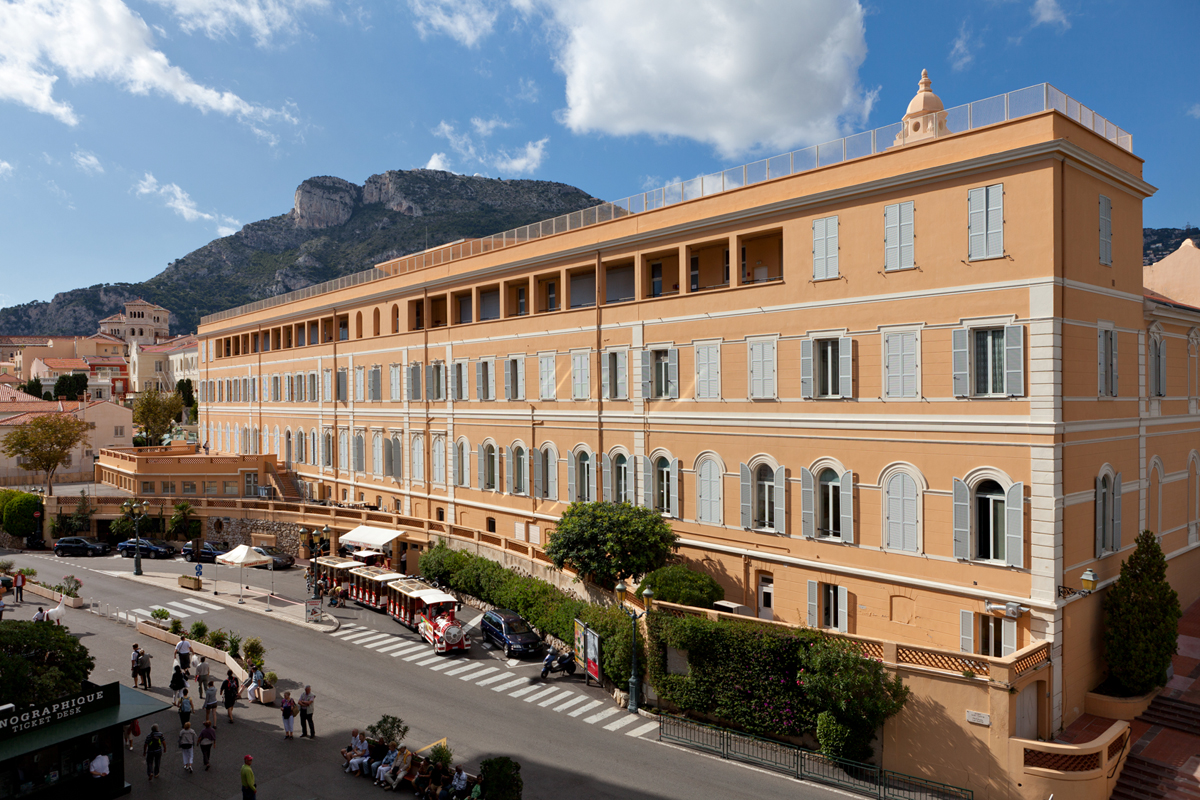
Lycée Albert Premier of Monaco

- International School of Monaco
- Lycée Albert Premier
- International University of Monaco
- American College of Monaco

== Health in Monaco ==
Health in Monaco

- Cardiothoracic Center of Monaco
- Princess Grace Hospital Centre

== Monegasque people ==
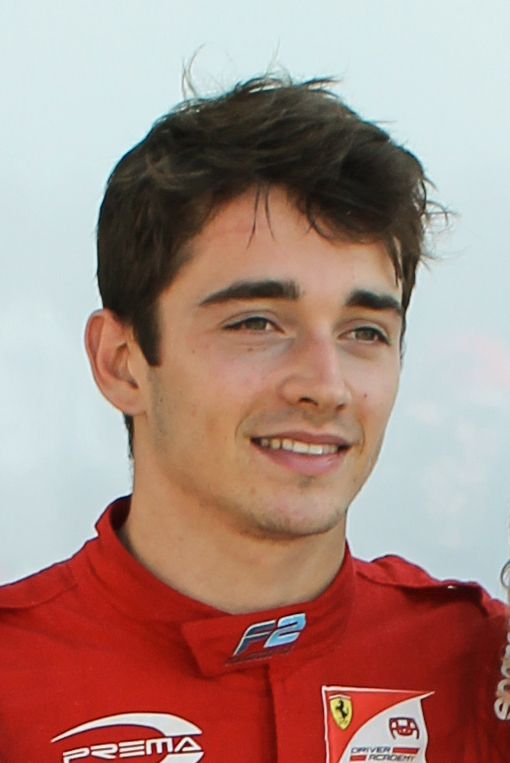
Charles Leclerc

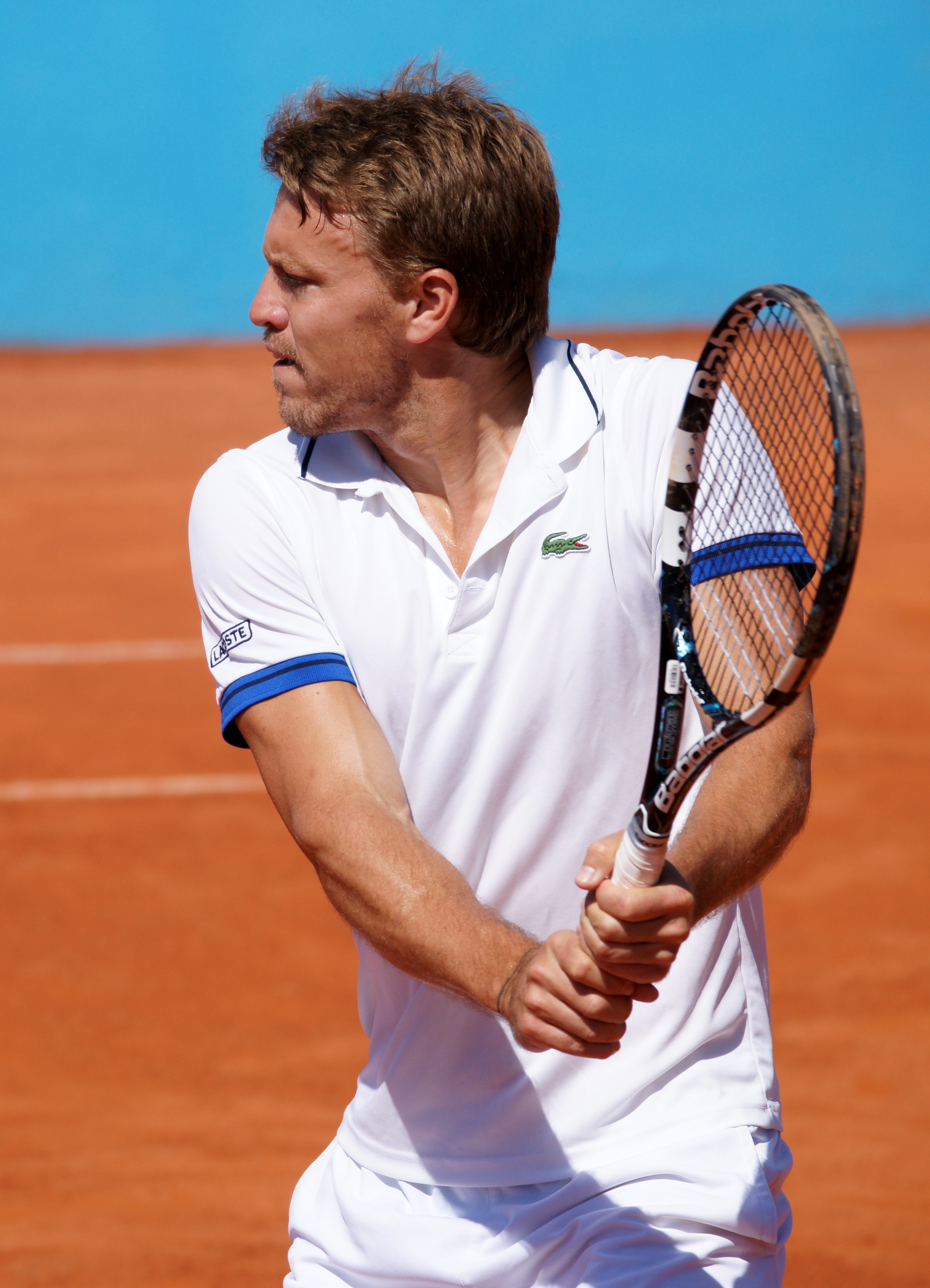
Benjamin Balleret

=== Businesspersons ===
- Gildo Pallanca Pastor

=== Judges ===
- Isabelle Berro-Lefèvre

=== Painters ===
- Jean-François Bosio
- Pierre Roland Renoir

=== Singers ===
- Laurent Vaguener
- Princess Stéphanie of Monaco

=== Sportspeople ===
- Benjamin Balleret
- Charles Leclerc
- Clivio Piccione
- Daniel Elena
- Louis Chiron
- Olivier Beretta
- Pierre Frolla
- Sebastien Gattuso

=== Writers and poets ===
- Léo Ferré
- Louis Notari

== Other articles ==
- Annales monégasques
- Association des Guides et Scouts de Monaco
- Catholic Church in Monaco
- Comité Olympique Monégasque
- Department of External Relations
- Devota
- Euro gold and silver commemorative coins
- Fédération patronale monégasque
- Franco-Monegasque Treaty
- Hereditary Prince of Monaco
- Horizon Monaco
- Îlot Pasteur
- La Ruche, Fontvieille
- Louis Notari Library
- Monacair
- Monaco Cemetery
- Monaco Shooting Federation
- Monaco Yacht Show
- Monégasque euro coins
- Monégasque identity card
- Monégasque nationality law
- Monégasque passport
- Museum of the Chapel of Visitation
- Princess Grace Irish Library
- Public holidays in Monaco
- Roman Catholicism in Monaco
- Société des bains de mer de Monaco
- Sporting d'Hiver
- Telephone numbers in Monaco
- Théâtre Princesse Grace
- Vehicle registration plates of Monaco
- Yacht Club de Monaco
- Zoological Garden of Monaco

== See also ==
- List of international rankings
- Outline of Europe
