= Principality and Diocese of Monaco =

The Roman Catholic church refers to Monaco as the Principality and Diocese of Monaco. Catholicism is the state religion and the majority religion of Monaco and the boundaries of the political principality are coterminous with that of the Catholic diocese. For further information, please see:

- Catholic Church in Monaco
- Roman Catholic Archdiocese of Monaco
- Principality of Monaco
