= Association of Guides and Scouts of Monaco =

National Scout and Guide organization of Monaco

Association des Guides et Scouts de Monaco
- Guide and Scout Association of Monaco
- Country: Monaco
- Founded: 1992
- Membership: 84
- Affiliation: World Association of Girl Guides and Girl Scouts, World Organization of the Scout Movement
- Website http://www.guides-scouts-monaco.com

Monaco has one of the world's smallest national Scouting and Guiding organizations, the Association des Guides et Scouts de Monaco (AGSM). The association has about 84 members (61 Scouts (as of 2010), 23 Guides (as of 2003)). Its headquarters is located in the presbytery of the Sacred Heart parish church in Moneghetti.

The Monegasque Scout organization was under the patronage of French Scouting since 1918, and became an independent member of the World Organization of the Scout Movement in 1990. The first Guide company in Monaco formed in 1929, and Guiding developed under the Guides de France. In 1953 work began on forming an independent Guide association which was achieved in 1956, and became a member of the World Association of Girl Guides and Girl Scouts in 1963. In 1992 the Scout association and the Guide association merged and formed the AGSM.

There is a Sea Scout division which conducts many activities on the Mediterranean Sea.

The Scouts of Monaco have historically cooperated with the World Scout Bureau, although they were not members until 1990.

== Program sections ==
The program sections are those of French Scouts et Guides de France organisation :

- Louveteaux, jeannettes (Cubs) : 8 to 11
- Scouts, guides (Scouts) : 11 to 14
- Pionniers, caravelles (Senior Scouts) : 14 to 17
- Compagnons/ (Rovers) : 17 to 20

== Scout Motto ==
The Scout Motto is Scouts Toujours Prêt, Scouts Always Ready in French.
