= Moneghetti =

Moneghetti may refer to:

- Les Moneghetti, quarter of Monaco
- Steve Moneghetti (born 1962), Australian long-distance runner
