= Languages of Monaco =

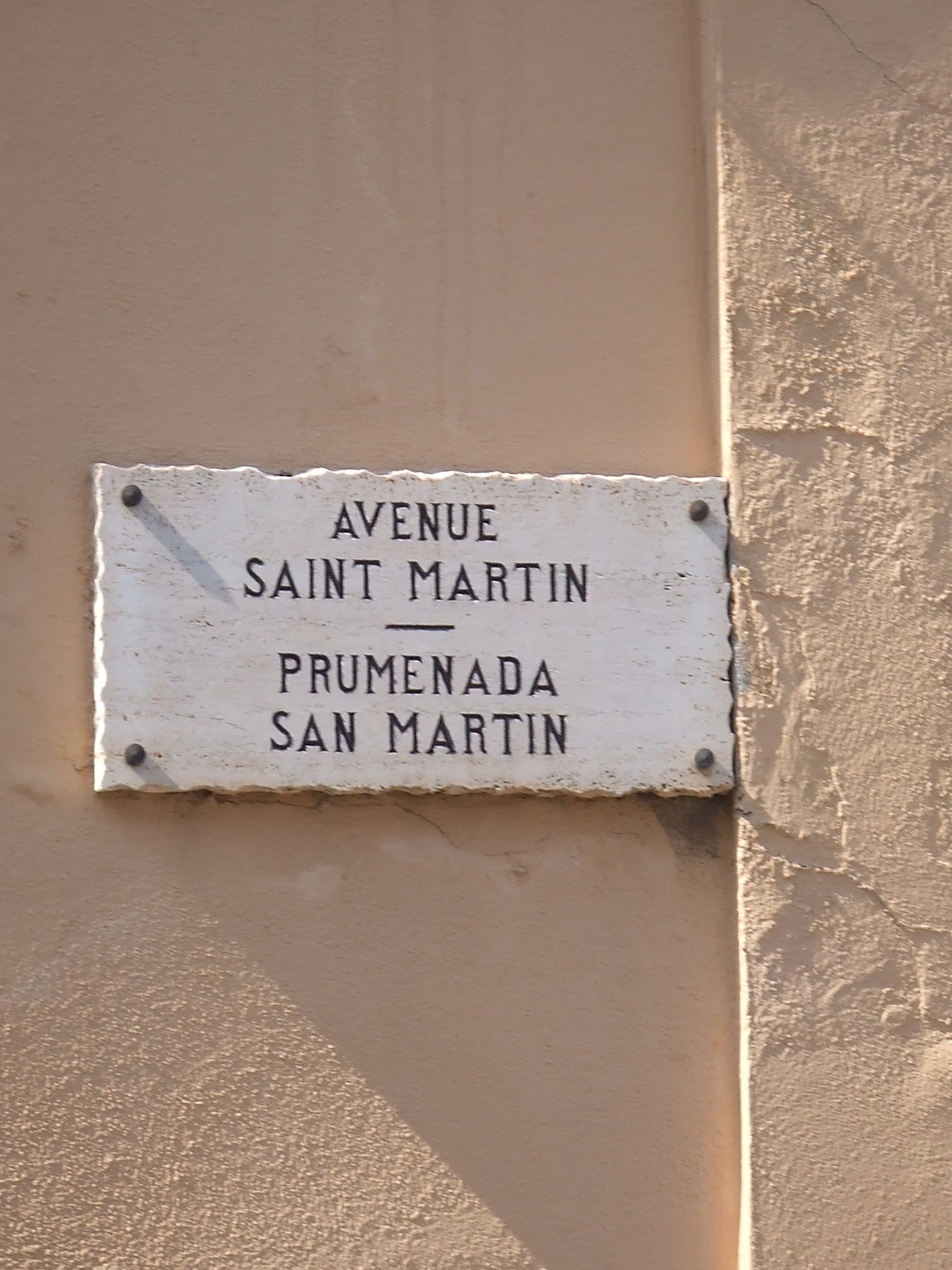
- A bilingual French-Monégasque street sign
- Official: French
- Minority: Monégasque, Italian
- Foreign: English
- Signed: French Sign Language
- Keyboard layout: AZERTY

The official language of Monaco is French. Monégasque, a variety of Ligurian, is the national language of the Monégasque people. However, it is the primary language of very few people. There are several other languages spoken in addition to French and Monégasque, including Italian and English.

== French ==
French is the only official—and by far the most common—language in Monaco, a result of the role France has had over the microstate, since the annexation of the County of Nice, which surrounds Monaco, in 1860.

== Monégasque ==
Monégasque is the traditional national language of the Monegasque people (who represent only 21.6% of the total population). It is a dialect of Ligurian, and is somewhat similar to Italian.

Because the Monégasques are a minority in Monaco, their tongue was threatened with extinction in the 1970s. However, the language is now being taught in schools. In the old part of Monaco, the street signs are marked with Monégasque in addition to French.

During his accession ceremonies in 2005, Albert II, Prince of Monaco, made a speech to his people in Monégasque.

== Italian ==
Standard Italian is also a major language in Monaco. Italian nationals make up 19% of the total population.

Italian was the ancestral language of the ruling House of Grimaldi, and was the official language of Monaco until 1860, when it was replaced by French. This was due to the annexation of the surrounding County of Nice to France following the Treaty of Turin (1860).

Italian is also spoken by Caroline, Princess of Hanover and her children Andrea Casiraghi, Charlotte Casiraghi and Pierre Casiraghi, as her late husband was Italian.

== English ==
There is also an Anglophone community in Monaco (8.5% of which are from the United Kingdom or the United States, with English-speakers from other nations as too insignificant and thus listed within the category of "other," below), in addition to English-speaking tourists visiting the city.

Princess Grace was born an American, and all three of her children (including the reigning Prince) grew up speaking English among other languages. The current princess consort of Monaco, Princess Charlene, is a native English speaker, having been born a Rhodesian in what is now Zimbabwe.

== Occitan ==
Occitan (Lenga d'òc) has also traditionally been spoken in Monaco, particularly when it covered a larger geographical territory, but is rarely used today.

== Other ==
Intemelio is a Ligurian dialect spoken historically from the Principality of Monaco to the Italian comune of Imperia.

== See also ==
- Outline of Monaco
- History of Monaco
- Constitution of Monaco
