= Energy in Monaco =

Energy in Monaco describes energy production, consumption and importation in the Principality of Monaco.

Monaco has no domestic sources of fossil fuels and relies entirely on imports of electricity, gas and fuels from France. Monaco's sole national power company is Société Monégasque de l'Electricité et du Gaz (SMEG, Monegasque Electricity and Gas Company), which operates the country's electric and gas grid and provides related services. SMEG is 60% owned by Engie, 20% by the State of Monaco, 15% by EDF, and the rest by private investors. Although the country imports its gas and electricity from France, it operates a waste-to-energy district heating and seawater pumping plant in Fontvieille called seaWergie which provides heating and cooling to homes and businesses in the quartier.

Due to this importation and small size, key statistics do not list Monaco as separate country in carbon dioxide emissions. Instead the principality include its emissions in France's statistics. In 2018, the country used around 536,000 MWh of electricity, of which a majority of it was used tertiary services.

== History ==
The first and later sole electric plant was a gas-fired power plant built by the casino operator SBM at base of Fort Antoine in Monaco-Ville. It was later decommissioned in 1952 in agreement with France, over the nationalisation of the local Niçoise gas company EELV to create Gaz de France.

== Kyoto Protocol ==
In December 2007 Monaco had underlined but not ratified the Kyoto Protocol. In 2008 Monaco was - 4% from its Kyoto Protocol emission targets.

According to the National greenhouse gas inventory data for the period 1990–2006 UNFCCC 17 November 2008 page 16 the emissions change from 1990 to 2006 in Monaco was -13.1% as following (Gg CO_{2} equivalent):

- 1990: 108
- 1995: 115
- 2000: 120
- 2005: 104
- 2006: 94

== Monaco Declaration ==
On 30 January 2009 ocean scientists expressed their concern in Monaco about global warming and its consequences for the oceans. 150 leading scientists appealed to decision makers in "the Monaco Declaration" to restrict CO_{2} emissions. Today's emissions could have dramatic consequences in the stocks of fish in a few decades, which would influence significantly both ocean biodiversity and also global food supply.
