= Zoological Garden of Monaco =

Zoo in Monaco

- Interactive map of Zoological Garden of Monaco
- 43°43′52.62″N 7°25′5.83″E
- Date opened: 1954
- Land area: 1 hectare (2.5 acres)
- No. of animals: 300
- No. of species: 60

The Jardin Animalier de Monaco is a zoo located on the Esplanade Rainer III, in Monaco's Fontvieille ward, on the southern side of the Rock of Monaco. It was established by Rainier III, Prince of Monaco in 1954. Almost 300 animals representing some 60 different species are held in the zoo.

The zoo is one hectare in size, and is set over four levels on the Rock of Monaco. None of the animals in the zoo were purchased; all of the animals in the zoo were given as donations, adopted from circuses, rescued as abandoned animals, or were seized by customs. Five animals came to the zoo after the 2009 closure of the zoo at Saint-Jean-Cap-Ferrat. In 2022, the zoo adopted several exotic animals from a local animal shelter, including a peacock, a blue-fronted amazon, and two leopard geckos.

The zoo formerly contained leopards, but these were released into the wild due to the efforts of campaigner Virginia McKenna, founder of the Born Free Foundation. The two leopards, Pitou and Sirius, had been kept in a five-meter enclosure with a concrete floor. McKenna had previously visited Monaco nine times in an attempt to petition Prince Rainier for the animal's release, she was finally granted a royal audience with Prince Albert after his ascension to the Monegasque throne in 2005. Albert agreed to release the leopards to Born Free, with a promise to release the camel and hippo in the zoo at a later date. Albert also promised to turn the Zoological Gardens into a petting zoo.

In August 2018, the garden temporarily closed do to an infestation of agave weevils. Over five tons of plants had to be incinerated, and the rock walls had to be cleaned. The garden re-opened in June 2019.
