= Annales monégasques =

- Discipline: Monégasque history
- Language: English

Publication details
- History: 1977-present
- Frequency: Annual

Standard abbreviations
- ISO 4: Ann. Monég.

Indexing
- ISSN: 0257-960X

Annales monégasques is a journal of Monégasque history.

== History ==
The journal was established in 1977 by Franck Biancheri, the archivist of the Prince's Palace of Monaco. The first issue included articles on varied topics like La Condamine in the Middle Ages, Monaco-born music theorist Honoré Langlé, the Hymne Monégasque.

By 2012, the new editor, Thomas Fouilleron, the new archivist of the Prince's Palace of Monaco, suggested he wanted to digitalize past issues.

The 39th issue, published on November 27, 2015, includes articles about the relationship between the House of Grimaldi and the House of Romanov, the correspondence between Prince Pierre, Duke of Valentinois and author Marcel Proust, the friendship between Albert I, Prince of Monaco and composer Jules Massenet, and Alexandre Dumas's novel about Catherine Charlotte de Gramont, the wife of Louis I, Prince of Monaco.
