= Sport in Monaco =

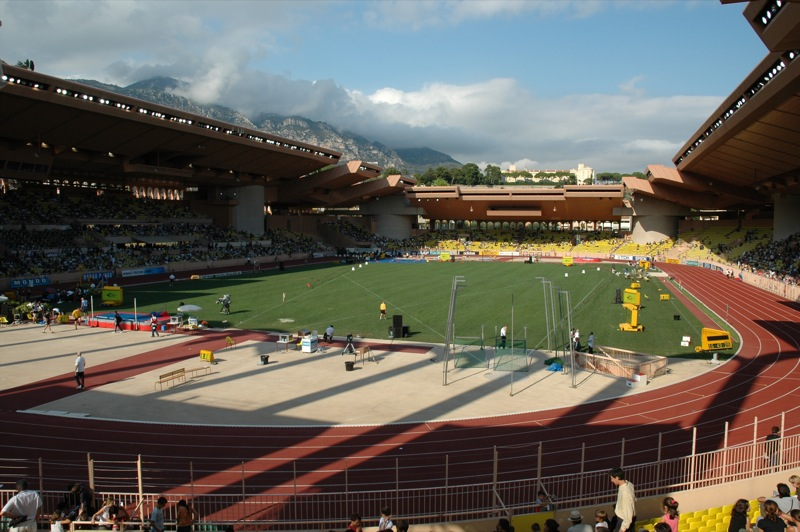
Stade Louis II during the 2005 Herculis track and field event.

Sport in Monaco form a significant role in the culture of Monaco. The biggest professional sports are association football, motorsports, basketball, and track and field. Other sports are also participated in by athletes and teams.

== Motorsports ==
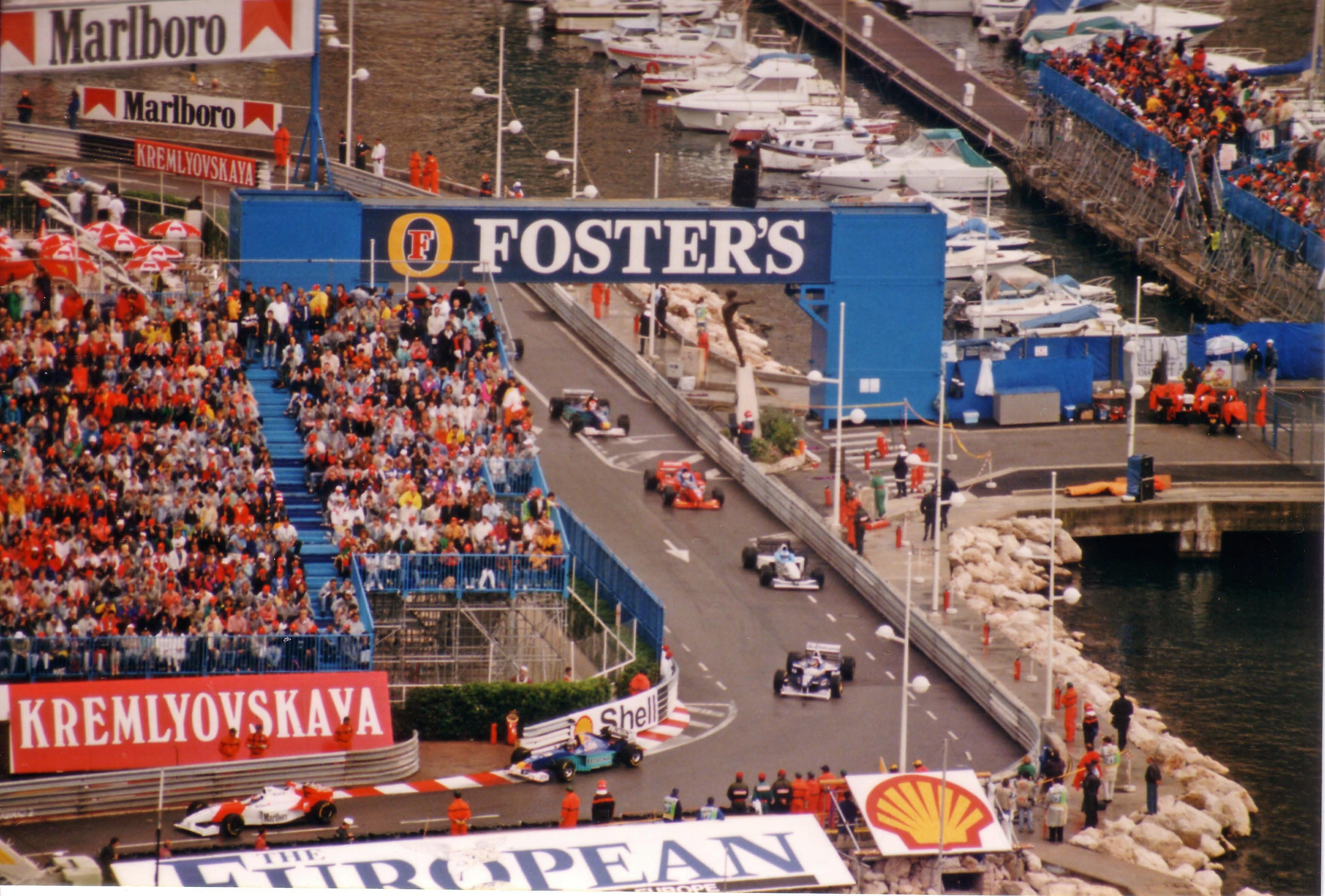
Formation lap of the 1996 Monaco Grand Prix.

The highest-profile annual event in the country is the Monaco Grand Prix, which is held on the temporary Circuit de Monaco in Monte Carlo. The race was founded in 1929 and has been on the Formula One calendar since the first season in 1950.

Other races also held on the circuit include Formula 2, Formula 3, the Monaco ePrix, Formula Regional Europe, Porsche Supercup, the Historic Grand Prix of Monaco, and in the past, Formula Renault.

Since 1911, the ending portions of the Monte Carlo Rally has been held in the principality. The rally has been on the World Rally Championship calendar for most years and was on the International Rally Championship calendar. In the 21st century, the ending portions have usually been the final ceremonies and not any special stages, but the 2007, 2008, and 2026 editions have included a stage in Monaco.

In 2014, Monaco inaugurated the Solar1 Monte Carlo Cup, a series of ocean races exclusively for solar-powered boats.

== Association football ==
The biggest sports club in Monaco is the men's association football team AS Monaco FC, which plays in the French football league system, usually at its highest tier Ligue 1 and are often seen in UEFA club tournaments as well, up to and including the UEFA Champions League. The team plays at the Stade Louis II.

The biggest women's association football club is AS Monaco FF, which also plays in the French system. As of the 2025–26 season, they play in the women's tier 3, Division 3 Féminine.

Domestic competitions on amateur level are managed by the Monégasque Football Federation, which arrange various club tournaments, the biggest of which is the Challenge Prince Rainier III. They also manage the Monaco national football team; as of March 2026, the national team last played a known match in 2017, and they only played in non-FIFA international football. The federation is not a member of UEFA or FIFA. While they are a member of the IOC, they are not known to have entered any IOC-related football tournaments.

The UEFA Super Cup, a one-off match contested between the winners of UEFA Champions League and UEFA Europa League, was held in Monaco annually from 1999 to 2012.

== Basketball ==
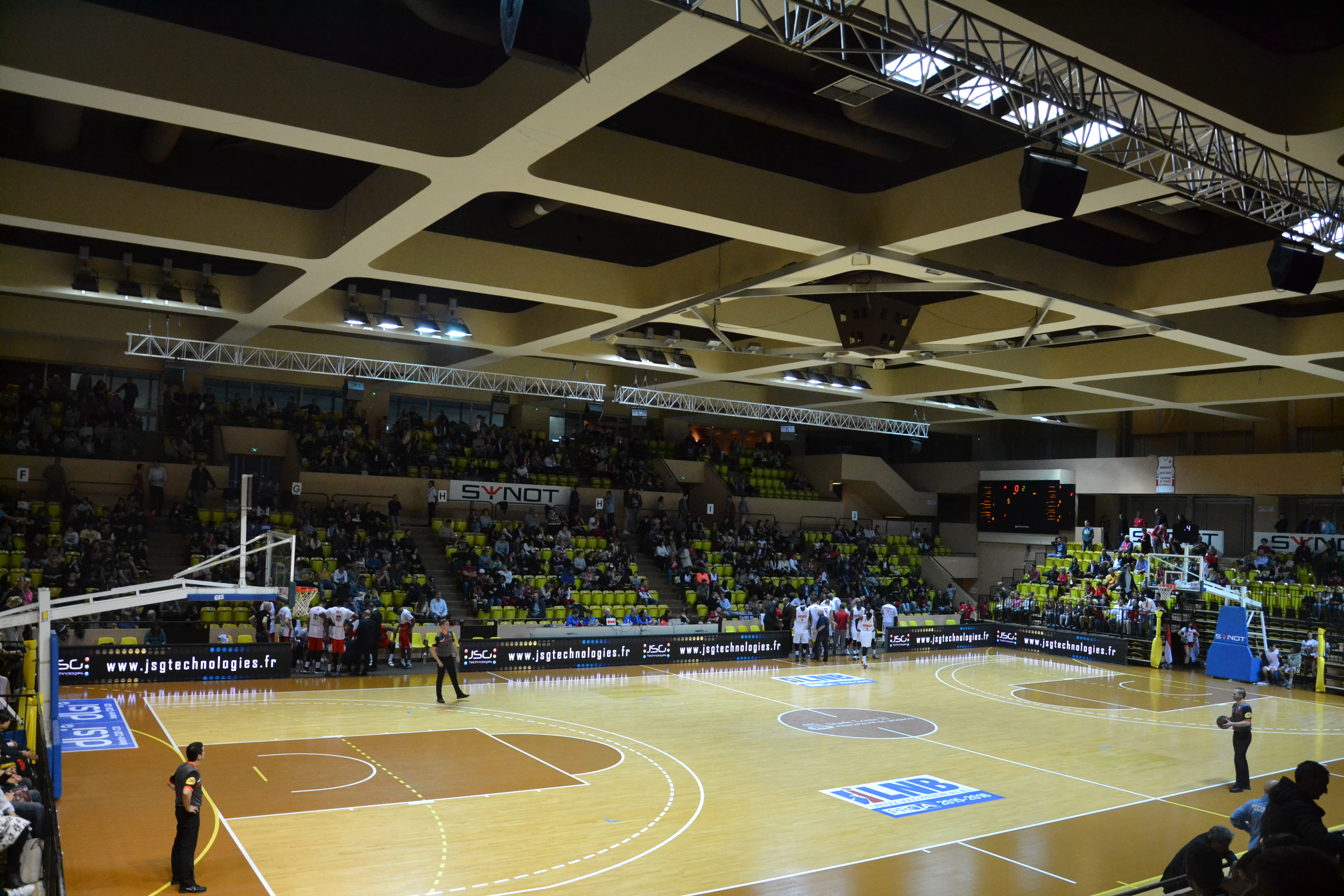
The Stade Gaston Médecin set up for an LNB Élite match in 2016.

AS Monaco Basket plays in the EuroLeague, which is the biggest European club tournament, and in the LNB Élite, which is the biggest French league. They play their matches in the Salle Gaston Médecin.

== Athletics ==
Stade Louis II hosts the annual Diamond League event Herculis in track and field. Monaco also forms part of the Monaco Marathon, the only marathon in the world to pass through three countries, as well as an Ironman 70.3 triathlon race.

The international governing body of World Athletics (WA) is headquartered in Monaco.

== Boxing ==
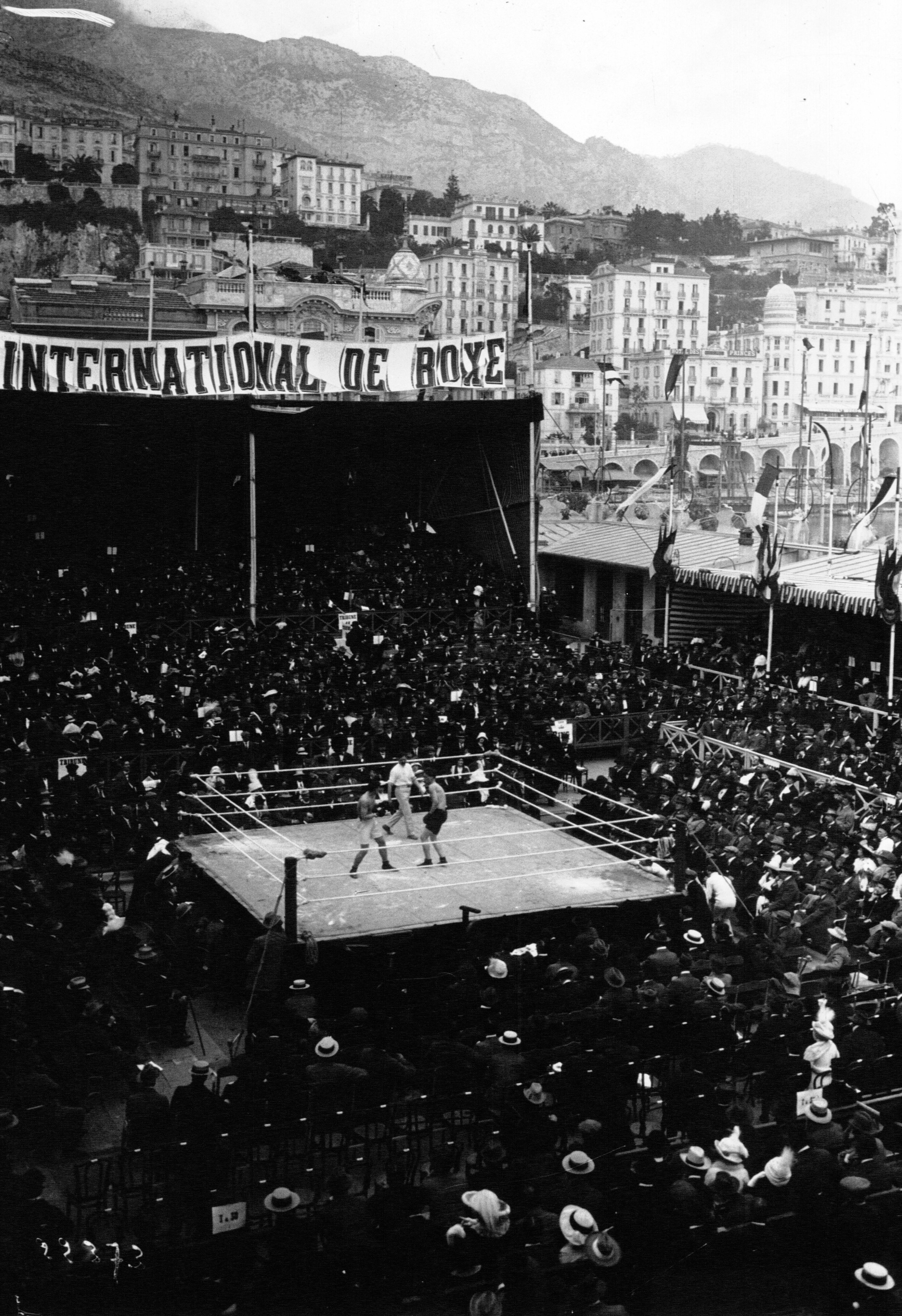
Georges Carpentier versus Jim Sullivan in 1912.

Due its position as a tourist and gambling centre, Monaco has staged major professional boxing world title and non-title fights from time to time. Those include the Carlos Monzon versus Nino Benvenuti rematch, Monzon's rematch with Emile Griffith, Monzon's two classic fights with Rodrigo Valdez, Davey Moore versus Wilfredo Benitez, the double knockout-ending classic between Lee Roy Murphy and Chisanda Mutti, and Julio César Chávez Sr. versus Rocky Lockridge.

== Cycling ==
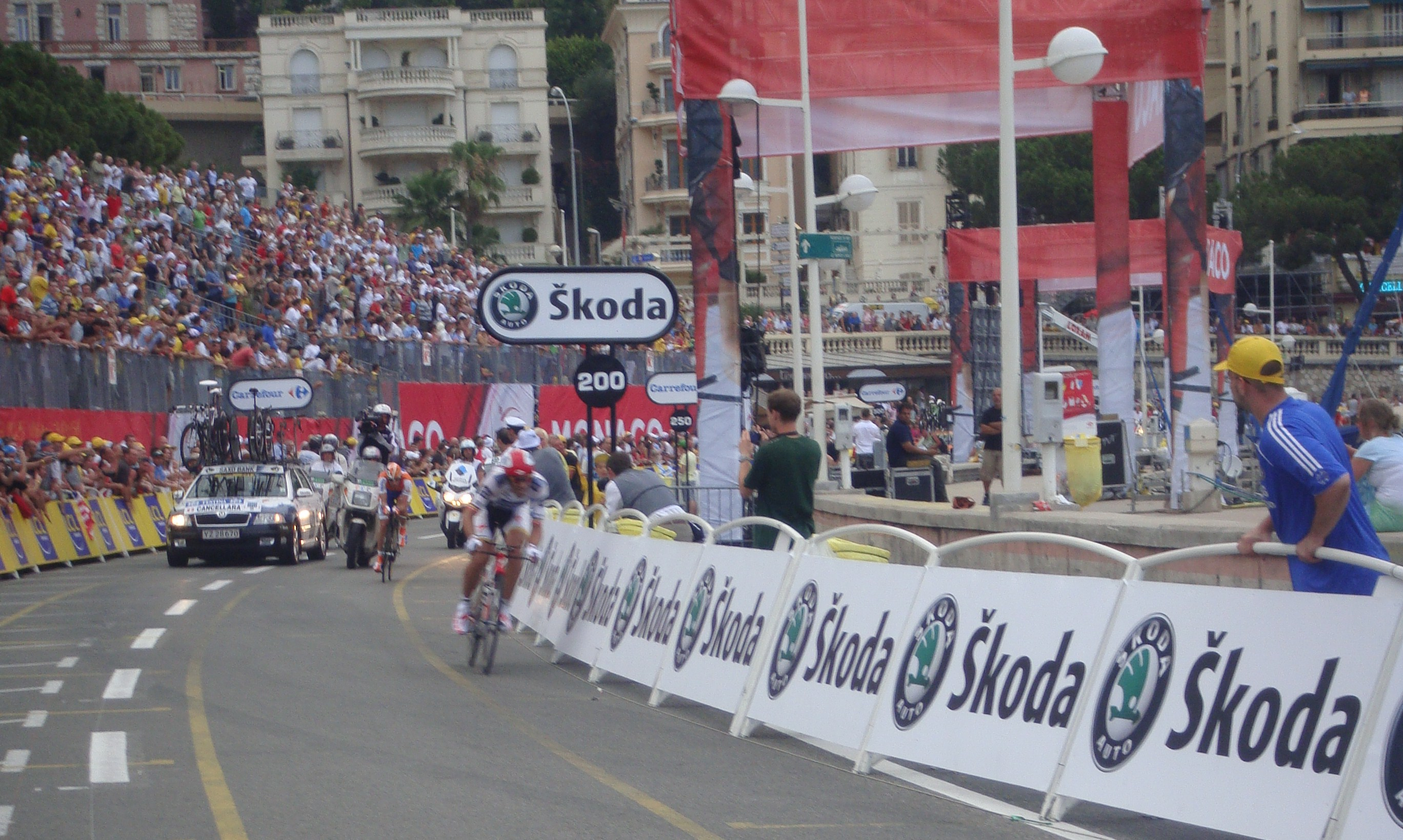
Fabian Cancellara in Monaco during stage 1 of the 2009 Tour de France.

Monaco has been part of Tour de France stages and of the 1966 Giro d'Italia.

== Rugby ==
The Monaco national rugby union team is a full member of World Rugby. However, as of March 2026, their recentmost known official 15-a-side match in a significant tournament was in the 2008–2010 European Nations Cup Third Division. Their rugby sevens team has been more active in the time since, having among other things entered the 2022 Rugby Europe Sevens Conference.

== Multi-sports events ==
Monaco is a member of the International Olympic Committee and competes in the Olympics, Youth Olympic Games, Mediterranean Games, European Games, and the Games of the Small States of Europe.

They have yet to win a sporting medal at the Olympic Games, but have had some success in smaller events, including a bronze in bobsleigh at the 2012 Winter Youth Olympics and 5 medals (including 1 gold) in the Mediterranean Games.

== Other sports ==
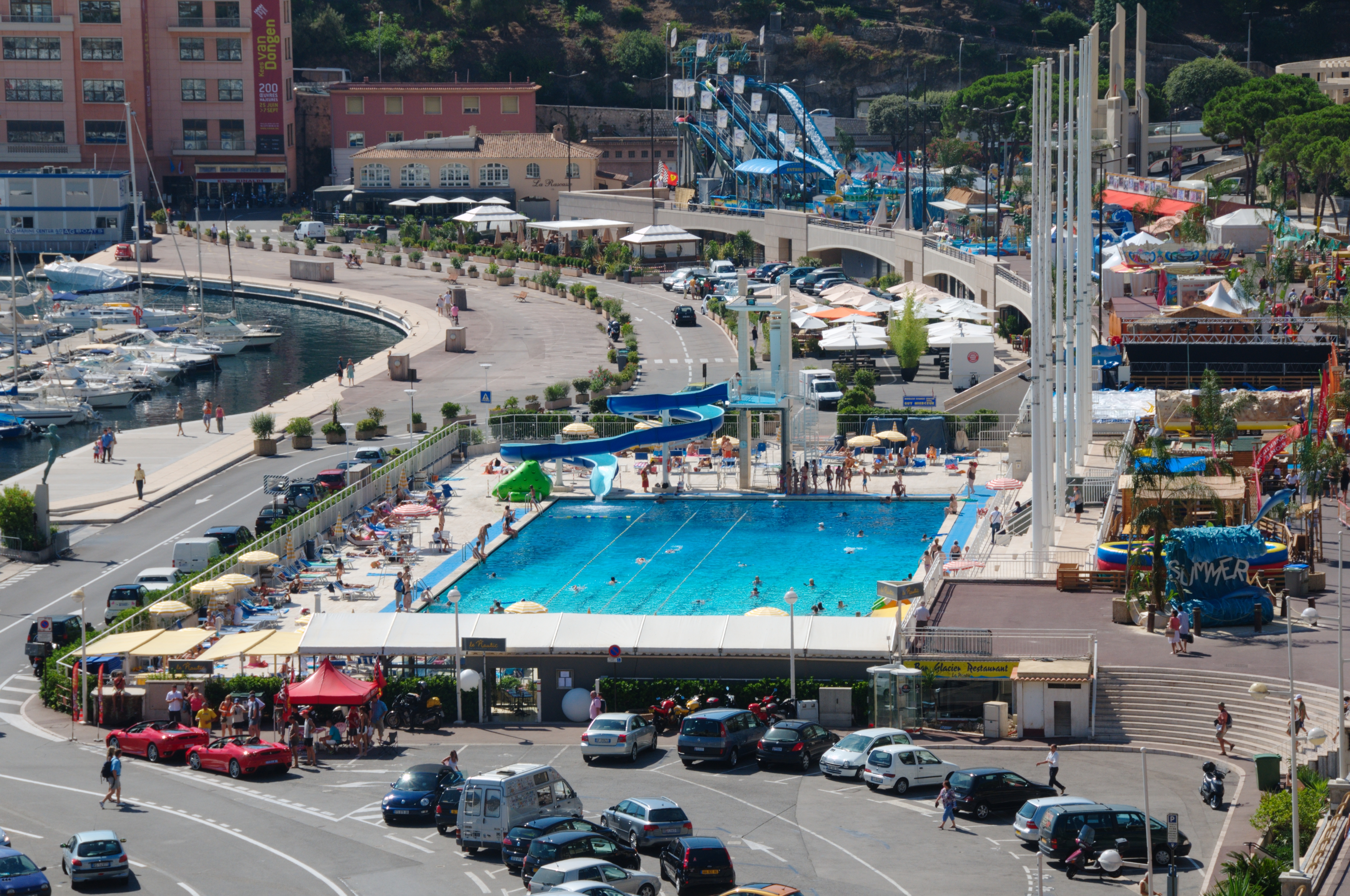
Nautical Stadium in 2008.

The Rainier III Nautical Stadium in the Port Hercules district consists of a heated saltwater outdoor Olympic-size swimming pool, diving boards and a slide. The pool is converted into an ice rink from December to March.

== Geographical factors ==
Due to the very small size of the country, it often relies on its bordering country France to help host sports events. The Monte Carlo Rally takes place almost entirely in the southern French Alps. The domestic association football tournaments play most of their matches at pitches in the French village of Cap-d'Ail down the street from Stade Louis II, and at the Stade de Moneghetti in the uphill transborder agglomeration French town of Beausoleil. Stade de Moneghetti also hosted volleyball during the 2007 Games of the Small States of Europe, which was otherwise hosted by Monaco.

The Stade Louis II is the only regulation size field for association football and for track and field in the country.

== Significant athletes ==
- Louis Chiron, winner of various Grands Prix in the 1930's and a 1950's Formula One driver.
- Charles Leclerc, Formula One driver and one-time Formula 2 champion.
- Daniel Elena, co-driver for Sebastien Loeb and 9-time World Rally Champion.
- Xiaoxin Yang, gold medallist in table tennis at the Mediterranean Games and silver medallist at the European Games.
