= Demographics of Monaco =

- Population: 38,367 (2023)
- Density: 18,469.31 / sq. km.
- Growth rate: 2.25% (2012–13)
- Birth rate: 13.1 (2015)
- Death rate: 10.4 (2015)
- Life expectancy: 84.7 (2011–13)
- Fertility rate: 2.11 (2023)
- Immigrant share: 70.2% (2024)

Age structure
- 0–14 years: ▲13.8% (2025 est.)
- 15–64 years: ▼50.2% (2025 est.)
- 65 and over: ▼36% (2025 est.)

This is a demography of the population of Monaco, including population density, ethnicity, education level, health of the populace, economic status, religious affiliations and other aspects of the population.

In 1995, Monaco's population was estimated at 30,744, with an estimated average growth rate of 0.59%. Monaco-Ville has a population of 1,151.

French is the official language; Italian, English, and Monégasque also are spoken. The literacy rate is 99%. Roman Catholicism is the official religion, with freedom of other religions guaranteed by the constitution.

== Demographic statistics ==
	Average population	Live births	Deaths	Natural change	Crude birth rate (per 1000)	Crude death rate (per 1000)	Natural change (per 1000)
1991		729	621	108			
1992		802	579	223			
1993		760	556	204			
1994		831	599	232			
1995		830	560	270			
1996		788	531	257			
1997		713	485	228			
1998		681	538	143			
1999		733	559	174			
2000	32,020	760	547	213	23.7	17.1	6.7
2001		748	636	112			
2002		771	564	207			
2003		842	617	225			
2004		825	525	300			
2005		894	601	293			
2006		880	535	345			
2007		927	502	425			
2008	35,352	970	545	425	27.4	15.4	12.0
2009	35,400	1,008	554	454	28.5	15.6	12.8
2010	35,400	961	535	426	27.1	15.1	12.0
2011	35,650	1,028	499	529	28.8	14.0	14.8
2012	36,100	979	529	450	27.1	14.7	12.5
2013	36,900	992	567	425	26.9	15.4	11.5
2014	37,600	974	524	450	25.9	13.9	12.0
2015	38,200	1,067	595	472	27.9	15.6	12.4
2016	37,550	943	503	440	25.1	13.4	11.7
2017	38,350	950	494	456	24.8	12.9	11.9
2018	38,300	980	522	458	25.6	13.6	12.0
2019	38,150	939	528	411	24.6	13.8	10.8
2020	38,350	912	534	378	23.8	13.9	9.9
2021	39,100	978	607	371	25.0	15.5	9.5
2022	39,050	855	528	327	21.9	13.5	8.4
2023	38,367	805	536	269	21.0	14.0	7.0
2024	38,423	716	505	211	18.6	13.1	5.5
2025	38,857	742	542	200	19.1	13.9	5.2

=== Structure of the population ===
Population by Sex and Age Group (Census 09.VI.2008) (Data refer to resident population only.) (Figures for male and female population do not add up to the figure for total population, because they exclude 119 persons of unknown sex.):

Age group	Male	Female	Total	%
Total	15 076	15 914	31 109	100
0–4	577	557	1 134	3.65
5–9	706	724	1 430	4.60
10–14	727	674	1 401	4.50
15–19	724	674	1 398	4.49
20–24	647	601	1 248	4.01
25–29	638	667	1 305	4.19
30–34	751	766	1 514	4.87
35–39	1 003	1 119	2 122	6.82
40–44	1 163	1 179	2 342	7.53
45–49	1 194	1 165	2 359	7.58
50–54	1 128	1 090	2 218	7.13
55–59	1 120	1 097	2 217	7.13
60–64	1 134	1 203	2 337	7.51
65-69	945	1 015	1 960	6.30
70-74	801	847	1 648	5.30
75+	1 530	2 228	3 758	12.08
Age group	Male	Female	Total	Percent
0–14	2 010	1 955	3 965	12.75
15–64	9 502	9 561	19 063	61.28
65+	3 276	4 090	7 366	23.68
unknown	288	308	715	2.30

Population by Sex and Age Group (Census 07.VI.2016) (Data refer to resident population.):

Age group	Male	Female	Total	%
Total	18 240	19 068	37 308	100
0–4	785	786	1 571	4.21
5–9	699	682	1 381	3.70
10–14	719	687	1 406	3.77
15–19	834	781	1 615	4.33
20–24	768	718	1 486	3.98
25–29	761	704	1 465	3.93
30–34	771	756	1 526	4.09
35–39	752	883	1 635	4.38
40–44	811	918	1 730	4.64
45–49	1 030	1 095	2 125	5.70
50–54	1 245	1 268	2 513	6.74
55–59	1 383	1 392	2 775	7.44
60–64	1 247	1 176	2 423	6.49
65-69	1 241	1 203	2 445	6.55
70-74	1 126	1 158	2 284	6.12
75-79	1 119	1 111	2 230	5.98
80-84	957	1 086	2 043	5.48
85-89	760	909	1 668	4.47
90-94	551	713	1 264	3.39
95-99	368	523	891	2.39
100+	314	518	832	2.23
Age group	Male	Female	Total	Percent
0–14	2 203	2 155	4 358	11.68
15–64	9 601	9 692	19 293	51.71
65+	6 436	7 221	13 657	36.61

Historical populations
Year	Pop.	±% p.a.
1960	22,452	—
1970	23,484	+0.45%
1980	26,745	+1.31%
1990	29,972	+1.15%
2000	32,020	+0.66%
2008	35,352	+1.25%
2016	37,308	+0.68%
2018	38,300	+1.32%
2022	39,050	+0.49%
2024	38,423	−0.81%
Source: IMSEE

The following demographic statistics are from the CIA World Factbook, unless otherwise indicated.

Age structure:
0-14 years: 12.3% (male 1,930/ female 1,841)
15-64 years: 60.8% (male 9,317/ female 9,249)
65 years and over: 26.9% (male 3,640/ female 4,562) (2012 estimate), 36% (2022 World Population Data Sheet estimate)

Population growth rate: −0.066% (2012 estimate)

Birth rate: 6.85 births/1,000 population (2012 estimate)

Fertility Rate:

Monagesque: 2.0 births per woman (2023-2025)

Death rate: 8.52 deaths/1,000 population (2007 estimate)

Net migration rate: 1.02 migrants/1,000 population (2007 estimate)

Sex ratio:
at birth: 1.04 male(s)/female
under 15 years: 1.05 male(s)/female
15-64 years: 1 male(s)/female
65 years and over: 0.81 male(s)/female
total population: 0.95 male(s)/female (2012 estimate)

Infant mortality rate: 1.8 deaths/1,000 live births (2012 estimate)

Life expectancy at birth (2023 estimate):
total: 89.6 years (highest in the world)
male: 85.8 years (highest in the world)
female: 93.6 years (highest in the world)

Total fertility rate: 1.52 children born/woman in 2018

Nationality:
noun: Monegasque(s) or Monacan(s)
adjective: Monegasque or Monacan

Ethnic groups: French (47%), Monegasque (16%), Italian (16%), other (21%)

Religions: Roman Catholic (90%), other (10%)

Languages: French (official), English, Italian, Monegasque

Literacy:
definition: NA
total population: 99%
male: 99%
female: 99% (2003 estimate)
