= Chapelle de la Visitation, Monaco-Ville =

Roman Catholic chapel in Monaco-Ville, Monaco

Coordinates: 43°43′53.01″N 7°25′31.87″E

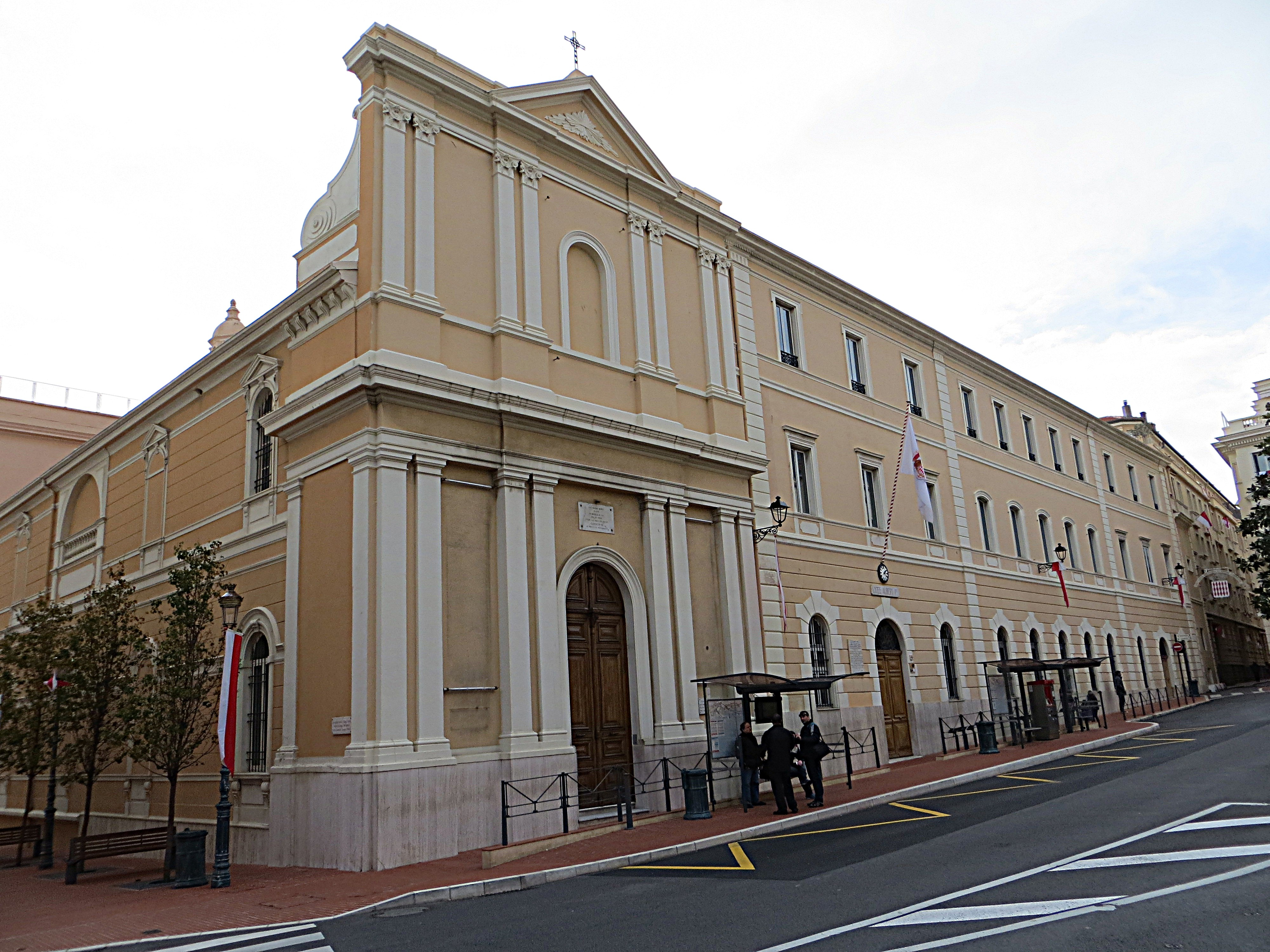
The Chapelle de la Visitation in January 2015

The Museum of the Chapel of Visitation (French: Museé de la Chapelle de la Visitation) is an art museum and Roman Catholic chapel in the Monaco-Ville ward of Monaco. The baroque chapel dates from the 17th-century.

From 1995, the museum was the home of the Barbara-Piasecka Johnson Collection, a collection of Old Master paintings collected by Barbara Piasecka Johnson. The collection was removed from the chapel in May 2014 in preparation for its eventual sale at Christie's auction house in July 2014.
