= Catholic Church in Monaco =

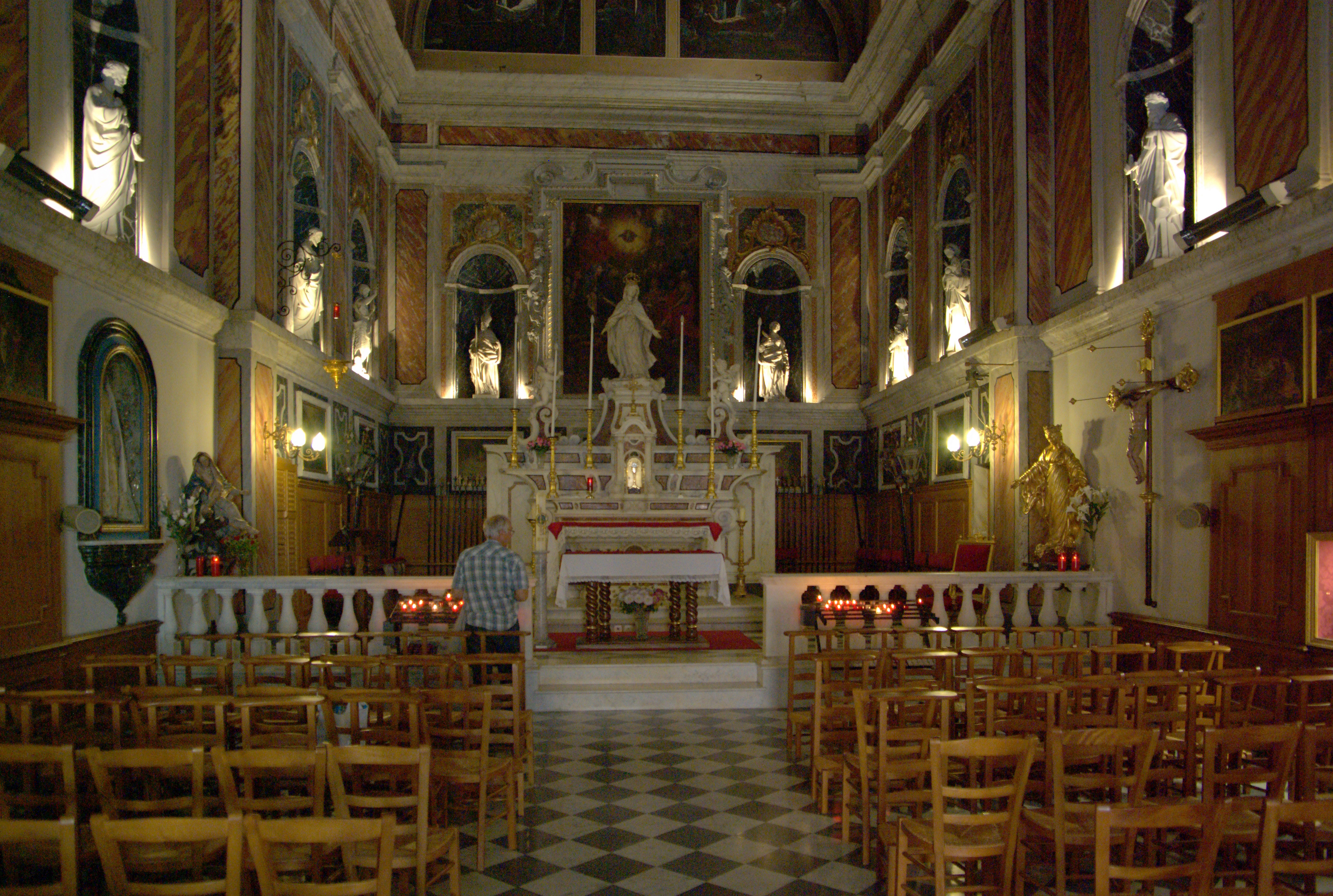
Chapel of the Penitents, Monaco

The Roman Catholic Church in Monaco is part of the worldwide Roman Catholic Church, under the spiritual leadership of the Pope in Rome.

The country forms a single archdiocese: the Roman Catholic Archdiocese of Monaco, which is part of the Roman Catholic Church in France since the beginning of its history. Per the Constitution of Monaco (Art. 9) Roman Catholicism is the official church of Monaco, and is the majority religion; religious freedom is also guaranteed by the constitution. In 2023, the country was scored 4 out of 4 for religious freedom.

Cathedral of Our Lady Immaculate is the cathedral of the Monaco archdiocese. Other Roman Catholic churches include the Saint Charles Church, Church St. Devote, Saint Martin Church, and Saint Nicholas Church. Roman Catholic chapels include the Chapel of Mercy, Chapel of the Sacred Heart, and the Carmelite Chapel. The former Chapel of Visitation is now an art museum.

In 2020, there were 32,000 Roman Catholics in Monaco (83.16% of the population); there were 24 priests and 11 nuns serving across 6 parishes.

Other estimates put the Roman Catholic population at 90%; the remainder of the country is made up of Jews (3%), Protestants (2%) and Russian Orthodox (1%) with small numbers of Greek Orthodox, Muslims and others.

Caritas Monaco is a Roman Catholic charity organisation supporting poor and vulnerable people in Monaco and raising funds for the victims of disasters and emergencies around the world.
