= Louis Notari =

Monégasque poet, writer of the national anthem (1879–1961)

Louis Notari (Monaco, 1879–1961) was a Monégasque poet, who was the pioneer of Monégasque literature. He wrote in the French and Monégasque languages.

== Principal writings ==
He wrote in 1931 the final version of the text of the Monaco national anthem and he is considered as the first writer in Monégasque; before him, there was just oral literature. He wrote the lyrics to U Campanin de San Niculau and also three books:

- A legenda de Santa Devota/Santa Devota (1927) -about the legend of Saint Devota
- Bülüghe munegasche (1941)
- Quelques notes sur les traditions de Monaco (1960)

Notari's writing in Monégasque has led to a veritable flowering of literature published in the language. A grammar and a dictionary by Louis Frolla and numerous other works, including by Georges Franzi, Louis Barral and Suzanne Simone (dictionary) Louis Canis, Jules Soccal, Lazare Sauvaigo and Robert Buisson, combine to allow this small country's own language to take its visible and permanent place among the other Romance languages.

However, while a substantial proportion of Notari's work was religious in inspiration, Monégasque is probably unique among the Romance languages in that it possesses, as yet, no Bible translation.

== Former fascist sympathies ==
In his researches in Monégasque identity, Notari got in touch in the 1930s with Italian academics sustaining regional languages for a Latin federation pledged to the fascist Italian government. In this way, he wrote a few poems celebrating Benito Mussolini.

In the post-War era, however, any fascist sympathies which Notari may once have held were not stressed.

== Personal legacy ==
The decision by the late Prince Rainier III to sponsor Monégasque teachers in local schools owed much to the groundwork in promoting Monégasque which writers such as Notari and others laid. Louis Notari was also prominent in civil engineering in the Principality, and was noted for his work on Monaco's renowned exotic garden, which annually hosts large numbers of visitors from many countries.

His daughter Roxane became the first woman elected to the National Council in 1963.

A street in the suburb of La Condamine, Monaco, is named after Louis Notari. A library, the Bibliothèque Louis Notari, which serves as the national copyright library for Monaco, is also named after him.
