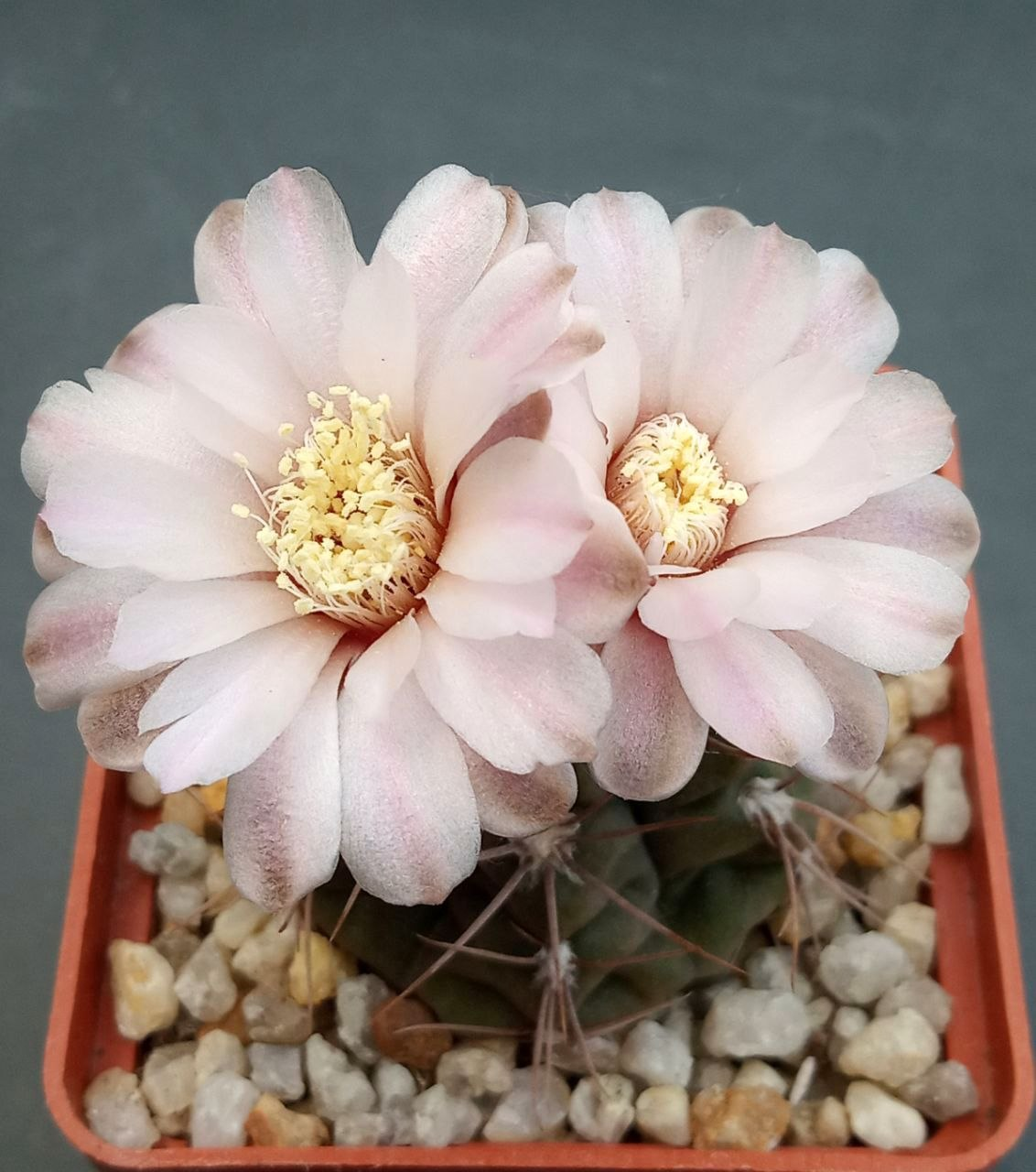

Conservation status
- Least Concern (IUCN 3.1)

Scientific classification
- Kingdom: Plantae
- Clade: Tracheophytes
- Clade: Angiosperms
- Clade: Eudicots
- Order: Caryophyllales
- Family: Cactaceae
- Subfamily: Cactoideae
- Genus: Gymnocalycium
- Species: G. kroenleinii

Binomial name
- Gymnocalycium kroenleinii R.Kiesling, Rausch & O.Ferrari 2000

Synonyms
- Gymnocalycium kroenleinii subsp. funettae Mereg. 2014

= Gymnocalycium kroenleinii =

Species of cactus

Gymnocalycium kroenleinii is a species of cactus in the genus Gymnocalycium, endemic to Argentina.

== Description ==
Gymnocalycium kroenleinii is a solitary-growing cactus with light green stems with brownish-pink undertones, flattened, and spherical in shape, reaching up to 6 centimeters in diameter. It also develops a short, turnip-like root. Each stem has 8-10 ribs, which are notched and divided into prominent, 7 mm-long bumps that resemble chin-like protrusions. The spines of G. kroenleinii are awl-shaped and irregularly curved, with a brown-gray to brown coloration at the base. Typically, there is a single central spine that can grow up to 2 centimeters long, although it may be absent in some cases. The 7-9 radial spines (sometimes 3 or more) are adjacent to the protruding bumps and can reach lengths of up to 1.7 centimeters. One spine usually points downwards and is slightly longer than the others, which point sideways.

The flowers of G. kroenleinii are short, broad, and funnel-shaped, typically pink or whitish in color, and reach lengths and diameters of up to 3 centimeters. The stamens are pink, while the style and stigmas are white. The pericarpel is conical in shape, measuring 7 mm long and 5 mm wide. The fruits are spherical, slightly tapered, and range in color from violet to pinkish-gray, with diameters of up to 1.2 centimeters. They open vertically, revealing pot-shaped, matte black seeds with a large hilum, measuring 1.2-1.4 mm long and 1.0-1.2 mm thick. G. kroenleinii can only be propagated through seed, as it does not produce offsets.

== Distribution ==
G. kroenleinii is distributed in the Argentine province of La Rioja, specifically in the Sierra de Malanzán mountain range, at an altitude of approximately 1250-1450 meters, where it grows on rocky terrain.

== Taxonomy ==
Gymnocalycium kroenleinii was first described in 2000 by Roberto Kiesling, Walter Rausch, and Omar Ferrari. The specific epithet "kroenleinii" honors Marcel Kroenlein, the long-time director of the Jardin Exotique de Monaco.
