= Louis Notari Library =

National library of Monaco

Coordinates: 43.7350°N 7.4207°E

The Louis Notari Library (French: Bibliothèque Louis Notari) is the National library of Monaco, founded by Prince Albert I in 1909.

It has been the legal deposit and copyright library for Monaco since 1925. It has more than 400,000 books.

Since 1980, it is named for Monegasque writer Louis Notari, author of the first publication in the Monegasque language. (Note: A legenda de Santa Devota (1927))

The collections include the literary archives of Louis Notari, donated in 2003, and, since 2010, the private archives of the scholar Louis Canis (Note: Famously authored Notre passé (1963)) (1891-1973).

== See also ==
- Princess Grace Irish Library
- Les Rencontres Philosophiques de Monaco
- Oceanographic Museum of Monaco
- Médiathèque Caroline (Caroline Media Library)
