= Geology of Monaco =

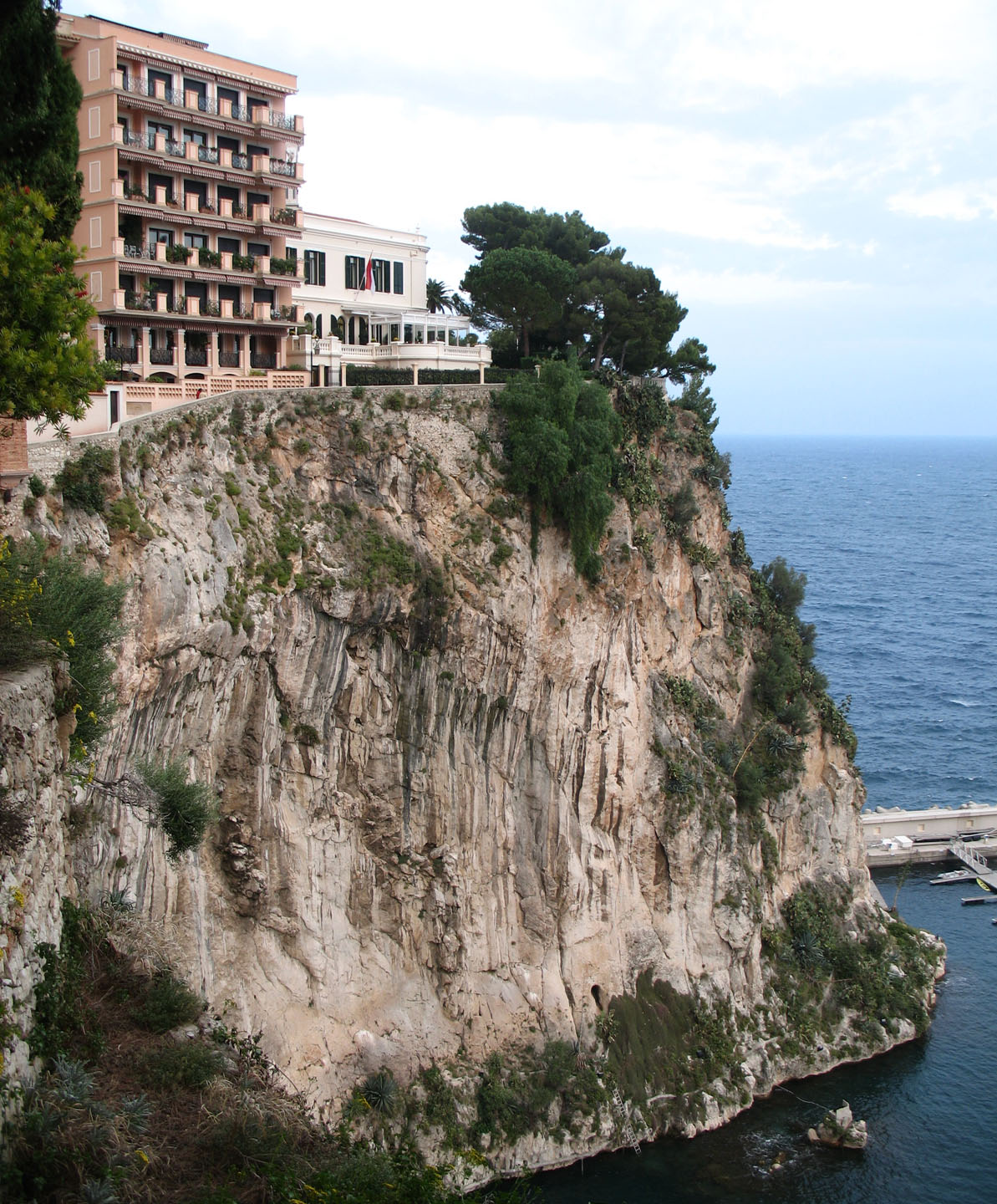
Cliff of Upper Jurassic (Kimmeridgian-Tithonian) sedimentary rock at Ruelle Sainte-Barbe, southern Monaco

The geology of Monaco is closely related to the end of the Western Alps, forming the small country's steep corniche coastline. During the last 2.5 million years of the Quaternary high sea levels between glaciations formed erosion terraces and left behind coastal sediment deposits. Beach sands are mixed with frost chippings and other cold-weather remnants of the glacial period and preserve large mammal remains and archaeological remains of early humans in the Gîte des Moulins Cave and the Jardin Exotique. Monaco hosts the International Hydrographic Organization.
