= Charles Albrecht =

Monégasque composer (1817–1895)

Charles Christian Albrecht (1817–1895) was a composer who wrote the music for "Hymne Monégasque," the national anthem of Monaco, based on a previous version by Théophile Bellando de Castro. Lyrics were later added by Louis Notari.

Albrecht had previously served as conductor of the Cercle des Etrangers Orchestre.
