= Museum of Prehistoric Anthropology =

Museum in Monaco

Coordinates: 43°43′55″N 7°24′50″E

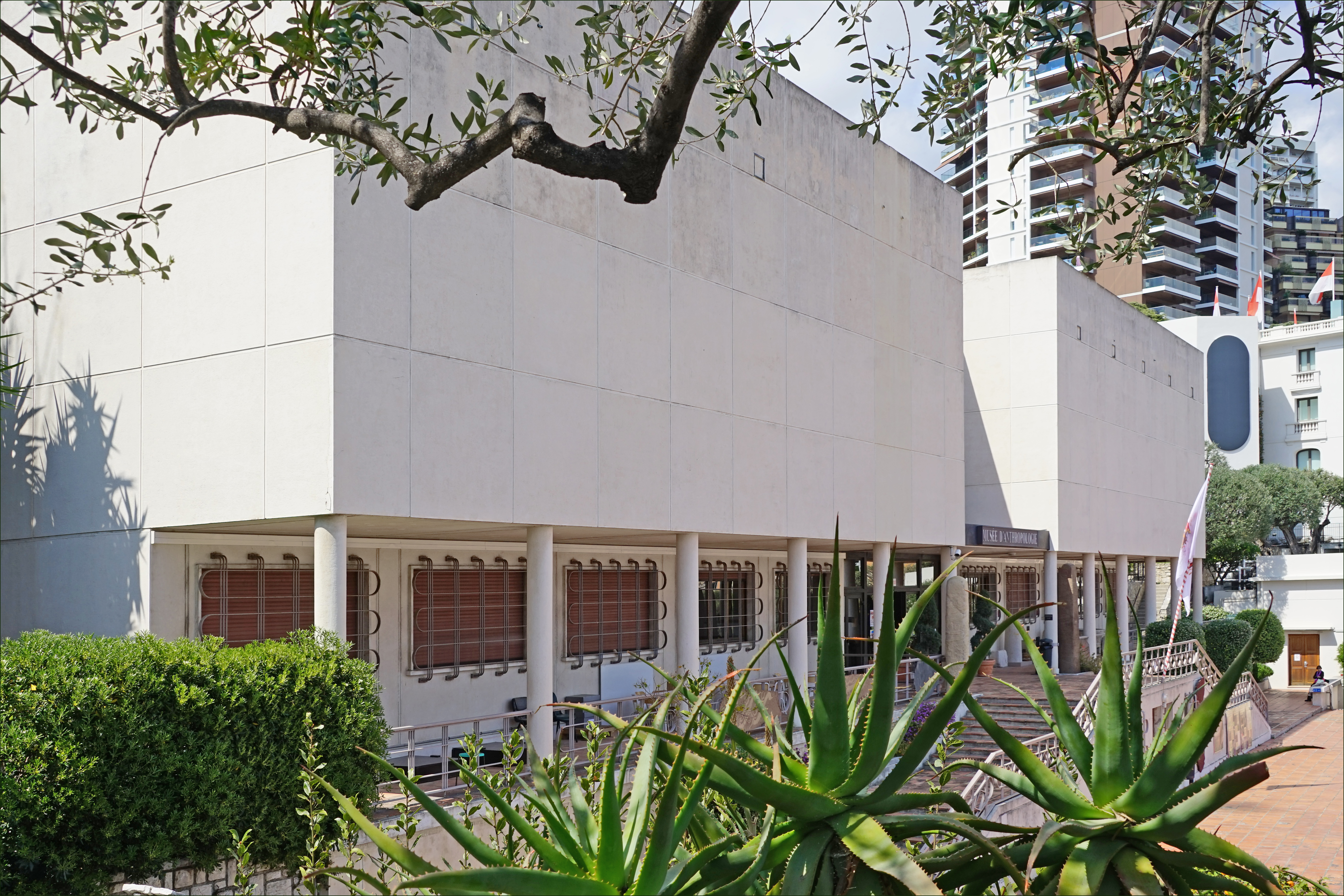
Museum of Prehistoric Anthropology

The Museum of Prehistoric Anthropology (French: Musée d'anthropologie préhistorique de Monaco; Monegasque: Müseu d’Antrupulugia Preisto̍rica de Mu̍negu) is located within the Jardin Exotique de Monaco. It was opened in 1902 and contains a collection of fossils and other excavated artifacts relating to the prehistory of Monaco and areas nearby.

The museum is home to the mummy of an Egyptian woman named Merit who died around 300BC.

== History ==
The Museum of Prehistoric Anthropology was founded in 1902 by Prince Albert I of Monaco, becoming the principality's first museum. Its establishment followed numerous archaeological discoveries in Monaco and significant excavations at the famous Grimaldi caves in Italy at the turn of the 20th century. Under Prince Albert I's direction, these excavations employed innovative and pioneering techniques for their time, including diligent maintenance of excavation logs, spatial tracking of artifacts, extensive probing, sieving processes, and the formation of interdisciplinary research teams.

The original museum building served both as a research laboratory and a venue for public education. By the 1950s, however, this facility became inadequate to house the growing collections acquired through excavations, chance discoveries, and donations from private and princely sources. In response, Prince Rainier III commissioned the construction of a new building dedicated to prehistoric anthropology. The site chosen for this new museum was adjacent to the Observatory Cave, which contains the oldest evidence of human occupation in Monaco—a Paleolithic sequence spanning approximately 200,000 years.

The new museum building was designed by a Monegasque architect with scientific requirements in mind, under the supervision of Louis Barral, a Monegasque prehistorian, writer, and lexicographerwho became the Director of the new museum. The facility included a research laboratory, workshop, storage space for collections, exhibition rooms, and a conference room. While the museum opened to the public on 17 July 1959, its official inauguration by Prince Rainier III, Princess Grace, and Prince Pierre, Duke of Valentinois took place on 20 November 1960, the day after Monaco's National Day.

In 1954, concurrent with the planning of the new museum, the scientific publications of the Museum of Prehistoric Anthropology were established, along with an association bringing together speleologists and archaeologists. This enhanced the museum's role as a centre for scientific research and dissemination of knowledge.

Over its 120-year history, the museum has continually adapted and renewed itself through scientific research and outreach programs. Today, as it prepares for further scientific, cultural, and architectural extensions, the Museum of Prehistoric Anthropology remains committed to the study of human origins and the preservation of humanity's heritage, maintaining its position in international archaeological research and collaboration.

== Collections ==
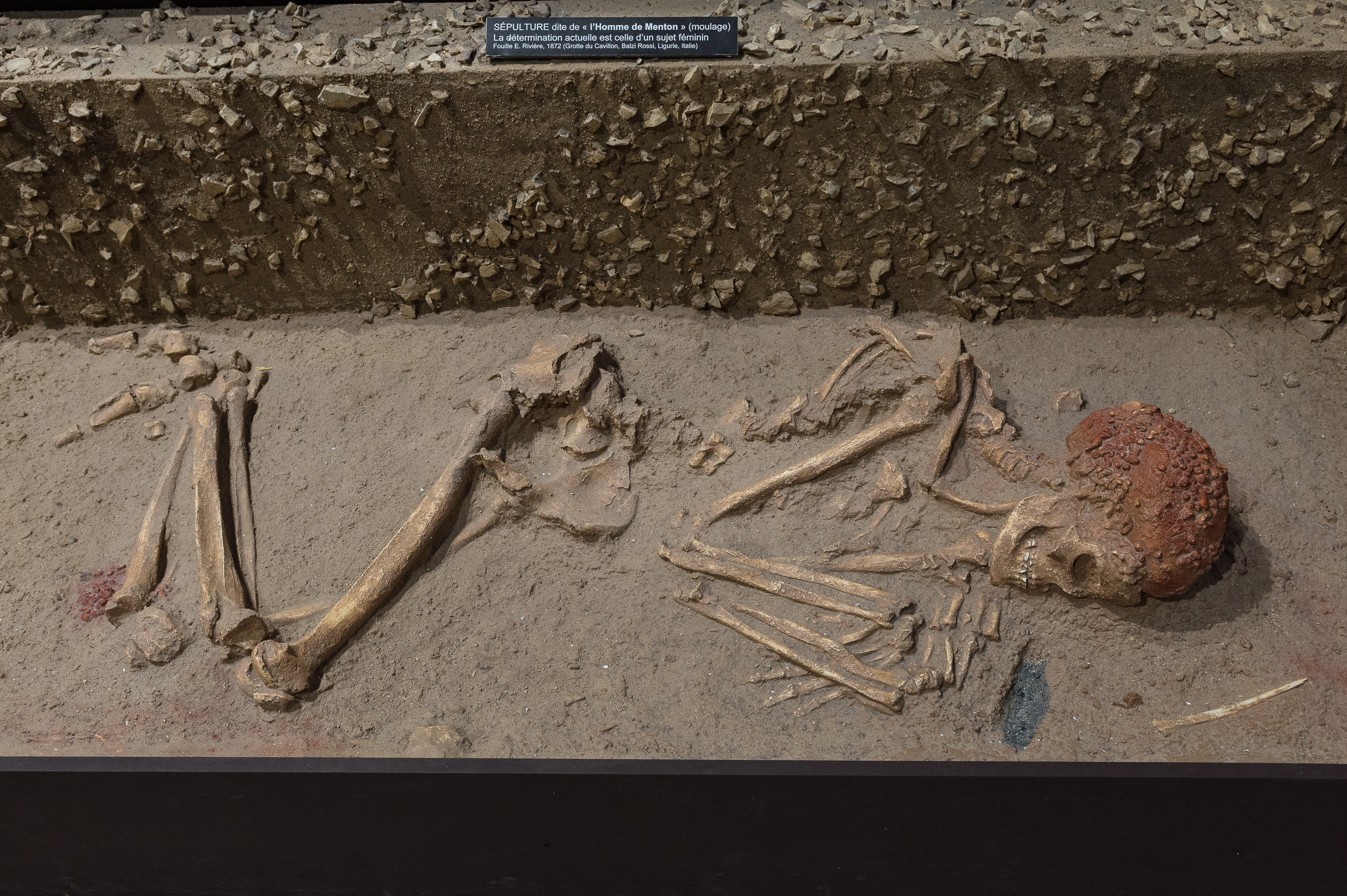
"La Donna del Caviglione", a cast of a Paleolithic burial discovered in Grotta del Caviglione (Cavillon Cave) at Balzi Rossi near Ventimiglia, Italy

The Museum of Prehistoric Anthropology houses rich and diverse collections that have been continuously enriched over more than a century. These collections span from prehistory to the present day and originate not only from Monaco but also from numerous countries worldwide. Notable among these are artifacts from the Grimaldi Caves in Italy, where Prince Albert I's team excavated sites including la Barma del Ponte, the Cavillon cave, the Children's cave, and the Lorenzi shelter. The museum also preserves significant findings from the Observatory Cave, which contains a Paleolithic sequence spanning approximately 200,000 years, and the Prince of Monaco Cave, where Acheulean artifacts and a human iliac bone dated to 200,000 years ago were discovered.

In addition to Paleolithic materials, the museum's collections include archaeological artifacts from various time periods found during excavations in Monaco and neighbouring regions. Recent preventive excavations near the Oceanographic Museum have yielded valuable information about the use of the Monaco-Ville rock between the 14th and 19th centuries. The museum also houses collections from further afield, including Egyptian artifacts (such as the mummy of a woman named Merit who died around 300 BC) and pre-Hispanic items from the Atacama Desert in Chile. These diverse holdings continue to be studied by international interdisciplinary teams, with new analyses and research regularly undertaken in collaboration with other museums and laboratories.

== See also ==
- List of museums in Monaco
