= Vatrican =

Vatrican is a surname. Notable people with the surname include:

- Michel Vatrican (born 1969), Monegasque bobsledder
- Thierry Vatrican (born 1975), Monegasque judoka
- Louis Vatrican (1904–2007), Monegasque agronomist
