= Hymne monégasque =

National anthem of Monaco

Hymne Monégasque / Inu Munegascu
English: Monégasque Anthem
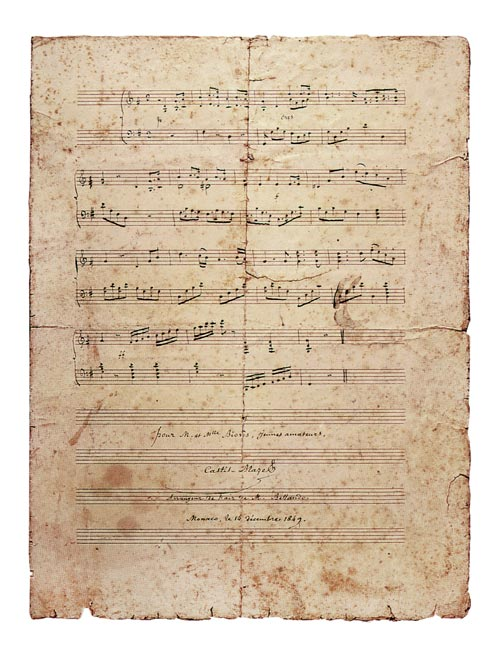
- Original sheet music of the "Hymne monégasque" (Théophile Bellando de Castro and Castil-Blaze, 1849)
- National anthem of Monaco
- Also known as: A Marcia de Muneghu (English: The March of Monaco); Inu Nactionale (English: National Anthem)
- Lyrics: Louis Notari, 1931
- Music: Léon Jehin (orchestral arrangement), 1914
- Adopted: 1848

Audio sample
- U.S. Navy Band instrumental version: file; help

"Hymne Monégasque" (Monégasque: "Inu Munegascu"; English: "Monégasque Anthem"), also known as "A Marcia de Muneghu" ("The March of Monaco"), is the national anthem of Monaco. It was originally adopted in 1848 with French lyrics by Théophile Bellando de Castro and music by Bellando and Castil-Blaze. The current official lyrics, which are in Monégasque, were written in 1931 by Louis Notari, while the current musical arrangement was composed in 1914 by Léon Jehin.

== History ==
Under the reign of Prince Florestan I who became the Monegasque sovereign in 1841, the Principality experienced an unstable internal situation. As early as 1821, repeated troubles broke out in Menton encouraged by agents of the Kingdom of Sardinia, abusively interpreting the treaty of Stupinigi signed on November 8, 1817, as a treaty submitting the Prince of Monaco and the Principality to a foreign authority. In order to respond to the broadcast in Monaco of seditious songs imported from the County of Nice, Monégasque lawyer Théophile Bellando de Castro wrote French lyrics and composed the music of the first version of the "Hymne Monégasque" in 1841 as a tribute of loyalty to the Prince and his family. Later, French musicologist Castil-Blaze modified the melody and made several other minor changes. In 1848, the National Guard, created by Prince Florestan, adopted Bellando's song, and it became the "March of the National Loyalists". In 1896, a new arrangement for piano composed by Monégasque composer Charles Albrecht was published by Tihebaux in Paris and titled "Air National de Monaco". In 1897, Decourcelle, a publisher in Nice, printed a new version of Albrecht's composition numbered 429 and titled "Hymne National de Monaco".

Years later, Monégasque musician François Bellini orchestrated the song by Albrecht; this new arrangement for a trio was judged to be too long for people in 1900 and ceased being played. The modern version was created by French composer Léon Jehin in 1914 and was played for the first time during the 25th anniversary of the beginning Prince Albert's reign. Finally, in 1931, Monégasque poet Louis Notari wrote the lyrics in the Monégasque language.

Fernand Bertrand of the Comité National des Traditions Monégasques (National Committee of Monégasque Traditions) later simplified the Monégasque lyrics while retaining the meaning, because people were finding it difficult to sing the first verse, which had a fast rhythm. Bertrand also noted that the second verse was no longer being played or sung. This is the version currently taught in schools to children and that almost all the population sings today.

== Lyrics ==
Although French is the only official language in Monaco, only the Monegasque lyrics of the anthem are official, reportedly dating back to a request from the Prince. The national anthem is rarely sung aloud in Monaco, except at official occasions.

=== Current lyrics ===
Sometimes, a version of these lyrics is sung that does not include the verse in the middle, which instead is left as an instrumental interlude.

Monégasque lyrics

Oilà cü ne toca !
Oilà cü ne garda !
Fò che cadün sace ben aiço d'aiçì

Riturnelu:
Despoei tugiù, sciü d'u nostru paise
Se ride au ventu, u meme pavayùn
Despoei tugiù a cuřù russa e gianca
E stà ř'emblèma d'a nostra libertà
Grandi e piciui, ř'an sempre respetà

N'amu ch'üna tradiçiun,
n'amu ch'üna religiun,
Amu avüu per u nostru unù
I meme Principi tugiù
E ren nun ne scangerà
Tantu ch'u suriyu lüjerà;
Diu sempre n'agiüterà
E ren nun ne scangerà

Riturnelu

English translation

Greetings, you who are our neighbours!
Greetings, you who are watching us!
It is important that everyone remembers the following:

Chorus:
Forever, in our land,
One flag has flown in the wind
Forever, the colours red and white
Have symbolised our liberty
Adults and children have always respected them.

We have perpetuated the same traditions;
We celebrate the same religion;
We have the honour
To have always had the same Princes.
And nothing will change
As long as the sun shines;
God will always help us
And nothing will change.

Chorus

=== Full lyrics (1928) ===
Monégasque lyrics

Oilà cü ne toca !
Oilà cü ne garda !
Fò che cadün sace ben aiço d'aiçì

Despœi tugiù sciü d'u nostru paise
Se ride au ventu u meme pavayun
Despœi tugiù a curù russa e gianca
E stà r'emblema d'a nostra libertà !
Grandi e piciui r'an tugiù respetà !

Riturnelu :
Amu avüu sempre r'a meme tradiçiun;
Amu avüu sempre r'a meme religiun;
Amu avüu per u nostru unù
I meme Principi tugiù
E düsciün nun purà ne fa sciangià
Tantu ch'au cielu u suriyu lüjerà;
Diu n'agiüterà
E mai düsciün nun purà ne
fa scangià
Düsciün

Nun sëmu pa gaïre,
Ma defendemu tüti a nostra tradiçiun;
Nun sëmu pa forti,
Ma se Diu vœ n'agiüterà !

Oilà cü ne toca !
Oilà cü ne garda !
Fo che cadün sace ben ailo d'ailì

Riturnelu

French translation

Ohé, vous qui nous voisinez!
Ohé, vous qui nous regardez!
Il importe que chacun retienne bien ceci:

Depuis toujours, le même pavillon
Flotte joyeusement au vent de notre pays
Depuis toujours les couleurs rouge et blanc
Constituent le symbole de notre liberté
Grands et petits l'ont toujours respecté!

Refrain :
Nous avons perpétué les mêmes traditions;
Nous célébrons la même religion;
Nous avons l'honneur
D'avoir toujours eu les mêmes Princes
Et personne ne pourra nous faire changer
tant que le soleil brillera dans le ciel
Dieu nous aidera
Et jamais personne ne pourra
nous faire changer
Personne.

Nous ne sommes pas bien nombreux,
Mais nous veillons tous à la défense de nos traditions;
Nous ne sommes pas très puissants,
Mais, s'il le veut, Dieu nous aidera !

Ohé, vous qui nous voisinez !
Ohé, vous qui nous regardez !
Il importe que chacun prenne bien conscience de cela !

Refrain

English translation

Greetings, you who are our neighbours!
Greetings, you who are watching us!
It is important that everyone remembers the following:

Historically, the same flag
Floats happily in the wind of our country
Always the colours red and white
Have been the symbol of our freedom
Great and small have always respected it!

Chorus:
We have perpetuated the same traditions;
We celebrate the same religion;
We have the honour
To have always had the same Princes
And no one can make us change
As long as the sun shines in the sky
God help us
And no one can ever
make us change
No one.

There are not very many of us,
But we all strive to defend our traditions;
We are not very powerful,
But if he wants to, God will help us!

Greetings, you who are our neighbours!
Greetings, you who are watching us!
It is important that everyone is well aware of that!

Chorus

=== Original lyrics (1841) ===
French lyrics

Principauté Monaco ma patrie,
Oh! Combien Dieu est prodigue pour toi.
Ciel toujours pur, rives toujours fleuries,
Ton Souverain est plus aimé qu'un Roi.

Fiers Compagnons de la Garde Civique,
Respectons tous la voix du Commandant.
Suivons toujours notre bannière antique.
Le tambour bat, marchons tous en avant.

Oui, Monaco connut toujours des braves,
Nous sommes tous leurs dignes descendants.
En aucun temps nous ne fûmes esclaves.
Et loin de nous, régnèrent les tyrans.

Que le nom d'un Prince plein de clémence,
Soit répété par mille et mille chants.
Nous mourrons tous pour sa propre défense,
Mais après nous, combattront nos enfants.

English translation

Principality of Monaco my country
Oh! How God is lavish with you.
The sky always pure, the shores always blooming [with flowers],
Your Monarch is more revered than a King.

Proud Companions of the Civic Guard,
Let us all respect the voice of the Commander.
Always follow our old banner.
The drum beats, let us all walk ahead.

Yes, Monaco always had brave men,
We are all their worthy descendants.
Never were we slaves.
And far from us the tyrants ruled.

That the name of a merciful Prince
Be repeated by a thousand songs.
We shall all die in his own defence,
But after us, our children will fight.

== See also ==
- List of national anthems
