= Monégasque dialect =

Variety of Ligurian spoken in Monaco

Monégasque
- munegascu
- In Monaco-Ville, some street signs are printed in both French and Monégasque.
- Native to: Monaco
- Ethnicity: 8,400 have Monegasque nationality (2016)
- Native speakers: (c. 20 cited for 1950) nearly extinct, but taught in school as a heritage language
- Language family: Indo-European: Italic; Latino-Faliscan; Latin; Romance; Italo-Western; Western; Gallo-Iberian; Gallo-Romance; Gallo-Italic; Ligurian; Intemelio; Monégasque

Official status
- Recognised minority language in: Monaco
- Regulated by: National Committee for Monegasque Traditions

Language codes
- ISO 639-3: –
- Glottolog: mone1238
- Linguasphere: 51-AAA-cha
- IETF: lij-MC

Monégasque (munegascu, pronounced [muneˈɡasku]; French: monégasque, pronounced [mɔneɡask]; Italian: monegasco) is the variety of Ligurian spoken in Monaco. It was a common language in the Principality until about 1911 when French became the sole language of instruction in public education. Even in religious schools it was greatly discouraged and demoted to a "patois" in public life. By the 1920s the language was close to extinction. Today, French is still the sole official language of Monaco, but Monégasque is considered an element of Monaco's cultural identity with extensive efforts to maintain and revitalize the language. Monégasque has a regulating body and standard that is separate from Ligurian. It is a compulsory subject in primary and secondary school with an annual language competition for schoolchildren over which the Prince presides. There are also free classes offered to adult learners through the National Committee for Monegasque Traditions.

Monégasque is closely related to the Ligurian dialect spoken in Ventimiglia and Genoese, and has been influenced by major languages such as French, Italian, and Spanish; and by smaller regional languages such as Mentonasc, Provençal, and Piedmontese.

== History ==
In 1191, the Republic of Genoa took possession of Monaco and began settling in 1215. These Genoese settlers brought their vernacular language with them which would develop into Monégasque. Prior to the Genoese settlers, the main language of the region was Provençal, as spoken in the nearby localities of Menton and Roquebrune. By 1355, Menton, Roquebrune, and Monaco were under the political union of the Grimaldis, but despite this, there was a linguistic divide as the primary language of Monaco was Ligurian. Over time Monégasque began to split from the Genoese vernacular as Monaco came under the political influence of foreign powers, namely taking influences from French and Italian, but also briefly from Spanish and Catalan as Monaco had been under Spanish occupation for over a hundred years, ending in 1641.

Afterwards, Monaco would be under French protection and prior to the French Revolution, Italian and Monégasque were the primary languages of the political elite, administration, clergy and natives. French would however begin to become a major influence as France instituted bilingual government. At this time the population of Monaco was mainly made up of immigrants and descendants from Genoa and other parts of Liguria, and though Monégasque was not written, it was openly spoken and passed down through families by oral tradition. People coming in from the Italian city-states were considered closer neighbours than those coming in from Grimaldi-led cities of Menton and Roquebrune, who were considered foreigners despite their union with Monaco.

In 1793, Monaco was annexed by France and by 1805, decrees from Napoleon, Emperor of the French, imposed French-language instruction and limited the use of other languages. The Grimaldis reestablished a sovereign principality in 1814, but maintained French as the only official language though Italian and Monégasque remained national languages. In 1815, Prince Honoré IV decreed French and Italian equal status in education, though Italian gradually declined as the nearby regions became more French, noticeably in 1860 with the French annexation of Nice. Monégasque was then demoted to a "patois," and barred from being taught or spoken in public and religious schools until 1976, in a similar manner to that of Occitan in France.

The first written traces of Monégasque appear between 1721 and 1729 in the correspondence of Antonio I with his daughter Louise Hippolyte, as well as in a few notarial deeds, but the language remained above all, oral. The population of Monaco City rose from 1,200 inhabitants in 1860 to 22,000 in 1880; Monégasque found itself threatened by the massive influx of foreign workers and by the development of a pidgin mixing Provençal, Piedmontese, Corsican, French, and Ligurian. At that time, Monégasque was banned from school and parents encouraged their children to speak French. In 1927, Louis Notari undertook the written codification of the language, drawing inspiration from the writing of French and Italian. The first Monegasque grammar and dictionary appeared in 1960 and 1963.

By 1924, Monégasque was close to extinction if not for the efforts of the National Committee of Monégasque Traditions (Cumitáu Naçiunale d'ë Tradiçiúe Munegasche). In 1927, Louis Notari published the A Legenda de Santa Devota, the first literary work in Monégasque. This was soon followed by all kinds of literature, such as poetry, stories, and plays being written in Monégasque attracting more attention to the language. In 1972, the first class in Monégasque was taught by clergymen, Georges Franzi, with support from the Félibrige, an Occitan language association, and by 1976, Monégasque was made a compulsory subject in public and private primary education thanks to an initiative by the government. This was later expanded in 1979 and 1989 to make it a compulsory subject in secondary education and as an optional subject for the baccalaureate. In 1982, Prince Rainier III created a sovereign ordinance that established the Monégasque Language Committee, which is responsible for the education and study of the language.

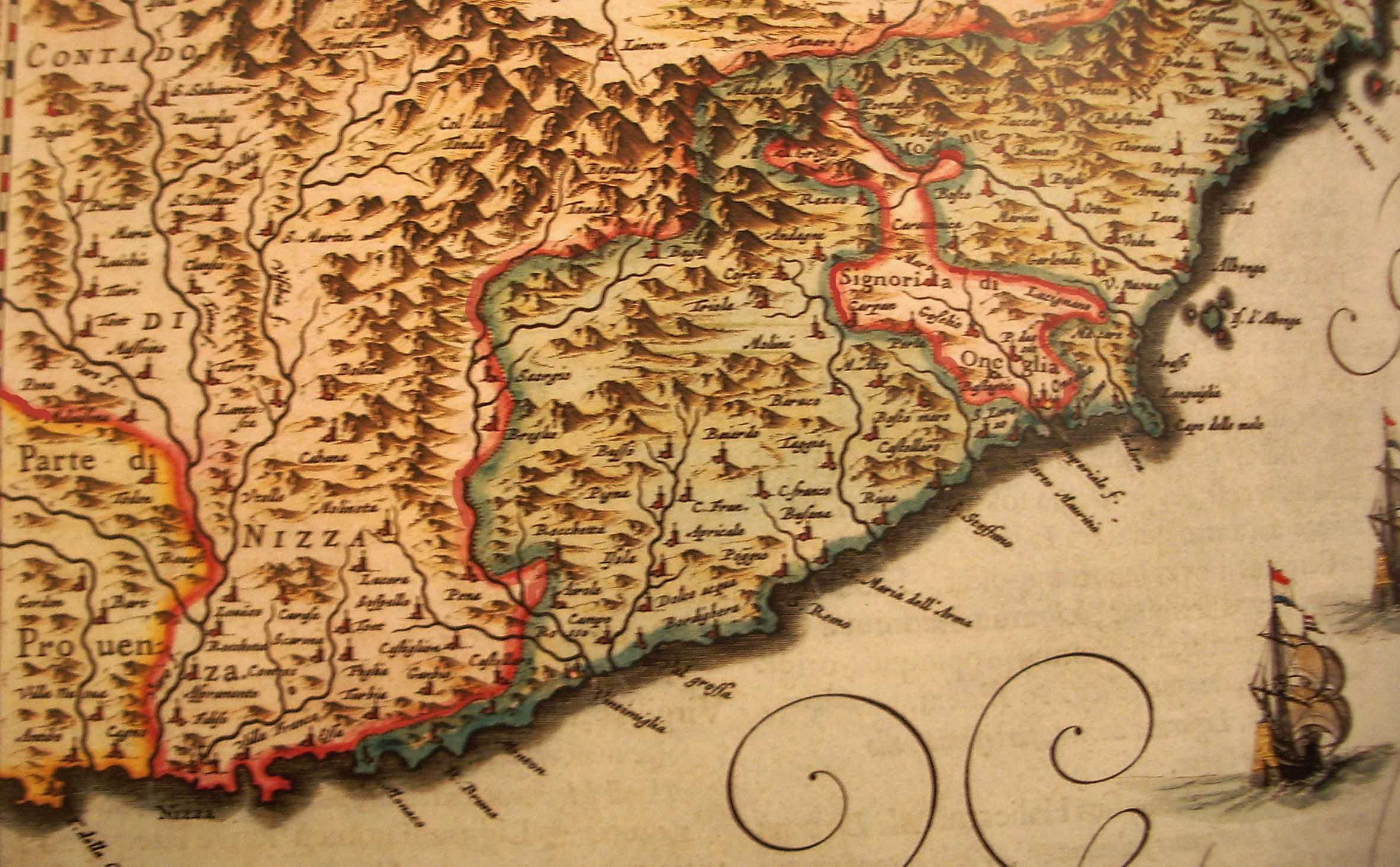
Monaco and Menton constituted the extreme western area of the Republic of Genoa (demarcated in green) in 1664.

== Status ==
The Constitution of Monaco states that French is the official language, while sovereign ordinances by Prince Rainier III established Monégasque as a compulsory language in private and public education. Monégasques are a minority in Monaco, so the survival of the language is complicated in a nation with 130 different nationalities. Despite being compulsory in education, it is not common for students in Monaco to use it outside the classroom or to take their bachelor's degree in Monégasque.

== Phonology ==
Monégasque phonology resembles Ligurian with some influences from French.

=== Consonants ===
		Labial	Dental/ Alveolar	Palatal (-alveolar)	Velar	Uvular
Nasal		m	n	ɲ	ŋ	
Plosive/ Affricate	voiceless	p	t	t͡ʃ	k	
Plosive/ Affricate	voiced	b	d	d͡ʒ	ɡ	
Fricative	voiceless	f	s	ʃ		ʁ
Fricative	voiced	v	z	ʒ		ʁ
Approximant			l	j	w	
Trill			(r)			

Monégasque historically had trilled and geminated rhotics with a "softer' intervocalic form which was called "r doux" (soft r). In 1983, Louis Notari noted that some speakers pronounced it rolled while others did not. Influence from French has caused the geminate to become uvular, while the softer form has become palatal.

On the other hand, for some modern speakers, intervocalic ⟨r⟩ is realized as an alveolar [ɹ], as in mera [ˈme.ɹa], but in schools in Monaco in the 21st century, [ʁ] predominates, regardless of its position in the word, or whether the form of R was historically geminated or not.

=== Vowels ===
	Front		Central	Back
Close	i	y		u
Mid	e	(ø)		ɔ
Open			a	

- In 1983, Louis Notari noted that in some quarters and in slang, the vowel /ø/ was used.
- All vowels have nasal counterparts /ĩ ỹ ũ ẽ ɔ̃ ø̃ ã/.

== Orthography ==
Monégasque uses its own standard orthographic system that is separate from the grafia ofiçiâ ("official orthography") that used for Ligurian. It was developed by Louis Notari who was close to the Occitan language association, Félibrige. He was inspired by the Mistral alphabet, though the actual alphabet is mostly based off Italian with a few letters taken from French and some new letters that are unique to Monégasque. He wanted wanted each letter to correspond to one sound, so that the language could be spelt as spoken.

The Monégasque alphabet consists of the following letters: ⟨a⟩, ⟨b⟩, ⟨c⟩, ⟨ç⟩, ⟨d⟩, ⟨e⟩, ⟨f⟩, ⟨g⟩, ⟨h⟩, ⟨i⟩, ⟨j⟩, ⟨l⟩, ⟨m⟩, ⟨n⟩, ⟨o⟩, ⟨p⟩, ⟨q⟩, ⟨r⟩, ⟨s⟩, ⟨t⟩, ⟨u⟩, ⟨v⟩, ⟨z⟩.

- ⟨c⟩ and ⟨g⟩ are used as they are in Italian, where before the vowels ⟨i⟩ and ⟨e⟩ they are pronounced [tʃ] and [dʒ].
- ⟨ç⟩ is [s] as in French.
- ⟨h⟩ is used as it is in Italian, to give letters a hard sound, ⟨ch⟩ [k] and ⟨gh⟩ [g].
- ⟨j⟩ is [ʒ] as in French.
- ⟨r⟩ is pronounced as in French [ʁ].
- ⟨s⟩ is pronounced [ʃ] before ⟨t⟩, ⟨c⟩, and ⟨p⟩ and before the vowels ⟨i⟩ and ⟨e⟩. Intervocalic ⟨s⟩ is pronounced [z].

In addition there are the letters: ⟨ü⟩, ⟨œ⟩, ⟨k⟩, ⟨ë⟩, ⟨ř⟩.

- ⟨ü⟩ is pronounced [y].
- ⟨œ⟩ is used for etymological reasons and originated from Latin long [oː], i.e. Latin nōctem became Monegasque nœte. It was historically pronounced [ø], but is now [e]. It can also be pronounced as a more closed [œ]. It is also used to distinguish words that have the same pronunciation in Monégasque.
- ⟨k⟩ is just for foreign words. Normally ⟨c⟩ or ⟨ch⟩ would be used such as in canguro "kangaroo" or chilometru "kilometer."
- There is disagreement in the Monégasque Language Committee on how to pronounce ⟨ë⟩. Etymologically it originates from Latin long [eː]. It has been described as either a long [iː] or very closed [e]. Notari maintained that it is [i] and in writing that just ⟨i⟩ be used. However, Notari uses ⟨e⟩ in his 1983 dictionary, and today words which were historically spelt with ⟨ë⟩ are often spelt and pronounced with ⟨e⟩, e.g. sera ("evening"), historically spelt sëra, is pronounced [ˈse.ʁa ~ ˈse.ɹa], instead of [ˈsiː.ʁa ~ ˈsiː.ɹa], among which [ˈse.ʁa] is the pronunciation taught to schoolchildren in Monaco.
- ⟨ř⟩ or "r doux" is intervocalic and has a sound that closely resembles [l]. The definite articles řu, řa, ři, ře have this soft sound despite not being intervocalic.

There are two digraphs and one trigraph: ⟨gl⟩, ⟨sc⟩, ⟨scc⟩.

- ⟨gl⟩ is pronounced [j]. It is usually replaced with ⟨y⟩, i.e. famiglia "family" and famiya.
- ⟨sc⟩ is [sk] unless before the vowels ⟨i⟩ and ⟨e⟩, in which case it is [ʃ].
- ⟨scc⟩ is pronounced [ʃtʃ].

=== Diphthongs ===
Monégasque has the following diphthongs :

Diphthongs
	IPA	Example		IPA	Example
ai	[ai]	àiga "water"	ia	[ia]	bestia "beast"
au	[au]	auřiva "olive"	ie	[ie]	ientrà "enter"
ei	[ei]	i pei "the feet"	oi	[oi]	ri toi "yours"
œi	[ei]	frescœi "beignets"	ou	[ou]	ün sou "a penny"
eu	[eu]	buřèu "mushroom"	ui	[ui]	nui "we"
			üu	[yu]	püu "hair"

=== Accent ===
Whereas French words have the final syllable accented, Monégasque accents shifts positions like in Latin. The rules for accents in Monégasque are:

1. The accent falls on the penultimate syllable.
2. The accent falls on the final syllable of words whose original final syllable in Latin had been truncated, in which case it's important to accent the word if it ends in a vowel, to avoid confusing words that are spelt the same. It's not necessary if the word ends in a consonant.
3. The accent is marked whenever it falls on the antepenultimate syllable.
4. To differentiate monosyllabic words that are spelt the same. It also indicates that that word must be pronounced with greater emphasis.
5. To separate two non-diphthong vowels.

== Grammar ==
Present tense -à
	Singular	Plural
1st person	-u	-amu
2nd person	-i	-è
3rd person	-a	-u(n)

Esse (To be)
	Singular	Plural
1st person	sun	semu
2nd person	si	si
3rd person	è	sun

Avè (To have)
	Singular	Plural
1st person	o	amu
2nd person	ai	avi
3rd person	a	an

== Literature ==
Beginning with Louis Notari’s A Legenda de Santa Devota, any semblance of written Monégasque was usually referred to as Ligurian, Genoese, Italian, and sometimes even French.

Other authors in Monégasque include:

- Louis Barral, curator of the Museum of Prehistoric Anthropology, lexicographer of the Monégasque dictionary, and author of science fiction.
- Suzanne Simone, co-author of the dictionary with Barral.
- Robert Boisson, founder of the Academy of Dialectal Languages (French: Academie des languages dialectales) and poet of works such as Vibrations intérieures – Harmonies Humaines.
- Louis Frolla, clergyman and grammarian of Monégasque.
- Georges Franzi teacher of Monégasque and activist for education in Monégasque.
- Étienne Clerissi, actor, artist, and author of numerous plays in Monégasque.
- Jules Soccal, sailor and author of Le Vocabulaire monégasque de la marine et de la mer, a description of Monégasque sea jargon.

== Samples ==
Below is an excerpt from the Monégasque national anthem, written by Louis Notari. In addition, there is an older French version of the anthem; its lyrics have a different meaning. The choice between the two forms is generally subject to the occasion and the circumstance.

Despœi tugiù sciü d'u nostru paise
Se ride au ventu, u meme pavayùn
Despœi tugiù a curù russa e gianca
E stà l'emblema, d'a nostra libertà
Grandi e i piciui, l'an sempre respetà

The following is a Monégasque rendering of the Hail Mary:

Ave Maria,
Tüta de graçia
u Signù è cun tü
si benedëta tra tüt'ë done
e Gesü u to Fiyu è benejiu.

Santa Maria, maire de Diu,
prega per nùi, pecatùi
aùra e à l'ura d'a nostra morte
AMEN. (Che sice cusci.)

== See also ==
- Languages of Monaco
- Languages of Europe
- Languages of Italy
