= Lucien Éloi Bellando de Castro =

Monegasque General and Politician (1824–1923)

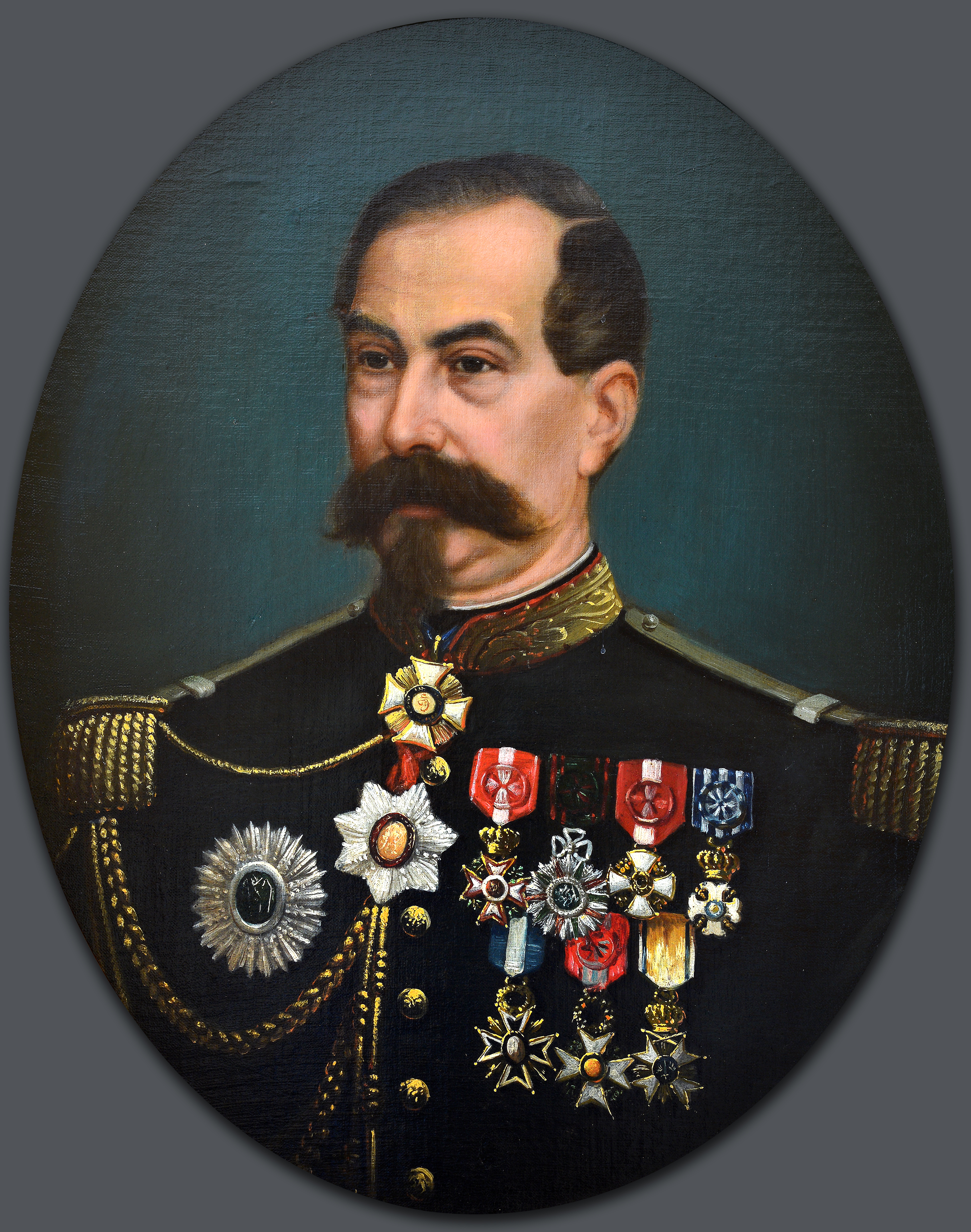
- Bellando de Castro in 1877
- Born: 1 December 1824; Monaco
- Died: December 3, 1923 (aged 99); Monaco
- Spouse: Anna Bogner
- Children: 3
- Military career
- Allegiance: Monaco
- Branch: Compagnie des Carabiniers du Prince
- Service years: 1845–1923
- Rank: Colonel
- Awards: Order of Saint Charles (Grand Cross); Legion of Honour (Commander); Order of Charles III (Spain); Nichan Iftikhar (Grand Officer); Order of the Sword (Commander)

Lucien Éloi Bellando de Castro (Monaco, 1 December 1824 – Monaco, 3 December 1923), was a Monegasque soldier and general who served as Aide-de-camp to Prince Charles III, and to Prince Albert I. His brother was Théophile Bellando de Castro, a Monegasque lawyer and author of the National Anthem of Monaco.

== Early life ==
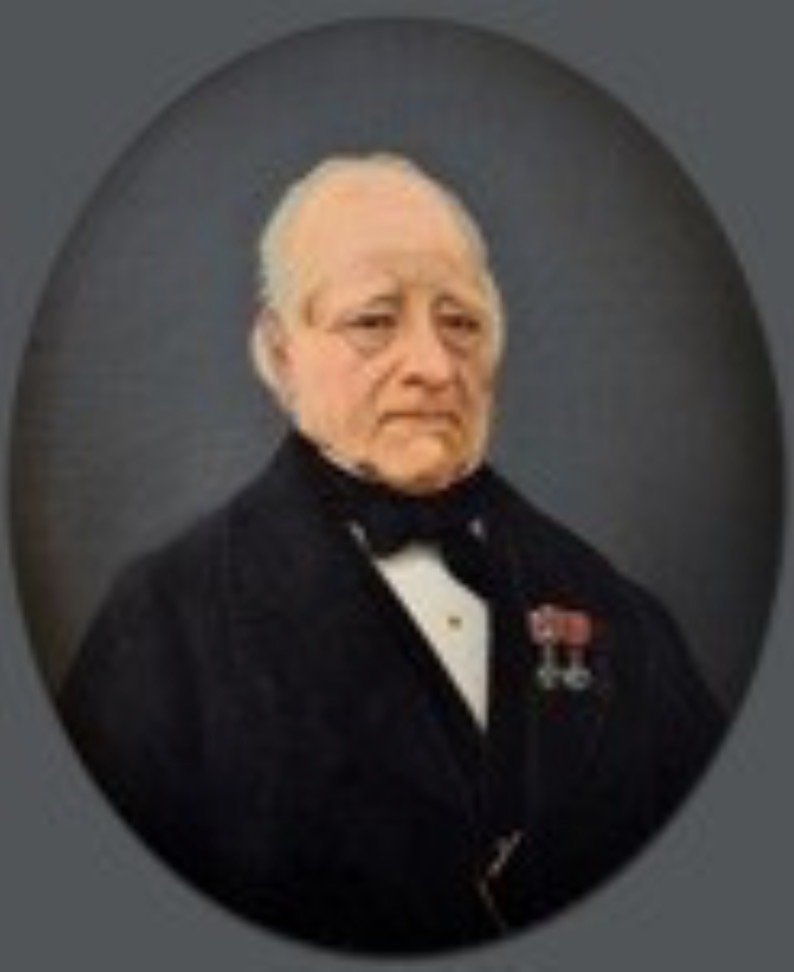
Antoine Bellando de Castro, Lucien's father

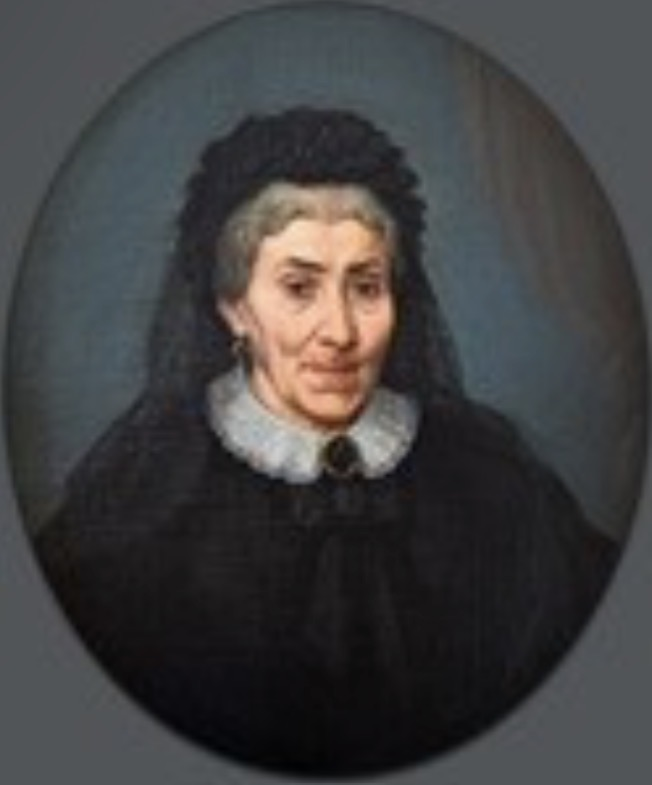
Marie-Théodore Aillaud de Sausses, Lucien's mother

Lucien Éloi Bellando de Castro was born in Monaco on 1 December 1824, the son of Antoine Bellando de Castro (1786–1877) and Marie-Théodore Aillaud de Sausses (1800–1893). His older brother was Théophile Bellando de Castro, a Monegasque lawyer and author of the National Anthem of Monaco. His father came from a well-established Monegasque Family, which has been present in Monaco since the 16th century. He followed in his father's footsteps and began his military career in 1845, serving the princes Florestan, Charles III, Albert I, and Louis II.

== Career ==
Bellando de Castro entered the Monegasque Military on 20 November 1845 as a second lieutenant in the Carabiniers of the Prince. He was promoted through the ranks, becoming lieutenant in the National Guard in 1849, lieutenant overseeing artillery in the Carabiniers in 1851, and captain and officer of the prince's ordnance in 1852. Notably, he accompanied the Duke of Valentinois (future Prince Charles III) to Menton in 1854, where they were captured by Sardinian troops before being released through diplomatic intervention.

Subsequent promotions included captain of the general staff and aide-de-camp to Prince Charles III in 1856, squadron leader of the general staff in 1861, lieutenant-colonel in 1873, and colonel in 1896.

== Civil career ==
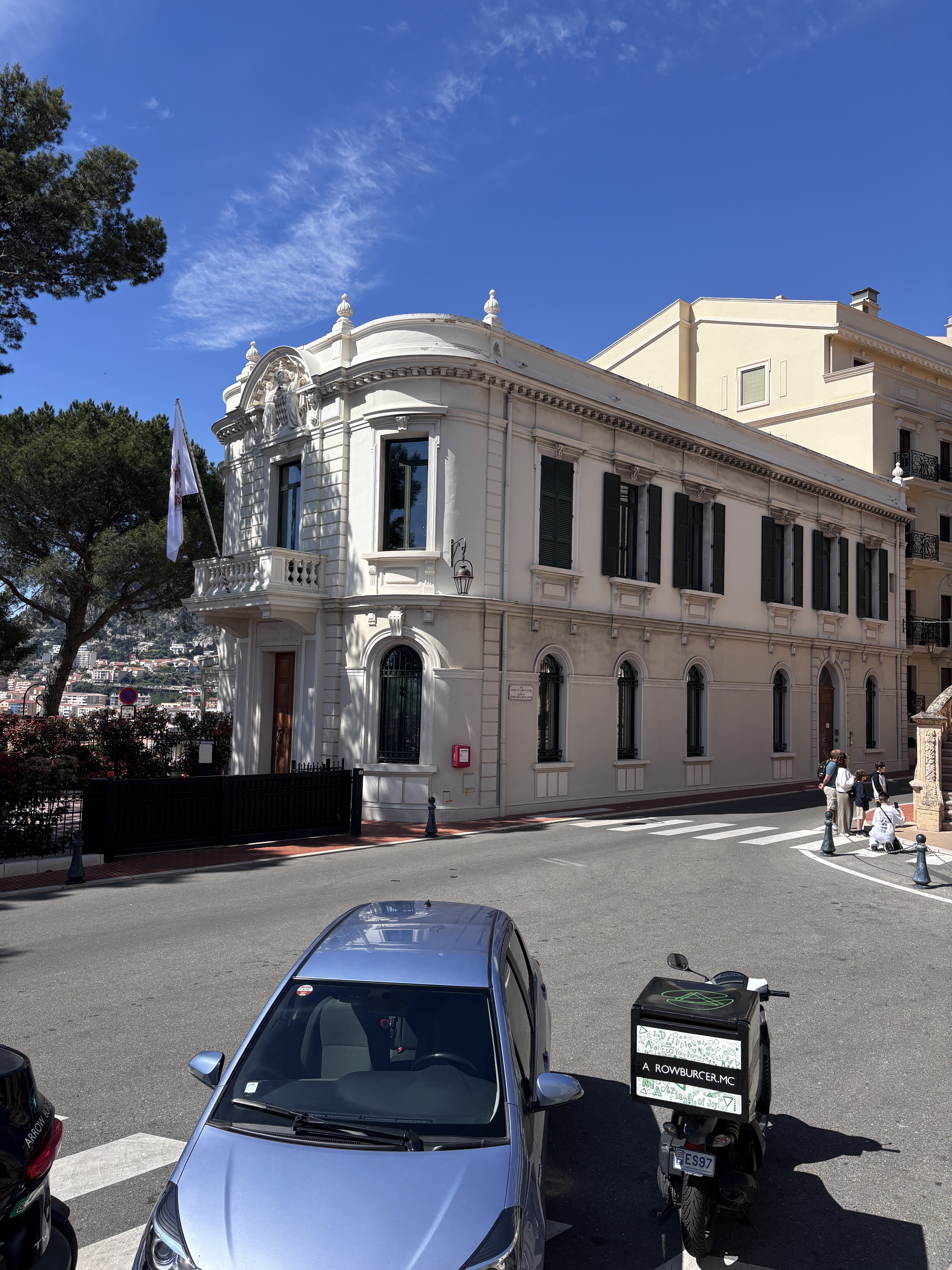
View of Rue Bellando de Castro

Alongside his military career, Bellando de Castro served as Interim Secretary General of the Government, and was appointed on 6 August 1874, succeeding Henri de Payan. On 16 August 1909 he was appointed Member of the Superior Council of Government of Monaco. He succeeded his father as a member of the Council of the Fabric of the Cathedral of Monaco following his death in 1877, and served as churchwarden until 1912. On 27 November 1920, he was named Chancellor of the Order of Saint-Charles, a position he held until his death on 3 December 1923, aged 99.

On 22 May 1933, the Special Municipal Delegation proposed renaming the Rue du Tribunal in his honor. The street, leading from the Cathedral Square to the Palace Square, became Rue Colonel Bellando de Castro, with plaques inaugurated on 20 March 1934.

== Family ==
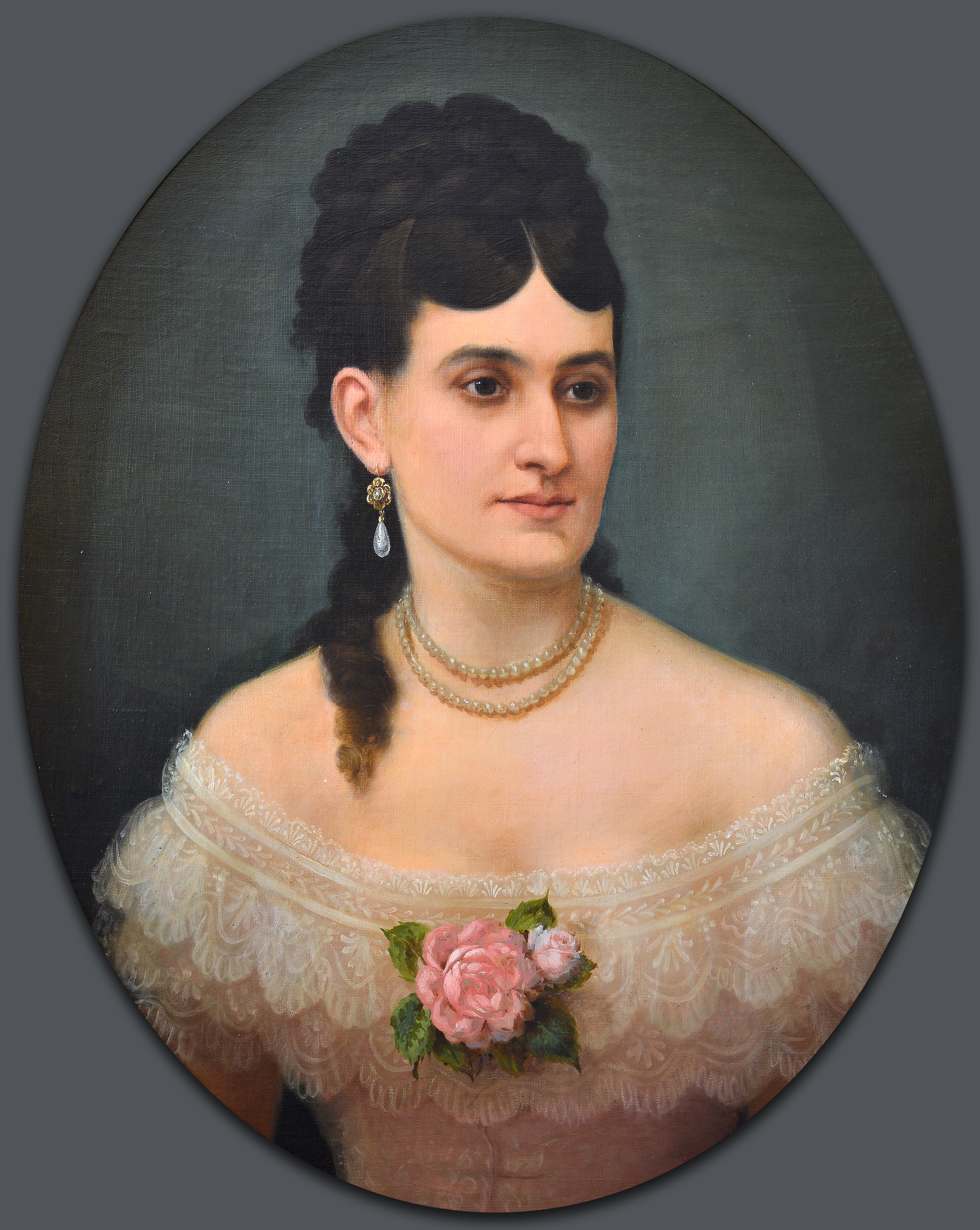
Anna Josepha Bogner

Lucien Éloi Bellando de Castro married Anna Josepha Bogner on 14 September 1864, a lady-in-waiting to Antoinette de Mérode, and had 3 children:

- Lucien Bellando de Castro (1867–1954), Magistrate, Councillor of State, and President of the Committee of Monegasque Traditions.
- Louis Bellando de Castro (1870–1964), Government Councillor for Finance and President of the Board of Directors of the Société des Bains de Mer.
- Charles Bellando de Castro (1878–1960) – Government Councillor for Public Works, President of the Monegasque Olympic Committee, and President of the National Council of Monaco.

Ancestors of Lucien Éloi Bellando de Castro

8. Dominique Bonaventure Bellando (1727–1800)
4. Epiphane François Bellando (1758–1837)
9. Jeanne Marie Félice Penco (1725–1801)
2. Antoine Alexandre Bellando de Castro (1786–1877)
10. Joseph Hyacinte Viale (1710–1768)
5. Marie Elisabeth Catherine Viale (1756–1848)
11. Louise Marie Françoise Bosano (1721–?)
1. Lucien Éloi Bellando de Castro
12. Michel Antoine Aillaud de Sausses (1715–1801)
6. Benjamin André Aillaud de Sausses (1765–1844)
13. Angèle Pétronille Marie Pretti de Sainte Croix (1728–1785)
3. Marie Théodorine Aillaud de Sausses (1800–1893)
14. Jacques François Eléonore Gastaldy (1731–1816)
7. Anne Marie Thérèse Gastaldy (1768–1853)
15. Anne Marie Melon (1740–?)
