= Théophile Bellando de Castro =

Monegasque solicitor, writer of the national anthem (1820–1903)

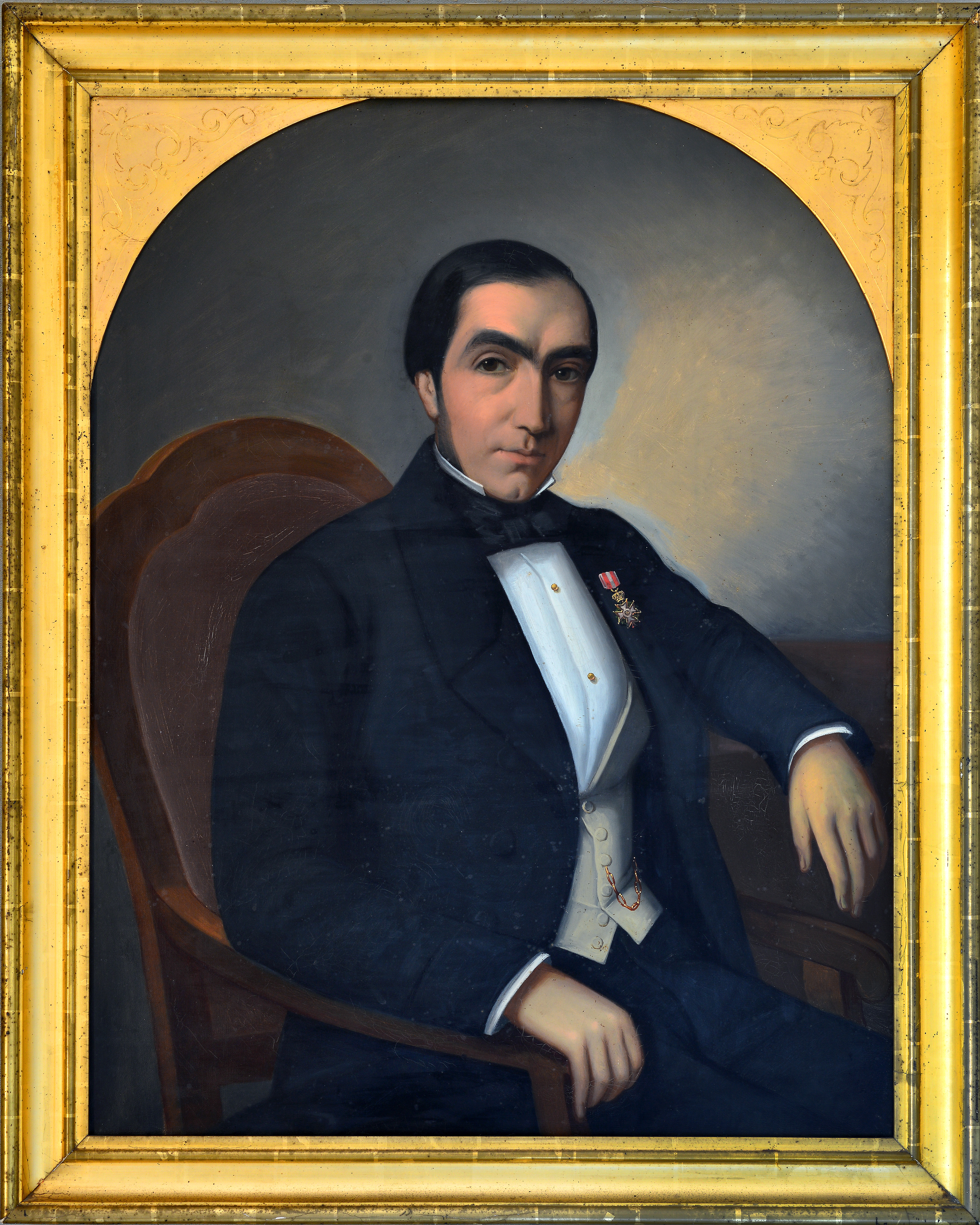

Personal details
- Born: 7 March 1820 Monaco
- Died: 16 May 1903 (aged 83) Monaco
- Awards: Order of St. Charles (1863)

Théophile Bellando de Castro (7 March 1820 – 16 May 1903) was a lawyer from Monaco. He wrote the Monegasque anthem.

== Early life ==
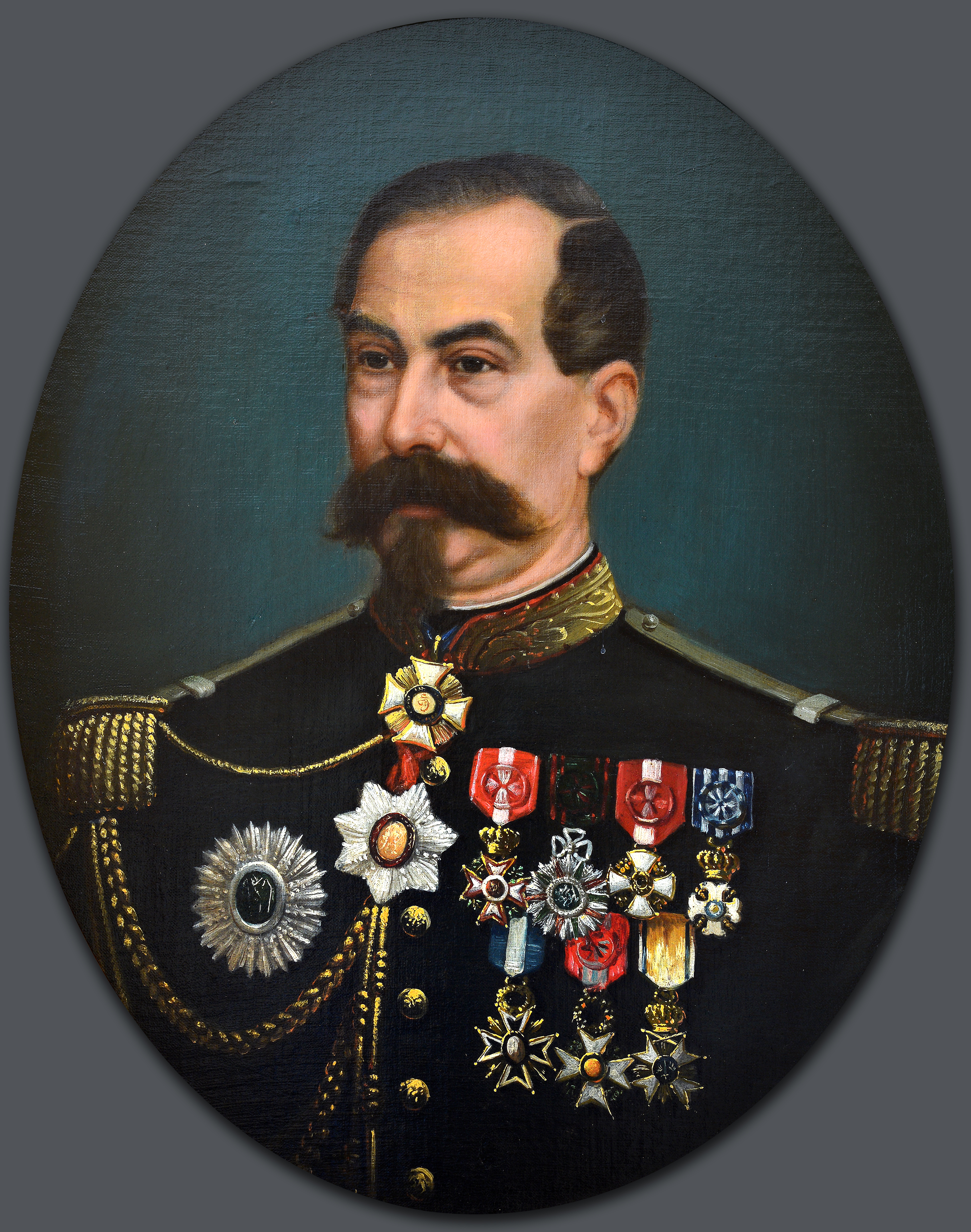
Bellando de Castro’s brother, Lucien

Théophile Bellando de Castro was born on 7 March 1820 in Monaco, son of Antoine and Marie-Théodore Aillaud de Sausses. His brother was the Monegasque politician and general Lucien Éloi Bellando de Castro.

== Career ==
Bellando de Castro was a lawyer.

Bellando de Castro wrote the "Hymne Monégasque," the national anthem of Monaco. The "Hymne Monégasque" was first publicly performed in the fall of 1867, with music by fellow Monegasque Charles Albrecht. Bellando de Castro was awarded the Order of St. Charles.

== Death ==
Bellando de Castro died on 16 May 1903 in Monaco.

== See also ==
- Hymne Monégasque: Original lyrics
