= Princess Grace Irish Library =

Library in Monaco

- 43°43′52.6″N 7°25′26″E
- Location: Monaco
- Established: 1984; 42 years ago
- Branches: N/A

Collection
- Size: More than 9,000 books and sheet music

Access and use
- Population served: Monegasque citizenry and residents

Other information
- Website: pgil.mc

The Princess Grace Irish Library is a library situated in Monaco named after Princess Grace, the wife and consort of Prince Rainier III. Among its collections of Irish literature, the library hosts the personal collection of Irish books and music that belonged to Grace, whose paternal relatives came from County Mayo, Ireland. The library was established in November 1984 by Prince Rainier, in memory of his wife.

== Founding and collections ==
The Library was founded by Princess Grace's husband, Prince Rainier II, and novelist Anthony Burgess in honor of Grace's Irish heritage. The collection originally contained the princess's personal library of Irish literature and Irish-American sheet music. Since its founding, it has acquired over twelve thousand books, including literature from the Irish Literary Revival as well as classic volumes. The Library also contains multiple portraits and pictures of Princess Grace, by artists Mohamed Drisi, Jack Yeats, Louis le Brocquy, Jack Murray and Claire D’Arcy, respectively. The collection has a selection for young readers, offering books and DVDs for age two and upwards.

== Events and publications ==
The library regularly sponsors public lectures and issues literary monographs. Previous speakers include poet Seamus Heaney. The library also hosted at one time a large, detailed, comprehensive and definitive online reference database of Irish writers, but this is now available instead at Ricorso's official website. The library also hosts regular conferences on Irish literature and readings. A Biennal Autumn Symposia is held at the Irish Library; past themes include "Irish Poetry After Feminism" and "George Moore: Situating the Oeuvre".

== Bursaries ==
In association with the Ireland Fund of Monaco, residential bursaries have been established "to enable literary and academic writers born or living in Ireland to pursue a current project during a one-month residency at The Princess Grace Irish Library in Monaco". The bursaries are available in the spring and the fall.

== See also ==
- Bibliothèque Louis Notari, primary Monaco library.
