= Louis Frolla =

Monegasque writer (1904–1978)

Louis Frolla (1904–1978) was a clergyman and writer in Monégasque, the national language of the Principality of Monaco.

He was notably the author of a Monégasque Grammar (1960) through the medium of French and a Monégasque-French Dictionary (1963). These works were much later reissued by the Comité National des Traditions Monégasques (Louis Frolla, Grammaire Monégasque, Imprimerie Nationalede Monaco, S.A., Réédité par le Comité National des Traditions Monégasques, Imprimerie Testa Monaco, 1998; Louis Frolla, Dictionnaire Monégasque-Français, Ministère d'Etat, Département de l'Intérieur, Principauté de Monaco, Réédité par le Comité National des Traditions Monégasques.)

A French-Monégasque Dictionary, by Louis Barral and Suzanne Simone, complementing Frolla's edition, was issued in 1983.

Frolla was thus one of the writers who significantly contributed to a renaissance of the language — particularly patronized by the late Rainier III, Prince of Monaco (reigned 1949–2005). In the 20th century, Monégasque had been threatened with extinction.

Frolla was also the author of a work on the history of philosophy (Louis Frolla, La Pensée philosophique à travers les ages, Editions du Mont-Blanc, Paris, 1949).

== See also ==
- Louis Barral § Lexicographical writings
