= Louis Vatrican =

Monegasque agronomist (1904–2007)

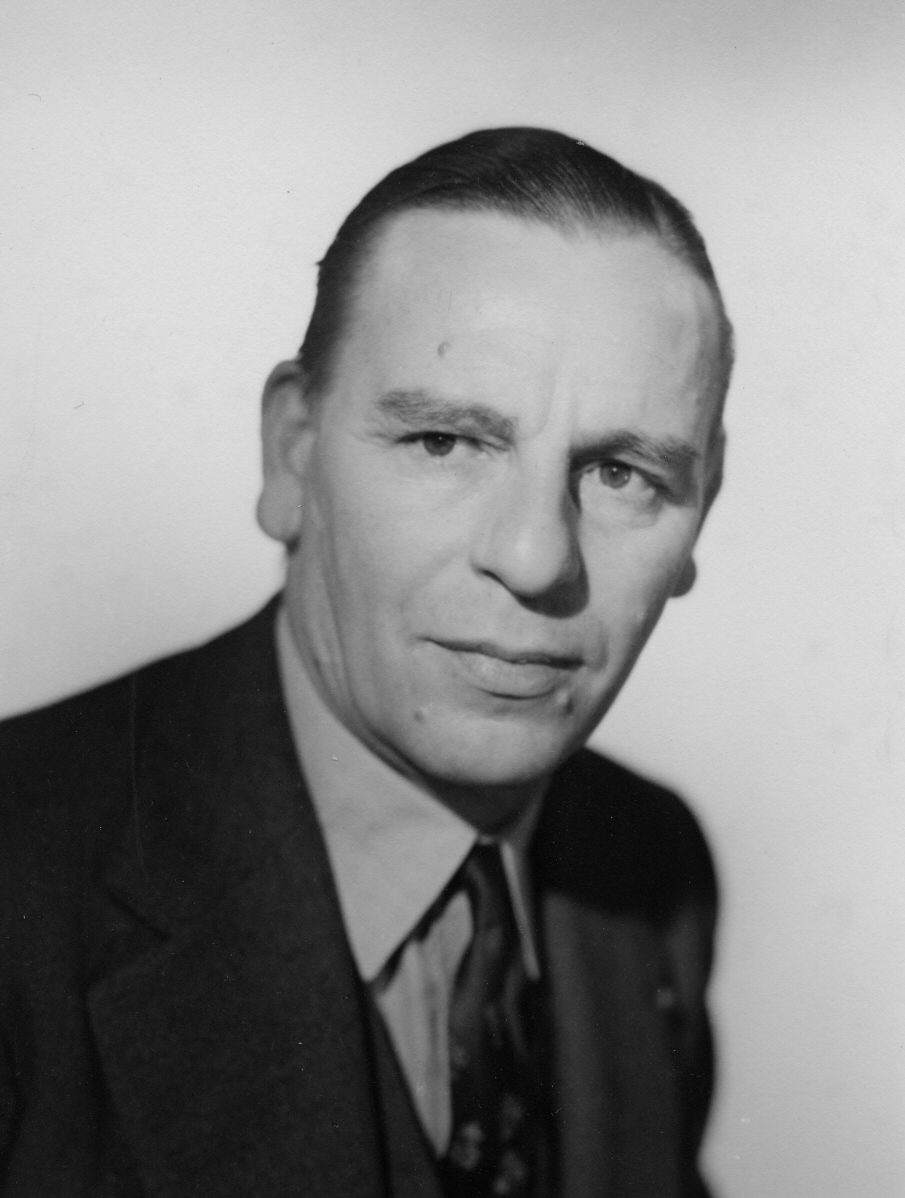
- Born: 7 May 1904; Monaco
- Died: 7 June 2007 (aged 103); Monaco
- Occupation: Agronomist

Louis Vatrican (French pronunciation: [lwi vatʁikɑ̃]; 7 May 1904 – 7 June 2007) was a Monegasque agronomist.

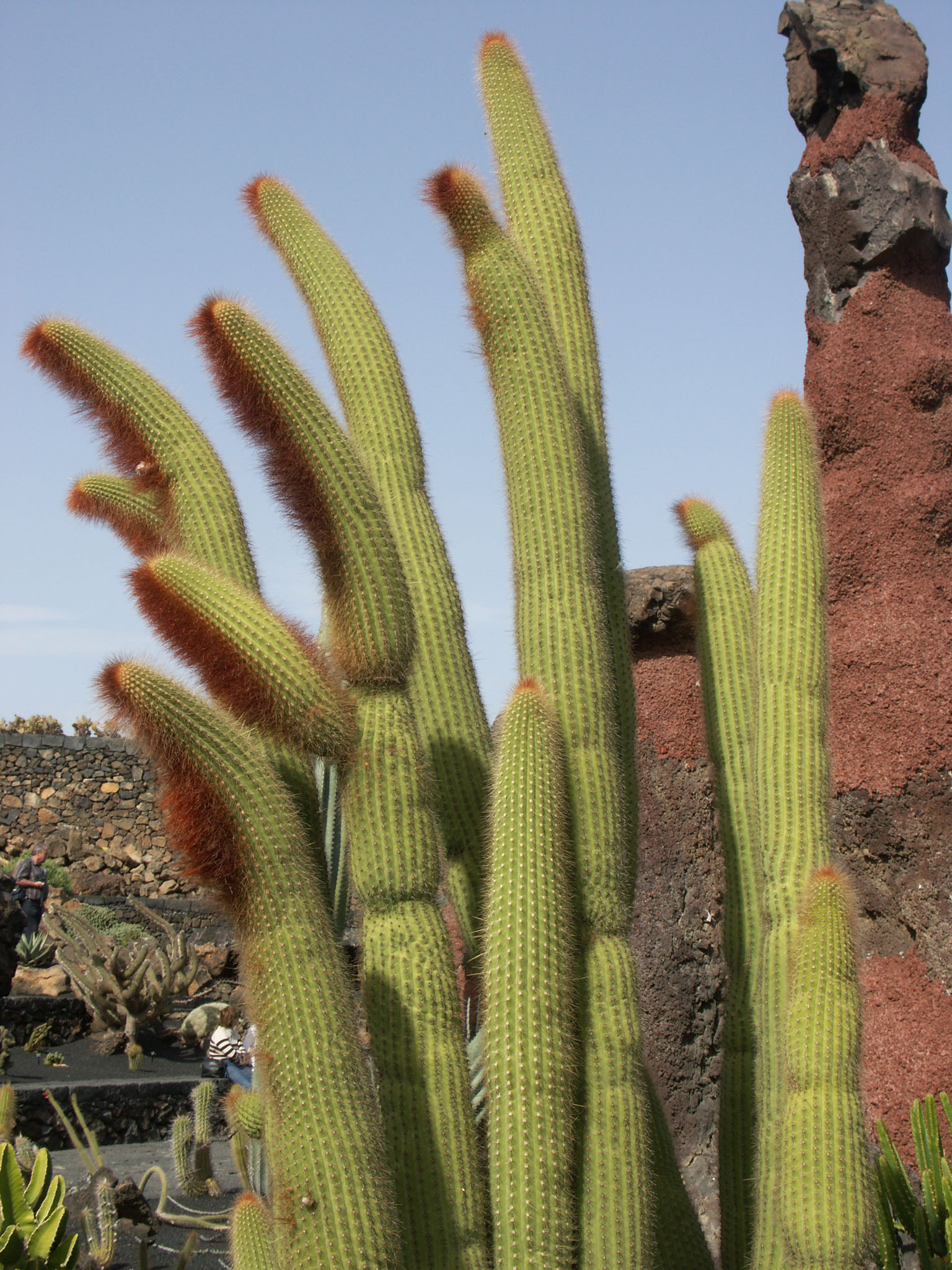
Vatricania guentherii.

== Career ==
Vatrican served as the director of the Jardin Exotique de Monaco from 1936 to 1969. Vatrican added succulents from Africa to the existing South American succulents, some of which died in 1985-86. After he retired in 1969, Vatrican was succeeded by Marcel Kroenlein.

The Vatricania guentherii, a cactus endemic to South America, was named in his honor in 1950 by Curt Backeberg.

He was a founding member of the International Organization for Succulent Plant Study (IOS) and vice-president of the 1953 edition of the Congress that took place in Monaco.

== Death ==
Vatrican died on 7 June 2007 in Monaco, aged 103.
