= Jardin Exotique de Monaco =

Botanical garden in Monaco

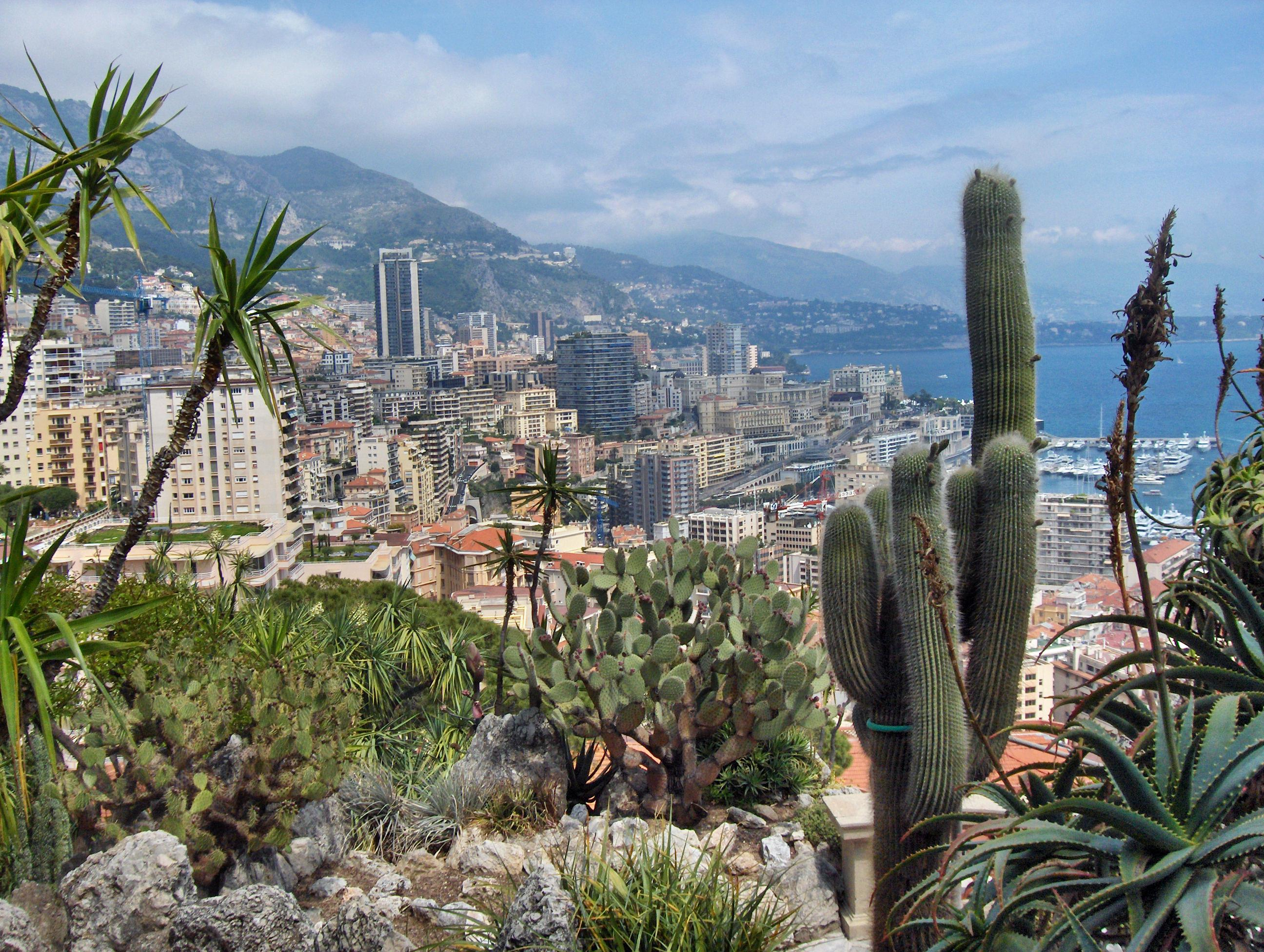
- View on Monte Carlo as seen from the Exotic garden
- Interactive map of Jardin Exotique de Monaco
- Type: Botanical garden
- Coordinates: 43°43′56″N 7°24′50″E
- Opened: 1931; 95 years ago
- Website: www.jardin-exotique.mc

The Jardin Exotique de Monaco (French: [ʒaʁdɛ̃ ɛɡzɔtik d(ə) mɔnako], lit. 'Exotic Garden of Monaco') is a botanical garden located on a cliffside in Monaco. The garden, which first opened in 1931, primarily features exotic succulent plants. The garden is the home to the Museum of Prehistoric Anthropology, whose exhibits include pre-historic artifacts that were excavated from the garden's grotto.

The garden closed in 2020 due to the COVID-19 pandemic, and has remained closed since for renovations. The garden currently plans to open again during the spring of 2026.

== Gardens ==
The garden features over 1,000 species and 6,000 varieties of succulent plants from around the world.

== History ==
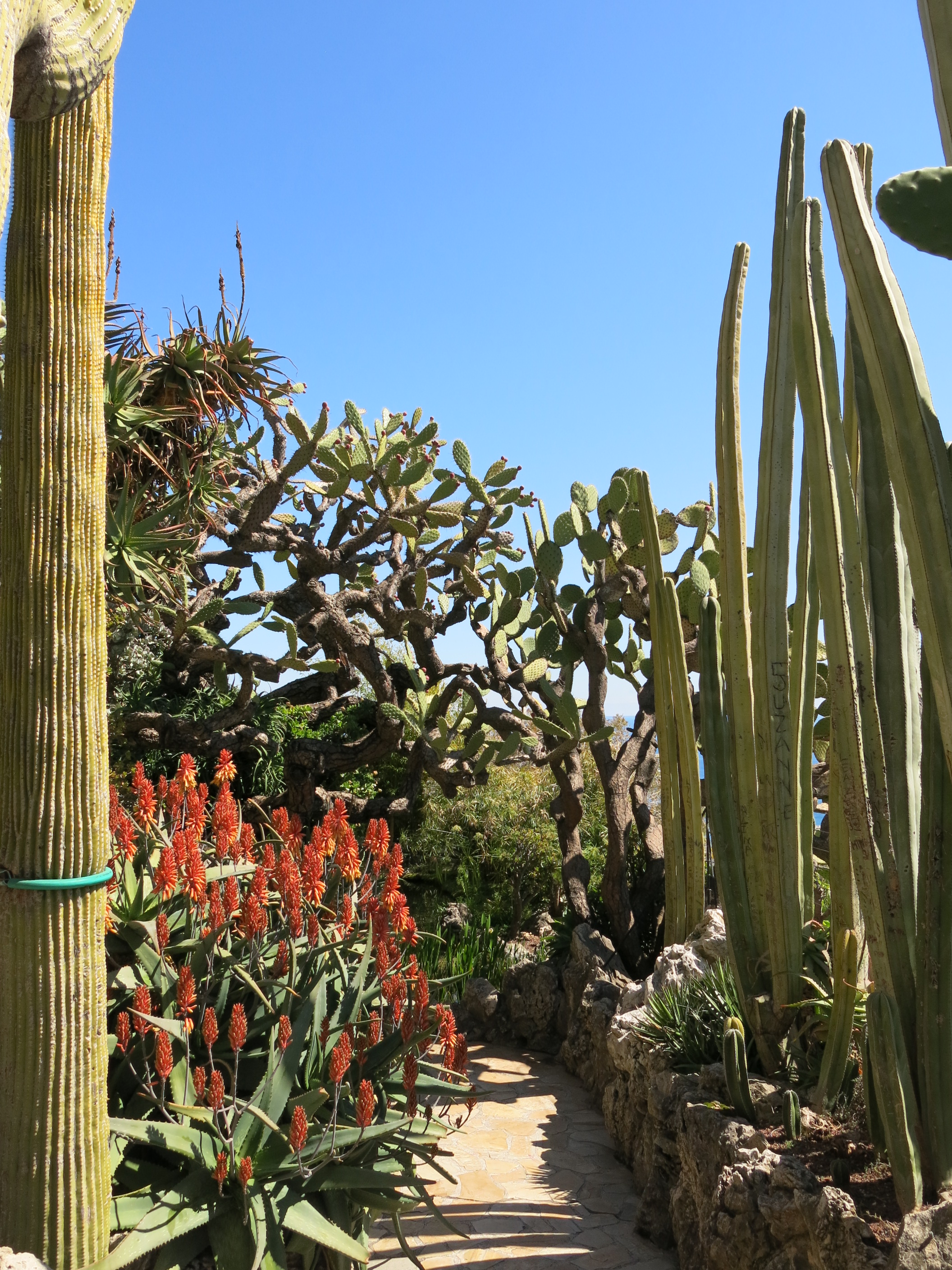
Jardin Exotique

Succulent plants were first brought back to Europe from Mexico in the late 1860s following the Second French intervention in Mexico. Augustin Gastaud, the Chief Gardener of the State Gardens of Monaco, became fascinated with succulent plants. In 1895 he began cultivating them in a plot in the Jardin St. Martin. Prince Albert I, who frequently passed by the garden on his way to the Oceanographic Museum, also became fascinated by the exotic plants.

In 1912, Prince Albert I acquired the promontory of the observatory in Les Moneghetti. He commissioned Louis Notari, the Chief Engineer of Monaco, to build a new garden for growing exotic flora. The garden was designed to have natural-looking rock features, and footbridges were built along the garden's narrow path. Construction began in 1913, a year before the beginning of World War I. In 1916, a grotto was uncovered in the eastern section of the garden. The remains of numerous animal species and evidence of early human habitation were discovered in the grotto caves. After being under construction for 20 years, the garden was formally inaugurated on 7 February 1933 by Prince Louis II, having been open since 1931.

In 1959, the Museum of Prehistoric Anthropology (first established by Prince Albert I in 1901) was moved to the Jardin Exotique de Monaco. One of the rooms in the museum displays prehistoric artifacts that were found in and around Monaco, including artifacts that were found in the garden's grotto caves.

Monegasque agronomist Louis Vatrican served as the garden's first director from 1933 to 1969. After he retired in 1969, he was succeeded by Marcel Kroenlein. Kroenlein introduced species of African succulents to the garden's existing collection of American plants. Kroenlein has gone on many plant-hunting expeditions to the United States, Mexico, South America, Africa, Madagascar, and Yemen in search of new succulents. He has personally contributed over 2,000 plants to the garden's collection.

== Closure ==
The garden closed to the public in 2020 due to COVID-19 lockdowns. It originally planned to re-open in January 2021, but re-opening was postponed until summer 2022 due to renovation work. As of 2023, the garden remains closed to carry out renovation work and upgrade security. The botanical center, however, remained open. The garden previously opened each Saturday at 10:00 AM and 2:00 PM for reserved guided tours. Initial plans were to re-open the garden in summer 2025; this was later pushed back to spring 2026.
