= Louis Barral =

Monégasque lexicographer (1910–1999)

Louis Barral (1910–1999) was a Monégasque lexicographer.

== Lexicographical writings ==
He was the joint author, with Suzanne Simone, of a French–Monégasque Dictionary (1983). This work complements Louis Frolla's Monégasque–French Dictionary (1963).

The dictionary and other works have contributed to a flourishing of literature in the Monégasque language.

== Anthropological activities ==
Barral was the keeper of the Prehistoric Anthropology Museum of Monaco.

== History ==
In April 1958, Louis Barral discovered the Cavern of Vallonnet along with René Pascal.

== See also ==
- Louis Frolla#Lexicographical writings
