= Jules Soccal =

Monegasque sailor (1907–1976)

Personal information
- Nationality: Monegasque
- Born: 10 August 1907
- Died: 12 January 1976 (aged 68)

Sport
- Sport: Sailing

Jules Soccal (10 August 1907 – 12 January 1976) was a Monegasque sailor. He competed in the Dragon event at the 1960 Summer Olympics.
