= Death and funeral of Rainier III, Prince of Monaco =

2005 funeral of Rainier III, Prince of Monaco

Funeral of Rainier III, Prince of Monaco
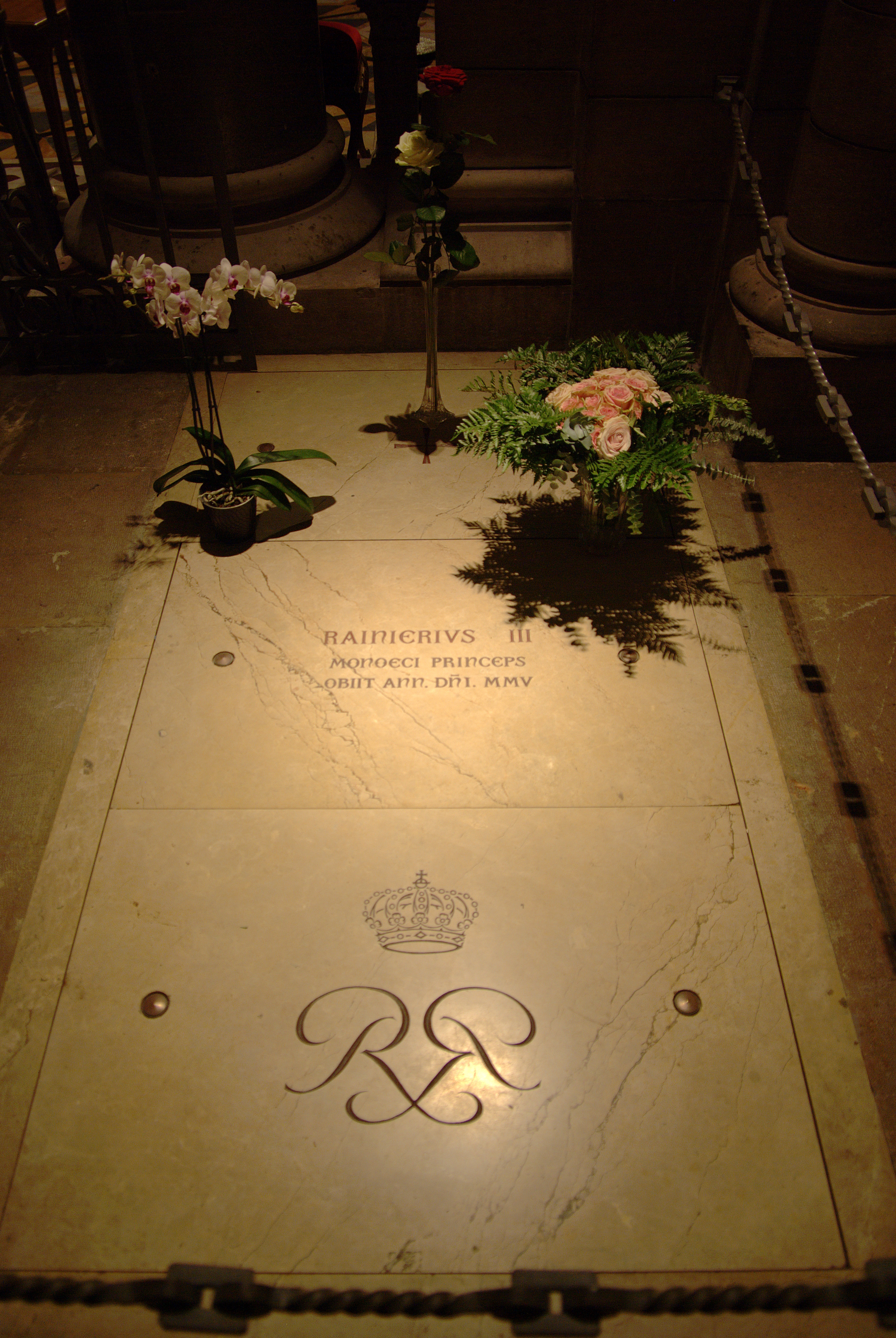
- The tomb of Rainierius III ('Rainier III' in Latin), Prince of Monaco
- Date: 15 April 2005; 21 years ago
- Location: Cathedral of Our Lady Immaculate, Monaco-Ville
- Participants: Princely Family of Monaco

The funeral of Rainier III, Prince of Monaco, took place at the Cathedral of Our Lady Immaculate in Monaco-Ville on 15 April 2005. A heavy smoker, Rainier suffered from chest and lung infections in his final years and was hospitalized numerous times. He was placed in intensive care unit with renal and heart failure in March 2005. He died on 6 April at the age of 81. His only son, Albert, was at his bedside. He was Europe's longest-serving monarch at the time of his death.

== Funeral service ==
Rainier's remains lay in state from 6 April at the Palatine Chapel at the Prince's Palace of Monaco. Members of the public were allowed to file past the coffin to pay their respects. On the day of the funeral, flags flew at half-mast. His coffin was draped in a red and white flag that featured the coat of arms of the House of Grimaldi and the moto Deo Juvante ("With God's Help"). It was borne in a procession of 170-member staff by ten pallbearers chosen from the Prince's Company of Carabineers who carried it from the palace to the cathedral on a 200-metre route. Rainier's children, some of his grandchildren, and other close relatives followed behind. His dog Odin was also included in the procession. The coffin was brought out of the palace via the Gate of Honor, which was symbolically closed afterwards. The band played Beethoven's "Funeral March" as the coffin proceeded through the city and a battery fired 36 gun salutes. The funeral march was chosen by his elder daughter.

The coffin was taken into the cathedral by six officers. Once inside the cathedral, a sword was placed on the coffin, and candles were lit by his family members. Dignitaries and representatives from sixty countries were present for the ceremony, including members of the royal families of Bahrain, Belgium, Bulgaria, Denmark, Egypt, Greece, Japan, Luxembourg, Norway, Saudi Arabia, Spain, Sweden, and the United Kingdom. The 90-minute service was broadcast on television. The music that accompanied the requiem mass included Samuel Barber's Adagio for Strings, which had been previously played at his wife Grace's funeral. The Archbishop of Monaco gave the eulogy, in which he described Rainier as the "builder prince". He went on to add "For all of us, the prince was, of course, the sovereign, but he was also a friend, a member of the family." He also described Rainier and his late wife Princess Grace as "an exceptional couple, united by the heart and spirit." Rainier was buried during a private service attended by close relatives in the family crypt next to his wife, who had died in 1982. Another mass held at the cathedral was attended by members of the public.

Floral tributes were left outside the cathedral by members of the public. 1,300 members of Monégasque and French police were responsible for providing security. The harbour was completely sealed off. Monte Carlo Casino and other businesses were also closed on the day of the funeral.

== Attendees ==
=== Family ===
==== House of Grimaldi ====
- The Prince of Monaco, Prince Rainier's son
- The Princess of Hanover, Prince Rainier's daughter
  - Charlotte Casiraghi, Prince Rainier's granddaughter
  - Pierre Casiraghi, Prince Rainier's grandson
- Princess Stéphanie of Monaco, Prince Rainier's daughter
- The Baroness of Massy, Prince Rainier's sister

=== Foreign Royalty ===
==== Members of reigning royal families ====
- Prince Abdullah bin Hamad bin Isa Al Khalifa (representing the King of Bahrain)
- (Belgium) The King of the Belgians
- Prince Joachim of Denmark (representing the Queen of Denmark)
- The Prince and Princess Hitachi (representing the Emperor of Japan)
- Prince Faisal bin Hussein and Princess Alia bin Faisal of Jordan (representing the King of Jordan)
- The Hereditary Prince of Liechtenstein (representing the Sovereign Prince of Liechtenstein)
- The Grand Duke and Grand Duchess of Luxembourg
- Prince Moulay Rachid of Marroco (representing the King of Morocco)
- The Prince of Orange (representing the Queen of the Netherlands)
- The Queen of Norway (representing the King of Norway)
- The King of Spain
- The King and Queen of Sweden
- The Duke of York (representing the Queen of the United Kingdom)

==== Members of non-reigning royal families ====
- Empress Farah of Iran
- King Constantine II of Greece
- Prince and Princess Michael of Greece and Denmark
- Crown Prince Alexander and Crown Princess Katherine of Serbia
- The Prince of Turnovo
- The Prince and Princess of Naples
  - The Prince and Princess of Venice
- Princess Ferial of Egypt
- The Count and Countess of Paris
- Archduke Karl of Austria
- The Duke and Duchess of Braganza
- The Duke and Duchess of Castro

=== Non-royal dignitaries ===
- President Jacques Chirac, and his wife Bernadette Chirac of France
- (Republic of Ireland) President Mary McAleese of Ireland
- (United States) Former Secretary of the Navy John Lehman
- (United States) Ambassador Howard H. Leach

=== Other notable attendees ===
- Karl Lagerfeld
