= Caritas Monaco =

Catholic charity organisation in Monaco

- Established: 1990; 36 years ago
- Founder: Bishop Joseph-Marie Sardou
- Type: Nonprofit
- Headquarters: Sainte-Dévote Chapel
- Location: Ravin de Sainte-Dévote, Monaco
- Coordinates: 43.7374°N 7.4210°E
- Origins: Catholic Social Teaching
- Services: social aid
- Official language: French
- President: Deacon Robert Ferrua
- Affiliations: Caritas Europa, Caritas Internationalis
- Revenue: 224,400 Euro (2023)
- Website: www.caritas-monaco.com

Caritas Monaco is a not-for-profit social welfare organisation in Monaco. It is a service of the Monégasque Catholic Church.

Caritas Monaco is a member of both Caritas Europa and Caritas Internationalis and the smallest national Caritas organisation in the world.

== History ==
The organisation was founded in 1990 by Msgr. Joseph-Marie Sardou, who served as the Archbishop of Monaco from 1985 to 2000. Its mission is to "end poverty, defend justice and restore human dignity". It was directed by Canon Philippe Blanc until 2007; since then, Deacon Robert Ferrua has been Caritas Monaco's president.

In 2011, Caritas Monaco became a member of the global Caritas Internationalis confederation.

In 2015, the Monaco postal service issues a stamp to celebrate the 25th anniversary of Caritas Monaco.

== Work ==
The mission of Caritas Monaco is to assist individuals facing poverty or emergency situations within the principality, its neighbouring communes in France, and abroad. Within the country, it provides basic support such as food, clothing, and supermarket vouchers to those in need. In 2016, Caritas Monaco also extended assistance to migrants stranded at the French-Italian border in nearby Ventimiglia.

In addition, Caritas Monaco contributes to the humanitarian efforts of other members of the Caritas Internationalis confederation. This includes supporting Caritas Ukraine following the 2022 Russian invasion, Caritas Turkey and Caritas Syria after the 2023 earthquake, and Caritas Italy in response to the 2023 floods in the Emilia-Romagna region.

Caritas Monaco works mostly through volunteers.
