= Archdiocese of Monaco =

Catholic archdiocese in Monaco

Coordinates: 43°43′51″N 7°25′27″E

Archdiocese of Monaco Archiodioecesis Monoecensis Archidiocèse de Monaco

Catholic
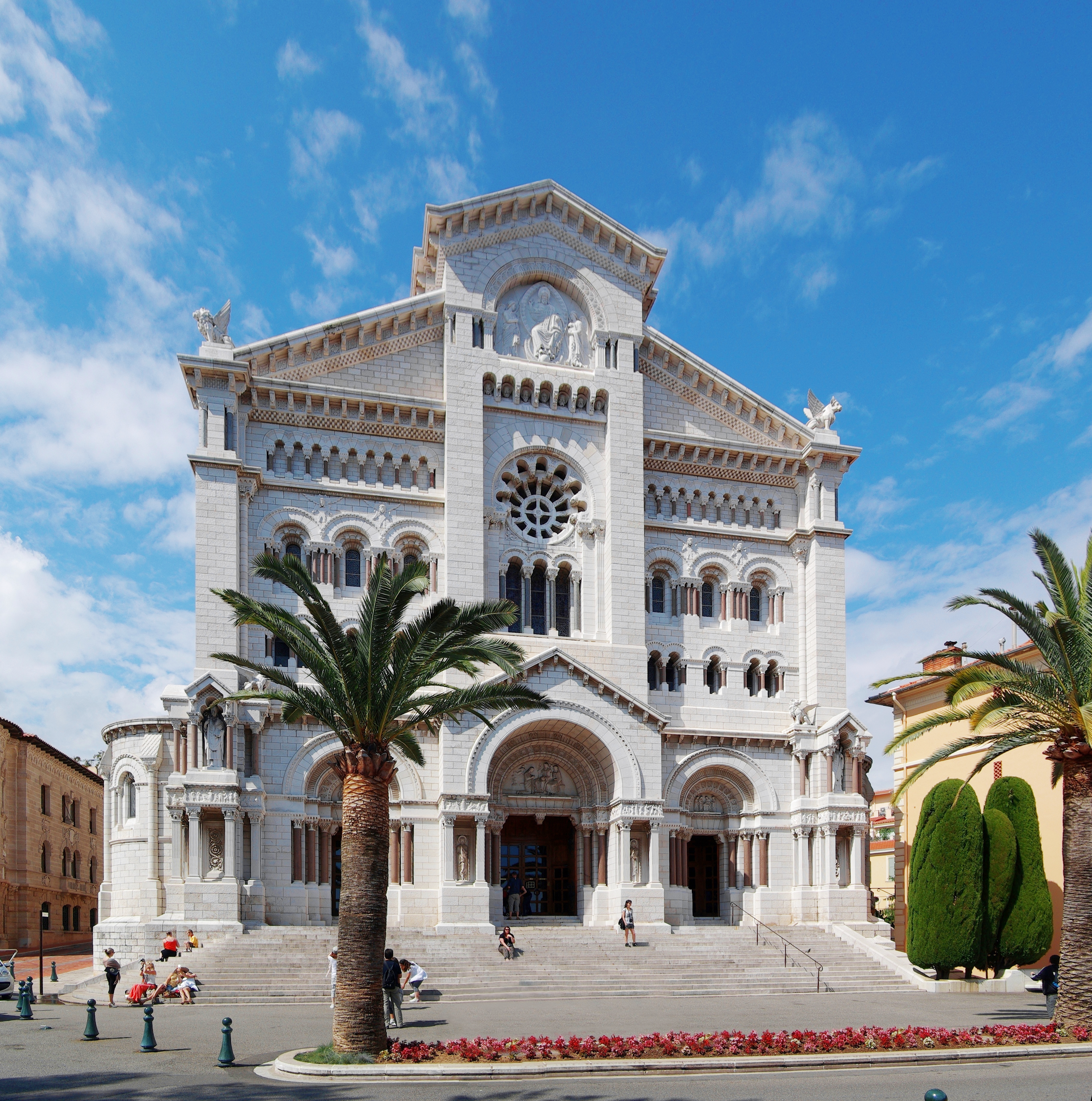
- Monaco Cathedral

Location
- Country: Monaco
- Territory: The entirety of the Principality of Monaco
- Metropolitan: Immediately subject to the Holy See

Statistics
- Area: 2 km^{2} (0.77 sq mi)
- Population: Total; Catholics: (as of 2013); 36,371; 30,000 (82.5%)
- Parishes: 6

Information
- Denomination: Catholic
- Sui iuris church: Latin Church
- Rite: Latin Rite
- Established: March 15, 1887
- Cathedral: Cathedral of Our Lady Immaculate
- Patron saint: Aurelia of Rome; Dévote; Roman

Current leadership
- Pope: Leo XIV
- Archbishop: Dominique-Marie David

Map
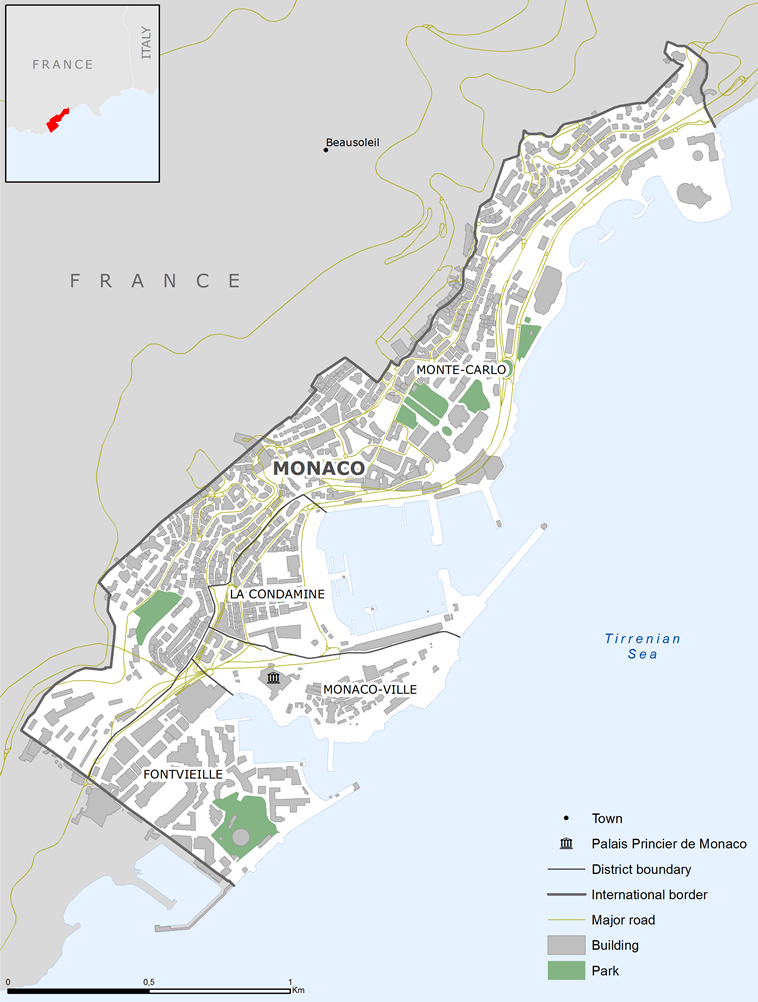

The Archdiocese of Monaco (Latin: Archidioecesis Monoecensis) is an exempt Latin ecclesiastical territory or archdiocese of the Catholic Church in Monaco. It is directly subject to the Holy See and not part of any ecclesiastical province. It is the smallest Catholic diocese in terms of area.

The archdiocese's mother church and thus seat of its archbishop is the Cathedral of Our Lady Immaculate (Saint Nicholas's or Monaco Cathedral). Dominique-Marie David was appointed as Archbishop of Monaco by Pope Francis on 21 January 2020.

== History ==
Pope Clement VII visited in 1532.

It was established as a pre-diocesan jurisdiction on 30 April 1868, as the Territorial Abbacy of Saints-Nicholas-et-Benoît, on territory split off from the Diocese of Nice.

It was promoted as the Diocese of Monaco by Pope Leo XIII on 15 March 1887, and it was elevated to the rank of an archdiocese by Pope John Paul II on 30 July 1981.

Pope Leo XIV visited Monaco on 28 March 2026. The visit was part of the ongoing, centuries-old ties that bind the Grimaldi dynasty, which has reigned over Monaco since 1297, to the Successors of Peter. It also aimed to strengthen the “long-standing and trusting” diplomatic relations, according to the press office of the Prince’s Palace, between the two smallest states in the world.

== Ordinaries ==
Abbots Ordinary of Saints-Nicholas-et-Benoît

- Romarico Flugi d’Aspermont, Subiaco Cassinese Benedictines (O.S.B. Subl.) (1868.05.21 – 1871)
- Léandre de Dou, O.S.B. Subl. (1871–1874)
- Hildebrand Marie Dell’Oro di Giosué, O.S.B. Subl. (1874–1875)
- Apostolic Administrator Lorenzo Battista Biale (1875 – death 1877), while Bishop of Ventimiglia (Italy) (1837.05.19 – death 1877)
- Apostolic Administrator Charles-Bonaventure-François Theuret (1878.07.15 – 1887.03.15 see below), Titular Bishop of Hermopolis Maior (1878.07.15 – 1887.03.15)

Bishops of Monaco

- Charles-Bonaventure-François Theuret (see above 1887.03.15 – death 1901.11.11)
- Jean-Charles Arnal du Curel (1903.10.02 – death 1915.06.06)
- Gustave Vié (1916.05.08 – death 1918.07.10)
- Georges-Prudent-Marie Bruley des Varannes (1920.12.16 – 1924.02.13), emeritate as Titular Archbishop of Claudiopolis in Honoriade (1924.02.13 – death 1943.05.29)
- Auguste-Maurice Clément (1924.04.25 – 1936.03.02), emeritate as Titular Bishop of Algiza (1936.03.02 – death 1939.03.03)
- Pierre-Maurice-Marie Rivière (1936.03.02 – 1953.05.13), emeritate as Titular Archbishop of Anchialus (1953.05.13 – 1961.11.07)
- Gilles-Henri-Alexis Barthe (1953.05.13 – 1962.05.04), later Bishop of Fréjus–Toulon (France) (1962.05.04 – retired 1983.02.08)
- Jean-Édouard-Lucien Rupp (1962.06.09 – 1971.05.08); previously Titular Bishop of Arca in Phoenicia (1954.10.28 – 1962.06.09) & Auxiliary Bishop of France of the Eastern Rite (France) (1954.10.28 – 1962.06.09); later Apostolic Pro-Nuncio (papal diplomatic envoy) to Iraq (1971.05.08 – 1978), Titular Archbishop of Dionysiopolis (1971.05.08 – 1983.01.28), Apostolic Pro-Nuncio to Kuwait (1975–1978), Permanent Observer to Office of the United Nations and Specialized Institutions in Geneva (UNOG) (1978 – retired 1980)
- Edmond-Marie-Henri Abelé (1972.06.27 – 1980.12.01), later Bishop of Digne (France) (1980.12.01 – 1987.06.02)

Archbishops of Monaco

- Charles Amarin Brand (1981.07.30 – 1984.07.16); previously Titular Bishop of Uthina (1971.12.28 – 1981.07.30) & Auxiliary Bishop of Fréjus–Toulon (France) (1971.12.28 – 1976.11.18), Auxiliary Bishop of Strasbourg (France) (1976.11.18 – 1981.07.30); later Archbishop-Bishop of Strasbourg (1984.07.16 – 1988.06.01), Vice-President of Council of European Bishops’ Conferences (1986–1990), Archbishop of Strasbourg (France) (1988.06.01 – 1997.10.23), President of Council of European Bishops’ Conferences (1990–1993)
- Joseph-Marie Sardou, Congregation of the Sacred Heart of Jesus (T.D.) (1985.05.31 – retired 2000.05.16)
- Bernard Barsi (16 May 2000 – 21 January 2020)
- Dominique-Marie David (21 January 2020 – present)

== Parishes ==
There are five parish churches: Saint-Charles Church, Church St. Devote, Saint Martin Church and Saint Nicholas Church. Chapels include: Chapel of Mercy, Chapel of the Sacred Heart and the Carmelite Chapel.

On Sunday 13 November 2011, the parish church of Saint Martin celebrated its centenary in the presence of Prince Albert II and Princess Charlene, with Princess Caroline and Princess Alexandra of Hanover. Archbishop Barsi blessed the Byzantine cross and the third bell named "Alexandra".

== See also ==
- Catholic Church in Monaco
- List of Catholic dioceses in Europe
