= Death and funeral of Princess Grace of Monaco =

1982 funeral of Princess Grace of Monaco

Funeral of Princess Grace of Monaco
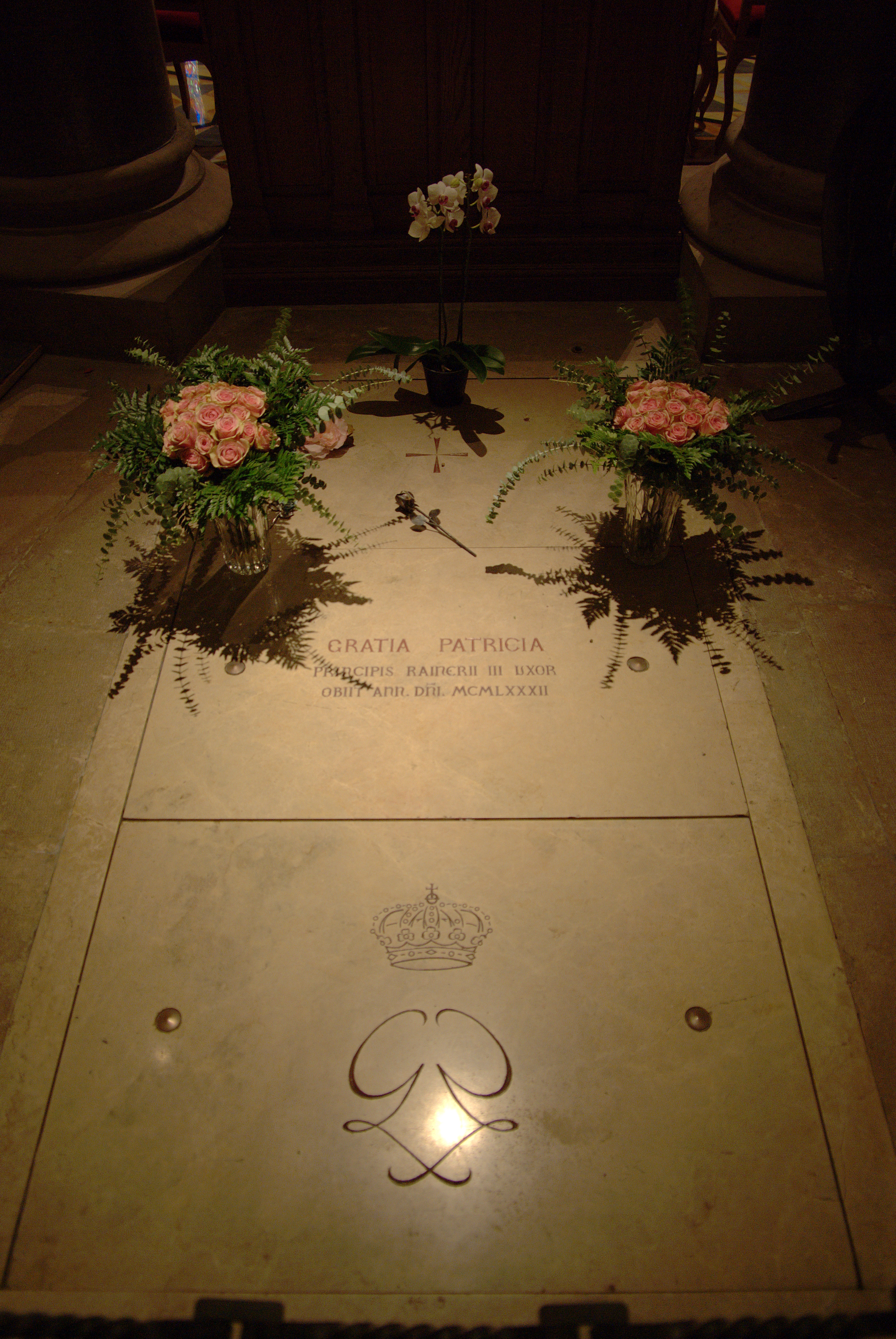
- The tomb of Gratia Patricia ('Grace Patricia' in Latin), Princess of Monaco
- Date: 18 September 1982; 43 years ago
- Location: Cathedral of Our Lady Immaculate, Monaco-Ville
- Participants: Princely Family of Monaco

The funeral of Princess Grace of Monaco took place at the Cathedral of Our Lady Immaculate in Monaco-Ville on September 18, 1982. Princess Grace had succumbed to injuries resulting from a car crash on September 14, at the age of 52. An estimated 26,000 people paid their respects as she lay in state at the Palatine Chapel at the Prince's Palace of Monaco before the ceremony, a requiem Mass.

== Death ==
On September 13, 1982, Grace suffered a mild cerebral hemorrhage while driving back to Monaco from her country home in Roc Agel. As a result, she lost control of her 1972 Rover P6 3500. (Note: The following references were used to determine the automobile details: Model: Age and marque: Platform:) and drove off the steep, winding road, and the car tumbled 30.5 metres (100 ft) down the mountainside. Her daughter Stéphanie, who was in the passenger seat, unsuccessfully tried to regain control of the car.

The Princess was taken to the Monaco Hospital (later named the Princess Grace Hospital Centre) with injuries to the brain and thorax and a fractured femur. Initially, that afternoon, she was officially diagnosed with a cerebral hemorrhage and was said to be able to make a full recovery before a second, more severe, hemorrhage struck while at the hospital. She was subsequently declared brain dead. With no reasonable chance of recovery, she died the following night at 10:55 p.m. after Rainier decided to turn off her life support.

== Funeral service ==
Princess Grace's body lay in state in the Ardent Chapel in the Grimaldi Palace, where she had lived for 26 years. She was dressed in a high-necked white lace dress and lay on a quilt of orchids. Afterwards, she was transported by a funeral cortege led by her husband, Prince Rainier III, and her children, Prince Albert and Princess Caroline through the streets of Monaco-Ville from the palace to the cathedral. Her youngest daughter, Princess Stéphanie, was unable to attend, still recovering from injuries sustained in the car accident.

The homily was delivered by Charles Amarin Brand, the Archbishop of Monaco. Brand stated in his homily that people were "united in pain" and emphasised the "senselessness and inexplicable nature" of "the rupture of the destiny of this humanly exceptional, religiously exceptional person". Brand said the Princess's Roman Catholic faith "modeled, indeed sculpted, not only the public person, but the deep personality of her being" and that her accident "results in stupefaction, and provides no answers to the questions of life, suffering, separation and death". The gospel reading was "In my Father's house are many mansions...I go to prepare a place for you" from John 14.

The music that accompanied the mass included an excerpt from Joseph Haydn's Symphony No. 4, Samuel Barber's Adagio for Strings and four pieces by Johann Sebastian Bach.

Grace's coffin was draped in the Monégasque flag and lay in the cathedral's Chapel of the Princes during the ceremony. A second mass was offered after the ceremony for Monégasque citizens. The Interment of the coffin in the Grimaldi family vault in the apse of the cathedral was scheduled for the following week, because the funeral service ran over.

Prince Rainier was seated with Princess Caroline and Prince Albert at the ceremony. Grace's siblings, her brother John B. 'Kell' Kelly Jr., and her sisters Lizanne and Peggy, sat behind the Monégasque princely family. Four of Grace's friends who had served as bridesmaids during her wedding were in attendance, as was her former agent Jay Kanter and former co-star Cary Grant. The representatives of several reigning and non-reigning royal families and governments were also in attendance. Nancy Reagan, the First Lady of the United States, was a friend of Grace's and led the American delegation. She was seated with Danielle Mitterrand, wife of the President of France François Mitterrand, and Diana, Princess of Wales, wife of Charles, Prince of Wales, on behalf of Queen Elizabeth II. Diana had previously met Princess Grace at a music recital at Goldsmith's Hall in the City of London.

The rest of the American delegation consisted of the United States Secretary of the Navy John F. Lehman Jr.; Dick Thornburgh, the Governor of Pennsylvania; Evan G. Galbraith, the United States Ambassador to France; the Pennsylvanian Representative Thomas M. Foglietta; and Jacklyn Anne Cahill, the State Department Officer in charge of French and Monacan Affairs.

Other notable attendees included singer Eddie Fisher, Barbara Sinatra, the wife of the singer Frank Sinatra, and Jackie Stewart, the racing driver.

== Attendees ==
=== Family ===
==== House of Grimaldi ====
- The Prince of Monaco, Princess Grace's widower
  - Princess Caroline of Monaco, Princess Grace's daughter
  - The Hereditary Prince of Monaco, Princess Grace's son

==== Kelly family ====
- Margaret Conlin, Princess Grace's sister
- John B. Kelly Jr., Princess Grace's brother
- Elizabeth Anne Levine, Princess Grace's sister

=== Foreign royalty ===
==== Members of reigning royal families ====
- (Belgium) The King and Queen of the Belgians
- (Belgium) The Prince and Princess of Liège
- Princess Benedikte of Denmark (representing the Queen of Denmark)
- Prince Philipp of Liechtenstein (representing the Prince of Liechtenstein)
- The Grand Duchess of Luxembourg (representing the Grand Duke of Luxembourg)
- The Queen and Prince Consort of the Netherlands
- The Count of Barcelona (representing the King of Spain)
- The Duke of Halland (representing the King of Sweden)
- The Princess of Wales (representing the Queen of the United Kingdom)

==== Members of non-reigning royal families ====
- Queen Anne-Marie of Greece
- Empress Farah Pahlavi of Iran
- King Michael I and Queen Anne of Romania
- King Fuad II of Egypt
- The Duke of Aosta
- Grand Duke Vladimir Kirillovich of Russia
- The Aga Khan and Begum Aga Khan

=== Non-royal dignitaries ===
- (Republic of Ireland) Patrick Hillery, President of Ireland
- Danielle Mitterrand, First Lady of France, (representing the President François Mitterrand)
  - (France) Claude Pompidou, widow of French President Georges Pompidou
  - (France) Claude Cheysson, Minister of Foreign Affairs
  - (France) Jack Lang, Minister of Culture
- (Holy See) Archbishop Jacques-Paul Martin, Prefect Emeritus of the Papal Household
- Nancy Reagan, First Lady of the United States (representing her husband President Ronald Reagan)

=== Other notable attendees ===
- Cary Grant
- James Stewart
- Jackie Stewart

== Sources ==
- Brown, Adele (February 1, 2002). What a Way to Go: Fabulous Funerals of the Famous and Infamous. Chronicle Books. ISBN 978-0-8118-2750-8.
- Brown, Craig (August 20, 2013). Hello Goodbye Hello: A Circle of 101 Remarkable Meetings. Simon and Schuster. pp. 249–. ISBN 978-1-4516-8451-3.
- Brown, Tina (May 31, 2011). The Diana Chronicles. Random House. pp. 190–. ISBN 978-1-4464-7411-2.
- Dherbier, Yann-Brice; Verlhac, Pierre-Henri (2007). Grace Kelly: A Life in Pictures. Pavilion. ISBN 978-1-86205-776-0.
- Edwards, Anne (September 1, 2017). The Grimaldis of Monaco: Centuries of Scandal, Years of Grace. Lyons Press. p. 302. ISBN 978-1-4930-2922-8.
- Fisher, Carrie (February 2, 2012). Wishful Drinking. Simon and Schuster. ISBN 978-1-4711-0109-0.
- Leigh, Wendy (2007). True Grace: The Life and Times of an American Princess. New York: Thomas Dunne Books. ISBN 978-0-312-34236-4.
- MacGuire, James P. (March 15, 2017). Real Lace Revisited: Inside the Hidden World of America's Irish Aristocracy. Rowman & Littlefield. pp. 62–. ISBN 978-1-4930-2492-6.
- Parish, James Robert (November 19, 2001). The Hollywood Book of Death: The Bizarre, Often Sordid, Passings of More than 125 American Movie and TV Idols. McGraw Hill Professional. ISBN 978-0-07-178476-4.
- Planet, Lonely; McNaughtan, Hugh; Berry, Oliver; Clark, Gregor (January 1, 2019). Lonely Planet Provence & the Cote d'Azur. Lonely Planet. ISBN 978-1-78868-173-5.
- Weekly Compilation of Presidential Documents. Office of the Federal Register, National Archives and Records Service, General Services Administration. 1982.
- Werner, Jennifer (2014). Grace Kelly of Monaco: The Inspiring Story of How an American Film Star Became a Princess. BookCaps Study Guides. pp. 40–44. ISBN 978-1-62917-248-4.
