= Joseph-Marie Sardou =

French Roman Catholic archbishop

Joseph-Marie Sardou S.C.J.
- Archbishop of Monaco
- Church: Catholic Church
- Archdiocese: Archdiocese of Monaco
- In office: 31 May 1985 – 16 May 2000
- Predecessor: Charles Amarin Brand
- Successor: Bernard Barsi

Orders
- Ordination: 12 March 1949
- Consecration: 30 September 1985 by Bernardin Gantin

Personal details
- Born: 25 October 1922 Marseille, Bouches-du-Rhône, France
- Died: 19 September 2009 (aged 86)

Joseph-Marie Sardou, S.C.J. (25 October 1922 – 19 September 2009) was a French Roman Catholic archbishop.

Ordained to the priesthood on 12 May 1949, Sardou was appointed Archbishop of the Roman Catholic Archdiocese of Monaco, by Pope John Paul II on 31 May 1985 and was ordained a bishop on 30 September 1985. Archbishop Sardou retired on 16 May 2000, and died on 19 September 2009. His successor was Bernard Barsi.

In 1990, Bishop Joseph-Marie Sardou founded the Catholic charity organisation Caritas Monaco.

== Notes ==
Catholic Church titles
Preceded by Charles Amarin Brand	Archbishop of Monaco; 31 May 1985 – 16 May 2000	Succeeded by Bernard Barsi
