= Charles Amarin Brand =

French prelate of the Roman Catholic Church

His Excellency Charles Amarin Brand
- Archbishop of Strasbourg
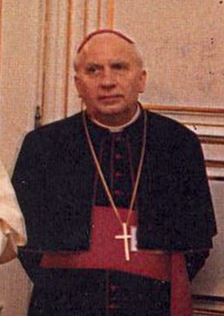
- Charles-Amarin Brand in 1988
- Church: Roman Catholic Church
- See: Archdiocese of Strasbourg
- In office: 1984 - 1997
- Predecessor: Léon-Arthur-Auguste Elchinger
- Successor: Joseph Pierre Aimé Marie Doré

Orders
- Ordination: 11 July 1943
- Consecration: 13 February 1972

Personal details
- Born: 27 June 1920 Mulhouse, France
- Died: 31 March 2013 (aged 92) Toulouse, France

Charles-Amarin Brand (27 June 1920 – 31 March 2013) was a French prelate of the Roman Catholic Church.

== Biography ==
Brand was born in Mulhouse, France, and was ordained a priest on 11 July 1943 from the Archdiocese of Strasbourg. He was appointed auxiliary archbishop of the Diocese of Fréjus-Toulon on 28 December 1971, as well as titular bishop of Uthina, and was ordained bishop on 13 February 1972. Brand was then appointed auxiliary bishop of the Archdiocese of Strasbourg on 18 November 1976. Brand was archbishop of the Archdiocese of Monaco from 30 July 1981 to 16 July 1984, when he was appointed Archbishop of Archdiocese of Strasbourg. He served at Strasbourg until his retirement on 23 October 1997. He died in 2013.

Catholic Church titles
Preceded by Edmond-Marie-Henri Abelé as Bishop of Monaco	Archbishop of Monaco; 1981–1984	Succeeded by Joseph-Marie Sardou
Preceded by Leon Arthur Elchinger	Archbishop of Strasbourg; 1984–1997	Succeeded by Joseph Doré
