= Euro gold and silver commemorative coins (Monaco) =

Gold and silver issues of coins by Monaco

Principality of Monaco Principauté de Monaco
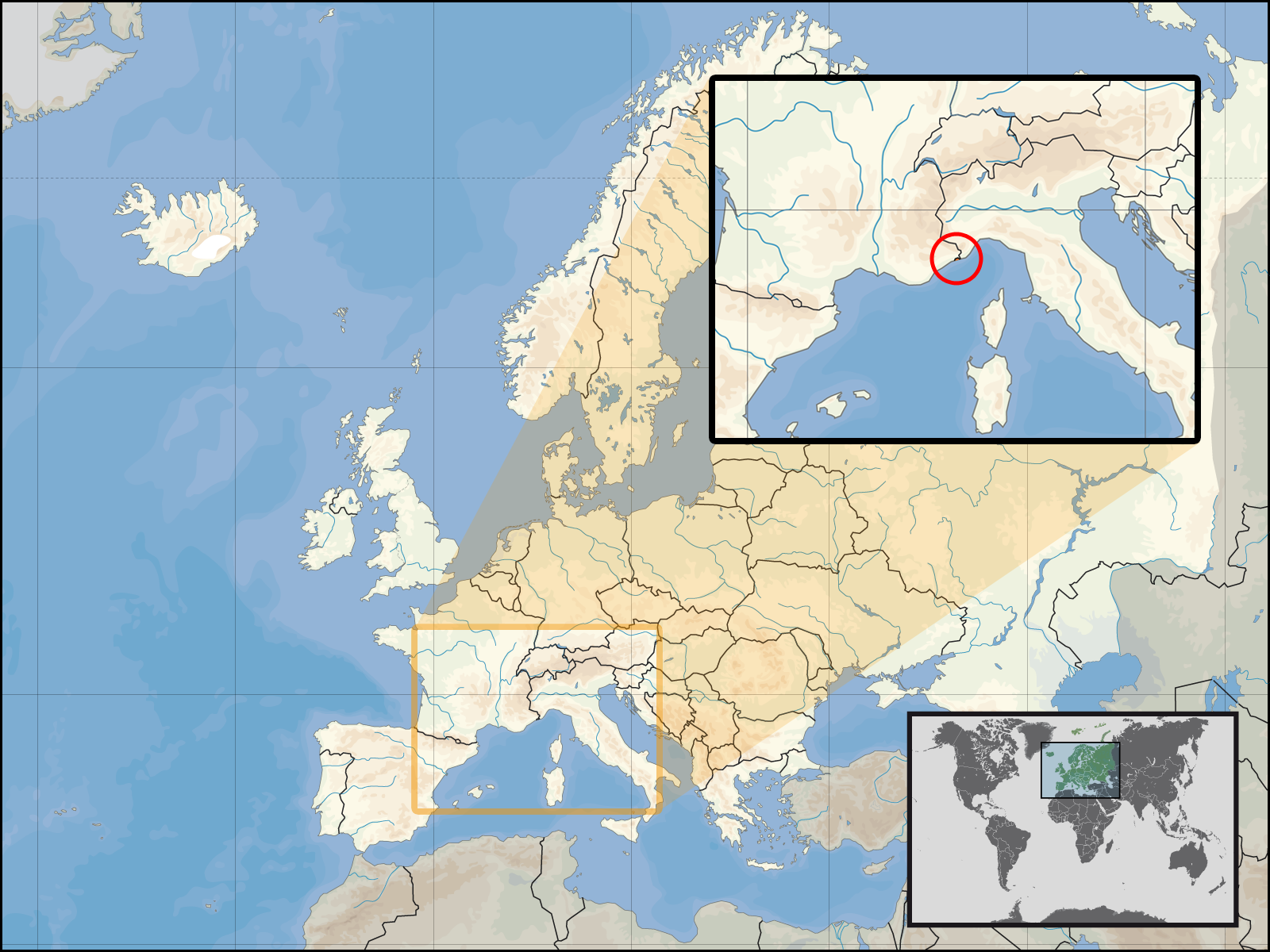
- ISO 3166 code: MC

Euro gold and silver commemorative coins are special euro coins minted and issued by member states of the Eurozone, mainly in gold and silver, although other precious metals are also used in rare occasions. Monaco was one of the first countries allowed to introduced the euro (€) on 1 January 2002, although they are not officially part of the Eurozone. Since then, the Monnaie de Paris in France have been minting both normal issues of Monégasque euro coins, which are intended for circulation, and commemorative euro coins in gold and silver.

These special coins have a legal tender only in Monaco, unlike the normal issues of the Monegasque euro coins, which have a legal tender in every country of the Eurozone. This means that the commemorative coins made of gold and silver cannot be used as money in other countries. Furthermore, as their bullion value and collectable value generally vastly exceeds their face value, these coins are not intended to be used as means of payment at all—although it remains possible. For this reason, they are usually named collectors' coins.

The coins usually commemorate the anniversaries of historical events or draw attention to current events of special importance. Monaco mints one type of these coins on average per year, in both gold and silver, with face value ranging from 5 to 100 euros.

== Summary ==
As of 28 December 2008, seven variations of Monegasque euro commemorative coins have been minted: one in 2002, two in 2003, one in 2004, one in 2005 and two in 2008. These special high-value commemorative coins are not to be confused with €2 commemorative coins, which are coins designated for circulation and do have legal tender status in all countries of the Eurozone.

The following table shows the number of coins minted per year. In the first section, the coins are grouped by the metal used, while in the second section they are grouped by their face value.

Year	Issues	By metal			By face value			
Year	Issues	Gold	Silver	Others	€100	€20	€10	€5
2002	1	1	–	–	–	1	–	–
2003	2	1	1	–	1	–	1	–
2004	1	–	1	–	–	–	–	1
2005	1	1	–	–	–	–	1	–
2006	0	–	–	–	–	–	–	–
2007	0	–	–	–	–	–	–	–
2008	2	1	1	–	–	1	–	1
Total	7	4	3	0	1	2	2	2
Coins were minted / No coins were minted

== 2002 coinage ==
Golden 20 euro
Designer: N/A		Mint: Monnaie de Paris	
Value: €20	Alloy: Au 900 (gold)	Quantity: 3,500	Quality: Proof
Issued: 2002	Diameter: 21 mm (0.83 in)	Weight: 6.45 g (0.23 oz; 0.21 ozt)	Market price: €720-€1,150
This was the first euro commemorative coin issued by Monaco. On the obverse the effigy of ruling Prince Rainier III is depicted. On the reverse the Grimaldi's Coat of Arms is shown surrounded by the 12 stars representing the European Union and its face value of €20.

== 2003 coinage ==
Silver 10 euro
Designer: N/A		Mint: Monnaie de Paris	
Value: €10	Alloy: Ag 900 (silver)	Quantity: 4,000	Quality: Proof
Issued: 2003	Diameter: 37 mm (1.46 in)	Weight: 25 g (0.88 oz; 0.80 ozt)	Market price: €165-€185
This coin was issued to celebrate the 80th birthday of Prince Rainier III. On the obverse his effigy with the effigy of the Crown Prince Albert II is depicted. On the reverse the Grimaldi's Coat of Arms is shown; around it the words "Principauté de Monaco" (Principality of Monaco) with its face value of €10.
Golden 100 euro
Designer: N/A		Mint: Monnaie de Paris	
Value: €100	Alloy: Au 900 (gold)	Quantity: 1,000	Quality: Proof
Issued: 2003	Diameter: 35 mm (1.38 in)	Weight: 32 g (1.13 oz; 1.03 ozt)	Market price: €1,900-€2,350
This coin was issued to celebrate the 80th anniversary of Prince Rainier III. On the obverse, the effigy of Prince Rainier III is depicted. In reverse, the official Grimaldi's seal is shown; around it the words "Principauté de Monaco" (Principality of Monaco) with its face value of €100.

== 2004 coinage ==
1700th anniversary of Sainte Dévote's death
Designer: N/A		Mint: Monnaie de Paris	
Value: €5	Alloy: Ag 900 (silver)	Quantity: 15,000	Quality: Proof
Issued: 2004	Diameter: 29 mm (1.14 in)	Weight: 12 g (0.42 oz; 0.39 ozt)	Market price: €400-€465
Saint Devota (French: Sainte Dévote) (d. ca. 303 AD) is the patron saint of Corsica and Monaco. Legend has it that she was killed during the persecutions of Diocletian and Maximian. She is sometimes identified with another Corsican saint named Julia, who was described in Latin as Deo devota ("devoted to God"). This coin was issued to commemorate the 1700th anniversary of her death. On the obverse, an effigy of Prince Rainier III is depicted. On the reverse a statue of the saint is present. Next to it, a representation of the legendary dove safely guiding the boat to the coast of Monaco is present.

== 2005 coinage ==
Prince Rainier III
Designer: N/A		Mint: Monnaie de Paris	
Value: €10	Alloy: Au 900 (gold)	Quantity: 3,313	Quality: Proof
Issued: 2005	Diameter: 18 mm (0.71 in)	Weight: 3.22 g (0.11 oz; 0.10 ozt)	Market price: €189-€300
This coin was issued marking the death of Prince Rainier III. On the obverse the former prince is depicted. On the reverse the Grimaldi's Coat of Arms is shown with the coin face value of €10.

== 2008 coinage ==
Prince Albert II (silver)
Designer: N/A		Mint: Monnaie de Paris		
Value: €10	Alloy: Ag 900 (silver)	Quantity: 4,000	Quality: Proof	
Issued: 2011	Diameter: 37 mm (1.46 in)	Weight: 25 g (0.88 oz; 0.80 ozt)	Issue value: €110 Market price: €375-€450	Prince Albert II (gold)
Designer: N/A		Mint: Monnaie de Paris		
On the obverse, the effigy of Prince Albert II is depicted together with his name on the top of the coin. On the reverse the Grimaldi's Coat of Arms is shown; around it the words "Principauté de Monaco" (Principality of Monaco) can be seen with its face value of €5 and €20 respectively.

== 2011 coinage ==
Prince Albert II (silver)
Designer: N/A		Mint: Monnaie de Paris	
Value: €10	Alloy: Ag 900 (silver)	Quantity: 4,000	Quality: Proof
Issued: 2011	Diameter: 37 mm (1.46 in)	Weight: 25 g (0.88 oz; 0.80 ozt)	Issue value: €110 Market price: €375-€450
Designer: N/A		Mint: Monnaie de Paris	
On the obverse, the conjoined effigies of Albert II, Prince of Monaco and Princess Charlene, are depicted together with the text PRINCIPAUTE DE MONACO (Principality of Monaco) above the portraits. On the reverse the Crowned monograms of the Princley couple are positioned to the right The denomination of €10 is seen to the left of the monograms and the year of issue, 2011 is below the primary design. His Serene Hignness Prince Albert II and his fiancé Miss Charlene Wittstock of South Africa were married in a civil ceremony in Monte Carlo on 1 July 2011 and in a religious ceremony at the Princley Palace on 2 July. A €2 circulation and collector's coin with the similar design was also issued to mark the occasion.

== 2012 coinage ==
Prince Albert II (silver)
Designer: N/A		Mint: Monnaie de Paris	
Value: €10	Alloy: Ag 900 (silver)	Quantity: 6,500	Quality: Proof
Issued: 2012	Diameter: 37 mm (1.46 in)	Weight: 25 g (0.88 oz; 0.80 ozt)	Issue value: €110 Market price: €110-€125
Designer: N/A		Mint: Monnaie de Paris	
On the obverse, the profile portrait of Honore II, Prince of Monaco above the portrait is the text "1612 - HONORE II PRINCE DE MONACO - 2012". On the reverse the Crowned crest of Monaco with the motto "DEO JUVANTE" The denomination of €10 is seen to the left of the crest. The text "PRINCIPAUTE DE MONACO" is placed along the top rim above the crest. The silver collector's coin was issued on 1 December to mark the 400th anniversary of the first use of the title "Sovereign Prince" by Honore II, Lord of Monaco who reigned from 1604 until 1662.
