= Gustave Vié =

French Catholic bishop

- Bishop of Monaco
- Church: Catholic Church
- Diocese: Monaco
- Appointed: 8 May 1916
- Term ended: 10 July 1918
- Predecessor: Jean-Charles Arnal du Curel
- Successor: Georges Bruley des Varannes

Orders
- Ordination: 21 December 1872
- Consecration: 25 July 1916 by Stanislas Touchet

Personal details
- Born: 4 June 1849 Escrennes, French Second Republic
- Died: 10 July 1918 (aged 69)

Gustave Vié (4 June 1849 – 10 July 1918) was a French Roman Catholic prelate who was the bishop of the Roman Catholic Diocese of Monaco from 1916 to his death in 1918.
