= Léon Arthur Elchinger =

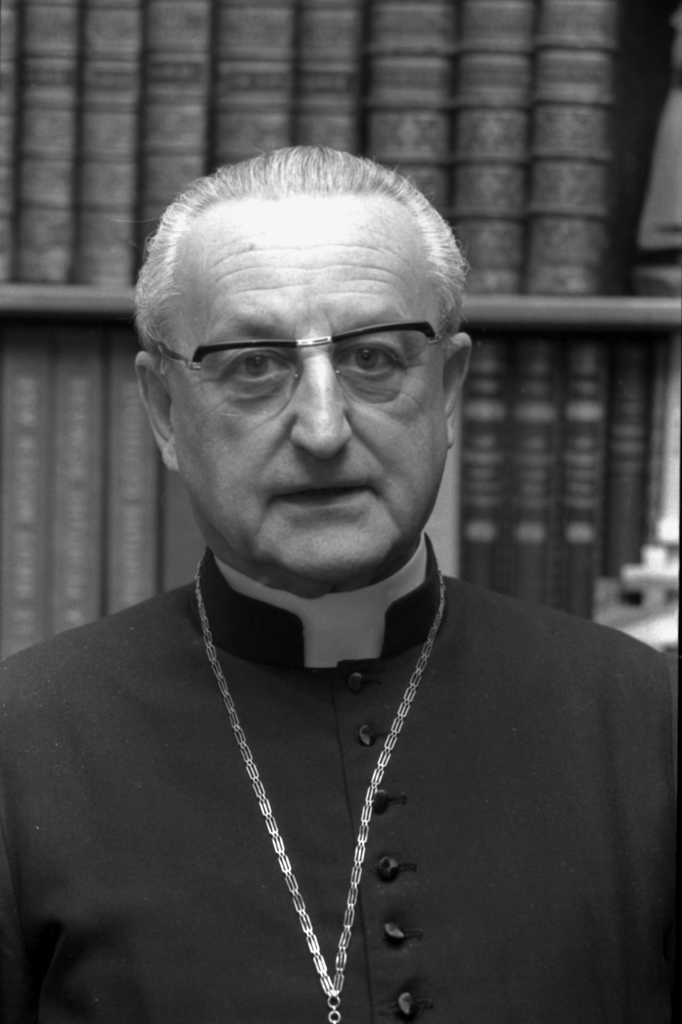
Léon-Arthur Elchinger,1980.

Léon-Arthur Elchinger (2 July 1908, in Soufflenheim – 30 June 1998, in Strasbourg) was the Bishop of Strasbourg from 1967 to 1984.

== Diploma ==
- Ph.D. in theology and in scholasticism philosophia
- Bachelor of Arts

== Career in the Order ==
- 1931: Ordained Catholic priest in April, then nominated professor and director at the theological seminary in Strasbourg
- 1938: Military chaplain in Strasbourg
- 1941: Nominated Senior of the theological seminary of Strasbourg; withdrawn back to Clermont-Ferrand during World War II
- 1945: Nominated Diocesan director of the catholic pedagogy of Strasbourg
- 1947: Nominated Canon of the Strasbourg Cathedral
- 1958: Nominated ancillary Bishop and coadjutor Mgr Weber
- 1962–1965: Participated in the Second Vatican Council; made a notable intercession on behalf of the rehabilitation of Galileo Galilei
- 1967: Nominated Bishop of Strasbourg
- 1984: Resigned as Bishop of Strasbourg, being replaced by Msgr. Charles-Amarin Brand
- 1984–1998: Very active during his retirement, he wrote several books and appeared often in the news media. He died two days before his 90th birthday.

== Bibliography ==
- By Léon-Arthur Elchinger :
  - Urgence du vrai, Cri d'un évêque - Mame, collection Religion
  - Je plaide pour l'homme - Fayard, collection Religion
  - Liberté d'un Evêque - Centurion
  - David contre Goliath aujourd'hui - Fayard, collection Christianime
  - Risquer la vérité, les racines de l'avenir - Fayard, collection Christianime
  - L'âme de l'Alsace et son avenir - La Nuée Bleue
  - Paroles pour la France - Salvator

== Controversy ==
In April 1981, Elchinger remarked at a press conference, "I consider homosexuality a sickness." This prompted the concentration camp deportee, Pierre Seel, to write an open letter to the Bishop on 18 November, and to speak publicly for the first time about his experiences and wartime abuses he had faced as a homosexual.

== See also ==
- Archbishops of Strasbourg

Catholic Church titles
Preceded by Jean Julien Weber	Bishop of Strasbourg; 1967-1984	Succeeded by Charles Amarin Brand
