= Cathedral of Our Lady Immaculate =

Catholic church building in Monaco

- Cathédrale de Notre-Dame-Immaculée
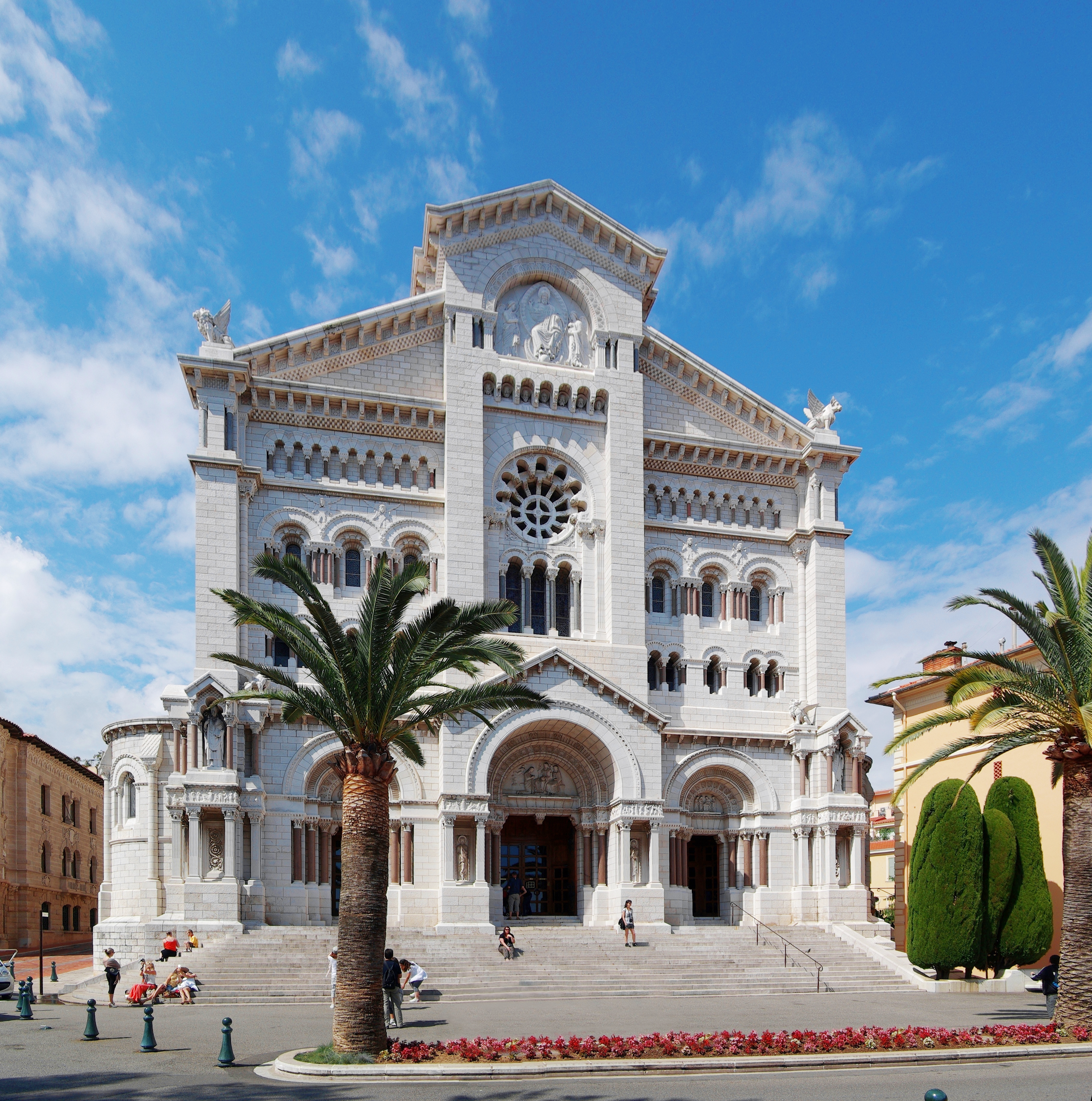
- Cathedral of Our Lady Immaculate
- 43°43′49″N 7°25′22″E
- Location: Monaco-Ville, Monaco
- Denomination: Roman Catholic Church

History
- Consecrated: 11 June 1911

Architecture
- Architectural type: Romanesque Revival
- Groundbreaking: 1875
- Completed: 1903

Administration
- Archdiocese: Monaco

Clergy
- Archbishop: Dominique-Marie David
- Rector: Daniel Deltreuil

The Cathedral of Our Lady Immaculate (French: Cathédrale de Notre-Dame-Immaculée; Latin: Cathedralis Templum de Nostra Domina Immaculata), formerly called the Cathedral of Saint Nicholas (demolished in 1874), or informally the Cathedral of Monaco (French: Cathédrale de Monaco), is the Roman Catholic cathedral of the Archdiocese of Monaco in the Monaco-Ville ward of Monaco. The cathedral is dedicated to the Blessed Virgin Mary under the venerated title of the Immaculate Conception.

== History ==
It was built from 1875 to 1903 and was consecrated on 11 June 1911. It is located on the site of the first parish church in Monaco, which was constructed in 1252 and dedicated to its patron Saint Nicholas. Notable within the shrine are the retable (circa 1500) to the right of the transept, the high altar, and the episcopal throne constructed in white Carrara marble.

The national shrine is where many of the Grimaldi family members are buried, including Prince Rainier III and his wife Grace, Princess of Monaco.

Pontifical services take place on the major religious festivals, such as the Feast of Sainte Dévote, patron saint of Monaco, (27 January) and the National Day of Monaco (19 November). On feast days and during religious music concerts, one can hear the four-manual organ, which was inaugurated in 1976.

From September through June, singers of the Cathedral Choir School perform during Catholic Mass every Sunday at 10:30 am. Services are also celebrated annually on 6 December for Saint Nicholas Day, when primary school children gather for a remembrance of the life of Saint Nicholas.

== Cathedral Clergy ==
Position	Name
Archdeacon and Cathedral Rector	Rev. Canon Daniel Deltreuil
Cathedral Vicar and Archdiocesan Master of Ceremonies	Rev. Fr. Luca Favretto
In Pastoral Service	Rev. Fr. Pierre-Emmanuel Pauchet

== Gallery ==
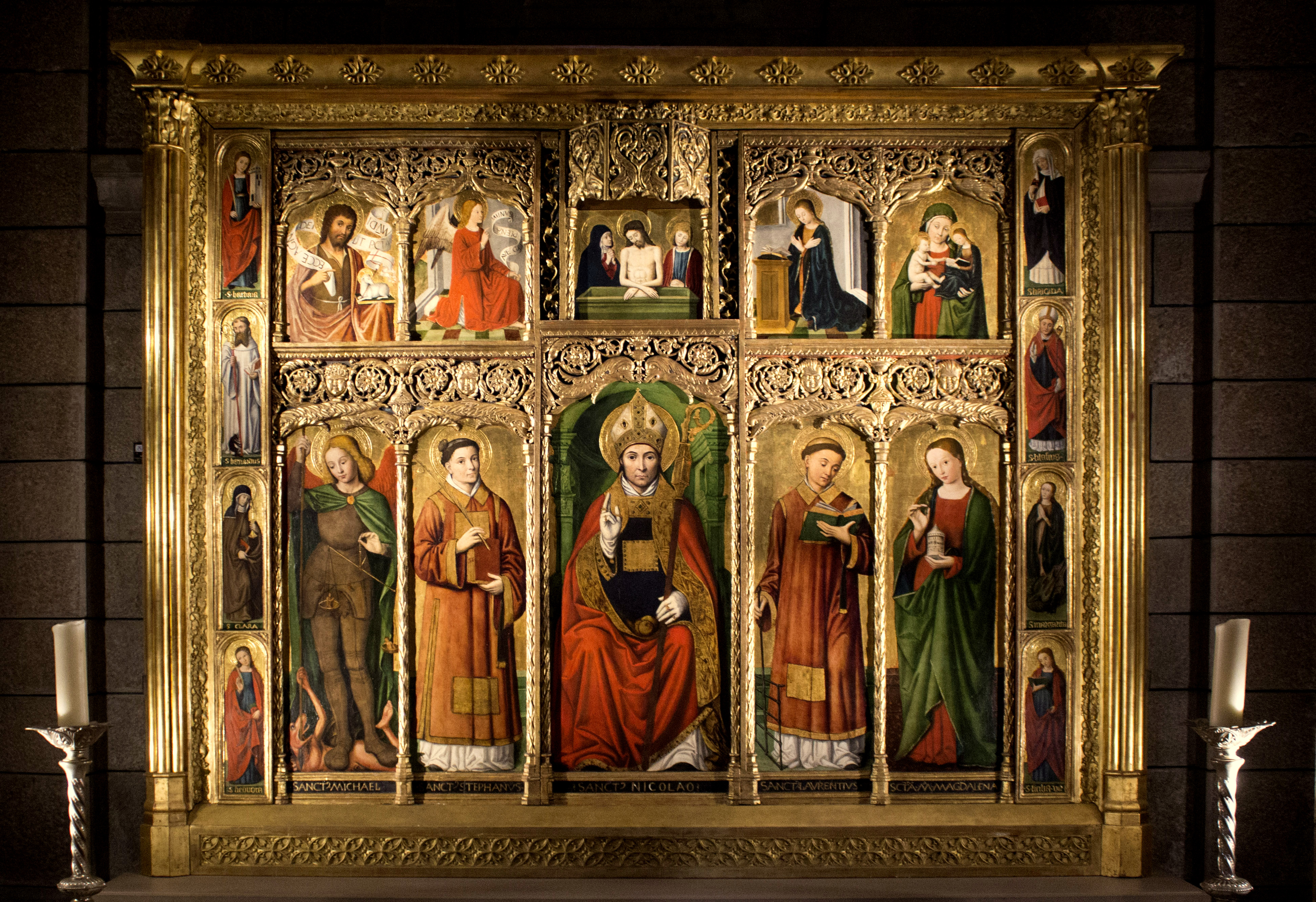
Altarpiece of St Nicolas by Ludovico Brea, 1500

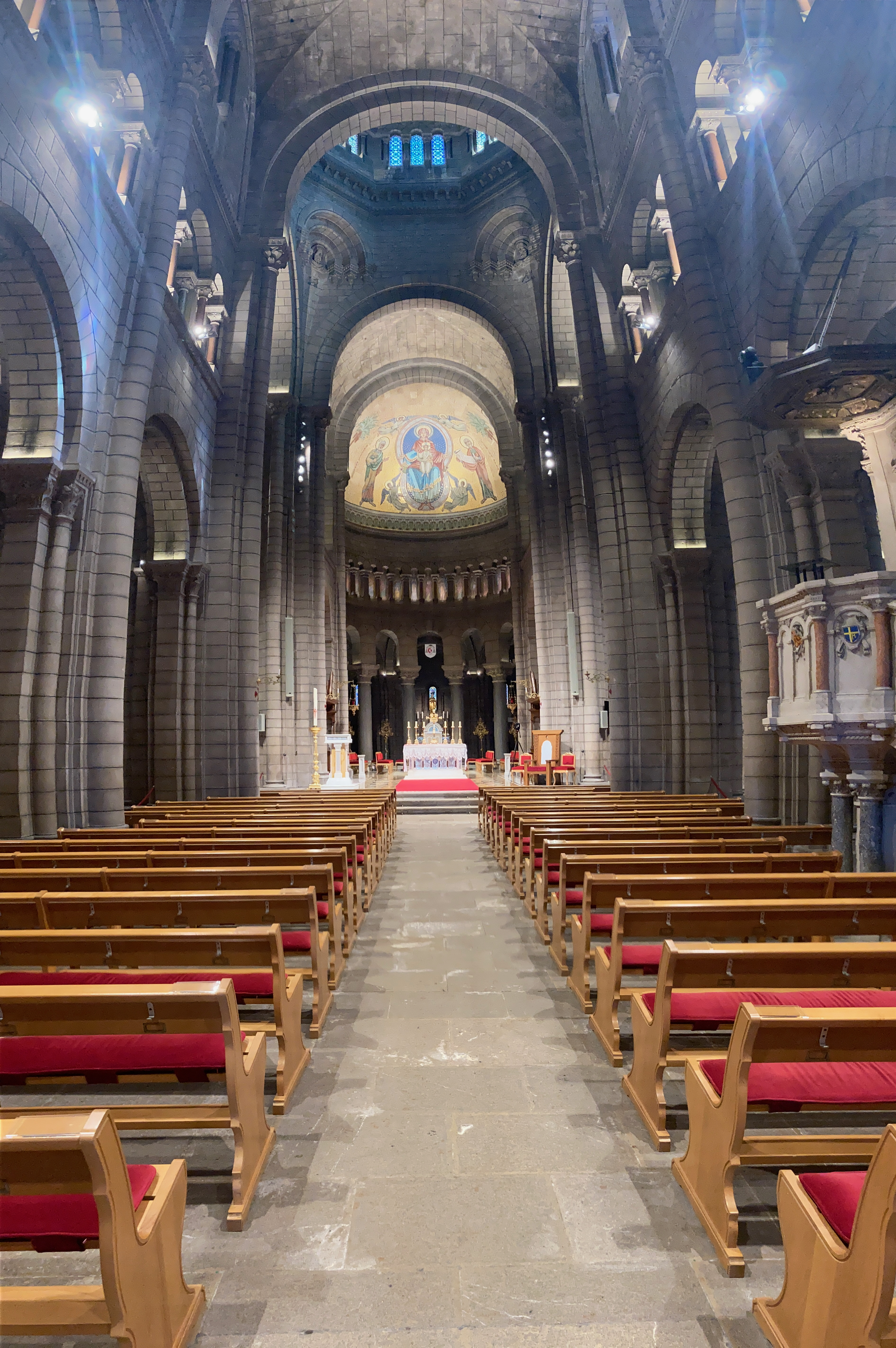
Interior of the cathedral
