= Bernard Barsi =

French Roman Catholic prelate (1942–2022)

His Excellency Bernard Barsi
- Archbishop of Monaco
- Appointed: 16 May 2000
- Term ended: 21 January 2020
- Predecessor: Joseph-Marie Sardou
- Successor: Dominique-Marie David

Orders
- Ordination: 28 June 1969 by Jean Mouisset
- Consecration: 8 October 2000 by Marc-Armand Lallier

Personal details
- Born: 4 August 1942 Nice, France
- Died: 28 December 2022 (aged 80) Nice, France
- Motto: INSTAURARE OMNIA IN CHRISTO

Bernard César Augustin Barsi (4 August 1942 – 28 December 2022) was a French prelate of the Catholic Church who was the archbishop of Monaco from 2000 to 2020.

== Biography ==
Barsi was born on 4 August 1942 in Nice, France. He was ordained a priest on 28 June 1969.

After his ordination, he served as a vicar at the parish of Saint-Etienne de Tinée in Nice from 1969 until 1972. From 1972 to 1982 he worked in the vocations office of the diocese. He was appointed pastor of La Trinité parish, serving in that capacity from 1982 to 1991. He was made vicar general of the diocese of Nice in 1991, and served in that position until 2000 with a brief interruption from 1997 to 1998, when he was administrator of the Diocese of Rennes.

Barsi was appointed the archbishop of Monaco on 16 May 2000. He was consecrated a bishop on 8 October of the same year. His principal consecrator was Jean Bonfils, S.M.A., Bishop of Nice, who was assisted by François Saint-Macary, the Archbishop of Rennes, and Joseph-Marie Sardou, S.C.J., then the Archbishop Emeritus of Monaco.

In 2003 he oversaw a Vatican investigation into abuse of choirboys in the 1970s in Rome. The result was inconclusive.

Barsi officiated at the funeral of Prince Rainier III in April 2005, and on 2 July 2011, he presided over the wedding of Prince Albert II and Charlene Wittstock.

Barsi was the Grand Prior of the Monaco Lieutenancy of the Equestrian Order of the Holy Sepulchre of Jerusalem.

Pope Francis accepted his resignation on 21 January 2020.

Barsi died of a heart attack on 28 December 2022, at the age of 80.

== Honours ==
- Monaco : Officer of the Order of Grimaldi (Nov. 2011)

Catholic Church titles
| Preceded by Joseph-Marie Sardou | Archbishop of Monaco; 16 May 2000 – 21 January 2020 | Succeeded by Dominique-Marie David |
