= Anchialos =

Anchialos or Anchialus may refer to:

- Anchialos (mythology), three characters in Greek mythology
- Anchialos, town in Thrace now known as Pomorie, Bulgaria
- Nea Anchialos, Greek town in Thessaly
- Anchialos, Thessaloniki, village in Greece
- 18263 Anchialos, asteroid
- Anchialus Glacier in Antarctica
