= Sainte-Dévote Chapel =

Chapel in Ravin de Sainte-Dévote, Monaco

Coordinates: 43.7375063°0′0″N 7.4209764°0′0″E

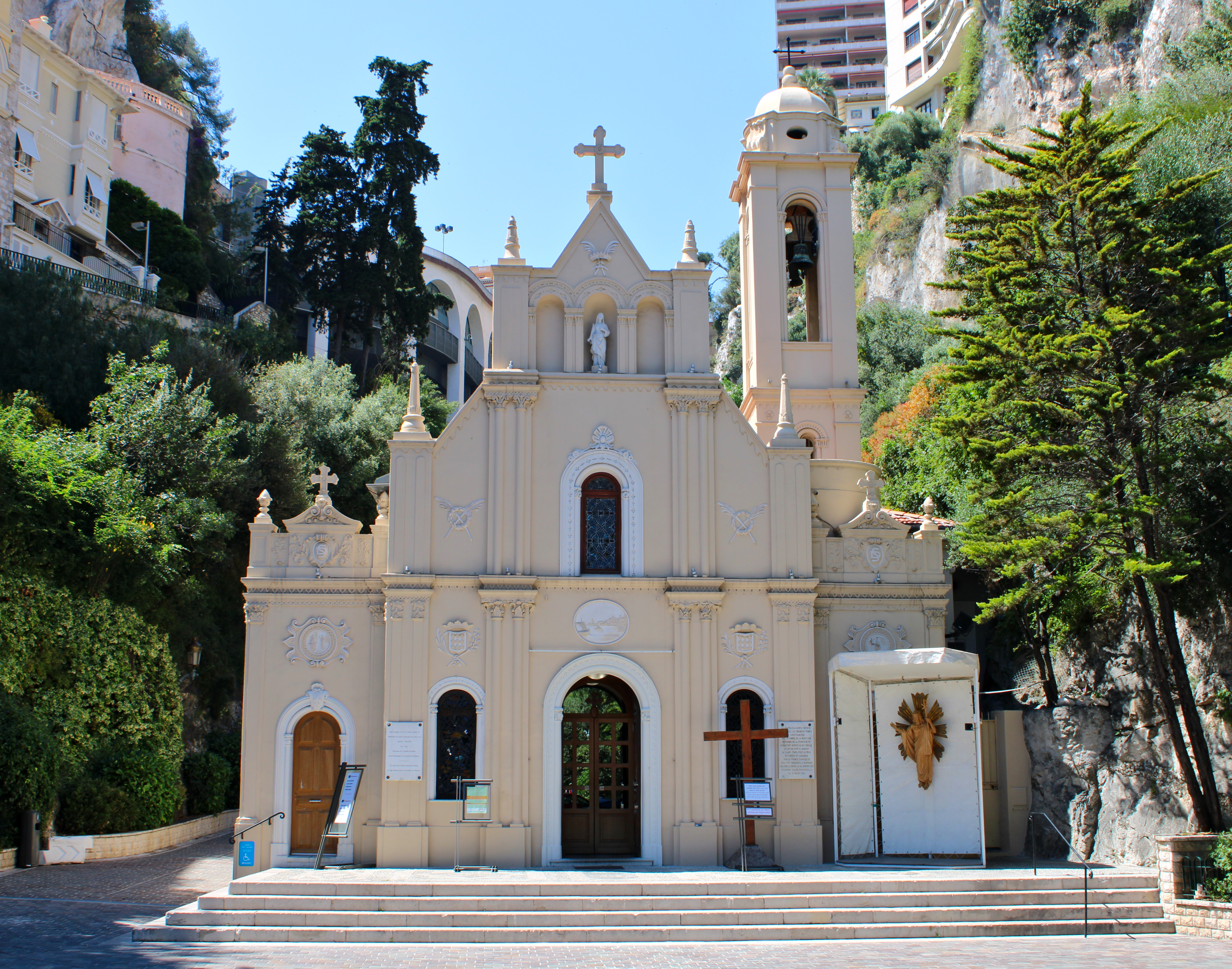
Sainte-Dévote Chapel

The Chapel of Sainte—Dévote (French: Chapelle Sainte Dévote; Ligurian: Geija de Santa Devotâ) is a Roman Catholic chapel dedicated to Saint Devota, the patron saint of Monaco, which lies in the Monégasque ward of Ravin de Sainte-Dévote.

The chapel was first mentioned in archived documents dated 1070, built against the wall of Vallon des Gaumates, on the space now occupied by the Chapel of Relics. It was restored in the 16th century. In 1606, Prince Honoré II added a span, followed by a porch in 1637. The façade was rebuilt in 1870 and refurbished further in 1891 in "18th-century Neo-Greek" style. The stained-glass windows were made by Nicolas Lorin of Chartres. The glass windows were destroyed during the bombing of Monaco during World War II and were restored by Fassi Cadet of Nice in 1948.

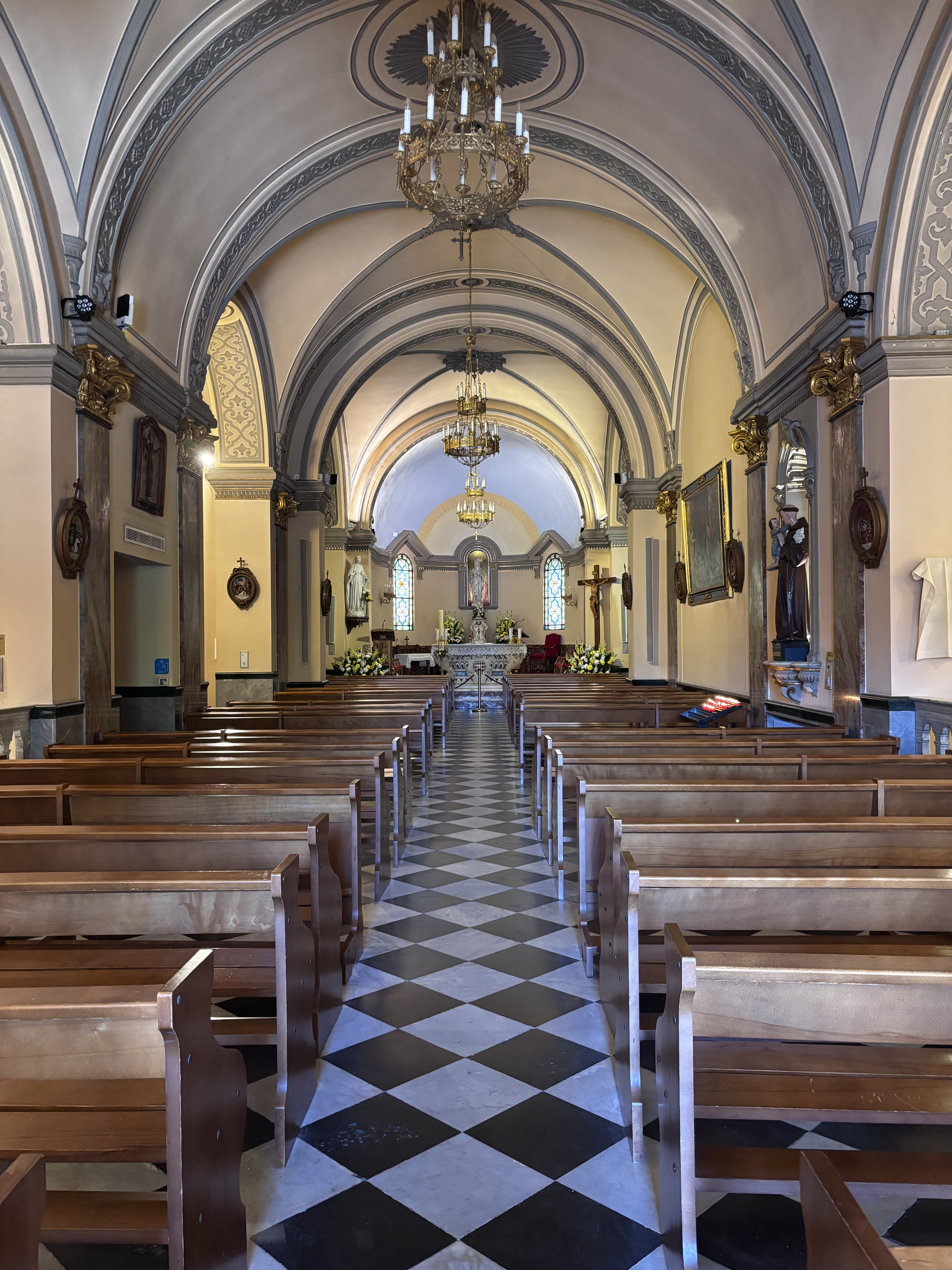
The interior of the chapel

The chapel became the parish church in 1887.

In Monegasque tradition, the bride of the Sovereign Prince of Monaco lays her bridal bouquet at the chapel after the wedding ceremony.

The name of the chapel is used to identify the first corner, "Sainte-Dévote", of the Monaco Grand Prix track, the Circuit de Monaco.

Caritas Monaco, a Monégasque Catholic charity organisation, is based in the chapel.
