= Ravin de Sainte-Dévote =

Ravin de Sainte-Dévote Valu̍n de Santa Devota (Monégasque)
- Secteur réservé
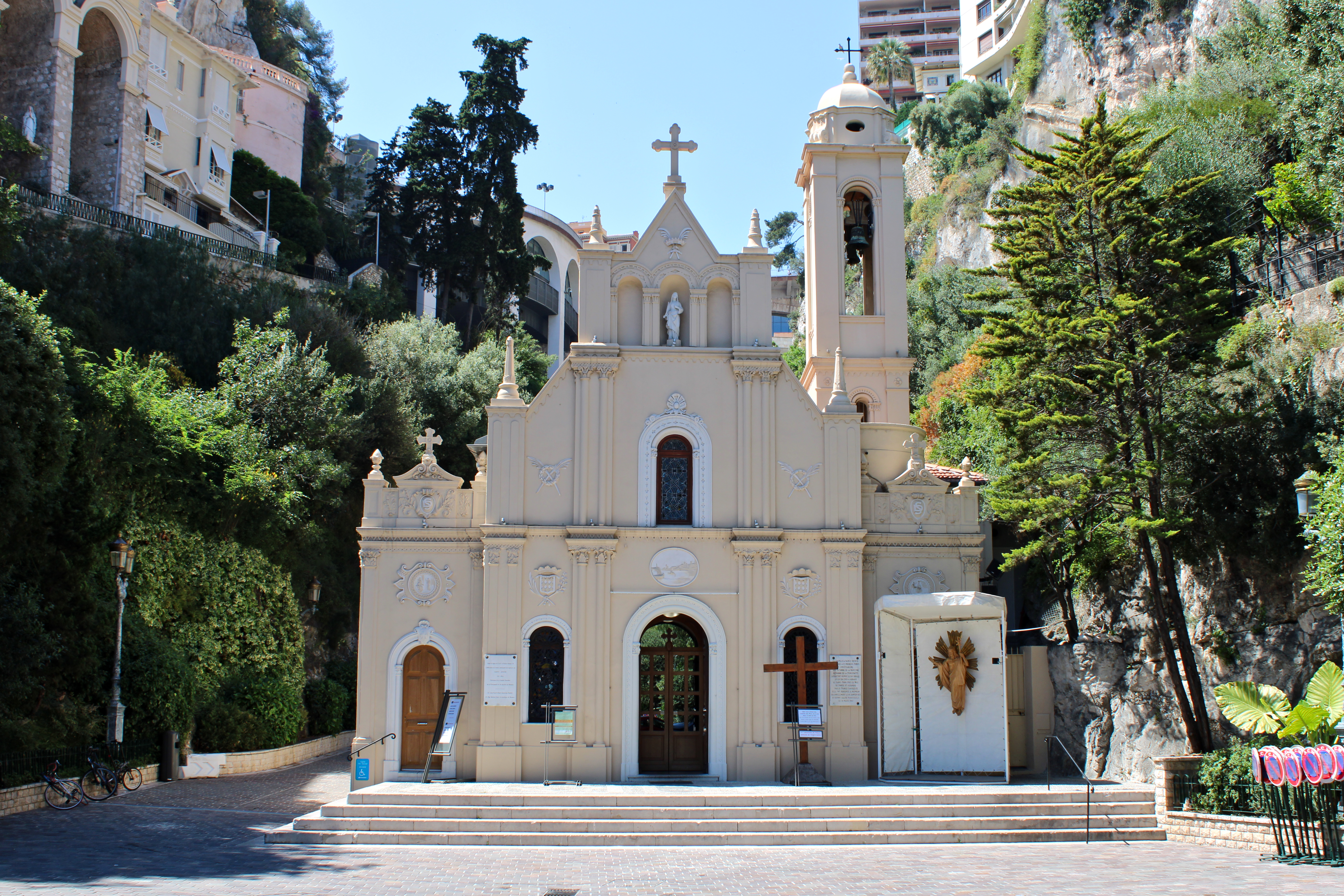
- Sainte-Dévote Chapel

- Location in Monaco
- Coordinates: 43°44′15″N 7°25′15″E
- Country: Monaco

Area
  - Land: 0.023485 km^{2} (0.009068 sq mi)

Ravin de Sainte-Dévote (French pronunciation: [ʁavɛ̃ də sɛ̃t devɔt]; Monégasque: Valu̍n de Santa Devota, English: Ravine of Saint Devota) is a ward in the Principality of Monaco. It is the smallest first level administrative division in the world.

== Characteristics ==
The ravine of Sainte-Dévote lies in the valley of the river Gaumattes. Since 2013, the area of the ward has become (together with Monaco-Ville) a reserved sector, "whose current character must be preserved". With a size of 2.35 hectares (6 acres) it is the smallest ward of the country. It runs roughly along a stretch of territory oriented northwest to southeast, with a length of about 300 metres and a maximum width of 100 metres. At Monaco station (northwest) it borders France, and at the boulevard Albert 1st (south) it comes within around 40 metres of Port Hercules. The ward borders Moneghetti in the southwest, La Condamine in the south and southeast, Monte-Carlo in the northeast, and the French commune of Beausoleil in the northwest.

The bottom of the ravine is situated several dozens metres below the neighbouring wards. With the exception of the Sainte-Dévote Chapel, from which the ward got its name, there are few buildings; it is however dominated by buildings on both sides. Several bridges cross the area - the Saint-Dévote bridge gives access to the train station, in the southeast the bridge carrying the boulevard du Larvotto crosses the area almost above the Sainte-Dévote Chapel.

For the purpose of the population statistics in the 2016 census, the Ravin de Sainte-Dévote ward was integrated into the quarter of Les Moneghetti.

== See also ==
- Municipality of Monaco
- Geography of Monaco
- Administrative divisions of Monaco
