= Dominique-Marie David =

French prelate (born 1963)

Dominique-Marie David Comm. l'Emm.
- Archbishop of Monaco
- Church: Catholic Church
- Archdiocese: Archdiocese of Monaco
- Appointed: 21 January 2020
- Predecessor: Bernard Barsi

Orders
- Ordination: 29 June 1991 by Émile Marcus
- Consecration: 8 March 2020 by Bernard Barsi

Personal details
- Born: Dominique-Marie Jean Michel David; 21 September 1963 (age 62) Beaupréau, Maine-et-Loire, France
- Coat of arms

Dominique-Marie Jean Michel David (French pronunciation: [dɔminik maʁi david]; born 21 September 1963) is a French prelate of the Catholic Church who has been the Archbishop of Monaco since 2021. He is a member of the Emmanuel Community.

== Biography ==
David was born on 21 September 1963 in Beaupréau in Maine-et-Loire. After high school, he attended the Université catholique de l'Ouest in Angers, graduating with a degree in English philology. He worked as an English teacher. He entered the Emmanuel Community and was sent as a seminarian to the Saint-Paul Interdiocesan Seminary in Louvain-la-Neuve, Belgium, where he earned a bachelor's degree in theology from the Université catholique de Louvain. He was ordained a priest for the diocese of Nantes on 29 June 1991.

Throughout his career he has combined parish assignments in his diocese with responsibilities within the Emmanuel Community. He was vicar of the parish of Sautron in the Diocese of Nantes from 1991 to 1995; led the liturgical service of the Emmanuel Community from 1995 to 2001; was responsible for the formation of seminarians at the Community's Maison Saint-Martin in Paris from 1997 to 2001; was administrator of the Saint-Diversien parish in Nantes in 2001-2002; was parish priest of the Sainte-Madeleine parish there from 2002 to 2009; headed the ordained ministers and seminarians of the Community from 2009 to 2016; was Rector of the Trinità dei Monti church in Rome from 2016 to 2019; (Note: On 25 July 2016, the Holy See and France signed an amendment to their 1828 pact governing the church of Trinità dei Monti, placing in the care of the Emmanuel Community as of 1 September.) and a member of the team of formators of the Saint-Jean Interdiocesan Seminary in Nantes beginning in 2019.

Pope Francis appointed him Archbishop of Monaco on 21 January 2020. He visited Monaco for the first time later that month; the Emmanuel Community has no presence there. As his episcopal motto he chose "We know and rely on the love God has for us" (1 John 4:16). He received his episcopal consecration on 8 March 2020 from his predecessor in Monaco, Bernard Barsi. The co-consecrators were Archbishop Jean-Paul James of Bordeaux, formerly Bishop of Nantes, and Bishop Yves Le Saux of Le Mans, a member of the Emmanuel Community.

David is the Grand Prior of the Monaco Lieutenancy of the Equestrian Order of the Holy Sepulchre of Jerusalem.

== Notes ==
Catholic Church titles
Preceded by Bernard Barsi	Archbishop of Monaco	Incumbent
