= Devota =

Patron saint of Corsica

Saint Devota
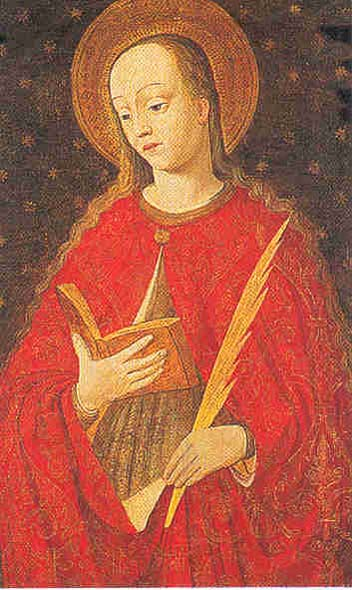
- Born: Mariana, Corsica
- Died: c. 303; Mariana, Corsica
- Venerated in: Roman Catholic Church, Orthodox Church
- Feast: January 27
- Attributes: palm, crown of roses, dove, boat, coat-of-arms of the Principality of Monaco; dead maiden in a boat on the sea with a dove flying ahead of it
- Patronage: Corsica; Monaco; House of Grimaldi; Mariana, Corsica; mariners

Devota (French: Sainte Dévote; Corsican: Santa Divota; died ca. 303 AD) is the patroness saint of Corsica and Monaco. She was killed during the persecutions of the Roman Emperors Diocletian and Maximian. She is sometimes identified with another Corsican saint named Julia, who was described in Latin as Deo devota ("devoted to God"). The description was misinterpreted as a proper name. The legend connected with her is similar to those told of other saints of the region, such as Reparata and Torpes of Pisa.

== Legend ==
Tradition holds that she was a Corsican woman born around 283 AD at Mariana in northeastern Corsica. A young virgin, she had decided to devote herself fully to the service of God. Devota was part of the household of senator Eutychius. During the Diocletian persecution, the prefect Barbarus arrived in Corsica with a fleet and when he learned that the senator was harboring a Christian in his house, demanded that she be given up and compelled to perform the requisite sacrifice to the imperial cult. Eutychius refused, and not wishing to confront him directly, Barbarus arranged to have him poisoned. Devota was imprisoned and tortured for her faith. She was martyred at Mariana by being racked or stoned to death.

After her death, the governor of the province ordered for her body to be burnt to prevent its veneration. However, it was saved from the flames by Christians. Her body was placed on a boat bound for Africa. Gratianus, the boat's pilot; Benedict, a priest; and Apollinaris, his deacon; believed it would receive proper Christian burial there. However, a storm overtook the boat. A dove appeared and guided the boat to present-day Les Gaumates, today part of the Principality of Monaco, where a chapel dedicated to Saint George stood. In her honor a chapel was built. Traditionally, flowers are said to bloom before their season on January 27, the saint's feast day.

== Sainte-Dévote Chapel ==
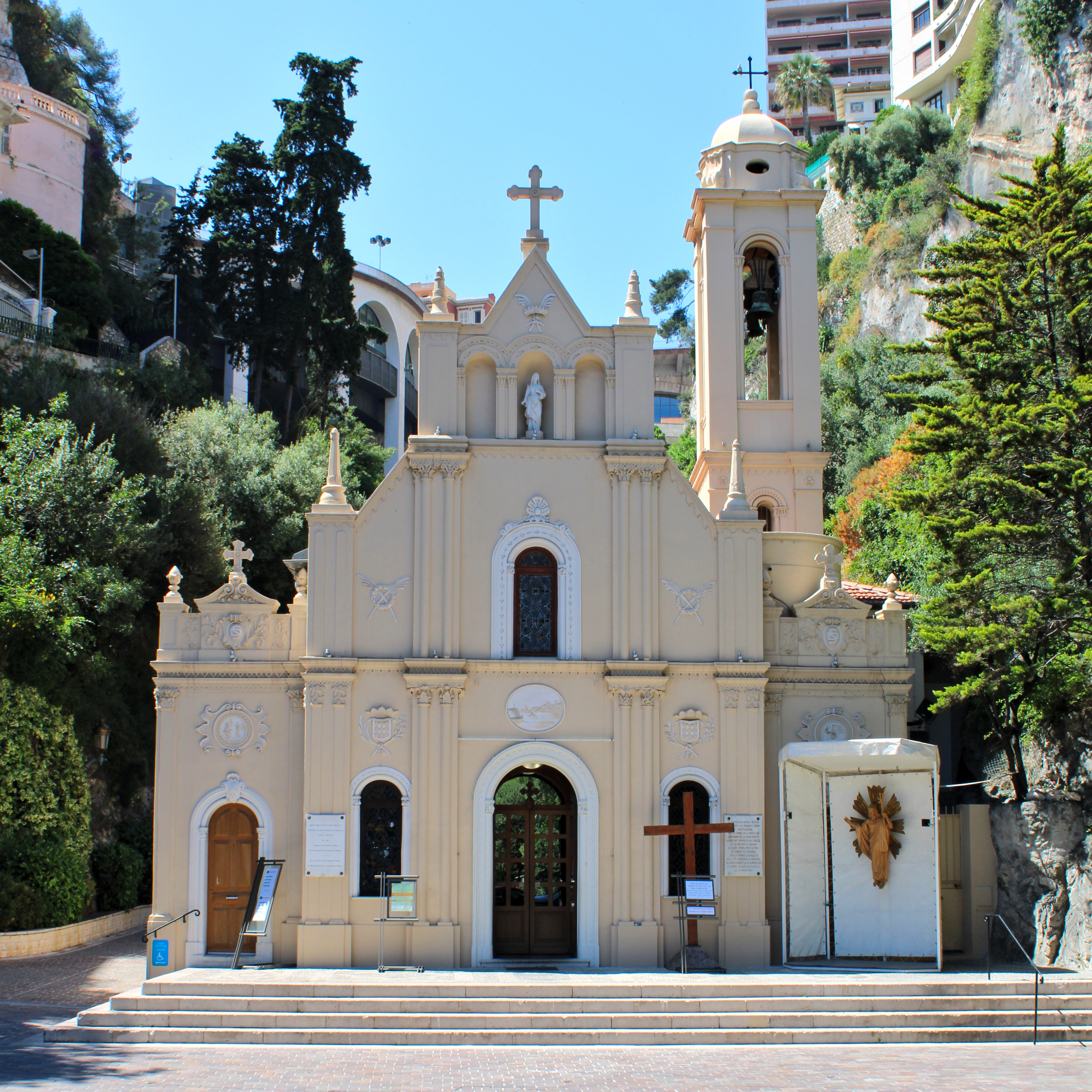
Sainte-Dévote Chapel in Monaco

The Sainte-Dévote Chapel is first mentioned about 1070, belonging to the abbey of Saint Pons. The chapel was rebuilt and expanded several times. It became a priory in the 13th century and in 1536 was acquired by Honoré I, Lord of Monaco. The chapel became the parish church in 1887.

== Veneration in Monaco ==
The "Legend of Saint Devota" is one of the Principality of Monaco's oldest traditions – it has influenced national culture in fields as diverse as religion, folklore and popular beliefs, history, literature, the arts, painting, music, coins and stamps. This legend, passed on through a medieval document, holds a special place in the heart of Monaco's people and over the centuries has been awarded a permanent place in the city's history. Reports of miracles soon sprung in connection with the tomb. During incursions by Moors, Devota's relics were translated to safety at the monastery of Cimiez. They were returned to Monaco, to a church restored much later by Antonio I, prince of Monaco.

In 1070, Antinope, the captain of a Florentine ship, attempted to steal the reliquary containing Devota's relics. The legend states that a violent wind impeded him from escaping with the relics. Arrested, Ugo Grimaldi ordered his ears and nose to be cut off. Antinope's boat was then burnt on the beach of Monaco.

In the 16th century, Devota was invoked for protection against the Genoese and the Pisans. Their ultimate failure to take away the independence of Monaco was attributed to the divine protection of Devota. An end to the outbreak of the plague in 1631 was attributed to Devota, as well as the expulsion of the Spanish on the night of 17 November 1641 a galley taken from the Spanish was rebaptized "Devota." Monégasque coins bearing the effigy of Devota were issued in the 16th century, beginning in the reign of Honoré II, Prince of Monaco. During his reign, Devota became the patroness of Monaco.

A series of postage stamps bearing Devota's likeness were issued in 1944 as well as 1992.

However, as the Sainte-Dévote Chapel lends its name to the first corner of the Circuit de Monaco, one source has commented that "Saint Devota's name is unfortunately heard on the radio waves solely for the Monaco's Grand Prix Formula 1 for the famous bend of Saint Devota."

Joseph Méry put the legend of Saint Devota into verse. The first book written in Monegasque language by the Monegasque poet, Louis Notari, is entitled A legenda de Santa Devota (The Legend of Saint Devota). It was composed in 1927 and is important because until then the Monégasque language, had been utilized for speech.

=== Feast day ===
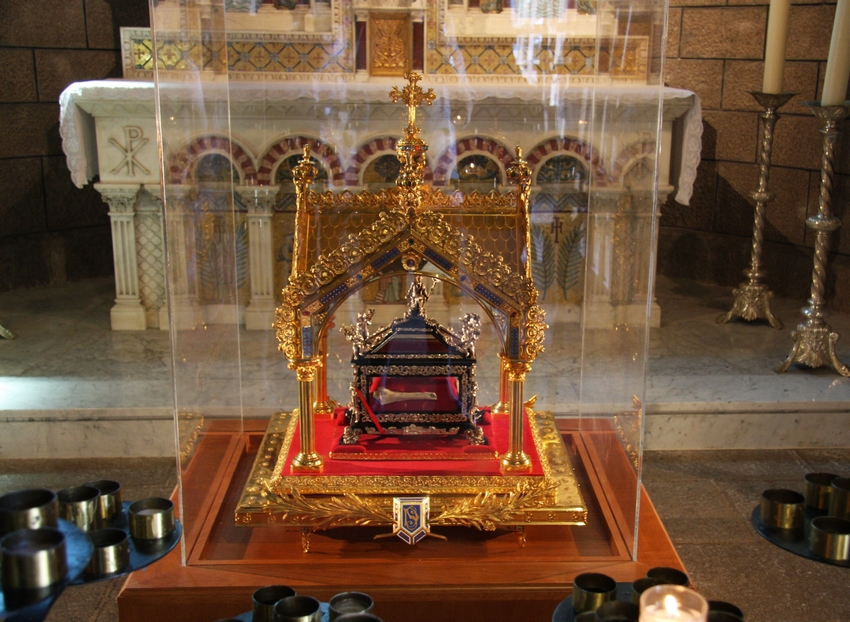
Relics of Saint Devota

Devota's cult became important to Monaco and the Grimaldis. Since 1874 it has been the custom that on the evening before her feast day a symbolic fishing boat is brought in procession into Port-Hercule and set alight outside the Église Sainte Dévote. This is followed by a fireworks display that lights up Port-Hercule.

On January 27, the Mass is celebrated in the Cathedral of Our Lady of the Immaculate Conception attended by Prince Albert II and Princess Charlene. It is followed by a Solemn Procession of the Relics, to request protection for the Royal Family and the Principality. Receptions in the Monte Carlo Opera House also take place.

In 2014 the Monegasque Rugby Federation, in association with the Princess Charlene of Monaco Foundation, organized the Saint Devota Rugby Challenge. Including teams from Spain and Italy, the free program includes educational workshops and circuits for disabled children, to introduce them to the game.

== Diffusion of cult in Corsica ==
In the 1687, some of Devota's relics were transported from Monaco to the Jesuit church of Sant'Ignazio on the island. Between 1727 and 1751, attempts were made to receive from the Holy See official recognition of Devota as patron saint of Corsica. These were refused because there was scant evidence of her existence. However, the diffusion of her cult continued and Pasquale Paoli created a short-lived Order of Saint Devota in 1757 during the movement for Corsican independence.

In 1820, the first bishop of the diocese of Corsica proclaimed both Saint Devota and Saint Julia to be the principal patron saints of Corsica. In 1893, a church was dedicated to Saint Devota on the island. Her cult was approved in 1984 by the bishop of Ajaccio. The new Roman Martyrology commemorates her on January 27, with the description, "At Mariana, on the island of Corsica, in memory of Saint Devota, virgin and martyr."

== Legacy ==
Saint Devota was recently selected as the main motif of a high value collector's coin; the €5 silver 1700th anniversary of Saint Devota's death commemorative coin, minted in 2004. On the reverse of the coin, a statue of the saint can be seen. Next to it is a representation of the dove guiding the boat to the coast of Monaco, as recorded in the legend.

== Sources ==
- Prince's Palace of Monaco
- Baring-Gould, Sabine. The Lives of the Saints, J. Hodges., 1877
