= Edmond Abelé =

French Catholic bishop

Orders
- Ordination: 1951

Personal details
- Born: March 4, 1925
- Died: September 27, 2017 (aged 92)
- Denomination: Roman Catholic
- Coat of arms

Edmond-Marie-Henri Abelé (4 March 1925 – 27 September 2017) was a Catholic bishop.

Ordained to the priesthood in 1951, Abelé served as bishop of the Diocese of Monaco from 1972 to 1980. He then served as bishop of the Diocese of Digne from 1980 to 1987. Abelé died on 27 September 2017, aged 92.
