= Lycée Albert Premier =

School in Monaco

Coordinates: 43.7313°N 7.4252°E

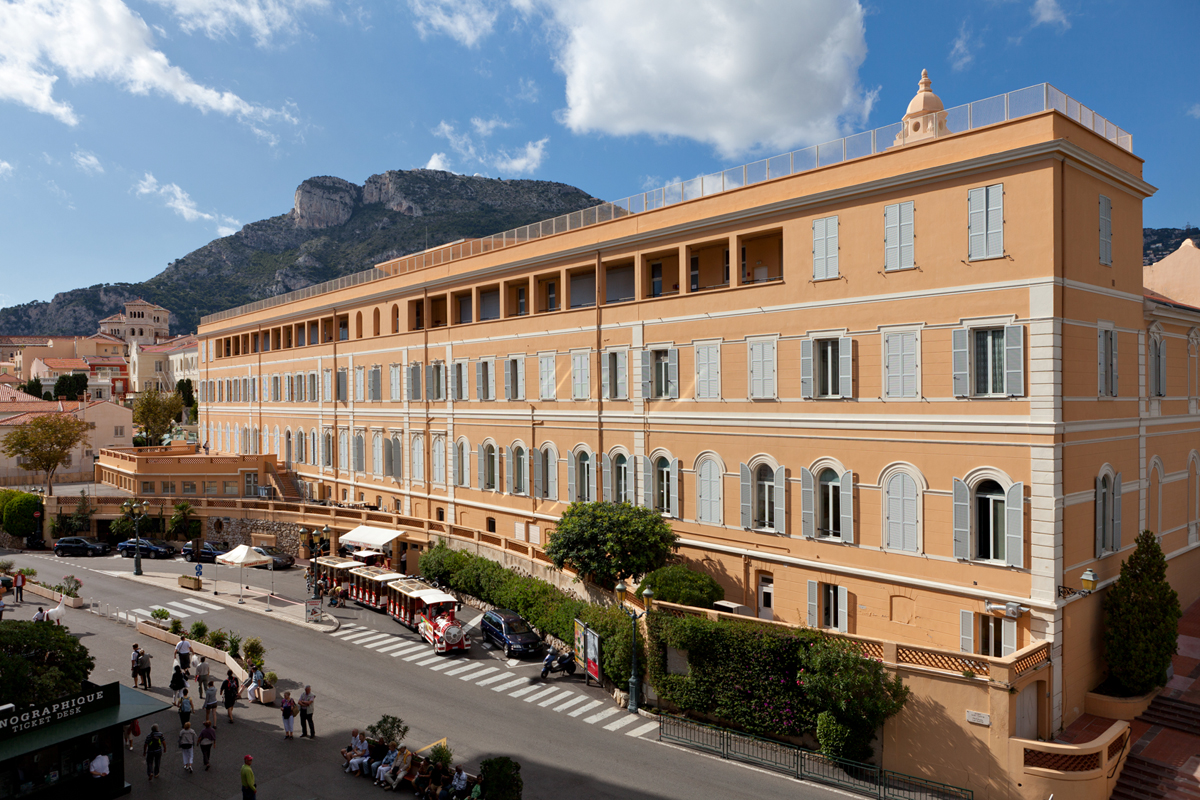
Lycée Albert Premier of Monaco

The Lycée Albert Premier (Monegasque: Liçe̍ Albertu I^{mu}) of Monaco (or the Albert 1st of Monaco High School) is a public secondary school founded in 1910 in the Principality of Monaco. The school offers courses according to the curriculum prescribed by the French Directorate of National Education, Youth and Sports. It is located in Monaco-Ville on the Rock, site of the Visitation.

== The 17th to 20th century ==
The main building was constructed between 1665 and 1675 as a convent for noble girls, as requested by the Catherine-Charlotte de Gramont, wife of Louis I. Today, the monastery still shows vaulting from this period.

During the French Revolution, the convent was transformed into barracks for Sardinian troops. They occupied the buildings until 18 July 1860 when the King of Sardina's rule over the Principality ended.

For the next 10 years, the buildings were vacant, until, on 31 May 1870, a group of Italian Jesuits began to use them to provide open college courses. This lasted until 1910.

== The school of Monaco from 1910 to 1960 ==
In Monaco, many religious schools were created after 1860, including the Ladies of Saint-Maur, a primary school that is still in use today, and the Christian Brothers College.

Seeking a secular alternative to these religious schools, Albert I, an eminent scientist, founded the "School of Monaco" in September, 1910. He also founded the Oceanographic Museum of Monaco that faces the high school in the same year.

The school was originally only for boys, and followed the French model. The first candidates for BA (French) graduated in 1913. However, in 1918, the school expanded to include girls.

== After 1960 ==
On the 50th anniversary of its founding, Rainier III renamed the school "Lycée Albert I st" to commemorate its founder. He also had a plaque placed at the schools entrance, detailing the school buildings’ various transformations. The High School Albert 1st continues to deliver courses to this day, having celebrated its centenary in 2010. Currently, one hundred faculty offer courses to 751 students. In 2022, success rate at baccalauréat was 98%.

== Library Prince Albert II ==
The library was inaugurated by Grace Kelly. The library preserves many ancient works from private donations including a copy of the Encyclopedia of Diderot and d'Alembert. Originally named the Prince Albert Library, the name was changed to the Prince Albert II Library during the centenary celebrations in 2010 to honor Albert II.

== Famous alumni ==
- Léo Ferré (1916–1993)
- Claude Francois (1939–1978)
- Dominique Strauss-Kahn (b. 1949), formerly chairman of the International Monetary Fund
- Albert II, Prince of Monaco (b. 1958) (class of 1977)
- Stéphane Valeri (b. 1962)
- Jean-François Robillon (b. 1962)
- Louis Ducruet (b. 1992) (class of 2010)
- Pauline Ducruet (b. 1994) (class of 2011)
- Charles Leclerc (b. 1997) (class of 2015)

== See also ==
- List of Jesuit sites
