= Constitution of Monaco =

Fundamental law of Monaco

The Constitution of Monaco, first adopted in 1911 after the Monégasque Revolution and heavily revised by Prince Rainier III on 17 December 1962, outlines three branches of government, including several administrative offices and a number of councils, who share advisory and legislative power with the prince.

The constitution also defines the line of succession to the Monegasque throne; this section was modified on 2 April 2002.

By word count, it is the shortest constitution in the world currently in force, totaling approximately 3,800 words.

== Executive branch ==
The prince retains the highest executive power, but the principality's head of government is the minister of state, who presides over a six-member Council of Government, helps advise the prince, and is responsible for enforcing the laws.

The principality's local affairs (i.e., the administration of the four quarters of Monaco-Ville, La Condamine, Monte Carlo, and Fontvieille) are directed by the Communal Council, which consists of fifteen elected members and is presided over by the mayor.

== Legislative branch ==
Under the 1962 constitution, the prince shares his power with the unicameral National Council, the Principality's legislative body. Though it is independent of the prince and may act contrary to his wishes, his signature is required to confirm any of its proposed laws.

== Judicial branch ==
Judicial power is invested in the prince, who delegates judicial procedures to the various courts, which dispense justice in his name. The independence of the judges is guaranteed by the constitution. The Supreme Court of Monaco is composed of five chief members and two assistant judges named by the prince on the basis of nominations by the National Council and other government bodies. The Supreme Court is the highest court for judicial appeals and also interprets the constitution when necessary. Monaco's legal system, closely related to that of France, is patterned after the Napoleonic Code.
