= Skema Business School =

French business school

Coordinates: 48.8618°N 2.2250°E

SKEMA Business School
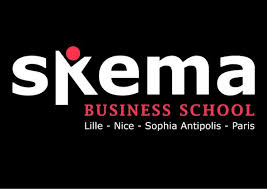
- Former names: ESC Lille (est.1892) & CERAM Business School (est.1963)
- Motto: At Home Worldwide
- Type: Grande école de commerce et de management (Private research university Business school)
- Established: 2009; 17 years ago
- Accreditation: EQUIS & AACSB
- Academic affiliations: Conférence des Grandes écoles
- Dean: Alice Guilhon
- Academic staff: 180; 95% PhD.; 37% female; 62% international
- Students: 9,500; 120 nationalities
- Location: France: Lille, Paris, Nice / Sophia Antipolis; USA: Raleigh; China: Suzhou; Brazil: Belo Horizonte; South Africa: Cape Town; United Arab Emirates: Dubai
- Language: English-only & French-only instruction
- Colors: Red; Black
- Website: www.skema.edu

SKEMA Business School ("School of Knowledge Economy and Management") is a French business school ("Grande École") with campuses across Europe, the Americas, Asia, and Africa. It was established in 2009 through the merger of Ecole Supérieure de Commerce de Lille (ESC Lille) and CERAM Business School in Sophia Antipolis.

The school holds international accreditations from EQUIS and AACSB, and its Executive MBA is accredited by the EFMD (EFMD Accredited EMBA). SKEMA was ranked 26th in the 2024 Financial Times European Business Schools ranking and is listed among the top business schools in the QS Business Masters Rankings.

Among its postgraduate offerings, the Master in Financial Markets & Investments (FMI) is oriented toward careers in investment banking, asset management, and risk analysis. In the 2024 Financial Times Masters in Finance Pre-experience ranking, the program was ranked 3rd worldwide.

== History ==
The merger was announced on 30 June 2009, and they now form a single non-profit organization confirmed by their respective governing bodies (the General Assembly of the French Riviera Chamber of Commerce and the Board of Directors of ESC Lille). In spite of some criticism due to the heterogeneity level regarding student selection, the official ceremony and announcement of the new name took place on 16 November 2009. CERAM Business School and ESC Lille were respectively founded in 1963 by the French Riviera Chamber of Commerce and in 1892 by Lille Chamber of Commerce. The new school name, SKEMA, is derived from the Greek, skhêma (shape, figure, formation of an object) meaning schema in Latin. It also stands for the initial letters of "School of Knowledge Economy and Management".

The consolidated middle schools is now one of the largest French business schools in the number of students (8,500), seventh in number of teachers (166) and sixth in terms of budget.

Since its beginnings in 2009 as a result of the merger between ESC Lille and CERAM Business School, SKEMA has been a global business school with the same ambition for its French and international campuses: to train mobile and adaptable leaders and managers, able to contribute to the knowledge economy and generate sustainable performance with an appreciation for the values and challenges of society, the environment and the economy.

== Grande école degrees ==
SKEMA Business School is a grande école, a French institution of higher education that is separate from, but parallel and often connected to, the main framework of the French public university system. Grandes écoles are elite academic institutions that admit students through an extremely competitive process, and a significant proportion of their graduates occupy the highest levels of French society. Similar to Ivy League schools in the United States, Oxbridge in the UK, and C9 League in China, graduation from a grande école is considered the prerequisite credential for any top government, administrative and corporate position in France.

The degrees are accredited by the Conférence des Grandes Écoles and awarded by the Ministry of National Education (France). Higher education business degrees in France are organized into three levels thus facilitating international mobility: the Licence / Bachelor's degrees, and the Master's and Doctorat degrees. The Bachelors and the Masters are organized in semesters: 6 for the Bachelors and 4 for the Masters. Those levels of study include various "parcours" or paths based on UE (Unités d'enseignement or Modules), each worth a defined number of European credits (ECTS). A student accumulates those credits, which are generally transferable between paths. A Bachelors is awarded once 180 ECTS have been obtained (bac + 3); a Masters is awarded once 120 additional credits have been obtained (bac +5). The highly coveted PGE (Grand Ecole Program) ends with the degree of Master's in Management (MiM).

== Campuses ==
SKEMA has opened several international campuses. It has three campuses in France in Lille, Paris and Sophia Antipolis near Nice, and campuses in China (Suzhou), Brazil (Belo Horizonte) and the USA (Raleigh, North Carolina, in partnership with North Carolina State University) and Dubai in the United Arab Emirates. Lille and Sophia Antipolis campuses are the historic locations of the ESC Lille and CERAM Business School.

In May 2019 the school announced the upcoming opening of its new Grand Paris campus in Suresnes. Previously occupied by Airbus, it spreads across 30,000 m^{2} (320,000 sq ft) comprising 40 classrooms and two large lecture halls. This campus will also have a rooftop of 1,600m^{2}, a co-working space and a student residence. It has opened in January 2021.

SKEMA announced the opening of a new campus in Cape Town (South Africa) at the beginning of academic year 2019/2020.

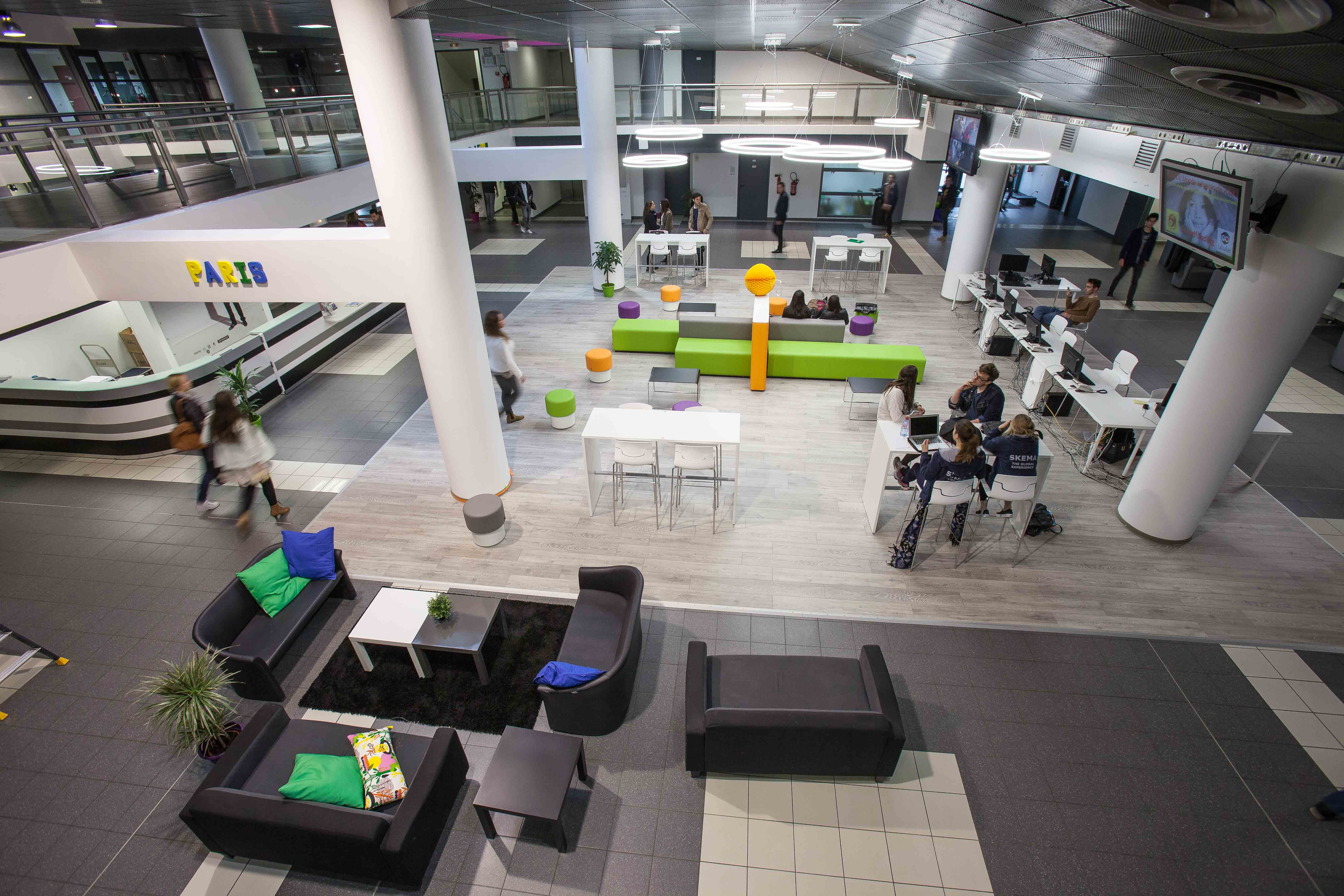
SKEMA - Lille Campus (France)

The Lille campus is located in the Euralille business district in the north of France. The Lille campus gathers more than 2,200 students over 16,000 m2. A partnership has been established with the University of Lille to develop joint-programmes and combine the institutions' research efforts in the Lille School of Management Research Center.

The Sophia Antipolis campus is located in the technology park of the same name in the south of France. A partnership with Sciences Po Aix offers joint-programmes, enabling business students to study political sciences.

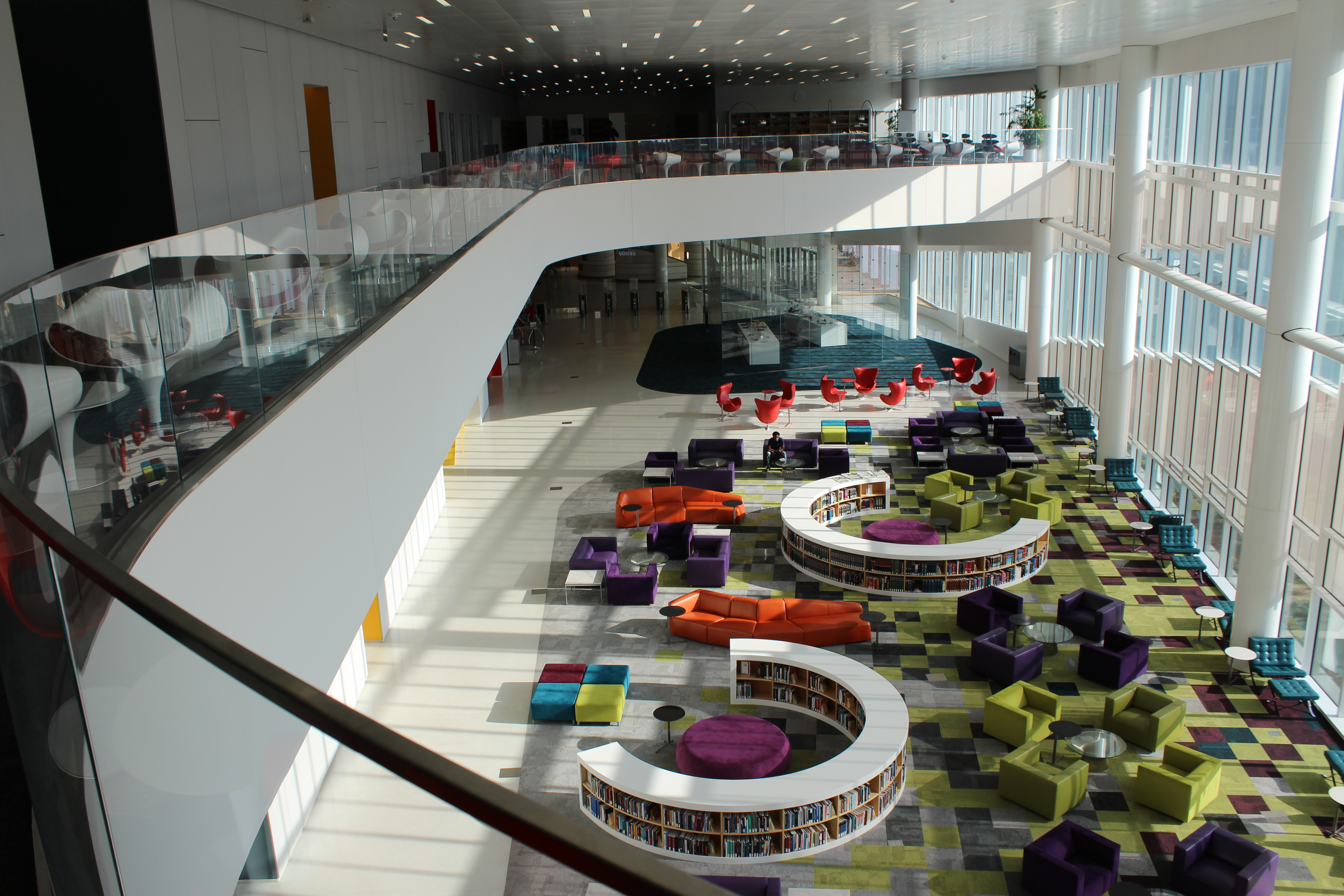
SKEMA - Centennial Campus of North Carolina State University (USA)

== Rankings ==
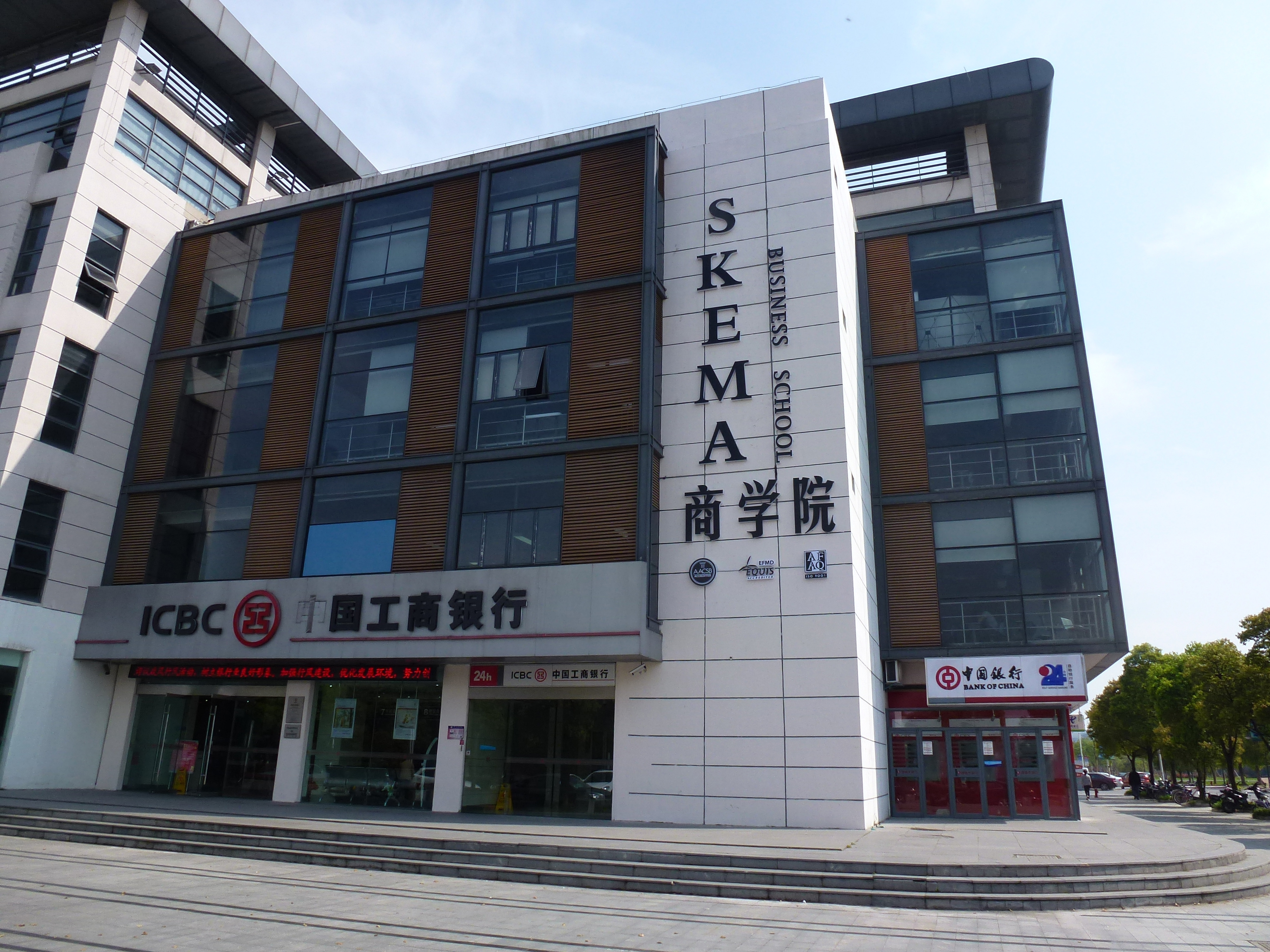
SKEMA - Suzhou Campus (China)

Financial Times rankings：

According to Financial Times, SKEMA ranked 18th worldwide in the 2025 Masters in Management ranking and 2^{nd} worldwide in the 2025 Masters in Finance (pre-experience) ranking. In the 2025 European Business School ranking, the school placed 16th in Europe.

The Economist ranking：

2021. MSc International Business ranked 5th worldwide.

Forbes ranking：

2019, MBA ranked among the 12 best Executive MBA programmes.

2020, MSc Entrepreneurship & Innovation ranked among the 10 best entrepreneurial programmes.

SKEMA is double-accredited – Equis EFMD Accredited EMBA and AACSB. Its programmes are recognised in France (Visa, Master's degree, RNCP, CGE label), as well as in the USA (licensing), Brazil (certificação) and China.

== Research ==
SKEMA has several research centers and a unit for entrepreneurship and innovation.

- FAIRR (Finance and Accounting Insights on Risk and Regulation)
- KTO (Knowledge, Technology and Organization)
- MINT (Marketing Interactions)
- PRISM (PRoject Information and Supply Management)
- RISE² (Reflections and Research In International Strategy Sustainability Entrepreneurship and Economics)
- ThinkForward - a regular podcast that covers business topics.
- SKEMA Ventures - a business unit dedicated to entrepreneurship and innovation. Through teaching, coaching, incubation and acceleration, this unit helps SKEMA students and alumni think, design, test and launch an entrepreneurial business/project in a global context. Faculty facilitate and stimulate the generation of ideas and assists entrepreneurs in the construction, launching, and development of their business/project. Entrepreneurs also apply their knowledge at events such as the StarTonic Weekend, Bootstrap, Bootcamp, Booster and Startup Kafés.
- PEPITEs & Incubators - SKEMA partners with French universities to offer PEPITEs (student centers for innovation transfer and entrepreneurship) and grants student-entrepreneur awards: PEPITE PACA-EST Cre@tude; Incubateur PACA-EST (IPE); PEPITE Lille Nord de France; Le Village By CA; and, the incubator Tonic in Lille. In Belo Horizonte, SKEMA has a SEED (Startups and Entrepreneurship Ecosystem Development) accelerator, in China it works with the Crescenders incubator, and in the United States, SKEMA participates in an entrepreneurial clinic / bootcamp co-organized with the North Carolina State.

== Programmes ==
=== Undergraduate Programmes ===
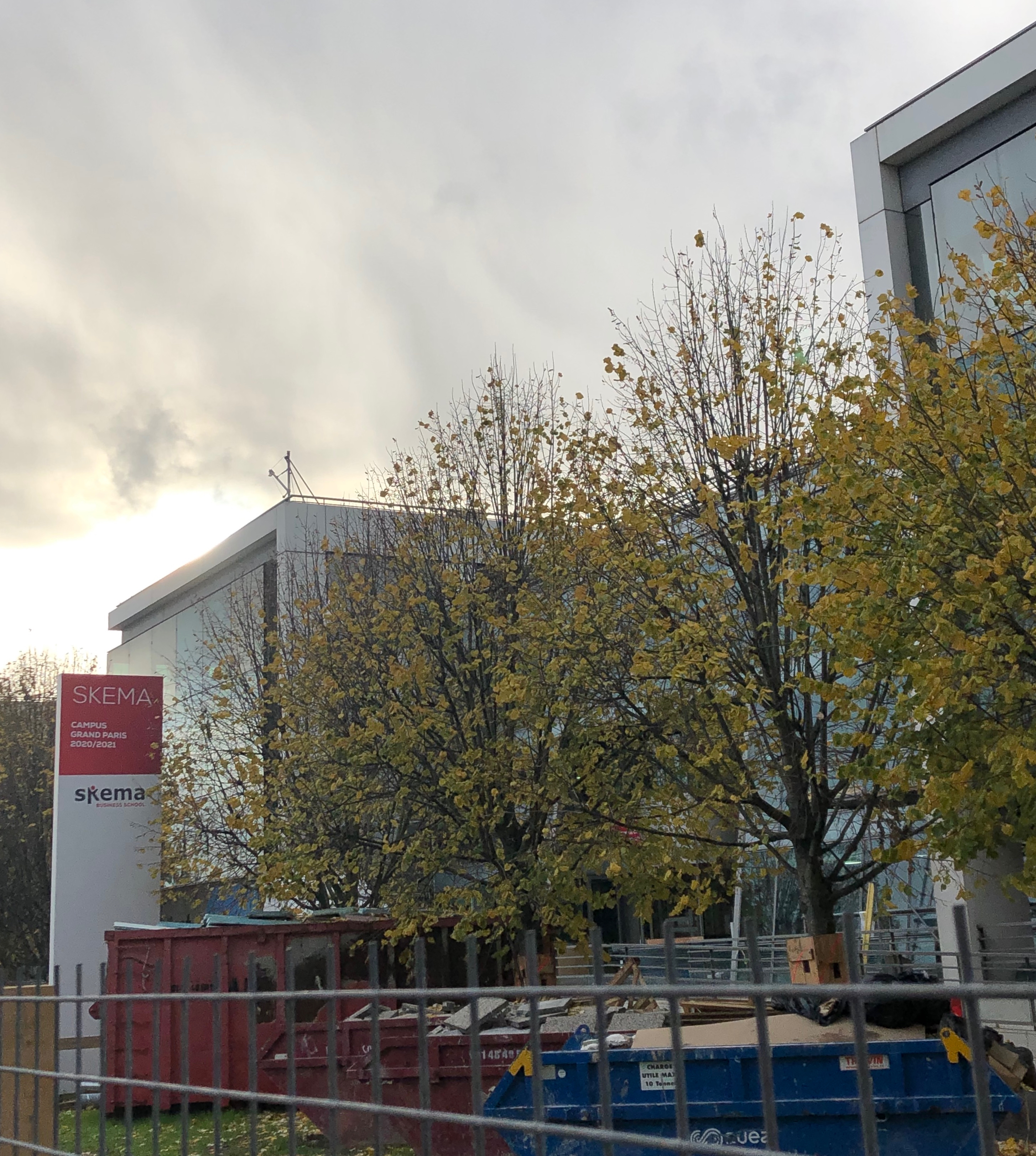
SKEMA - Paris Suresnes Campus

SKEMA offers two undergraduate programmes: Bachelor of Business Administration (BBA) in Global Management and Bachelor of Business Administration (BBA) in International Business.

The BBA in Global Management allows students to obtain a double degree - SKEMA's BBA in Global Management degree and (according to the student's choice):

- North Carolina State University (NCSU) bachelor's degree, or
- A bachelor's degree from a partner university in the case of a double-diploma transfer programme, or
- SKEMA's American bachelor's degree in the case of a one-year stay (or more) at the Raleigh campus

SKEMA's BBA in International Business is a four-year degree program that prepares students to succeed in today's global economy and is available at its Raleigh, USA, campus. SKEMA's Raleigh campus gives students the choice to study abroad for one or two years at an international campus. Students have the possibility to return to the US for their fourth year and do their capstone project, or to continue their fourth year abroad to get a double degree or another specialisation.

=== MSc Programmes ===
SKEMA's Master of Science (MSc) programmes are mostly taught over a one-year period and are entirely in English. The one-year MSc programmes are for applicants who have a four-year degree, while the two-year MSc programmes are for those with a three-year university degree. SKEMA Business School offers 18 masters of science programmes covering all major business domains.

They are mainly divided into the following categories: Finance, Marketing, Management, and Business and Strategy. Recently developed programmes include Digital Business and Digital Marketing and a double diploma partnership with UC Berkeley for Entrepreneurship students.

=== Master in Management/Grande Ecole Programme ===
SKEMA's Master in Management is a two-year multi-campus programme offering a wide range of specialisations and a variety of learning paths. Students can choose to study either in French or English and get the change to study abroad at one of SKEMA's international campuses in China, Brazil and the US, besides France.

Other features include:

- Between 12 and 24 months’ experience in a company
- Innovative teaching and learning: six interdisciplinary teaching and learning projects and targeted, appropriate use of e-learning and m-learning teaching methods
- Specific focus on management in the knowledge economy

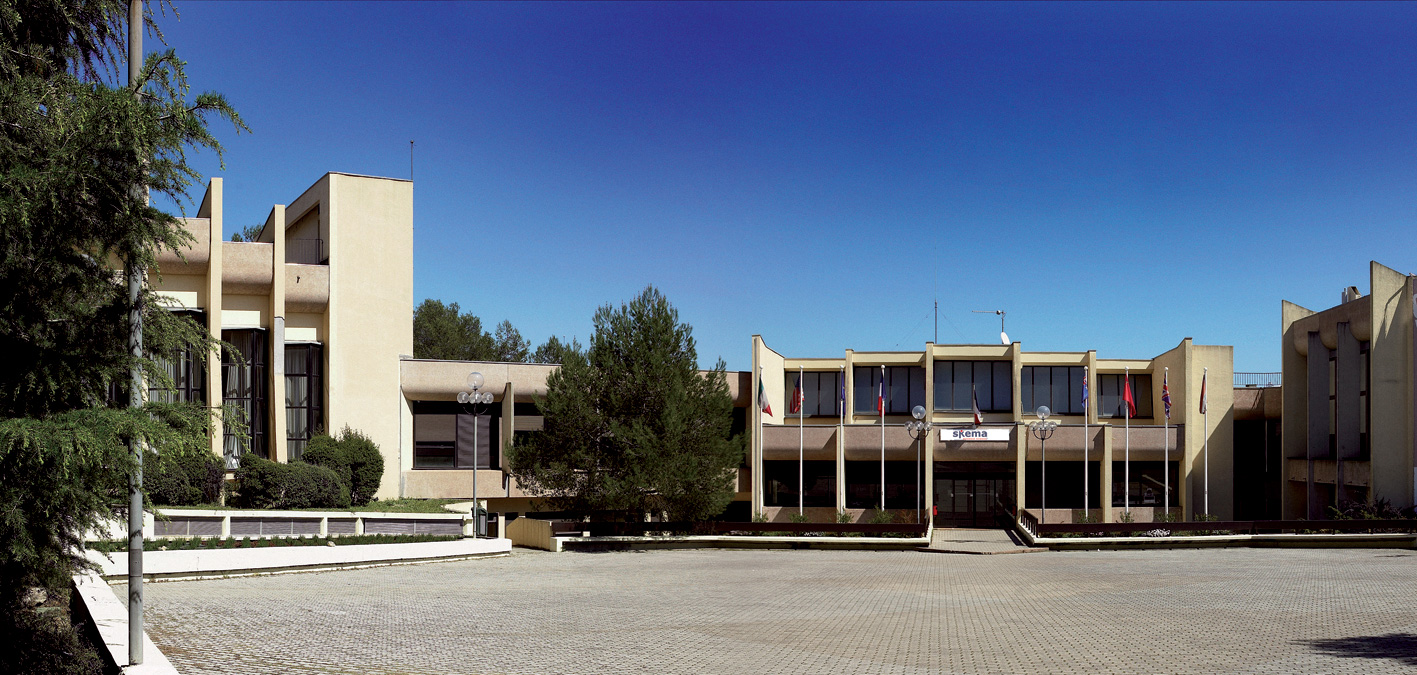
SKEMA - Sophia Antipolis Nice Campus

=== PhD, Doctoral equivalences ===
SKEMA offers the equivalent doctoral programmes: PhD in Finance and Accounting, KTO PhD In Management, Doctorate of Business Administration (DBA) in Project and Programme Management and Digital DBA.

=== Executive MBA Programme ===
SKEMA Business School's Global Executive Master in Business Administration (GEMBA) is for experienced executives wishing to increase their managerial and strategic skills in an international environment. The Global EMBA allows participants to develop a global and innovative strategic vision in today's complex, unpredictable and interconnected world. This programme is a real springboard to help executives achieve strategic missions inside their company, reorient their career path or launch their own business.

The programme delivers twelve core modules offering a general understanding of the key business functions of companies and general managerial skills as well as two optional specialisations: Project Management and Entrepreneurship & Innovation.

== Summer Schools ==
SKEMA offers two short programmes in Paris during the summer:The programmes are Finance and Banking and Project Management.

== Student unions ==
65 student societies are present at the school in the fields of art, culture, business, environment, humanitarian and social aid, high tech, sport, student life, and international.

Interculture SKEMA and S'Konnection are the 2 main student unions in charge of welcoming international students from all across the world. They represent the open-minded spirit of the school.

Skema Conseil is a Junior Entreprise, student consultancy society, providing services to entrepreneurs and firms. The society is present on Sophia Antipolis (French Riviera), Paris and Lille. SKEMA Conseil was elected "Best Junior Entreprise of 2012"

AIESEC, autonomous organization, with headquarters located at Montreal, has several local offices in the Lille and Sophia-Antipolis campuses for Skema students.

== Notable alumni ==
- Prince Joel Dawit Makonnen, Ethiopian prince
- Louis Ducruet (1992), son of Princess Stéphanie of Monaco, singer and Daniel Ducruet, driver for hire and Nephew of Albert II, Prince of Monaco
- Yannick Agnel, former French swimmer and Olympic medalist
- Jean-Philippe Courtois, Ceram, ex-vice president and president, Microsoft Global Sales, Marketing and Operations.
- Sujit Kumar, Director, CLSA India
- Loïc Bruni, professional downhill mountain biker
- Jimmy Adjovi-Boco former international soccer player and member of Presidential Council for Africa
- Kjerstin Braathen, CEO of DNB
- Jean-Claude Blanc, Ceram, MBA Harvard, ex-General manager and marketing executive of Paris Saint-Germain F.C. and former CEO of Juventus Football Club
- Michaël Youn, Ceram, French Comedian
- Michal Izdinsky, Olympian water polo player
- Leonid Shafirov, Russian financier and public figure
- Samira El Idrissi, world champion of Taekwondo and public figure
- Géraldine Le Meur, entrepreneur and business executive
- Mathilde Thomas, Ceram, co-founder with his husband Bertrand Thomas (ESSEC) of Caudalie, family business and Knight in the Legion of Honour
- Thani Ahmed Al-Zeyoudi, Minister of Climate Change and Environment for the United Arab Emirates
