= Louis Ducruet =

Son of Princess Stéphanie of Monaco

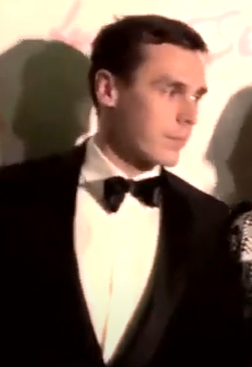
- Ducruet in 2018
- Born: Louis Robert Paul Ducruet; 26 November 1992 (age 33); Princess Grace Hospital Centre, La Colle, Monaco
- Education: Western Carolina University
- Spouse: Marie Hoa Chevallier (m. 2019)
- Children: 2
- Parent(s): Daniel Ducruet; Princess Stéphanie of Monaco
- Relatives: Pauline Ducruet (sister); Camille Gottlieb (maternal half-sister); Linoué Ducruet (paternal half-sister); Michaël Ducruet (paternal half-brother)

Louis Robert Paul Ducruet (French pronunciation: [lwi ʁɔbɛʁ pol dykʁʏ.ɥɛ]born 26 November 1992) is the son of Princess Stéphanie of Monaco and Daniel Ducruet.

== Early life ==
Ducruet grew up in Monaco-Ville. His parents, Princess Stéphanie of Monaco and Daniel Ducruet, were married in 1995, but divorced a year later. For a couple of years, he lived in Auron, France, then he moved with his mother and sisters to the Zurich area. After 2002, he and his mother and sisters returned to live in Monaco.

Ducruet attended primary school in Auron. He then attended the Lycée français Marie Curie de Zurich. He completed secondary schooling at Lycée Albert Premier, where he passed the Baccalauréat in 2010. He started his post-secondary education at Skema Business School in Sophia Antipolis, France. In 2015, he graduated with a bachelor's degree in Sports Management at Western Carolina University, in Cullowhee, North Carolina.

== Career and interests ==
Immediately after secondary school, he took a summer job in the water sports department of Société des bains de mer de Monaco (SBM). He interned for AS Monaco FC and, after obtaining his degree, took a salaried position as an international recruiter. Early in 2019, he was promoted to Assistant to the Vice-President of the club, Vadim Vasilyev.

As of March 2016, Ducruet and his father, Daniel Ducruet, are co-managers of the Monaco-based company MONADECO.

In 2013, Ducruet participated in the "4L Trophy" automobile race. The race covered 6000 km, with starting points from Poitiers to Saint-Jean-de-Luz, and tracked over France, Spain, and Morocco. Ducruet and his co-driver, Ronan Imbrosciano, drove a car that was decorated in the colors and emblem of Radio Monaco. The money raised from the event provides school supplies to poor Moroccan students. In 2022, he was selected for Forbes 30 Under 30 in Monaco.

On 26 October 2020, it was announced that Ducruet joined EFL Championship football club Nottingham Forest as an advisor for international projects.

== Marriage and children ==
On 12 February 2018, Ducruet announced his engagement to long-time girlfriend, Marie Hoa Chevallier (French pronunciation: [maʁi wa ʃəvalje] born 28 December 1992), a Frenchwoman of Vietnamese descent. Ducruet and Chevallier met in their first year of Grande école at the Skema Business School. Chevallier is a graduate of Skema, where she earned her Bachelor of Business Administration, and is specialized in French Education and Marketing from Western Carolina University. She has a career as event coordinator in luxury hospitality.

The civil wedding took place on 26 July 2019 at Monaco town hall. The religious wedding took place on 27 July 2019 at Cathedral of Our Lady Immaculate.

They have a daughter, Victoire Maguy Lam Huong Ducruet, born on 4 April 2023 at 6:15 p.m. in Monaco. Their second daughter, Constance, was born on 2 December 2024.

== Honours ==
- Monaco: Medal for Physical Education and Sports, Third Class (17 November 2025).

Louis Ducruet House of Grimaldi Born: 26 November 1992
Lines of succession
Preceded by Princess Stéphanie	Succession to the Monegasque throne 15th in line	Succeeded by Victoire Ducruet
