= Succession to the Monegasque throne =

Law governing who can become the monarch of Monaco

Throne used by the sovereign of Monaco

The succession to the throne of the Principality of Monaco is currently governed by Princely Law 1.249 of 2 April 2002.

== Eligibility ==
Under the constitution of Monaco, the crown passes according to male-preference cognatic primogeniture. Only persons descended from the reigning monarch and the reigning monarch's siblings and their descendants, whose parents have been married at some point with the monarch's approval, and who are Monegasque citizens are eligible. Children born as a result of adultery are permanently excluded. A dynast forfeits succession rights if he or she marries without the monarch's permission, along with descendants of the unapproved marriage, but can be restored into the line of succession if the marriage produces no issue and ends before the demise of the crown.

Should no one be eligible to succeed according to the succession laws, a council of regency takes power until the Crown Council elects a new monarch from among the more distant descendants of the House of Grimaldi.

== Line of succession ==
The list below includes only persons eligible to succeed to the throne (numbered 1 to 19) and the illegitimate children who would enter the line if their parents ever married.

- Prince Rainier III (1923–2005)
  - Prince Albert II (b. 1958)
    - (1) Hereditary Prince Jacques (b. 2014)
    - (2) Princess Gabriella, Countess of Carladès (b. 2014)
  - (3) Caroline, Princess of Hanover (b. 1957)
    - (4) Andrea Casiraghi (b. 1984)
      - (5) Alexandre (Sasha) Casiraghi (b. 2013)
      - (6) Maximilian Casiraghi (b. 2018)
      - (7) India Casiraghi (b. 2015)
    - (8) Pierre Casiraghi (b. 1987)
      - (9) Stefano Casiraghi (b. 2017)
      - (10) Francesco Casiraghi (b. 2018)
      - (11) Bianca Casiraghi (b. 2025)
    - (12) Charlotte Casiraghi (b. 1986)
      - Raphaël Elmaleh (b. 2013)
      - (13) Balthazar Rassam (b. 2018)
    - (14) Princess Alexandra of Hanover (b. 1999)
  - (15) Princess Stéphanie (b. 1965)
    - (16) Louis Ducruet (b. 1992)
      - (17) Victoire Ducruet (b. 2023)
      - (18) Constance Ducruet (b. 2024)
    - (19) Pauline Ducruet (b. 1994)
    - Camille Gottlieb (b. 1998)

A person born to a dynast who was not married to the other parent at the time of birth (such as Alexandre Grimaldi-Coste, Camille Gottlieb or Raphaël Elmaleh) does not have any succession rights unless legitimized by his or her parents' subsequent marriage (Civil Code 229 states: "Les enfants légitimés par le mariage subséquent auront les mêmes droits que s'ils étaient nés de ce mariage"). Louis and Pauline Ducruet, Alexandre (Sasha) Casiraghi and Balthazar Rassam have been legitimised by their parents' subsequent marriages. Jazmin Grace Grimaldi cannot be legitimated through her parents subsequent marriage because her mother's divorce proceedings were not finalized by the time of Jazmin's birth. As such, Jazmin is legally the product of adultery and cannot be legitimated through the subsequent marriage of her biological parents.

== 2002 changes ==
Until 2002, the crown of Monaco could pass only to the direct descendants, including adopted children, of the reigning prince. As a result, Princess Antoinette was not in the line of succession, and Princesses Caroline and Stéphanie would have lost their places in line at the moment of Prince Albert's accession, and there would be no further dynasts eligible to succeed to the throne.

This possibility had two implications, namely that a) the throne might fall vacant and Monaco might officially become a protectorate of France should Prince Albert inherit the crown and then die without fathering or adopting a legitimate heir or b) Prince Albert might adopt an unrelated person as his heir, thereby breaking the genealogical line of the House of Grimaldi. In 2002, changes were made to the Constitution of Monaco which eliminated that concern by excluding adopted children from the line of succession and providing that, if the sovereign has no legitimate child, the crown passes to one of the dynastic siblings of the sovereign or, if not living, to one of their legitimate descendants.

== See also ==
- List of rulers of Monaco
- Monaco succession crisis of 1918
