= Monaco-Ville =

Monaco-Ville Monaco-Ville (French) Mùnegu Autu (Monégasque)
- Ward
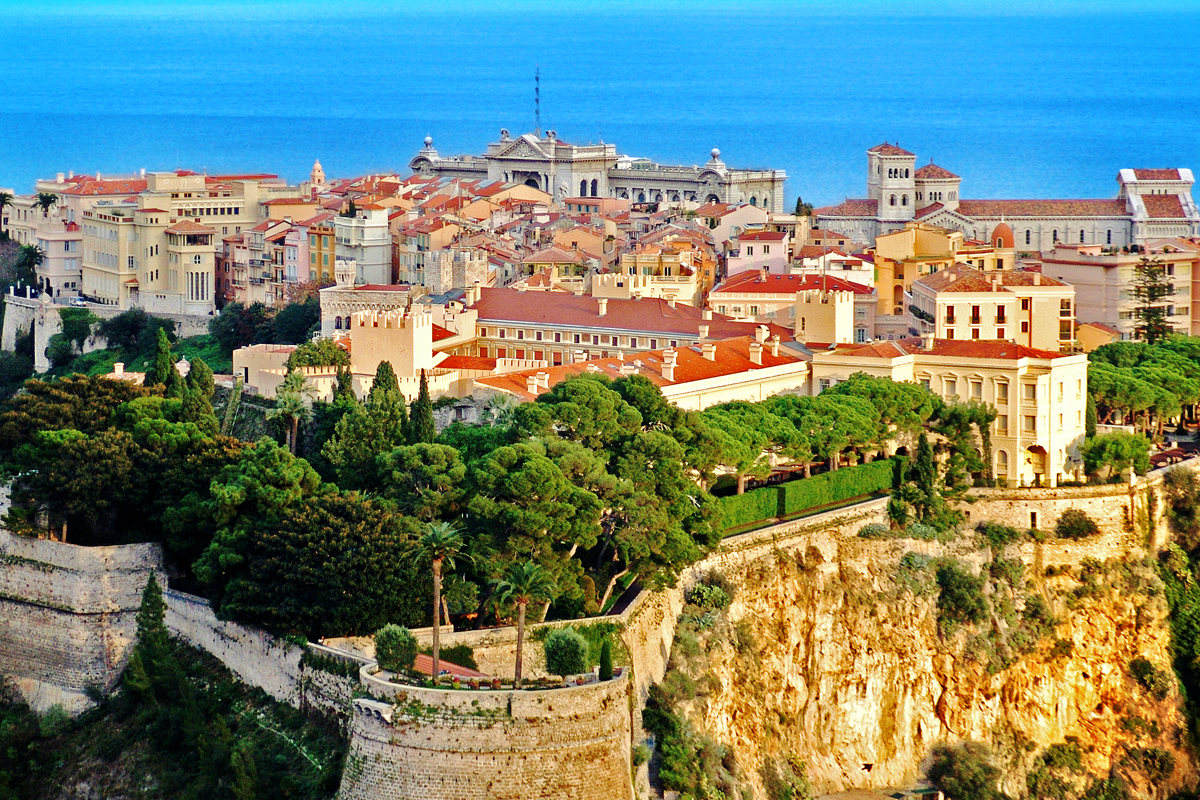
- View of Monaco City
- Nicknames: The Rock; Monaco-Ville
- Location in Monaco
- Coordinates: 43°43′51.24″N 7°25′26.76″E
- Country: Monaco

Area
  - Land: 19.6491 ha (48.554 acres)

Population (2008)
  - Total: 975
  - Density: 4,962/km^{2} (12,850/sq mi)

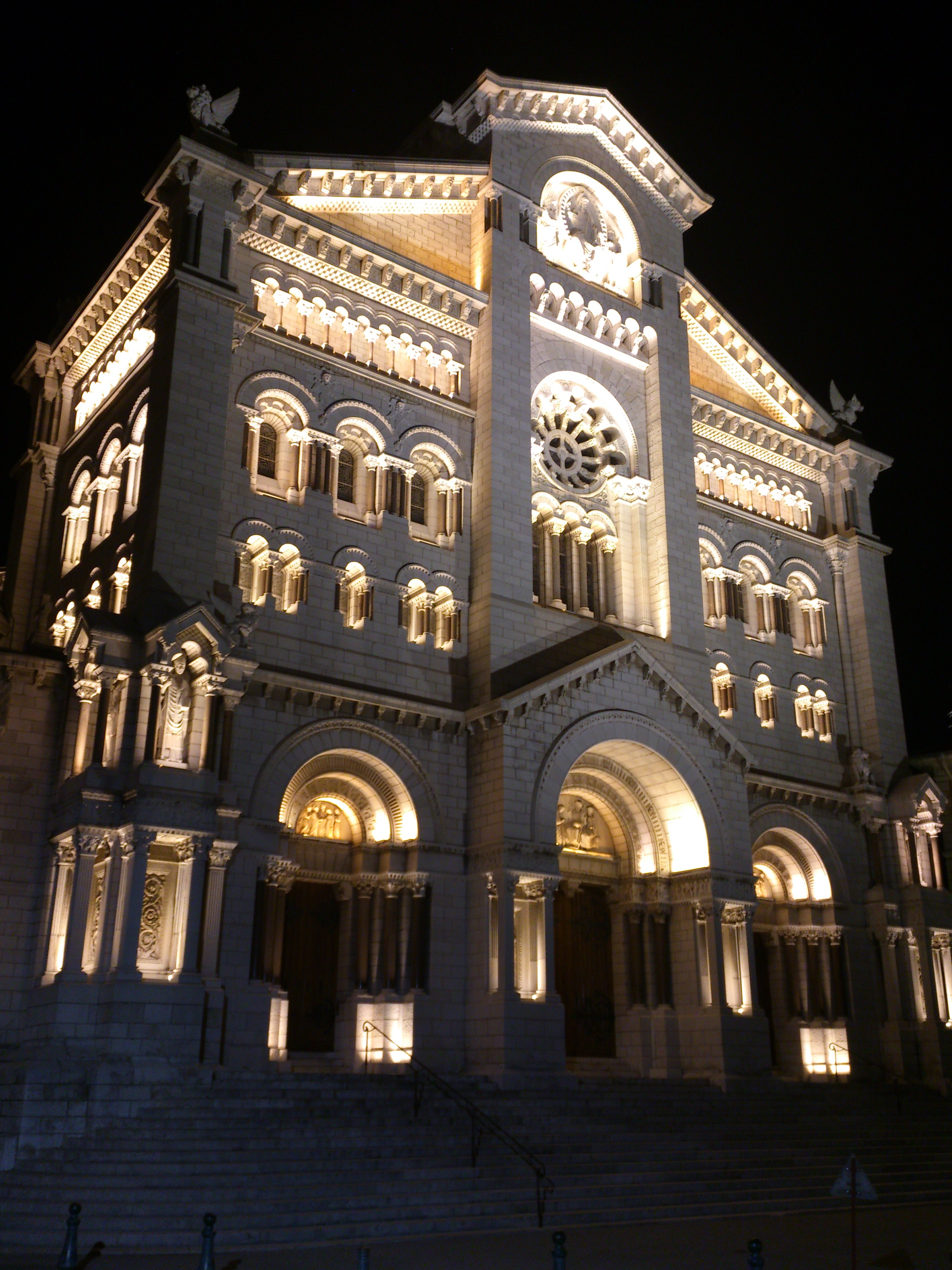
Immaculate Conception Cathedral in Monaco City

Monaco-Ville ([mɔnakɔ vil]; Monégasque: Mu̍negu-A̍utu) is the southcentral ward in the Principality of Monaco. Located on a headland that extends into the Mediterranean Sea, it is nicknamed The Rock (French: Le Rocher; Monégasque: A Roca). It holds most of the country's political and judicial institutions: the Prince's Palace, the town hall, the government, the National Council (parliament of Monaco), the Municipal Council, the courts and a prison (hanging on The Rock).

== Geography ==
Monaco-Ville is one of the four traditional quarters (French: quartiers) of Monaco; the others are La Condamine, Monte Carlo, and Fontvieille. It is located at 43°43′51″N 7°25′26″E and has an estimated population of 975. It has 19.64 hectares (48.5 acres) of surface area and is located between the districts of Fontvieille and La Condamine.

== History ==
Monaco-Ville was originally called Monoikos in Greek, after the temple of Hercules Monoikos, located in a Phocaean colony of the 6th century BCE. During its history, Monoikos changed hands numerous times. It became Monaco in the Middle Ages. Some of the city walls and original structures still remain.

It was here that the Phocaeans of Massalia (now Marseille) founded the colony of Monoïkos in the 6th century BC. Monoikos was associated with Hercules, who was worshipped as Hercules Monoecus. According to the works of Hercules, but also according to Diodorus of Sicily and Strabo, the Greeks and the Ligurians reported that Hercules had passed through the region.

On 10 June 1215, a detachment of Ghibellines led by Fulco del Cassello began the construction of a fortress on the rock of Monaco in order to make it a strategic military position and a means of controlling the area.

They also established dwellings at the base of the Rock to support the garrisons. To attract the inhabitants of Genoa and the surrounding towns, they offered land and exempted newcomers from taxes.

On 8 January 1297, François Grimaldi, descendant of Otto Canella, consul of Genoa in 1133, took over the fortress. Although he had a small army, he disguised himself as a Franciscan friar to enter, before opening the gates to his soldiers. This episode gave rise to his nickname, Malizia ("malice"). This is why today the arms of Monaco bear two Franciscans armed with a sword.

== Landmarks ==
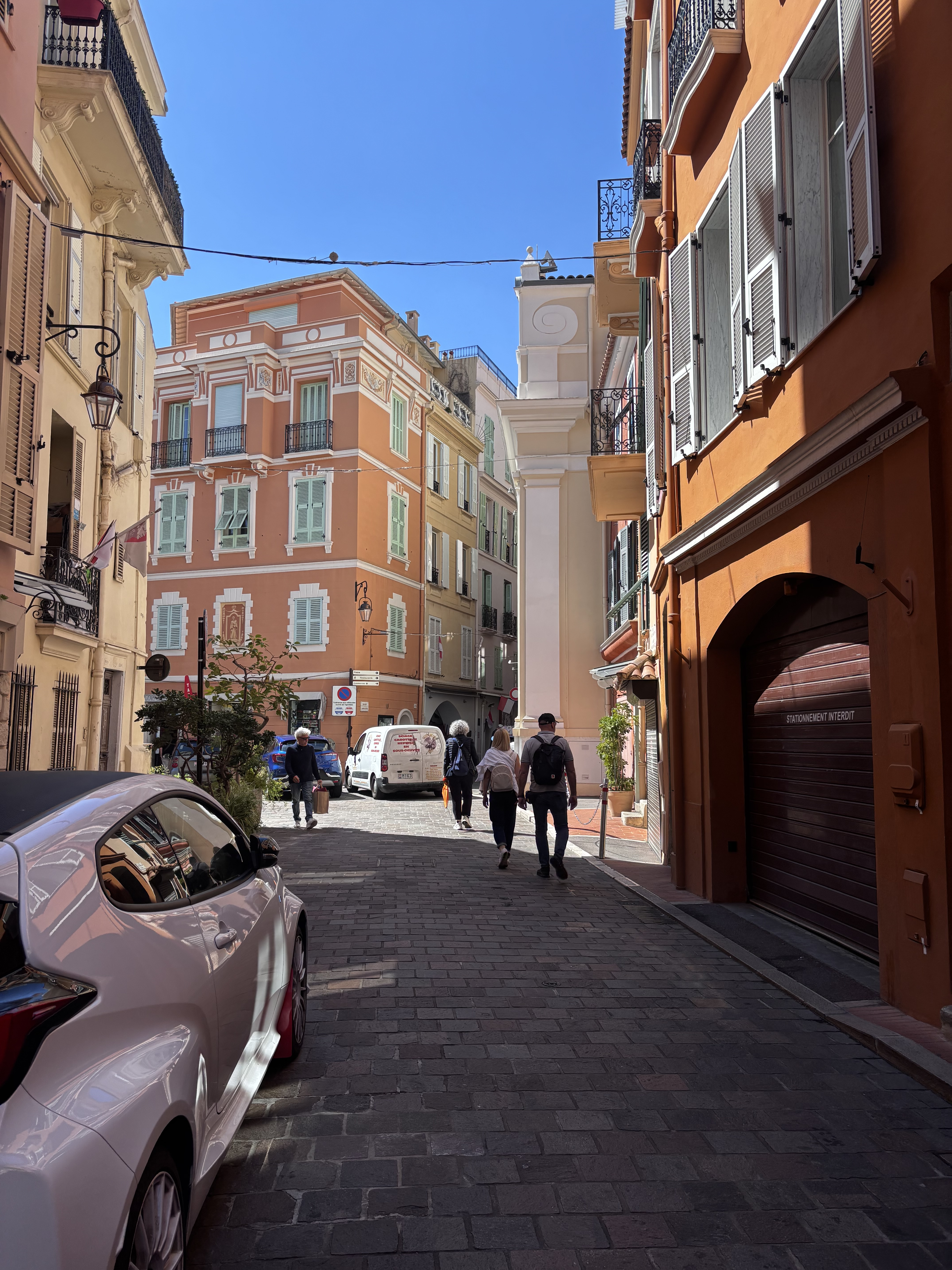
View of the Old Town’s ‘caruggi’

Despite being located in the middle of the City of Monaco, the world's most densely populated urban center, Monaco-Ville remains a medieval village at heart, made up almost entirely of quiet pedestrian streets and marked by virtual silence after sundown. Though innumerable people visit Monaco-Ville and the palace square, only local vehicles are allowed up to the Rock, and gasoline-powered motorcycles are prohibited after 10 p.m.

- Prince's Palace of Monaco. The colorful changing of the guard occurs every day outside the Palais at 11:55 a.m.
- Cathedral of Our Lady Immaculate (French: Cathédrale de Monaco), a Romanesque-Byzantine Catholic church that contains the remains of many members of Monaco's ruling family.
- The Oceanographic Museum, established by Albert I, Prince of Monaco in 1910.
- Chapel of Mercy, built in 1639, one of the oldest buildings in the principality. It is famous for being the starting point of a torchlit religious procession by local residents that takes place on the eve of Good Friday each year.
- St Martin Gardens, a small park of rocky paths that cling to the rock.
- Museum of the Chapel of Visitation, a 17th-century Roman Catholic chapel and art museum.
- Fort Antoine Theatre, an amphitheater at the bottom of the rock.

== Notable residents ==
- Albert II, Prince of Monaco, reigning Prince of Monaco and founder of a foundation for ocean conservation and renewable energy, recipient of the UN Champions of the Earth Environmental Award
- Beatrice Borromeo, Italian journalist and socialite
- Andrea Casiraghi, Monégasque royal
- Charlotte Casiraghi, Monégasque royal
- Pierre Casiraghi, Monégasque royal
- Stefano Casiraghi, Italian socialite
- Tatiana Casiraghi, Colombian-American socialite
- Ghislaine Dommanget, French actress, Princess of Monaco
- Daniel Ducruet, Carabinier in the Compagnie des Carabiniers du Prince
- Louis Ducruet, Monégasque royal
- Gad Elmaleh, Moroccan actor
- Philippe Gilbert, Belgian cyclist
- Camille Gottlieb, Monégasque royal
- Albert Grimaldi, Prince of Monaco
- Caroline Grimaldi, Princess of Hanover, Princess of Monaco
- Gabriella Grimaldi, Princess of Monaco
- Jacques Grimaldi, Prince of Monaco
- Rainier Grimaldi, Prince of Monaco
- Stéphanie Grimaldi, Princess of Monaco
- Alexandra Hanover, Princess of Hanover
- Grace Kelly, American actress, Princess of Monaco
- Charlene Wittstock, South African swimmer, Princess of Monaco
- Charles Leclerc, Monégasque Formula 1 driver

== Gallery ==
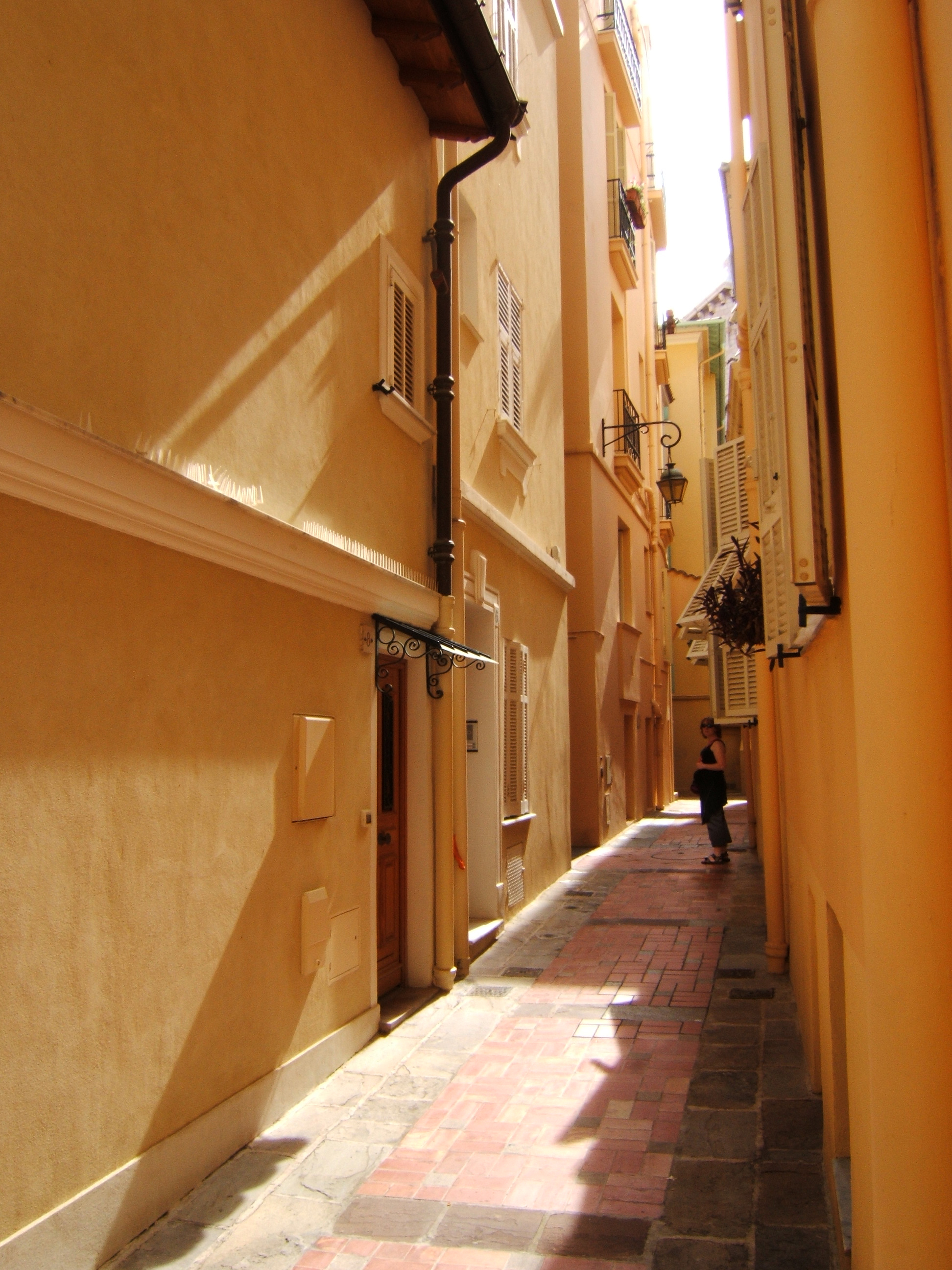
A street in Monaco-Ville

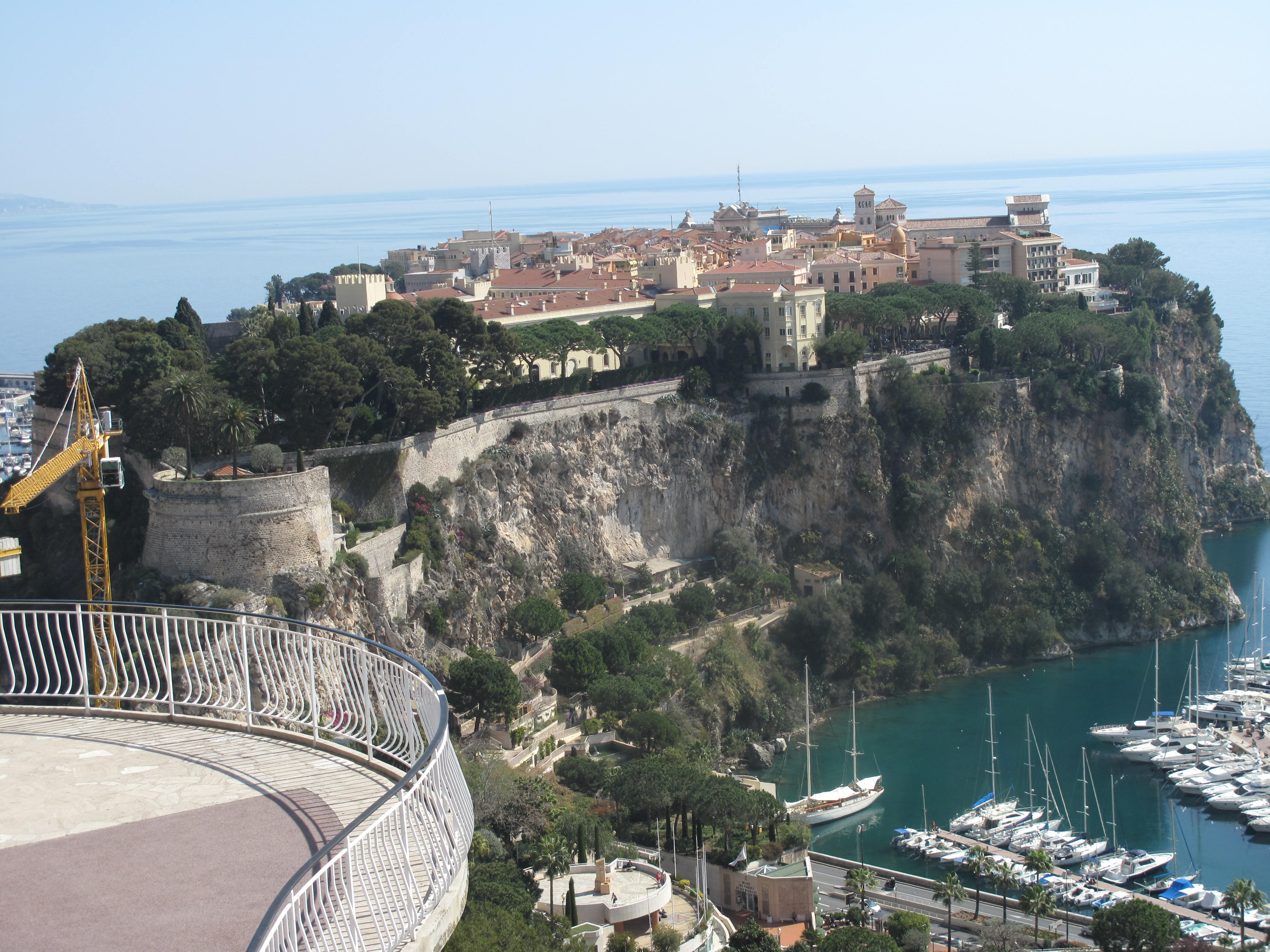
The Rock of Monaco from Monaco's exotic garden

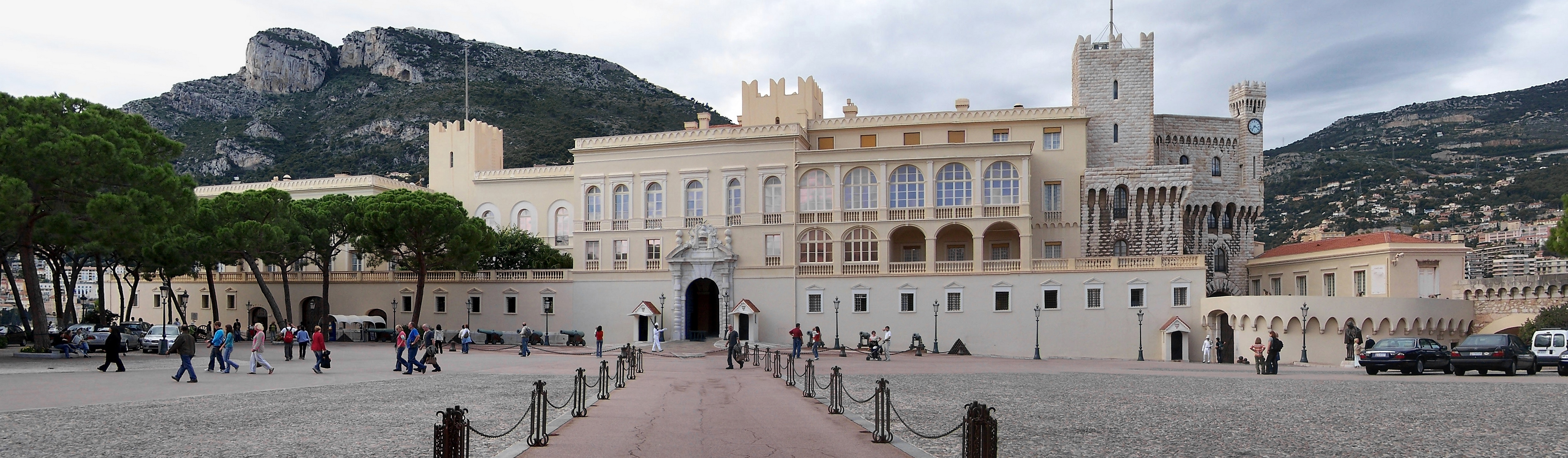
The Prince's Palace of Monaco

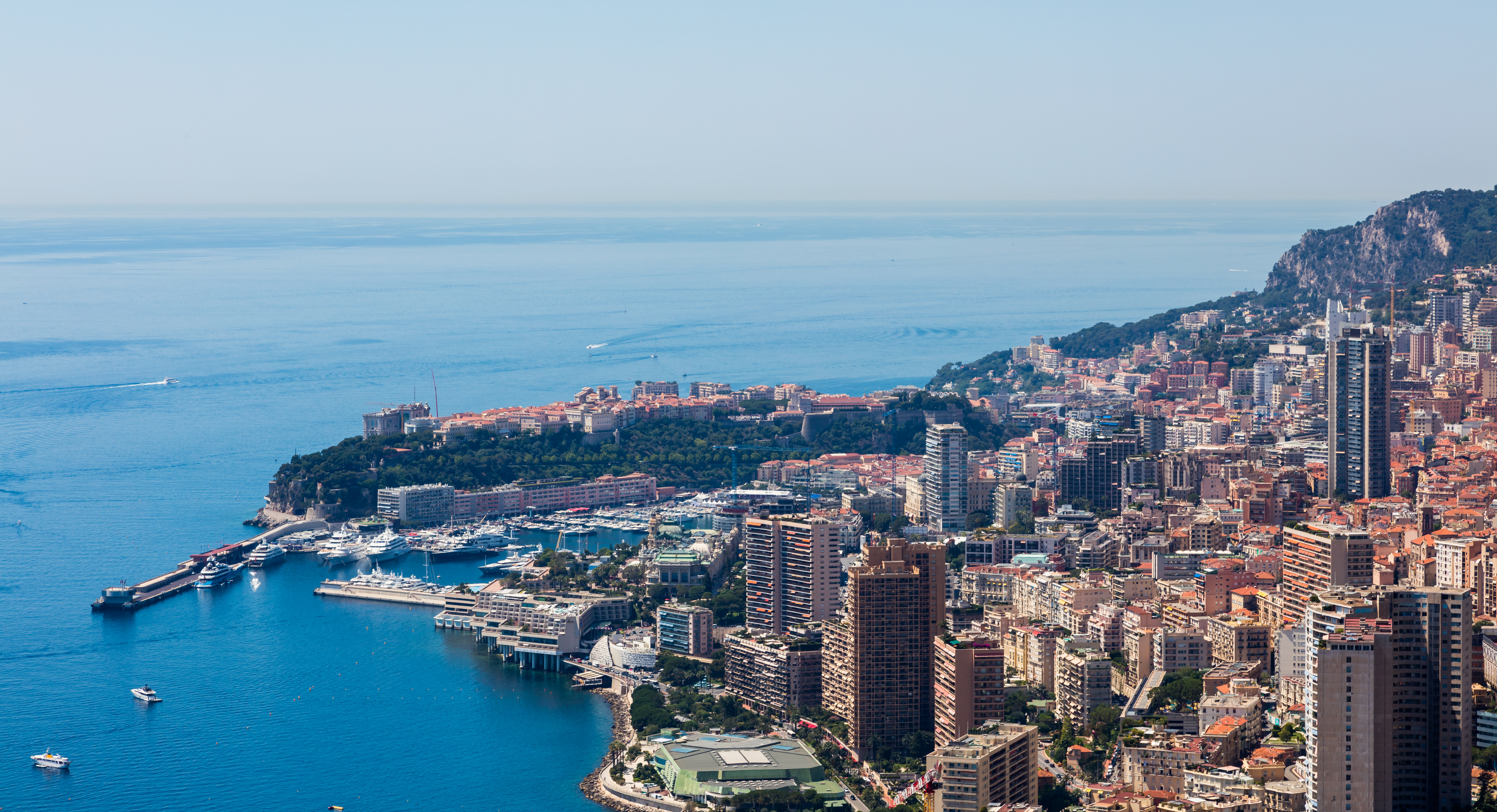
View of Monaco-Ville from the east

== See also ==
- Municipality of Monaco
