= ESC Lille =

French business school

Coordinates: 50°38′14″N 3°04′24″E

ESC Lille School of Management
- Motto: leadership, negotiation, responsibility, problem-solving, integrity, team spirit
- Type: Grande Ecole
- Established: 1892
- Undergraduates: 1800
- Postgraduates: 550
- Location: Paris-Lille, France
- Affiliations: EQUIS
- Website: www.esc-lille.com

ESC Lille is a French business school founded in 1892. It has two campuses, one in Lille and one in Paris. ESC Lille is EQUIS accredited by the EFMD (European Foundation for Management Education) and the Conference Of The Grandes Ecoles. In 2005, it was the first European business school to be accredited by Project Management Institute’s Global Accreditation Center for Project Management (GACPM), and is still the only PMI-accredited business school in France. In July 2009 the union of Ceram Business School and ESC Lille was announced. It will create the largest French business school in terms of student numbers. The new school, named Skema Business School (School of Knowledge Economy and MAnagement), span three sites in France in Lille, Paris and Sophia Antipolis near Nice and three sites: in China (Suzhou) United States (Raleigh, NC) and Brazil (Belo Orizonte).

In May 2019 SKEMA Business School announced the opening of a new site in Cape Town (South Africa) and the possibility to enter in Russia and India.

== Ranking ==
In 2009, the ESC Lille Grande Ecole Programme ranked 14th in the Financial Times ranking of European Masters in Management.

In 2008, the school was ranked #47 in the "European Business School ranking" of Financial Times.
