= Pauline Ducruet =

Monegasque royal

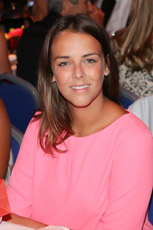
- Ducruet in 2016
- Born: Pauline Grace Maguy Ducruet; 4 May 1994 (age 32); Monaco
- Height: 166 cm (5 ft 5 in)
- Parent(s): Daniel Ducruet; Princess Stéphanie of Monaco
- Relatives: Louis Ducruet (brother)

Pauline Grace Maguy Ducruet (French pronunciation: [polin ɡʁɑs maɡi dykʁʏ.ɥɛ] born 4 May 1994) is a Monegasque diver, designer and niece of Prince Albert II of Monaco, through her mother, Princess Stéphanie of Monaco.

== Early life ==
Ducruet was born on 4 May 1994 at Princess Grace Hospital Centre in La Colle, Monaco. She is the second child of Princess Stéphanie of Monaco and Daniel Ducruet. Her parents subsequently married in a civil ceremony on 1 July 1995. She has an older brother (Louis) and three half-siblings. Her half-brother Michael is the son of Daniel Ducruet and Martine Malbouvier. Her half-sister, Camille Gottlieb, is the daughter of Princess Stéphanie and Jean-Raymond Gottlieb. Her other half-sister, Linoué Ducruet, is the daughter of Daniel Ducruet and Kelly Marie Carla Lancien.

== Education ==
Ducruet received a baccalaureate, literary section, from Lycée Prince Albert I de Monaco. She received her French Baccalauréat degree in July 2011. In 2012, she studied at Monaco's language school.

== Career ==
For three years, Ducruet was a stylist apprentice at the Instituto Marangoni in Paris. In 2015, Ducruet went to study fashion design in New York; part of her studies were a five-month internship at Vogue and a six-month internship at Louis Vuitton. She received an associate degree in Fashion Design from Parsons The New School for Design (2015–2017).

In June 2017, Ducruet partnered with Maria Zarco in the launch of Altered Designs, a fashion company the two women publicize via Instagram. In 2022, she was selected for Forbes 30 Under 30 in Monaco.

== Diving ==
Ducruet is a competitive diver. In 2010, she represented Monaco at the World Junior Diving Championships in Aachen, Germany, and in July 2010, she competed in the European Junior Swimming and Diving Championships in Helsinki, Finland. In August 2010, she was part of the Monaco delegation at the 2010 Summer Youth Olympics in Singapore.

=== Competitive results ===
- 6th in 1-meter springboard at the international meeting in Eindhoven, The Netherlands
- 5th in the 1-meter springboard championships in France Winter Youth in Angers, France
- 2nd jumps of 1 and 3-meter championships in France Youth Summer School in Strasbourg
- 19th and 22nd at the European Championships in Helsinki
- a finalist in the 3-meter springboard in the 1st Youth Olympics in Singapore. (final result: 12th place of 13 divers)
- 18th FINA Junior Diving World Championships
  - Group A Girls 1m (16–18) – (Prelim/Quarterfinal) 21
  - Group A Girls 3m (16–18) – (Prelim/Quarterfinal) 29

On 5 November 2010, Ducruet was nominated as "Sportsperson of the year" for the 2009–2010 season.

== Other interests ==
Ducruet's earliest activities include the training of elephants in the circus of Franco Knie. In 2004, she was involved in gymnastics; her mother is president of Monaco's gymnastics federation.

As of December 2011, according to Princess Stephanie, Pauline was assisting her with all aspects of the 2012 International Circus Festival of Monte-Carlo. She also founded and presides over the jury of the "New Generation" circus festival in Monaco, specifically for people under 20 years of age.

== Succession ==
Ducruet is a niece of Prince Albert II of Monaco, and is currently 19th in the line of succession to the Monegasque throne.

Pauline Ducruet House of Grimaldi Born: 4 May 1994
Lines of succession
Preceded by Victoire Ducruet	Succession to the Monegasque throne 17th in line	Last in line
