= Chapel of Mercy, Monaco-Ville =

Church in Monaco

Coordinates: 43°43′52.18″N 7°25′24.39″E

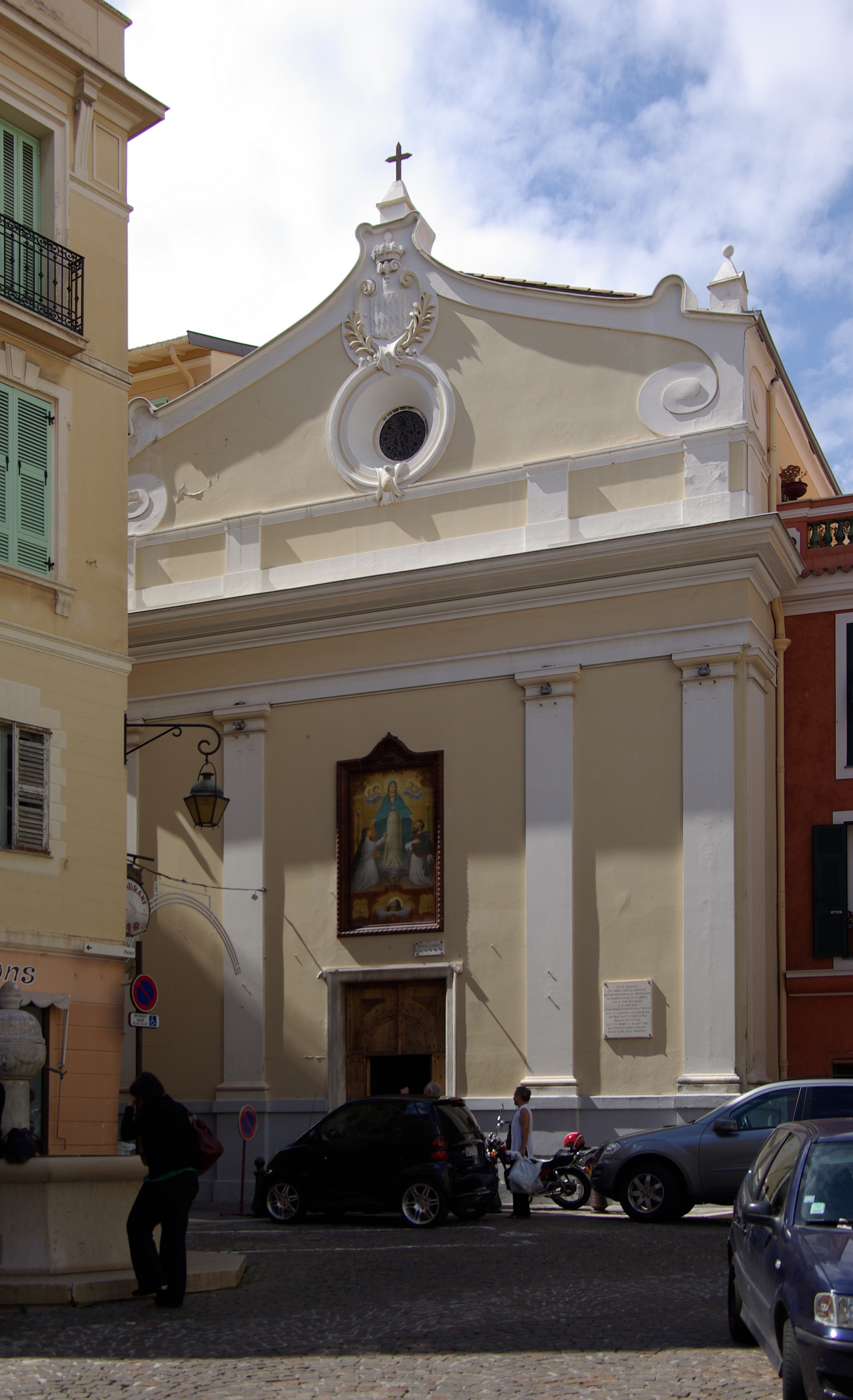
Chapel of Mercy

The Chapel of Mercy (French: La Chapelle de la Miséricorde; Monégasque: Capela d’a Miserico̍rdia) is a Roman Catholic church on the Rue Basse in Monaco's Monaco-Ville district.

The chapel was built in 1639 and served as the seat of the Brotherhood of the Black Penitents. Honoré II, Prince of Monaco, served as the brotherhood's first prior. The church was deconsecrated from 1793 until 1824. The interior decoration features wooden sculpture by François Joseph Bosio.
