= Daniel Ducruet =

Monegasque noble (born 1964)

- Born: 27 November 1964 (age 61); Beausoleil, Alpes-Maritimes, France
- Spouse(s): Sandra Naccache (divorced) Princess Stéphanie of Monaco (m. 1995; div. 1996) Kelly Marie Lancien (m. 2018)
- Children: Michaël Ducruet; Louis Ducruet; Pauline Ducruet; Linoué Ducruet

Daniel Ducruet (French: [dykʁʏ.ɥɛ]; born 27 November 1964) is a former husband of Princess Stéphanie of Monaco, to whom he was married in 1995 and divorced from a year later in 1996.

Two of his children, Louis and Pauline, are 16th and 19th in the line of succession to the Monegasque throne.

== Early life ==
Ducruet was born in Beausoleil, Alpes-Maritimes to Henri Ducruet, a manual laborer and his wife Marguerite [Maguy] (née Barbero), a homemaker.

Ducruet attended the University of Nice but dropped out after a year. He worked as a bodybuilder, pet shop clerk and a fishmonger before being accepted into Monaco's police force as a trainee officer in 1986.

Within two years he had been appointed a Palace bodyguard with responsibility for Prince Albert. In 1991, he was appointed by Prince Rainier to accompany his daughter Princess Stéphanie as bodyguard on her ill-fated tour to promote her record album.

== Personal life ==
Ducruet's first marriage to Sandra Naccache ended in divorce in the mid-1980s.

Ducruet's girlfriend Martine Malbouvier was six months pregnant with his first child when he went public with his relationship with Princess Stéphanie. His first son, Michaël Ducruet, was born in February 1992. On 26 November 1992, ten months after the birth of his first child, Ducruet had a second son, Louis Ducruet, with Princess Stéphanie.

Stéphanie campaigned long and hard for her father to approve a marriage between her and Ducruet, since he was reluctant to sanction a marriage between the two. Only after the birth of their second child, a daughter Pauline Grace Maguy Ducruet, born on 4 May 1994, and his own double-bypass surgery did Prince Rainier give his blessing. Louis and Pauline Ducruet were legitimated by their parents' marriage and are currently 15th and 16th in line of succession to the Monégasque throne.

On 1 July 1995 Ducruet and Princess Stéphanie were married in a civil ceremony at the Monaco town hall.

Ducruet and Princess Stéphanie jointly invested in the Replay Store and Replay Cafe in Monaco.

In September 1996, Ducruet's infidelity with Muriel "Fili" Mol-Houteman, Miss Bare Breasts of Belgium 1995, was photographed by the paparazzi and the images were published in the Italian tabloids Evatremila and Gente. Ducruet said that he was set up. At the height of the scandal, a 90-minute video of Ducruet's encounter with Houteman sold in Italy. When the story made headlines, Ducruet fled to Morocco. Upon his return he met with his wife who then submitted, to her father, a written request for a divorce, dated 16 September 1996. Princess Stéphanie divorced Ducruet on 4 October 1996.

After the divorce, Stéphanie bought his share of their joint business interest in Replay Restaurant on Rue Grimaldi.

Currently, Ducruet is married to Kelly Marie Carla Lancien. They have a daughter, Linoué.

== Life after Princess Stéphanie ==
Ducruet has since launched a career as a singer releasing two albums, Pourquoi Pas and Jamais personne, with little success. He also wrote a book about his life with the Grimaldi family.

In 2004 he has taken part in the Italian reality TV show La Fattoria and the similar French reality TV show La Ferme Célébrités, where he finished second. Also in 2004 he hosted Real TV, the Italian version of Real TV, on Italia 1.

Ducruet owns a nightclub in Cannes called Le Caliente. He came under fire in 2008 when a photo resurfaced, apparently taken the previous year, showing a nude woman in the nightclub. He and his business partner, Jean-Pierre Roméo, were charged by the court in Grasse with "undermining the privacy of private life," even though the woman was in public, so "privacy" does not apply. Ducruet and Roméo were accused of having broadcast the photo on 31 August 2008 without the woman's consent. The woman was a minor at the time (17 years old) but in 2010 the case was dismissed.

Ducruet and his son, Louis Ducruet, are, since 2016, the co-managers of the Monaco-based company Monadeco.

== Breach of privacy lawsuit ==
After the publication of the compromising photographs and video footage of Ducruet and Muriel "Fili" Mol-Houteman, Ducruet took legal action.

He claimed that Mol-Houteman had conspired with photographer Stephane de Lisiecki and his assistant Yves Hoogewys to breach his privacy for financial gain. He also claimed that Mol-Houteman drugged his champagne.

Mol-Houteman received a six-month suspended sentence, while Lisiecki and Hoogewys were given one-year suspended sentences. Ducruet was awarded $27,930 in damages by the court for breaches of privacy.
