= Camille Gottlieb =

Monegasque campaigners and influencer

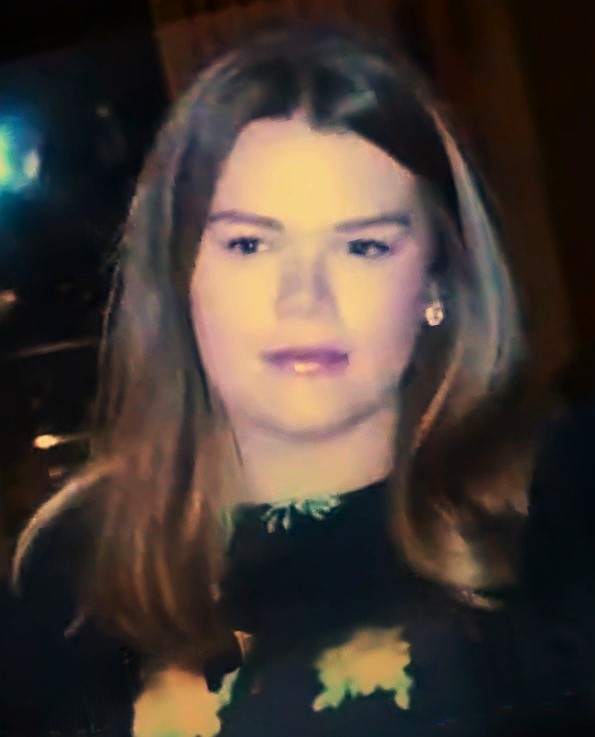
- Gottlieb in 2018
- Born: Camille Marie Kelly Gottlieb; 15 July 1998 (age 28)
- Citizenship: Monaco
- Education: University of Nice
- Occupations: Campaigner, influencer
- Organization: Be Safe Monaco
- Parent(s): Jean Raymond Gottlieb; Princess Stéphanie of Monaco

Camille Marie Kelly Gottlieb (born 15 July 1998) is an anti-drunk-driving campaigner, influencer and relative of the Monegasque princely family. She is the daughter of Princess Stéphanie of Monaco and the grand-daughter of Grace Kelly.

== Biography ==
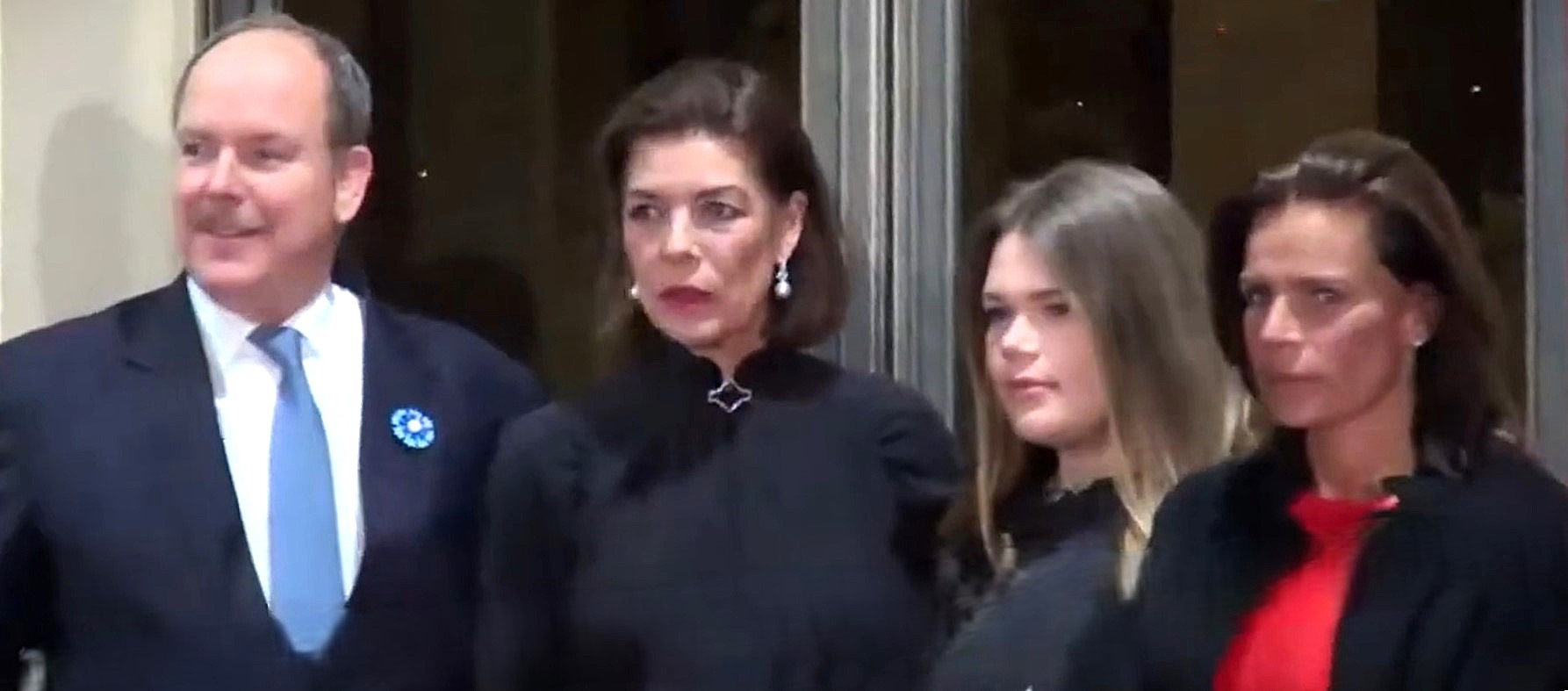
Left to right: Prince Albert, Princess Caroline, Camille Gottlieb, Princess Stéphanie at tribute to Grace Kelly in 2018

Born in 1998, Gottlieb's parents are Princess Stéphanie of Monaco and Jean Raymond Gottlieb; her parents met when her father worked as her mother's bodyguard. Since her parents did not marry, she is not in the line of succession. She studied at the University of Nice for a degree in Literature.

Since graduation, Gottlieb has worked with a number of charities, including establishing Be Safe Monaco, which campaigns against drink-driving. Gottlieb founded this charity after a friend died whilst riding a scooter having consumed alcohol above safe levels to drive. Gottlieb is a teetotal. Her activism also extends to animal rights.

Comparisons have been drawn by magazines such as Harper's Bazaar and Tatler, between her and her grandmother, the actress Grace Kelly, since they share physical similarities. The New York Post has also described Gottlieb as a fashion influencer due to her social media presence.
