= 1523 =

1523 in various calendars
- Gregorian calendar: 1523; MDXXIII
- Ab urbe condita: 2276
- Armenian calendar: 972; ԹՎ ՋՀԲ
- Assyrian calendar: 6273
- Balinese saka calendar: 1444–1445
- Bengali calendar: 929–930
- Berber calendar: 2473
- English Regnal year: 14 Hen. 8 – 15 Hen. 8
- Buddhist calendar: 2067
- Burmese calendar: 885
- Byzantine calendar: 7031–7032
- Chinese calendar: 壬午年 (Water Horse); 4220 or 4013 — to — 癸未年 (Water Goat); 4221 or 4014
- Coptic calendar: 1239–1240
- Discordian calendar: 2689
- Ethiopian calendar: 1515–1516
- Hebrew calendar: 5283–5284
- Hindu calendars
- Vikram Samvat: 1579–1580
- Shaka Samvat: 1444–1445
- Kali Yuga: 4623–4624
- Holocene calendar: 11523
- Igbo calendar: 523–524
- Iranian calendar: 901–902
- Islamic calendar: 929–930
- Japanese calendar: Daiei 3 (大永３年)
- Javanese calendar: 1440–1442
- Julian calendar: 1523; MDXXIII
- Korean calendar: 3856
- Minguo calendar: 389 before ROC 民前389年
- Nanakshahi calendar: 55
- Thai solar calendar: 2065–2066
- Tibetan calendar: ཆུ་ཕོ་རྟ་ལོ་ (male Water-Horse); 1649 or 1268 or 496 — to — ཆུ་མོ་ལུག་ལོ་ (female Water-Sheep); 1650 or 1269 or 497

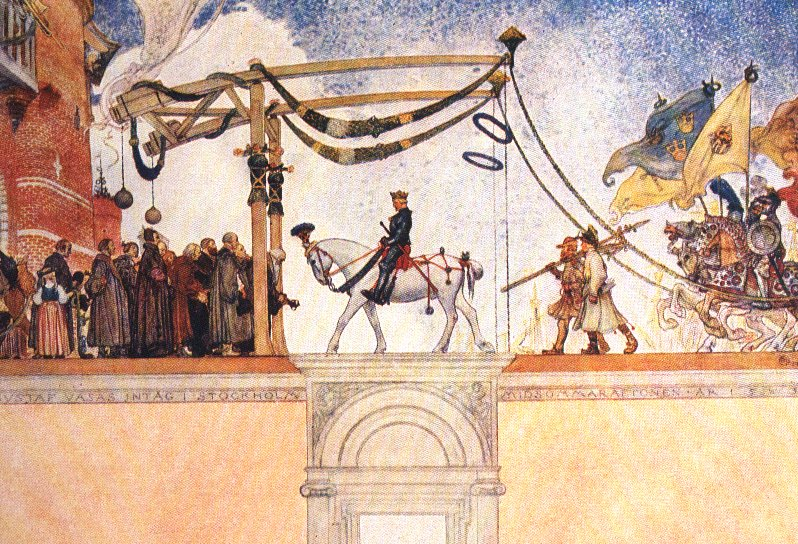
June 24: King Gustav of Sweden enters Stockholm and secures Sweden's independence from the Kalmar Union (painting by Carl Larsson)

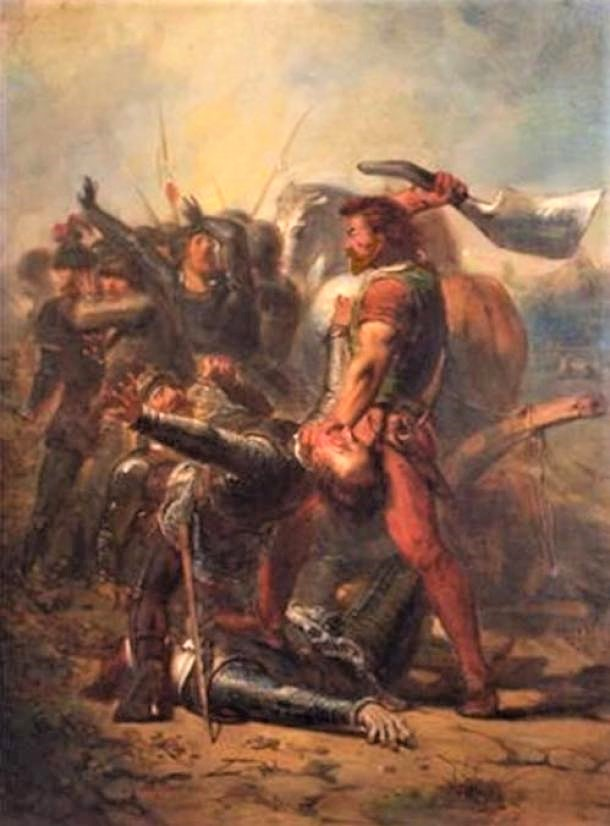
July 7: The Frisian rebellion ends, fought by the Arumer Black Heap

Year 1523 (MDXXIII) was a common year starting on Thursday of the Julian calendar.

== Events ==
=== January–March ===
- January 20 – King Christian II of Denmark and Norway is forced to abdicate after the nobles of the herredag at Viborg have renounced their allegiance in favour of his uncle, Frederick, Duke of Holstein. Christian is exiled to the Netherlands in April.
- February 15 – Construction of Fort Kastela by Portuguese invaders, on what is now the island of Ternate in Indonesia, is completed as Portugal claims the Spice Islands (now the Maluku Islands).
- February 25 – Battle of al-Shihr on the Arabian Peninsula (in what is now Yemen): Troops from Portugal fight against the Kathiri Sultanate, ruled by the Emir Mutran bin Mansur. After a battle of one day, the Portuguese sack the capital, Al-Shihr, and establish a port on the Indian Ocean.
- February 27 – Captain Antón Mayor formally claims for Spain what is now Nicaragua, after he arrives with Andrés Niño and other Spanish troops on the Central American coast at El Realejo.
- March 8 – In Spain's Kingdom of Valencia, a rebellion by the Brotherhoods of Mallorca is suppressed after two years, as the rebels surrender their capital, Palma de Mallorca, to Spanish and German troops.
- March 26 – Frederick I is provisionally declared as King of Denmark by Danish nobles at Viborg, although loyalists at Copenhagen refuse to recognize his claim to the throne.

=== April–June ===
- April 4 – Under a plan organized by Sister Katharina von Bora and Protestant reformer Martin Luther, fish merchant Leonhard Köppe helps carry out the rescue of Von Bora and other Cistercian Catholic nuns from the Nimbschen Abbey in Germany near Grimma and Leipzig. On the day before Easter, Köppe arrives at the convent under the pretext of bringing delivering herring and other foods to the Abbey, then uses empty barrels to smuggle the nuns to Wittenberg. Von Bora will later become Luther's wife.
- April 12 – The Spanish conquest of Nicaragua continues as Gil González Dávila and 17 other soldiers arrive at Lake Nicaragua and claim it for the Spanish crown, calling the freshwater source the Mar Dulce. Gonzalez and 100 men with him have been welcomed by Macuilmiquiztli Nicarao, leader of the friendly Nicarao people, to explore the area.
- April 14 – Mirza Shah Hossein, Grand Vizier of Persia since 1514, is assassinated in Qazvin (now in Iran) by Shia nobles of the Qizilbash sect, and replaced by Jalal al-Din Mohammad Tabrizi.
- April 15 – Sir Thomas More, noted for being a Catholic social philosopher and author of the 1516 novel Utopia, is appointed by King Henry VIII as the Speaker of the English House of Commons for the first parliamentary session since 1515. He serves until the Parliament adjourns on August 15.
- April 17 – In Nicaragua, Diriangén, ruler of the Chorotega speakers, stages an attack on the Spanish invaders led by González Dávila. Having been warned by one of the Nicarao natives of the intended surprise attack, Spanish defenders on horses rout the Chorotega, but several of the Spaniards are wounded. The Spanish then decide to proceed no further inland.
- April 23 – Charles V, Holy Roman Emperor, brings the Spanish Inquisition to the Netherlands with the appointment of Frans Van der Hulst as the inquisitor general of the Seventeen Provinces, which will later become parts of the Belgium, France, Luxembourg and the southern Netherlands.
- April 24 – The Diet of Hungary, parliament for the Kingdom of Hungary under King Lajos II, passes a decree ordering the confiscation of property and execution of all followers of Martin Luther within the Kingdom.
- May 6 – In the Rhineland in Germany, the Knights' War, led by Franz von Sickingen since August 27, is finally put down at Landstuhl by troops of the Holy Roman Empire as the Nanstein Castle falls. Sickingen, mortally wounded in the final battle, dies of his wounds the next day.
- May 5 – An assassination attempt is made against King Sigismund of Poland, who is shot at while walking outside his residence at Wawel Castle overlooking Kraków.
- May 20 – Andrea Gritti is elected as the new Doge of the Republic of Venice, 13 days after the death of Antonio Grimani.
- May 27 – Swedish War of Liberation: The city of Kalmar in Sweden, occupied by troops of Denmark, falls to a Swedish Army force led by Arvid Västgöte after the city's magistrates agree to leave the northern gate of the city open. Kalmar Castle surrenders on June 4. With the fall of Kalmar, only Stockholm remains as a site of the Danish occupation.
- May 31 – Following the Battle of Xicaowan at sea between the ships of the Chinese Empire and the Kingdom of Portugal, the Malay ambassador to China reluctantly departs from Guangzhou to present letters to the Portuguese governors of the occupied Malacca Sultanate, demanding the restoration of the deposed Sultan. Though fearing execution by the Portuguese, the messengers are allowed to leave. They return in September with a plea for help from the Malay Sultan, whose territory is under attack from the Europeans.
- May – The Ningbo incident: Two rival trade delegations from Japan feud in the Chinese city of Ningbo, resulting in the pillage and plunder of the city.
- June 3 – Santhome Church is established by Portuguese explorers over the tomb of Saint Thomas the Apostle at Madras (now Chennai) in India.
- June 6 – Gustav Vasa is elected king of Sweden, establishing the full independence of Sweden from the Kalmar Union, which marks the end of the Kalmar Union. This event is also traditionally considered to be the establishment of the modern Swedish nation.
- June 10 – Frederick begins the 8-day siege of Copenhagen, the capital of Denmark. The city surrenders on 6 January 1524.
- June 12–July 19 – Franconian War: The Swabian League destroys 23 robber baron castles.
- June 17 – Swedish War of Liberation: The surrender of Stockholm by Denmark is accepted by Sweden's King Gustav Vasa. In return, the city's defenders are allowed safe passage out of Sweden. King Gustav then makes his triumphant entry to the city on June 24.
- June 23 – The Spanish expedition into Nicaragua ends as the Europeans arrive back in Panama in canoes, having been forced to abandon their ships.
- June 27 – Pargali Ibrahim Pasha is appointed as Grand Vizier of the Ottoman Empire by Suleiman the Magnificent. He will serve as the Ottoman administrator for almost 13 years until his sudden arrest and execution in 1536.

=== July–September ===
- July 1 – Jan van Essen and Hendrik Vos become the first Lutheran martyrs, burned at the stake in Brussels at the Grote Markt. In response to the executions, Martin Luther composed a hymn called "A New Song Be By Us Begun".
- July 7 – Wijerd Jelckama, a Frisian warlord and military commander, is executed in Leeuwarden, ending the Frisian rebellion fought by the Arumer Black Heap.
- July 25 – In what is now Mexico, the conquistador Gonzalo de Sandoval founds the city of Colima.
- July 29 – The Republic of Venice and the Holy Roman Empire conclude the Treaty of Worms to remove Venice from the Italian War that has gone for two years.
- c. July – Martin Luther's translation of the Pentateuch into German (Das allte Testament Deutsch) is published by Melchior Lotter Jr. in Wittenberg.
- August 22 – Lucien Grimaldi, Lord of Monaco, is assassinated by his nephew at the Prince's Palace. Bartolomeo Doria di Dolceaqua, the son of Lucien's sister Francesca, kills his uncle and then has his men drag the monarch's body down the palace stairs in front of a horrified crowd, who drive the Doria family out of the small principality. Lucien had become the ruler in 1505 after stabbing to death his brother, Jean II. Lucien's heir is his 8-month-old son, Honoré; Lucien's brother Augustine Grimaldi becomes the regent during Honoré's minority.
- September 14 – Pope Adrian VI, the last Dutch person to serve as head of the Roman Catholic Church, dies at age 64 after a reign of 21 months. For the next 455 years, all Popes elected will be Italian-born until the election of Karol Wojtyla of Poland in 1978 as Pope John Paul II.
- September 22 – Spanish conquest of Nicaragua: An agreement is made for an expedition by conquistadores into Nicaragua organized by Pedrarias Dávila.
- September 23 – After receiving word from Malaya that Portuguese forces were attacking the Sultanate of Patani and the Malacca Sultanate on the Malaysian peninsula, the Chinese Emperor Zhengde orders extermination of all persons from Portugal, 23 envoys from Portugal are executed and mutilated.

=== October–December ===
- October 1 – A conclave of 32 cardinals begins deliberations in Rome to elect a successor to the late Pope Adrian VI. Three other cardinals arrive on October 6 and balloting begins for a new Pope. Niccolò Fieschi and Bernardino López de Carvajal y Sande fail to receive the necessary majority in initial balloting, and Gianmaria del Monte comes within one vote (26 votes) of being elected. Voting continues for seven weeks before Cardinal Giulio de Medici wins 27 votes.
- October 27 – Hürrem Pasha, the Ottoman Empire's Governor-General of the Damascus Eyalet (which includes parts of what will become Syria, Israel, Jordan and Palestine) begins a punitive expedition through Lebanon against the Druze of Chouf. During the first campaign, Hürrem's troops burn 43 villages and kill at least 400 Druze.
- November 19 – Following the September 14 death of Pope Adrian VI, Cardinal Giulio de' Medici is elected 219th pope as Clement VII. The election of Cardinal Medici begins an unbroken reign of 44 consecutive Italian Popes over the next 455 years.
- November 26 – At Santa Maria in Via Lata, Cardinal Marco Cornaro carries out the coronation of Pope Clement at the church of Santa Maria in Via Lata in Rome.
- December 6 – Setting off from the Mexican Aztec capital of Tenochtitlan with an army of 550 Spanish soldiers and 120 horses, Pedro de Alvarado y Contreras begins the Spanish conquest of Guatemala.

=== Date unknown ===
- The Ming dynasty Chinese navy captures two Western ships with Portuguese breech–loading culverins aboard, which the Chinese call a fo–lang–ji (Frankish culverin). According to the Ming Shi, these cannons are soon presented to the Jiajing Emperor by Wang Hong, and their design is copied in 1529.
- In northern Italy, a French army under Guillaume Gouffier tries to recover Milan but fails due to an offensive by Spanish, Imperial and English troops and they retreat in mid-November.

== Births ==
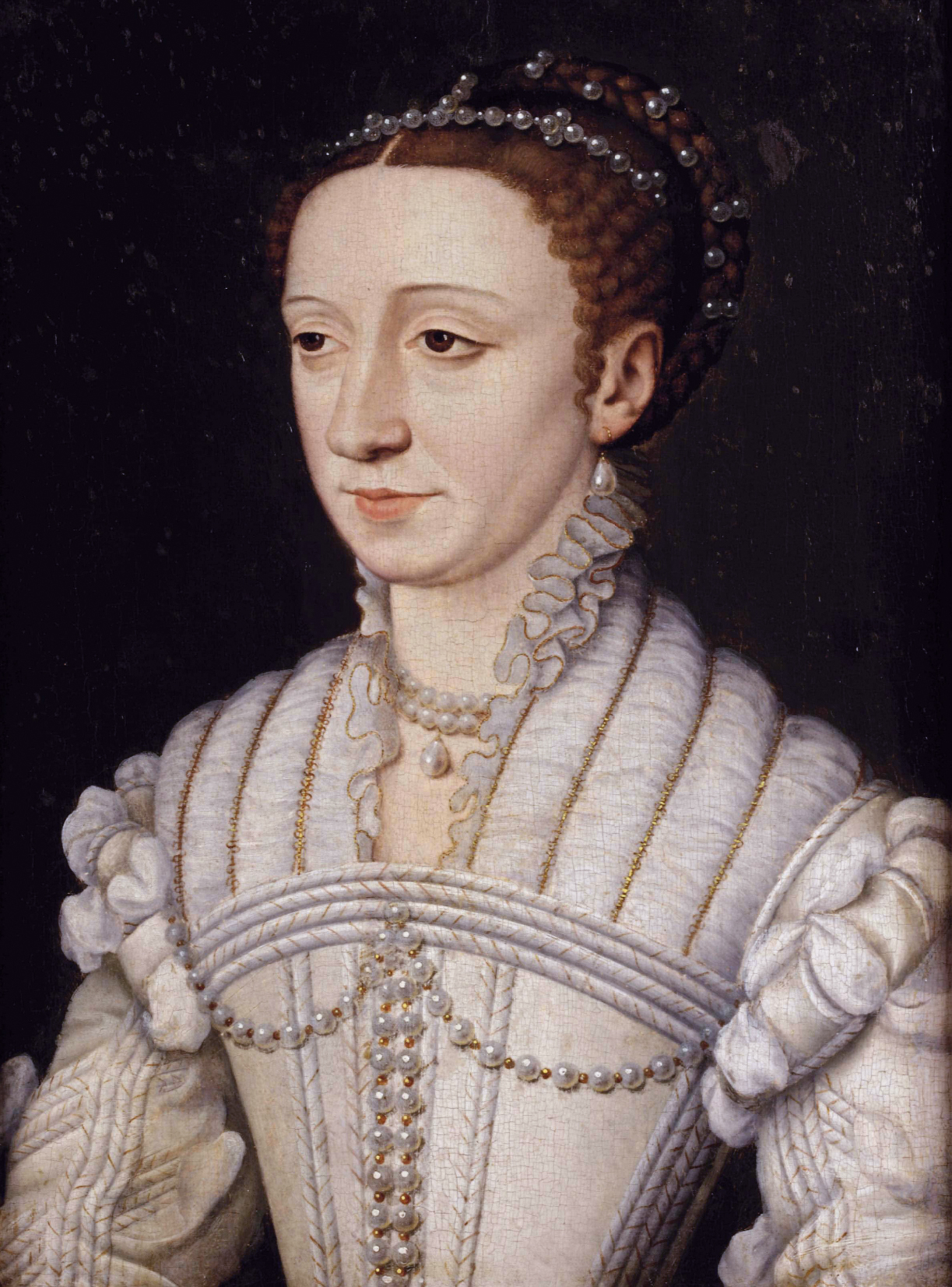
Margaret of France, Duchess of Berry

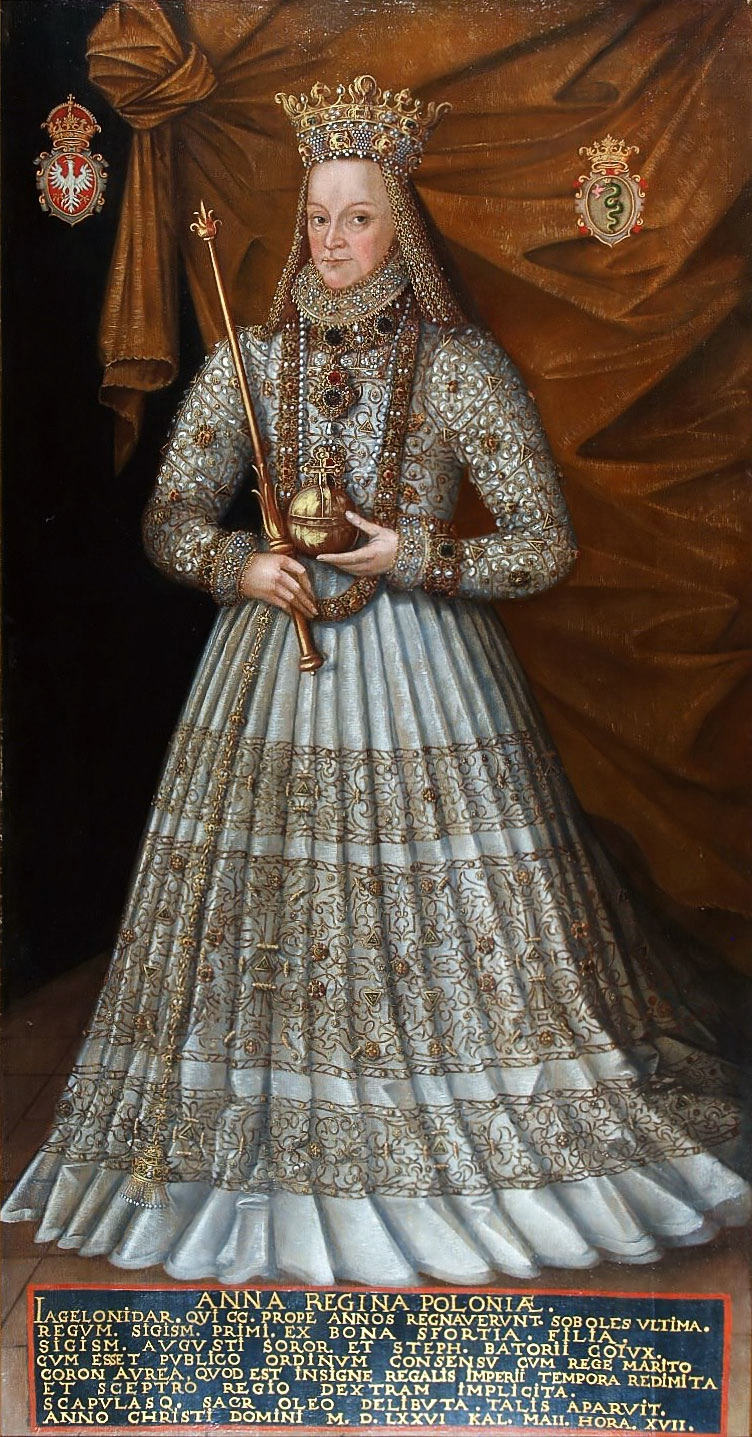
Queen Anna

- January 29 – Enea Vico, Italian engraver (d. 1567)
- February 1 – Francesco Abbondio Castiglioni, Italian Catholic cardinal (d. 1568)
- February 13 – Valentin Naboth, German astronomer and mathematician (d. 1593)
- February 20 – Jan Blahoslav, Czech writer (d. 1571)
- March 14 – Helena Magenbuch, German pharmacist (d. 1597)
- March 17 – Giovanni Francesco Commendone, Italian Catholic cardinal (d. 1584)
- March 21 – Kaspar Eberhard, German theologian (d. 1575)
- April 5 – Blaise de Vigenère, French diplomat and cryptographer (d. 1596)
- April 21 – Marco Antonio Bragadin, Venetian lawyer and military officer (d. 1571)
- June 5 – Margaret of France, Duchess of Berry (d. 1574)
- July 4 – Pier Francesco Orsini, Italian condottiero and art patron (d. 1583)
- July 18 – Duke George II of Brieg (1547–1586) (d. 1586)
- September 21 – Sancho d'Avila, Spanish general (d. 1583)
- September 22 – Charles, Cardinal de Bourbon, French church leader and pretender to the throne (d. 1590)
- October 10 – Ludwig Rabus, German martyrologist (d. 1592)
- October 11 – Eleonore of Fürstenberg, wife of Philip IV, Count of Hanau-Lichtenberg (d. 1544)
- October 18 – Anna Jagiellon, daughter of Sigismund I of Poland (d. 1596)
- date unknown
  - Gabriele Falloppio, Italian anatomist and physician (d. 1562)
  - Gaspara Stampa, Italian poet (d. 1554)
- probable
  - Crispin van den Broeck, Flemish painter (d. 1591)
  - Francisco Foreiro, Portuguese Dominican theologian and biblist (b. in 1522 or 1523; d. 1581)
- possible – Catherine Howard, fifth queen of Henry VIII of England, (b. between 1518 and 1524; executed 1542)

== Deaths ==
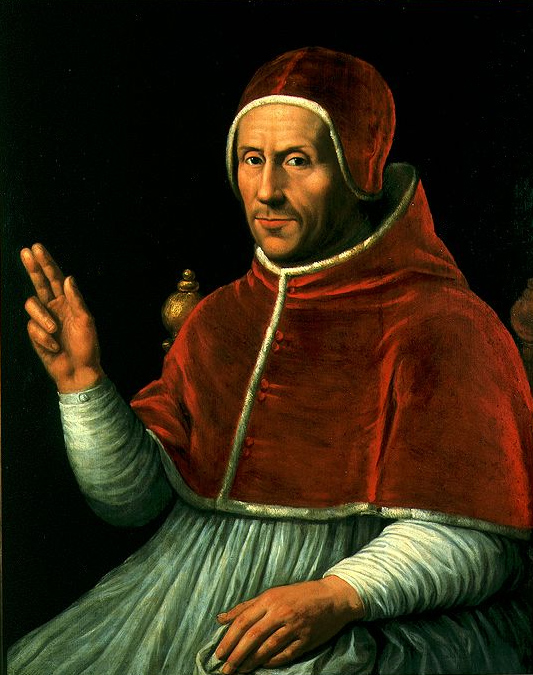
Pope Adrian VI

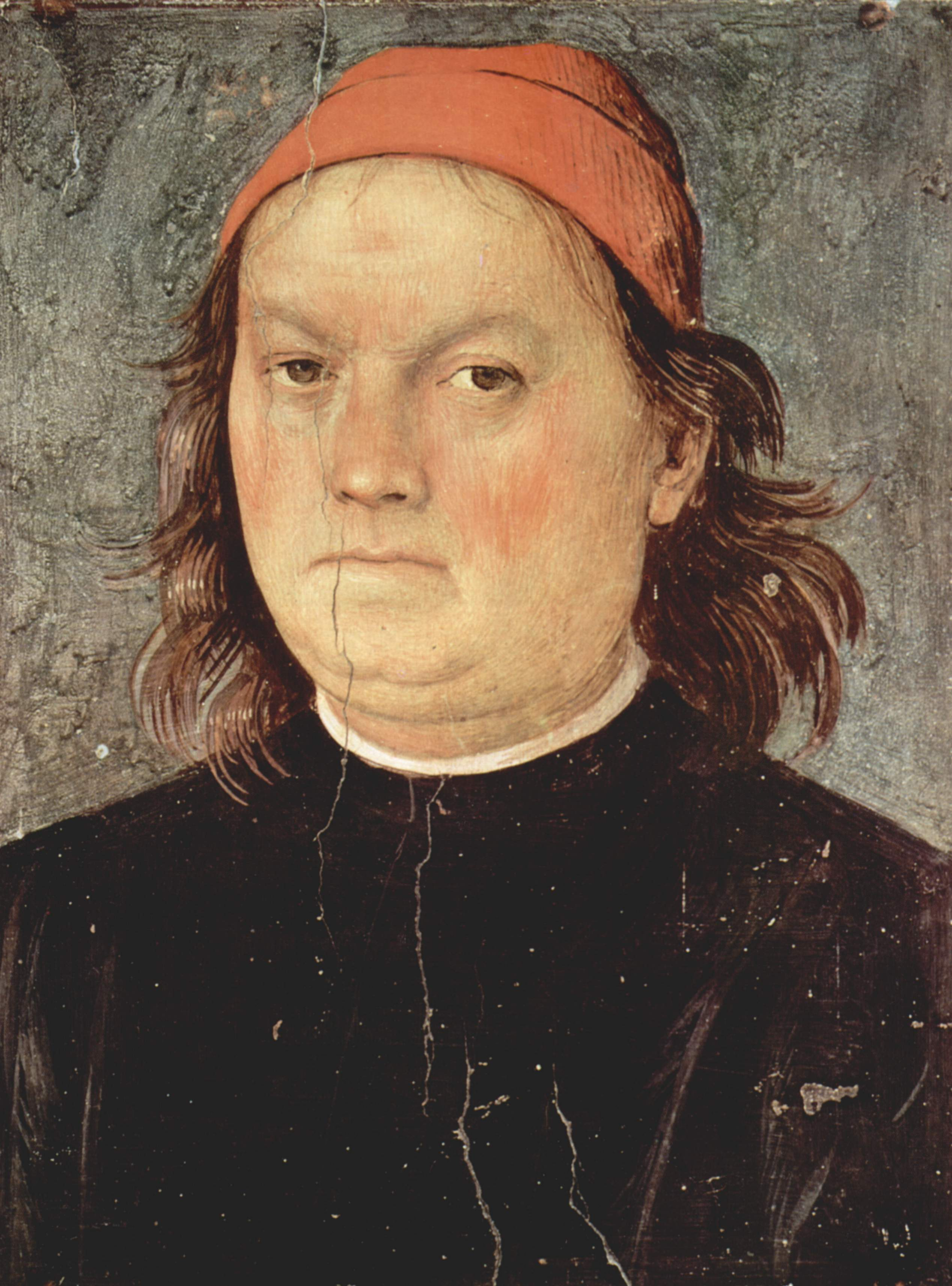
Pietro Perugino

- January 17 – Elisabeth of Hesse-Marburg, German landgravine (b. 1466)
- February 4 – Thomas Ruthall, English chancellor of the University of Cambridge
- March 28 – Louis I, Count of Löwenstein, founder of the House of Löwenstein-Wertheim (b. 1463)
- April 6 – Henry Stafford, 1st Earl of Wiltshire, English nobleman (b. 1479)
- May 7
  - Antonio Grimani, Italian admiral and Doge of Venice (b. 1434)
  - Franz von Sickingen, German knight (b. 1481)
- May 23 – Ashikaga Yoshitane, Japanese shōgun (b. 1466)
- May 24 – Henry Marney, 1st Baron Marney, English politician (b. 1447)
- July 1 – Jan van Essen and Hendrik Vos, Flemish Lutheran martyrs
- July 7 – Wijerd Jelckama, Frisian rebel and warlord (b. 1490)
- August 13 – Gerard David, Flemish artist (b. c. 1455)
- August 27 – Domenico Grimani, Italian nobleman (b. 1461)
- August 29 – Ulrich von Hutten, Lutheran reformer (b. 1488)
- September 14 – Pope Adrian VI (b. 1459)
- October 2 – Alessandro Alessandri, Italian jurist (b. 1461)
- October 5 – Bogislaw X, Duke of Pomerania (1474–1523) (b. 1454)
- October 11 – Bartolomeo Montagna, Italian painter (b. 1450)
- October – William Cornysh, English composer (b. 1465)
- November 10 – Lachlan Cattanach Maclean, 11th Chief, Scottish clan chief (b. 1465)
- date unknown – Pietro Perugino, Italian painter (b. 1446)
