= Treaty of Tordesillas (1524) =

1524 treaty that created an alliance between Monaco and the Holy Roman Emperor Charles V

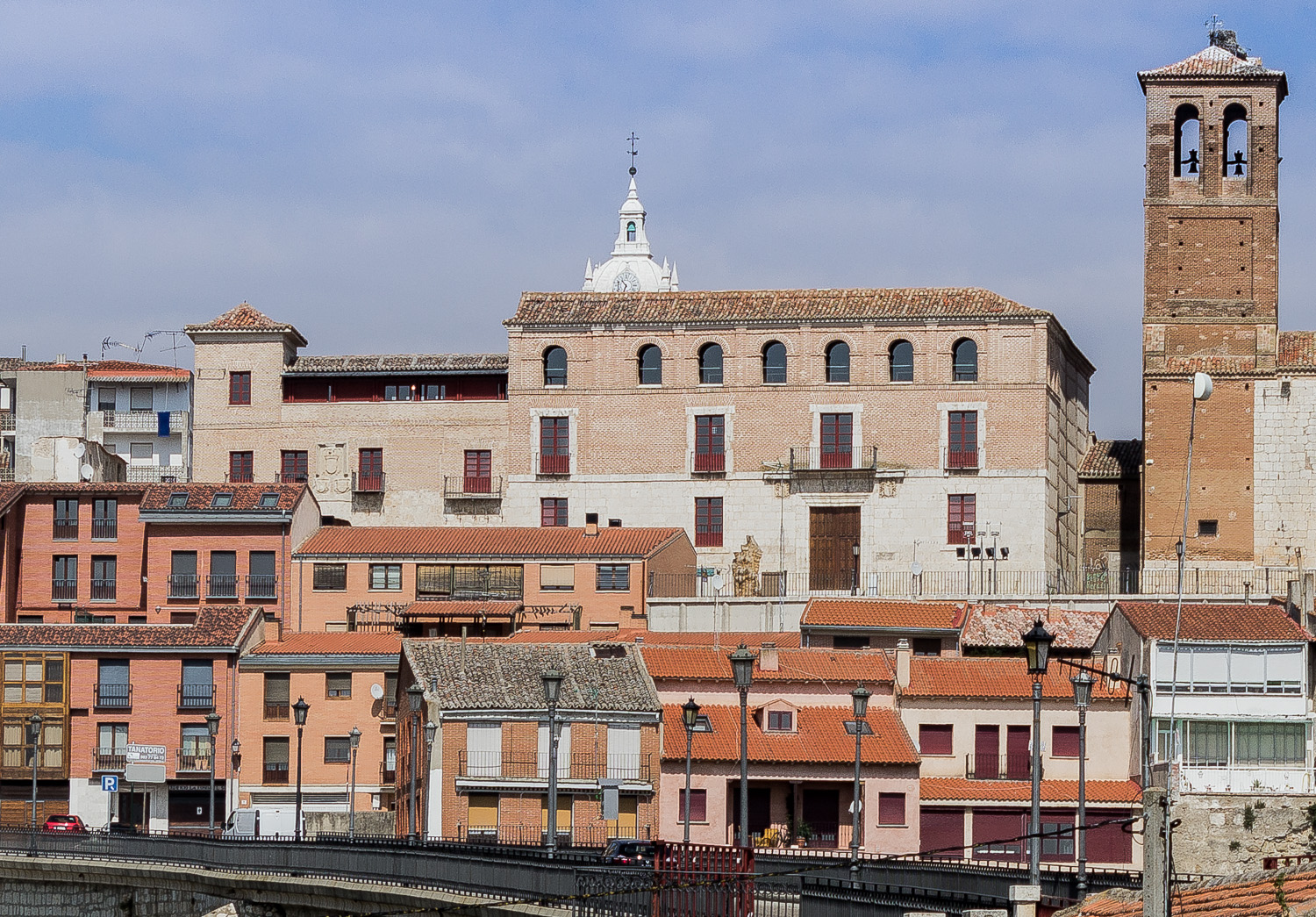
- Signed: 15 November 1524
- Location: Tordesillas, Kingdom of Spain
- Signatories: Charles V; Augustine Grimaldi
- Parties: Holy Roman Empire and Kingdom of Spain; Principality of Monaco

The Treaty of Tordesillas, signed on 15 November 1524, ratified the treaty of Burgos, signed on 7 June 1524 between the Lord of Monaco and the House of Habsburg. The treaty placed Monaco under the protection of Charles V, Holy Roman Emperor and King of Spain, as an imperial fief. As a consequence, the Lord of Monaco became subservient to Charles as his vassal, marking the beginning of an Imperial and Spanish protectorate over Monaco.

Thus, the Lord of Monaco was required to give feudal homage, but Lucien I of Monaco requested that requirement be removed from the treaty and obtained for the final proclamation of November 1524 to recognize the autonomy of Monaco.

== Background ==
On 22 August 1523 the ruling Prince of Monaco, Lucien Grimaldi, was assassinated by his cousin Barthélémy Doria, who stabbed him forty-two times. The population of Monaco intervened in favour of the Grimaldi dynasty and refused this coup. Barthélémy Doria who tried to escape his crime was caught and detained in the vicinity of La Turbie before being released by the House of Savoy. Meanwhile, Augustine Grimaldi, younger brother of Lucien and then bishop of Grasse, rose to the throne of Monaco as a regent in favour of his nephew Honoré by dispositions of his mother Claudine Grimaldi.

Fearing for the sovereignty of his Principality, Augustine Grimaldi obtained from Pope Clement VII a papal bull promulgated on 19 February 1524, which consecrated the autonomy of Monaco.

However, despite the support of French King François I, Augustine Grimaldi was blocked by the superseding influence of Andrea Doria at the Court of France, impeding him from prosecuting Barthélémy Doria for his crime. In order to obtain justice, Augustine Grimaldi obtained the vassalty of Genovese territories under the influence of Andrea Doria, and on 3 November 1523 the citizens of Dolceaqua came to pledge allegiance to the Grimaldi.

Following the defeat of Guillaume Gouffier, seigneur de Bonnivet, at the battle of Gattinara in 1524, François I was losing influence in the area while Andra Doria's gallera plundered the Monegasque coast and Augustine Grimaldi was almost killed by the bombardments of these galleras in Menton.

These events "forced" Augustine to pick up on the negotiations that his brother Lucien Grimaldi had begun with the lieutenants of Charles V. Augustine Grimaldi offered the port of Monaco to be used as a military basis for the troops of the Charles III, constable of Bourbon, the last of the great feudal lord to oppose the king of France.

== Treaty of Burgos ==
In June 1524, Leonard Grimaldi was sent as by Augustine Grimaldi as his procurator to Spain to negotiate with the imperial chancery.

A treaty was signed in Burgos on 7 June, which stipulated not only the imperial protection granted to Monaco but its first article stipulated that the Lord of Monaco and his heirs should pay tribute to the Emperor thus transforming a mere protection into a vassalty as form of protectorate. Despite his fragile position in the negotiation, Augustine Grimaldi firmly protested this disposition. Augustine could count on the support of the constable of Bourbon, whom he helped continuously as the imperial forces retreated from Provence and heroically resisted in the port of Marseille.

On 15 November 1524 the treaty of Burgos was ratified in Tordesillas which included the protection of Augustine Grimaldi and explicitly mentioned that Monaco was absolutely independent from any superior powers, with any contrary disposition being void. The Holy Roman Emperor and King of Spain considered the Lord of Monaco as his "friend".

Through this alliance, a pension was given to Monaco in times of war and a garrison would be recruited and paid for by the Emperor to protect it as a visible sign of the "imperial immediacy" on Monaco. Indemnities would be given for any goods seized by the Kingdom of France in retaliation. Finally, the constable of Bourbon would oversee the transfer of properties from Barthélémy Doria to the House of Grimaldi. Various privileges were obtained for the Lord of Monaco to obtain ecclesiastical benefits from Sardinia and Sicily.

On 10 April 1525 Augustine Grimaldi ratified, by way of sealed letters patent, an act which, for the next 118 years, would place Monaco in the orbit of Habsburg politics.

== Aftermath ==
=== Battle of Pavia ===
Through the strategic position of Monaco, the troops of the Empire were able to secure a strong connection between Spain and the Milanese troops, which was an element in the decisive victory of the Imperials and Spanish at the Battle of Pavia in February 1525. Charles V expressed his gratitude to Augustine Grimaldi for his support.

=== Death of Barthélémy Doria ===
After finally capturing Barthélémy Doria, Augustine Grimaldi had him judged in Monaco, and assigned to the capital punishment. However, Pope Clement VII opposed this sentence and Barthélémy was release. Later, when, during the night, he attacked the castle of La Penna owned by Augustine Grimaldi, Barthélémy Doria perished as he fell to the ground in an attempt to escalate up the cliff that led to the fortress.

=== Treaty of Madrid (1526) ===
As a result of the Treaty of Tordesillas, Monaco was included in the Treaty of Madrid signed in 1526 between France and the Habsburgs. The intention was to return any properties confiscated by the Kingdom of France to the Lord of Monaco. However, these provisions were never duly implemented.

On the way to his crowning in Bologna, Emperor Charles V made a four-day stop in Monaco from 5 to 9 August 1529, manifesting his benevolence.

However, despite the appearance of support of the Emperor, who even suggested that Augustine Grimaldi should be raised to the cardinalate, it seems that the appearances were delusive, as little was done for Monaco. Meanwhile, Andrea Doria had changed sides and become a close ally of the Emperor too. Augustine Grimaldi sought to balance his alliance and secretly dealt with the Kingdom of France, before dying, in mysterious circumstances, in 1532.

In December 1523, Francisco de Valenzuela was accredited as imperial resident in Monaco before being chased to Genoa by regent Etienne Grimaldi in May 1534, in an attempt to curtail the Imperial and Spanish influence on Monaco. Thus, Etienne would later refuse another visit of the Emperor while welcoming Pope Paul III for a visit to Monaco in May 1538.

Monaco was once again included in the Treaty of Crépy in 1544.

== Bibliography ==
- The Microstates of Europe
- History of Monaco retrieved 9 February 2007
