= Deuchler =

Deuchler is a surname. Notable people with the surname include:

- Martina Deuchler (born 1935), Swiss academic and author
- Suzanne Deuchler (1929–2022), American politician

== See also ==
- Deschler
