= Jean-André Grimaldi =

Bishop of Grasse (died 1505)

Jean-André Grimaldi (5 July 1483 – 1 July 1505) was Bishop of Grasse from 1483 to 1505. Prior to that, he was a professor of theology at the University of Pavia before serving as ambassador in the court of Pope Sixtus IV, first in Denmark, then in France. Services rendered on behalf of Pope Sixtus IV included the delivering of holy relics to the dying Louis XI; the next Pope, Innocent VIII, appointed Grimaldi as advisor to the young and troubled Charles VIII, King of France. As Bishop of Grasse, he was succeeded by his nephew, Augustine Grimaldi, a son of Lamberto, Lord of Monaco.
