= Claudine of Monaco =

Lady regnant of Monaco from 1457 to 1458/1515

Claudine Grimaldi
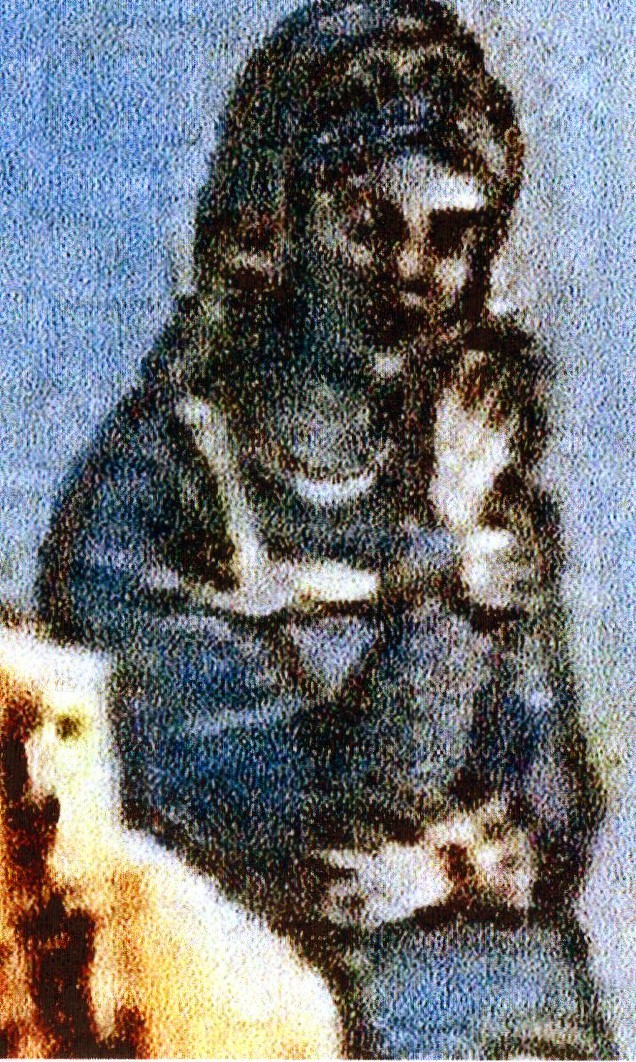

Lady regnant of Monaco
- Reign: 1457 – 1458 (de facto) or 1515 (de jure)
- Predecessor: Catalan
- Successor: Lamberto (de facto) or Lucien (de jure)
- Co-rulers: Lambert (1458–1494); Jean II (1494–1505); Lucien (since 1505)
- Born: c. 1451
- Died: 19 November 1515
- Spouse: Lambert of Monaco (m. 1465; died 1494)
- Issue: Jean II, Lord of Monaco; Louis Grimaldi; Bianca Grimaldi; Augustino, Bishop of Grasse; Françoise Grimaldi; Lucien, Lord of Monaco
- House: Grimaldi
- Father: Catalan Grimaldi
- Mother: Blanche del Carretto

Claudine or Claudia (c. 1451 – 19 November 1515) was Lady regnant of Monaco from 1457 to de facto 1458 or de jure 1515. By virtue of the cession of her rights, Lambert, Jean II, and Lucien became the lords of Monaco in succession.

== Life ==
Claudine was the daughter of Blanche del Carretto and Catalan Grimaldi. She was the only child of her father, and thereby his heir.

The succession of Monaco was regulated by her paternal grandfather Jean I, who allowed for female succession provided that a female heir kept her own name Grimaldi after marriage and passed it on to her children, and that her husband should take the name and arms of his wife. Claudine's position as heir to the throne of Monaco was further secured by her father.

In his will, he stated that he was to be succeeded by his daughter Claudine who (to adjust to the will of his father that a female ruler was not to result in a change in dynasty), was to marry her seventh cousin Lamberto Grimaldi di Antibes, to ensure that the Grimaldi family should keep the throne of Monaco and avoid a change in dynasty. He further appointed his mother Pomellina Fregoso regent of Monaco until his daughter's majority and, in the event of Pomellina's death, that his brother-in-law Pierre Fregoso should succeed her as Claudine's regent until her majority.

=== Sole reign ===
In July 1457, Catalan died when Claudine was at the age of six, and her paternal grandmother Pomellina Fregoso duly became regent of Monaco in accordance with the written will of her son. However, Claudine's fiancé Lambert opposed the will and demanded part of the regency, and his demand was supported by the population. On 20 October therefore, Pomellina saw herself forced to sign a statement in which she was to share the power of regency with Lambert. Pomellina then prepared to have Lambert ousted and killed in a coup in collaboration with Pierre Fregoso and Pierre Grimaldi, Lord of Beuil, the latter of whom she promised to make the father-in-law of Claudine.

In March 1458, the plot was staged, but Lambert managed to escape: with the support of the population of Menton and Roquebrune, he deposed Pomellina's regency government, confined her to her house in Menton, and had himself recognized as lord, personally and as the possessor of the rights of Claudine.

=== Co-reign with Lambert ===
Lambert regarded himself Lord of Monaco, not merely as the designated husband of Claudine, but by having conquered the rulership from Pomelline. The dynastic marriage between Claudine and Lambert was regardless to take place, but was postponed because of the young age of the bride.

On 16 March 1458, Lambert received the oath of allegiance from the people of Monaco and was recognized as co-lord of Monaco. Lambert governed whilst Claudine reigned. On January 1460, a plot staged by Pomellina, Pierre de Beuil and the count de Tende resulted in an attack on Monaco and Lambert's rule, which failed.

The marriage between Claudine and Lambert took place on 29 August 1465 in Vintimille. The marriage between Claudine and Lambert has traditionally been described as a happy one. In 1483, Lambert found himself as Lord of Monaco by obtaining a proper donation from Claudine of her rights, on the condition that he dispose of them only in favor of the children born of their marriage. France recognized the sovereignty of the Lordship of Monaco in 1489. Lambert did include Claudine's name when he proclaimed his sovereignty over the rebellious province of Mentone, which was not completely subdued until 1491.

=== Later life ===
Upon Lambert's death in 1494, their son Jean became Lord of Monaco as Jean II. Jean II directed the affairs of the state under the auspices of his mother Claudine. Claudine outlived Jean, who was murdered in 1505 by his brother Lucien, the subsequent lord. According to tradition, Claudine was present during the murder of her son by her other son. She is said to have mourned Jean openly after his death, thereby demonstrating her opinion about his murder to his murderer and successor, her own son Lucien. Although her devotion to her son Jean was well-understood, particularly when she insisted on being buried beside him, she was also devoted to Lucien, whose claim of self-defense she believed. During Lucien's rule, his mother Claudine was the nominal ruler.

Although Claudine had ceded her rights to her husband, she exercised the right to determine the order of succession. After her 58-year reign, Claudine died in 1515. In her will, she stated that her rights to the three provinces of the Lordship of Monaco were to be passed on to her children in accordance with the succession order stated in the will of her father and grandfather, securing female succession on condition that it did not result to a change in dynasty. She also reinstated her granddaughter Marie Grimaldi (daughter of Jean II) in the succession, despite Lucien having forced her to renounce her claims upon her marriage. Upon the death of Lucien in 1532, Augustine became Lord for life under his mother Claudine's will.

== Issue ==
Claudine had at least nine children, or as much as 14:

- Jean II (1468 – 11 October 1505), married Antonia of Savoy and had one daughter, Marie Grimaldi, who was forced to renounce her right to the throne.
- Philbert (1471 – 1487), died aged 16.
- Francesca (1473 – 1523), married Luc Doria. Her son Bartholomew Doria murdered her brother Lucien.
- Césarine (1475), married in 1503 to Charles di Ceve, Marquis de Ceva, Seigneur de Garessio.
- Louis (1478 – 1505), deemed insane and barred from the inheritance.
- Blanche Grimaldi (1480 – 8 May 1540), married in 1501 to Honoré (Baron de Tourette) de Villeneuve d'Espinouse, and had three sons and two daughters; co-regent for Lucien's son Honoré I, Lord of Monaco with Nicolas Grimaldi in 1532.
- Augustino, Bishop of Grasse (1482 – 14 April 1532)
- Lucien (1487 – 22 August 1523), married Jeanne de Pontevès-Cabanes and have five children, three of whom died young.
- Isabeau (1490 – 1550), married Antoine (Comte de Saint-Remèze) de Châteauneuf-Randon, and had one son and three daughters.

Claudine of Monaco House of Grimaldi
Regnal titles
| Preceded by Catalan | Lady Regnant of Monaco; 1457–1458/1515 with Lambert (1458–1494); Jean II (1494–1505); Lucien (1505–1515) | Succeeded by Lambert or Lucien |
