= Lamberto, Lord of Monaco =

Lord of Monaco from 1458 to 1494

Lamberto Grimaldi

Lord of Monaco
- Reign: 1458 – 1494
- Predecessor: Claudine (as sole ruler)
- Successor: Jean II
- Co-ruler: Claudine
- Born: c. 1420
- Died: 15 March 1494
- Spouse: Claudine Grimaldi
- House: Grimaldi
- Father: Nicolas Grimaldi di Antibes
- Mother: Cesarina Doria d’Oneglia

Lamberto Grimaldi (c. 1420 – March 1494) was Lord of Monaco from 16 March 1458.

== Life ==
Lamberto was of the branch of the Grimaldi family which had settled in Antibes while Claudine was of the more powerful Monaco branch. Grimaldi had one brother, Jean-André, in the church and another brother, Louis, in the military. Grimaldi found much help and support as a ruler from his brothers and, following his feud with the faction headed by Claudine's grandmother, Pomellina Fregoso, Lambert secured his title and an "oath of fidelity" from the population of Monaco.

By virtue of the cession of Claudine's rights, Lambert became Lord of Monaco. On 16 March 1458, Lambert received the oath of allegiance from the people of Monaco and was recognized as co-lord of Monaco. Lambert governed whilst Claudine reigned.

He was married to his seventh cousin Claudine Grimaldi in 1465, per the wishes and legal Will and testament of her late brother, Catalan, and their father. His marriage to Claudine ensured the continuity of Monaco's rule by a Grimaldi. Claudine was nominally her brother's successor, but all power as Seigneur of Monaco was in her husband's hands and their marriage legitimized the succession for their descendants. The succession was legally secured to the children of Lamberto and Claudine, in order of birth, on August 14, 1483. This new succession act was actually just a confirmation of the decrees drawn up by Claudine's father and brother. If only female offspring would survive, then it was decreed that such female offspring must marry a Grimaldi in order to inherit the throne.

Lamberto assumed the reins of power in Monaco at a difficult time in its often vulnerable history. Lamberto fought to preserve Monaco's independence, and is said to have "handled diplomacy and the sword with equal talent". He also established the Grimaldi motto "With God's help." He was religious and studious, according to Bernardy, and had "studied hard" at the University of Pavia. France recognized the sovereignty of the Lordship of Monaco in 1489.

== Issue ==
He and Claudine had at least six children:

- Jean (1468 – 11 October 1505)
- Louis (deemed insane and barred from the inheritance)
- Bianca
- Augustino, Bishop of Grasse (1482 – 14 April 1532)
- Françoise (died before 1523); married Luc Doria, her son Bartholomew Doria murdered her brother Lucien
- Lucien (1487 – 22 August 1523)

Lamberto, Lord of Monaco House of Grimaldi Born: c. 1420 Died: 15 March 1494
Regnal titles
Preceded by Claudine as sole ruler	Lord of Monaco; 1458–1494; With: Claudine	Succeeded by Jean II
