= Napoleon Museum (Monaco) =

Museum in Monaco

Coordinates: 43.73126°N 7.42013°E

- Established: 1970
- Location: Monte Carlo, Monaco

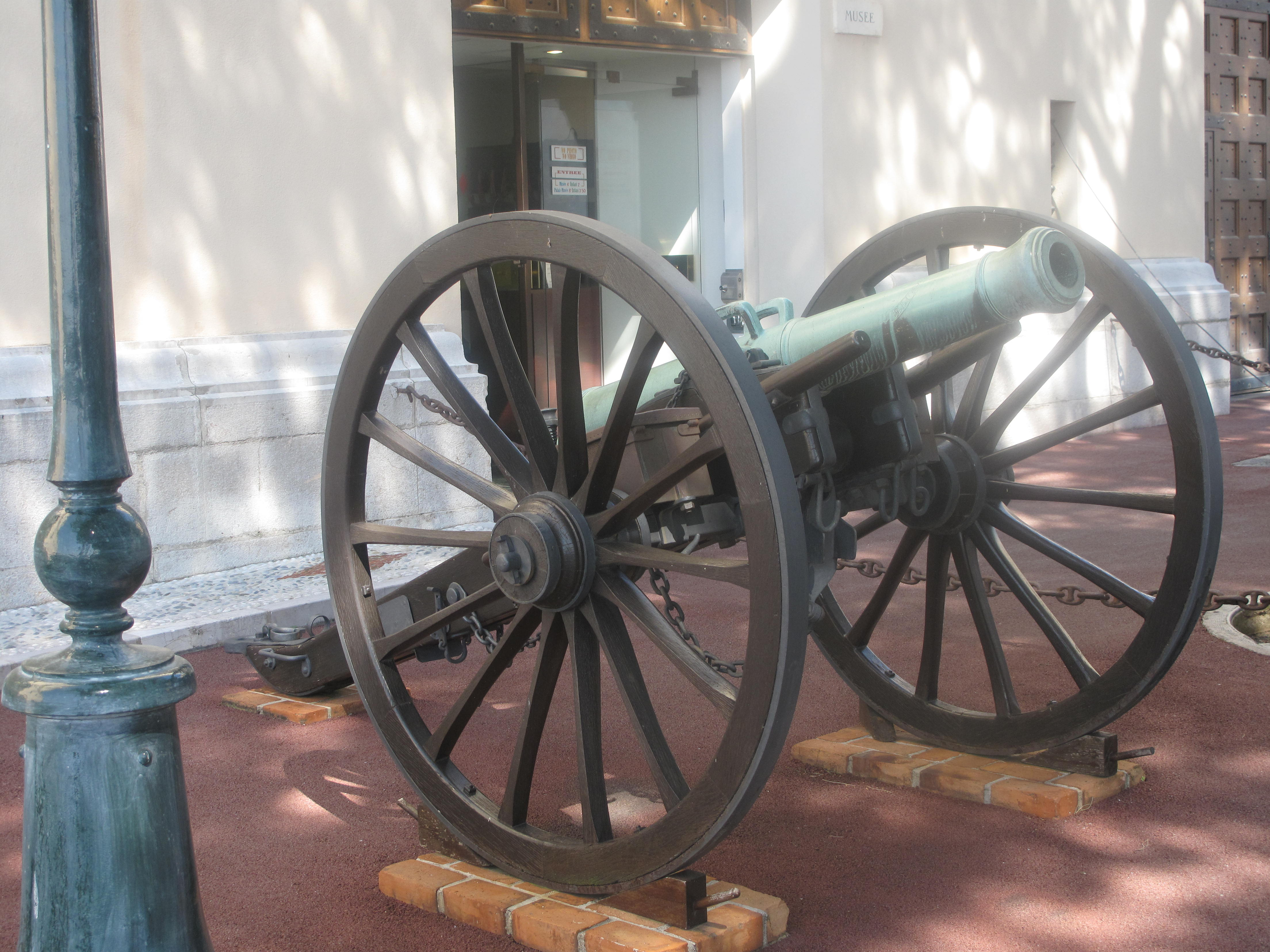
Cannon at the entrance of the museum.

The Napoleon Museum in Monte Carlo, Monaco was a museum of artifacts that once belonged to the French Emperor Napoleon I. The museum, first established in 1968, was located in the Prince of Monaco's palace. In 2014, the museum's collection was auctioned off to raise funding for renovations to the Prince's palace.

== History and exhibits ==
The museum, which was located in the Prince of Monaco's palace, contained a collection of nearly 1,000 pieces of Napoleonic memorabilia that were largely gathered by Prince Louis II, the great-grandfather of the present Prince of Monaco. The collection contained numerous possessions of the Emperor, including letters and documents pertaining to his reign and conquest of Europe and relics from his exile and imprisonment on Saint Helena. Also included in the collection was clothing that belonged to Napoleon's son, Napoleon II.

The museum also displayed items of historical importance that were related to the Principality of Monaco. Among these was the Charter of Independence of Monaco that was given royal assent by King Louis XII of France.

The museum was established in 1968 by Prince Rainier III.

The collection of Napoleonic effects was sold at auction in 2014 to raise funds for renovations to the Prince's Palace. A bicorne hat worn by Napoleon sold for 1.9 million euros at the auction. Additionally, a painting by Paul Delaroche sold for 460,000 euros, and a larger bust of the emperor sold for 700,000 euros.
