= Blanche del Carretto =

Lady of Monaco

- Born: Blanche del Carretto
- Catalan, Lord of Monaco
- Issue: Claudine, Lady of Monaco
- House: Del Carretto
- Father: Galeotto I del Carretto, Margrave of Finale
- Mother: Vannina Adorno

Blanche del Carretto (1432 – 1458) was Lady of Monaco by marriage to Catalan, Lord of Monaco. She has also been called Marguerite del Carretto.

== Biography ==
She was the daughter of Galeotto I del Carretto, Margrave of Finale. Blanche and Catalan had only one child. Her husband designated their daughter Claudine as ruler of Monaco upon his death. When he died in 1457, he was succeeded by their daughter Claudine, then only a child, but the regency government was assigned to Blanche's mother-in-law Pomellina Fregoso rather than to Blanche. Pomellina was deposed by Claudine's cousin Lambert in 1458, who assumed the Lordship of Monaco himself. Blanche died the same year of the accession of Lambert.

Issue

1. Claudine, Lady of Monaco (1451-1515)

Blanche del Carretto Born: 1432 Died: 1458
Preceded by Pomellina Fregoso	Lady Consort of Monaco; 1454–1457	Succeeded by Antonia of Savoy
