= Pomellina Fregoso =

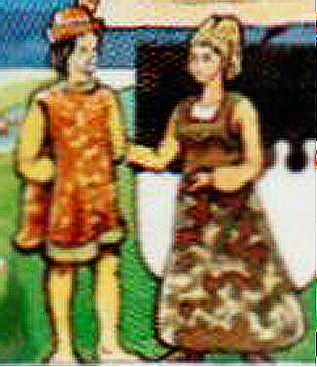
- Pomellina and her husband, Jean.
- Born: Pomellina Fregoso; 1387/88; Genoa
- Died: 1468; Monaco
- Burial: Cathedral of Our Lady Immaculate
- Giovanni Grimaldi, Lord of Monaco
- Issue: Costanza; Catalan, Lord of Monaco; Bartholomeo
- Father: Pietro Fregoso, Doge of Genoa

Pomellina Fregoso (1387/88 in Genoa – 1468 in Monaco) was Lady Consort of Monaco by marriage to Jean I, Lord of Monaco, and the mother of Lord Catalan. She served as regent of Monaco several times during the absence of her husband between 1437 and 1441, as well as between 1457 and March 1458, as the guardian of her granddaughter Claudine, Lady of Monaco. She was thus the first woman to rule Monaco.

== Life ==
Pomellina (or Pomelline) was a member of the noble House of Fregoso of Genoa, which included several doges of Genoa among its members. Her father was the Doge Pietro Fregoso (died 1404), and her mother was either Theodora Spinola or Benedetta Doria.

=== Lady of Monaco ===
In 1419, after Monaco had been occupied by Genoa since 1357, her husband became Lord of Monaco in co-regency with his brothers, but ruled alone from 1427 onward. Monaco itself was occupied by the Duchy of Milan in 1436, but freed, upon which Jean placed Pomellina there to manage the fortress in his absence. She was the first Monegasque consort to play an important role. Jean I was often absent from Monaco, and left Pomellina as a de facto regent.

Between 1437 and 1441, she was regent of Monaco during the frequent absence of her spouse in warfare in Italy. During this period, Jean I was held prisoner by Filippo Maria Visconti, who threatened to kill him if Monégasque power was not turned over to him. In 1438, Visconti turned Jean over to Louis, Duke of Savoy, and consented to the annexation of Monaco to Savoy. Jean refused his consent to turn over Monaco to Savoy, and sent a message to Pomelina to hold Monaco against Savoy at any cost. Monaco was subjected to an unsuccessful siege by Louis, Duke of Savoy from 1439 to 1440, during which Pomellina was in charge of the fortress of Monaco, and successfully resisted the siege. She managed to preserve the independence of Monaco and still secure the release of her husband.

Jean I was finally released in 1441 and allowed to return to Monaco. He continued to be frequently absent from Monaco, in service of Milan and Naples.

=== Regency ===
Jean I died on 8 May 1454, making Pomellina a widow. Prior to his death, Jean I regulated the succession of Monaco, and allowed for female succession provided that a female heir kept her own name Grimaldi after marriage and passed it on to her children, and that her husband should take the name and arms of his wife. He was succeeded by their son Lord Catalan. Catalan was reportedly influenced by his mother and his brother-in-law Pierre Fregoso, who came from his mother's family.

Catalan had no male heir. In his will, he stated that he was to be succeeded by his daughter Claudine who (to adjust to the will of his father that a female ruler was not to result in a change in dynasty), was to marry her cousin Lamberto, Lord of Monaco. He further appointed his mother Pomellina Fregoso regent of Monaco until his daughter's majority and, in the event of Pomellina's death, that Pierre Fregoso should succeed her as Claudine's regent until her majority.

In July 1457, Catalan died when Claudine was at the age of six, and Pomellina Fregoso duly became regent of Monaco in accordance with the written will of her son. However, Claudine's fiancé Lambert opposed the will and demanded part of the regency, and his demand was supported by the population. On 20 October therefore, Pomellina saw herself forced to sign a statement in which she was to share the power of regency with Lambert. Pomellina then prepared to have Lambert ousted and killed in a coup in collaboration with Pierre Fregoso and Pierre Grimaldi, Lord of Beuil, the latter of whom she promised to make the father-in-law of Claudine.

In March 1458, the plot was staged, but Lambert managed to escape: with the support of the population of Menton and Roquebrune, he deposed Pomellina's regency government, confined her to her house in Menton, and had himself recognized as lord, personally and as the possessor of the rights of Claudine.

=== Later life ===
On January 1460, a plot staged by Pomellina, Pierre de Beuil and the count de Tende resulted in an attack on Monaco and Lambert's rule, which failed.

In 1466, Pomellina Fregoso, who had gathered support among the population of Menton, managed to stage and support a rebellion against Lambert in the provinces of Menton and Roquebrunem who called for support from the governor of Nice. Lambert did not manage to subdue the revolt until 1468, after Pomellina's death.

== Issue ==
She and Giovanni Grimaldi, Lord of Monaco had the following children:

1. Costanza
2. Catalan Grimaldi, Lord of Monaco
3. Bartholomeo

Preceded by Antonia Spinola	Lady Consort of Monaco; 1419–1454	Succeeded by Blanche del Carretto
