= Catalan, Lord of Monaco =

Lord of Monaco from 1454 until 1457

Catalan Grimaldi
- Lord of Monaco
- Born: c. 1415
- Died: 1457 (aged 41–42)
- Noble family: Grimaldi
- Spouse: Blanche del Carretto
- Issue: Claudine, Lady of Monaco
- Father: Jean I, Lord of Monaco
- Mother: Pomellina Fregoso

Catalan Grimaldi (Catalano Grimaldi; c. 1415–1457) was Lord of Monaco from 8 May 1454 until his death in July 1457.

== Biography ==
Catalan became the new ruler of Monaco upon the death of his father, Jean I, on 8 May 1454. Young, he was imprisoned with his father in the Moncalieri Castle by the Duke of Savoy. His father's 1454 testament makes Catalan his universal heir. He was married to Blanche del Carretto and had one daughter, Claudine, Lady of Monaco, and two sons who died at an early age.

During his short reign, Monaco was involved with the Franco-Angevins in reconquering Naples. A 1456 settlement ensured that Monaco would gain its own coastal waters jurisdiction.

Catalan, Lord of Monaco House of Grimaldi Born: c. 1415 Died: 1457
Preceded by Jean I	Lord of Monaco; 1454–1457	Succeeded by Claudine
