= Teschner =

Teschner is a German surname. Notable people with the surname include:

- Mark Teschner, American casting director
- Melchior Teschner (1584–1635), German cantor, composer and theologian
- Peter Teschner, American film editor
- Rudolf Teschner (1922–2006), German chess master and writer
