= Enea Vico =

Italian engraver

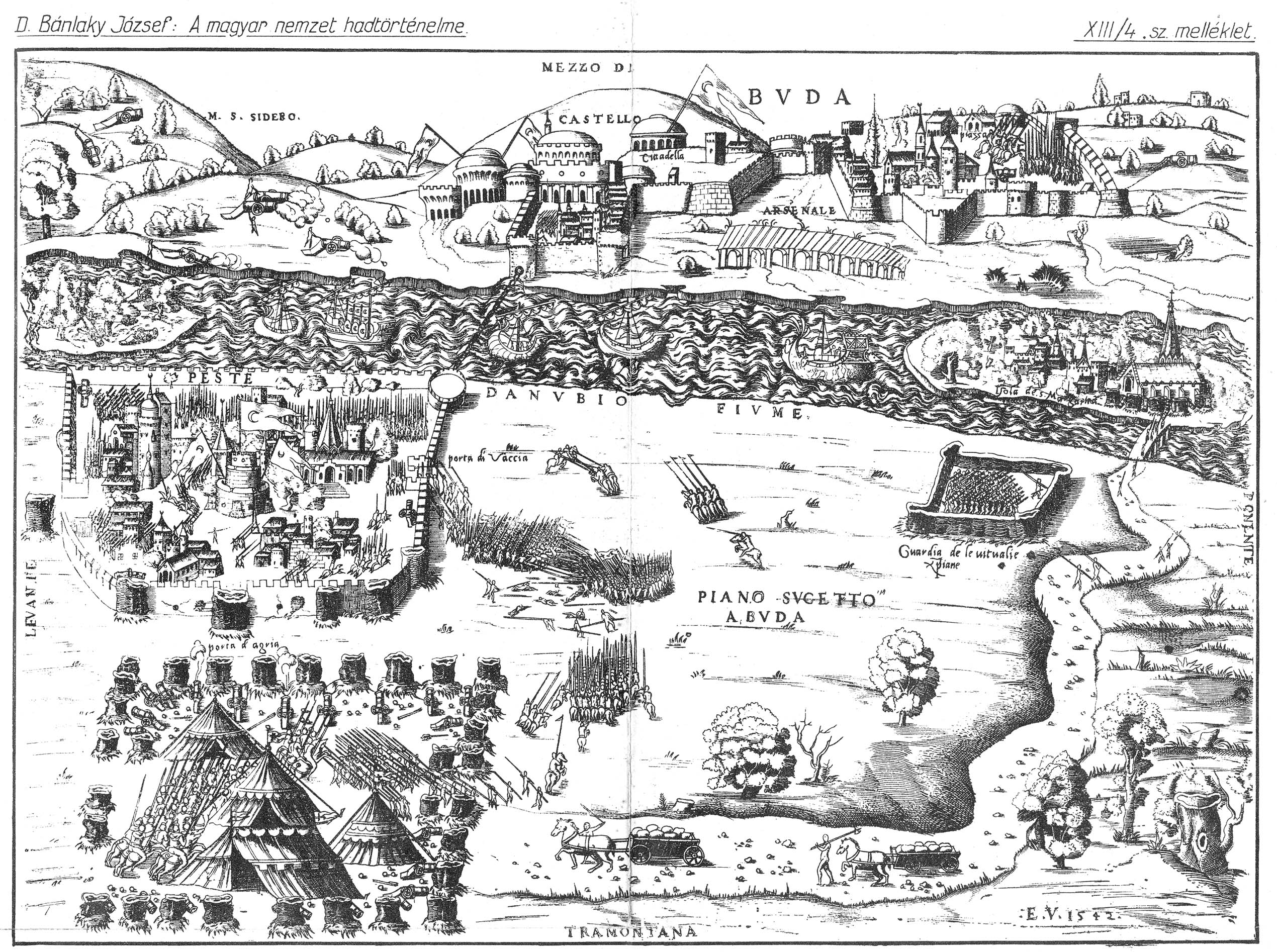
Enea Vico, The Siege of Buda and Pest, 1542

Enea Vico (29 January 1523 – 18 August 1567) was an Italian engraver.

Vico was born in Parma. He specialized in grotesque engravings based on antique paintings. Vico made engravings for Cosimo I de' Medici, Grand Duke of Tuscany and later Alfonso II, Duke of Ferrara. He died in Ferrara in 1567.
