= Deschler =

Deschler is a German language occupational surname for a purse- or bagmaker. Notable people with the name include:

- Joachim Deschler (c.1500–1571), German sculptor and medalist
- Lewis Deschler (1903–1976), American politician

== See also ==
- Teschner
- Purser (surname)
