= Antonia of Savoy =

Lady Consort of Monaco

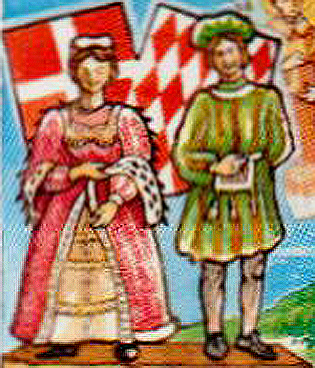
Antonia of Savoy and Jean II of Monaco

Antonia of Savoy (died 1500), was Lady of Monaco by marriage to Jean II, Lord of Monaco.

Antonia or Antoinette of Savoy was the illegitimate daughter of Philip II, Duke of Savoy and his mistress Libera Portoneri. She was raised in the household of the queen of France, Charlotte of Savoy. In 1487, she was arranged to marry the heir to the throne of Monaco in a peace agreement between Monaco and Savoy supported by France. The marriage was of high importance to Savoy, and part of a process completed in 1489, when Savoy acknowledged the independence of Monaco.

The couple had a daughter, Marie Grimaldi, who was in 1515 married to Geronimo della Rovere and was forced to renounce her rights to the throne upon her marriage.

Antonia of Savoy Born: 14?? Died: 1500
Preceded by Blanche del Carretto	Lady Consort of Monaco; 1494–1500	Succeeded by Jeanne de Pontevès-Cabanes
