= Augustine Grimaldi =

Augustine Grimaldi (1482 – 14 April 1532) was the ruler of Monaco (1523–1532), Bishop of Grasse, Abbot of Lérins, and founder of the village of Valbonne.

Augustine ruled Monaco as de facto regent for Honoré, but as de jure Lord for life by his mother Claudine's will.

== Family ==
Augustine was the son of Lambert Grimaldi, Lord of Monaco (1420–1494) and Claudine Grimaldi (1451–1515). Two of his brothers, Jean (1468–1505) and Lucien (1487–1523) were Lords of Monaco.

== Rule ==
Upon the assassination of his brother Lucien on 22 August 1523, Augustine was appointed de jure Lord, but de facto regent for Lucien's son Honoré, who was not yet a year old. He held this position for over 8 years, until his death at the age of 50 in 1532.

In 1524, to better avenge himself on his brother's murderers, Bartholomew Doria and Andrea Doria, Augustine deserted Francis I of France, with whom the Doria's were allied. He then swore allegiance to Charles V, Holy Roman Emperor and King of Spain, by the signing of the Treaties of Burgos and Tordesillas. This brought Monaco under Spanish protection, and Augustine was placed at the head of the government in Monaco. The alliance lasted from 1525 to 1641. This alliance weighed heavily on the financial situation of Monaco, and shortly before his death, Augustine admitted to regret for his actions in this regard.

During his rule, Charles V paid a visit to Monaco in 1529.

== Bishop and Abbot ==
Augustine served as Bishop of Grasse from 1505 until his death. He was also the Abbot of Lérins, a Cistercian monastery located on the island of Saint-Honorat, one of the Lérins Islands, on the French Riviera.

In 1516, he united his monastery at Lérins with the Cassinese Congregation. The church sent Giovanni Andrea Cortese (1483–1548), known within the order as Gregorio, to Lérins to introduce the Cassinese reform.

In 1519, Augustine commissioned a monk named Don Taxil to construct a village adjacent to the abbey, with the hope of attracting converts. Thus he is accredited as the founder of the village of Valbonne.

== Sources ==
- Jean de Pins (2007), Letters and Letter Fragments, p. 111 note 1; Google Books.
