= Lucien, Lord of Monaco =

Lord of Monaco from 1505 to 1523

Lucien
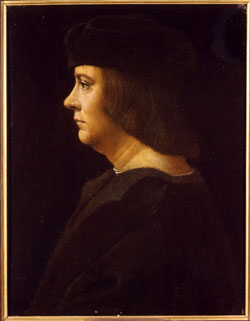

Lord of Monaco
- Reign: 11 October 1505 – 22 August 1523
- Predecessor: Jean II
- Successor: Honoré I (de facto) or Augustine (de jure)
- Co-ruler: Claudine (until 1515)
- Born: c. 1487; Monaco
- Died: 22 August 1523 (aged 35-36); Monaco
- Spouse: Jeanne de Pontevès-Cabanes
- Issue: Francesco Grimaldi; Claudine Grimaldi; Lamberto Grimaldi; Rainier Grimaldi; Honoré I
- House: Grimaldi
- Father: Lamberto Grimaldi
- Mother: Claudine Grimaldi, Lady of Monaco
- Religion: Roman Catholicism

Lucien (1487 – 22 August 1523) became Lord of Monaco on 11 October 1505, having murdered his predecessor and brother, Jean II, and held that sovereignty until his death.

== Family and Marriage ==
He was the fourth son of Lambert Grimaldi (1420–1494) and Claudine Grimaldi (1451–1515).

On 25 September 1514 he married Jeanne de Pontevès-Cabanes. The couple had at least five children;

- Francesco (born c. 1516 – died young)
- Claudine (born c. 1517)
- Lamberto (born c. 1519 – died young)
- Rainier (born c. 1521 – died young)
- Honoré (1522 – 7 October 1581)

== Murder of Jean II ==
At least two accounts of the murder portray it as arising from an argument between the brothers. According to Françoise de Bernardy's acclaimed history of the Princes of Monaco, it was almost midnight on the evening of October 5, 1505. Lord Jean II was staying in the family's house at Menton. Lucien and their mother, Claudine, were also in the house. No one knows what the brothers' argued about, but their quarrel ended with Lucien stabbing Jean with his dagger. In a graphic novel published by Dargaud in 1997, Lucien's explanation to his mother is that he lost his temper when Jean admitted to trying to sell Monaco to the Venetians behind their backs. This supports the account that Lucien gave in writing to the Duke of Savoy: "I remonstrated with him," Lucien wrote, "over the great wrong he was doing his brothers and sisters by planning dishonourably to sell this stronghold of [Monaco] to the Venetians...." Lucien claimed that his brother taunted him and even struck at him with his dagger before Lucien fought back in self-defense.

== Reign ==
By virtue of the cession of Claudine's rights, Lucien became Lord of Monaco. During Lucien's rule, his mother Claudine was the nominal ruler. After her 58-year reign, Claudine died in 1515.

A year after Lucien's reign began, Genoa broke free of France, and many of its people fled to Monaco for refuge. In December 1506, 14,000 Genoese troops besieged Monaco and its castle. The blockade lasted for five months, until Lucien was able to rout the Genoese in March 1507. Monaco, and by extension Lucien, was now in a tight spot, being subjects of France but caught in a diplomatic tight spot between France and Spain, trying to preserve its fragile independence.

In 1515, Lucien bought the feudal rights over the city of Mentone, retained by the family of Anne de Lascaris, Countess of Villars, thus bringing the city, as a whole, under Monaco's sovereignty until the French Revolution.

== Assassination ==
On 22 August 1523, Lucien was assassinated by his nephew, Bartholomew Doria of Dolceaqua, son of Lucien's sister Francoise Doria, at the Prince's Palace of Monaco. His body was dragged down the steps of the palace by Doria's men, to be shown to the disbelieving masses, thus inciting a riot wherein the people of Monaco chased Doria and his men out of the country.

Andrea Doria, the famous admiral and a cousin to Bartholomew, is believed to have had prior knowledge of the assassination. The full extent of his compliance in this event is speculation, stemming from his being in the Port of Hercules with his squadron of ships on the day of the assassination and his having received a message from Bartholomew that was sent out of the palace just moments before Bartholomew carried out the assassination. The message was believed to have been a ruse to get rid of Lucien's major domo and twelve or fourteen of Lucien's armed men, leaving Lucien alone in the company of his nephew, but for one slave.

Lucien was succeeded by de facto his youngest son Honoré, but by de jure his brother Augustine, in accordance with their mother Claudine's will.

Lucien, Lord of Monaco House of Grimaldi
Regnal titles
Preceded by Jean II	Lord of Monaco; 1505–1523 with Claudine (1505–1515)	Succeeded by Honoré I or Augustine
