= Jean II of Monaco =

Lord of Monaco from 1494 to 1505

Jean II
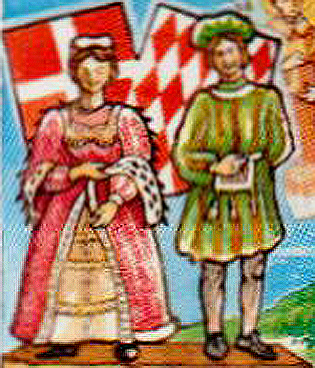
- Antonia of Savoy and Jean II of Monaco

Lord of Monaco
- Reign: 1494 – 1505
- Predecessor: Lambert
- Successor: Lucien
- Co-ruler: Claudine
- Born: 1468
- Died: 11 October 1505 (aged 36–37)
- Spouse: Antonia of Savoy
- Issue: Marie Grimaldi
- House: Grimaldi
- Father: Lamberto Grimaldi
- Mother: Claudine Grimaldi, Lady of Monaco

Jean II (1468 – 11 October 1505) was Lord of Monaco from March 1494 until his death.

== Family and Marriage ==
He was the eldest son of Lambert Grimaldi (1420–1494) and Claudine Grimaldi (1451–1515).

Jean married Antonia of Savoy, illegitimate daughter of the Duke of Savoy and his mistress Libera Portoneri, in 1486. They had a daughter named Marie Grimaldi.

== Reign ==
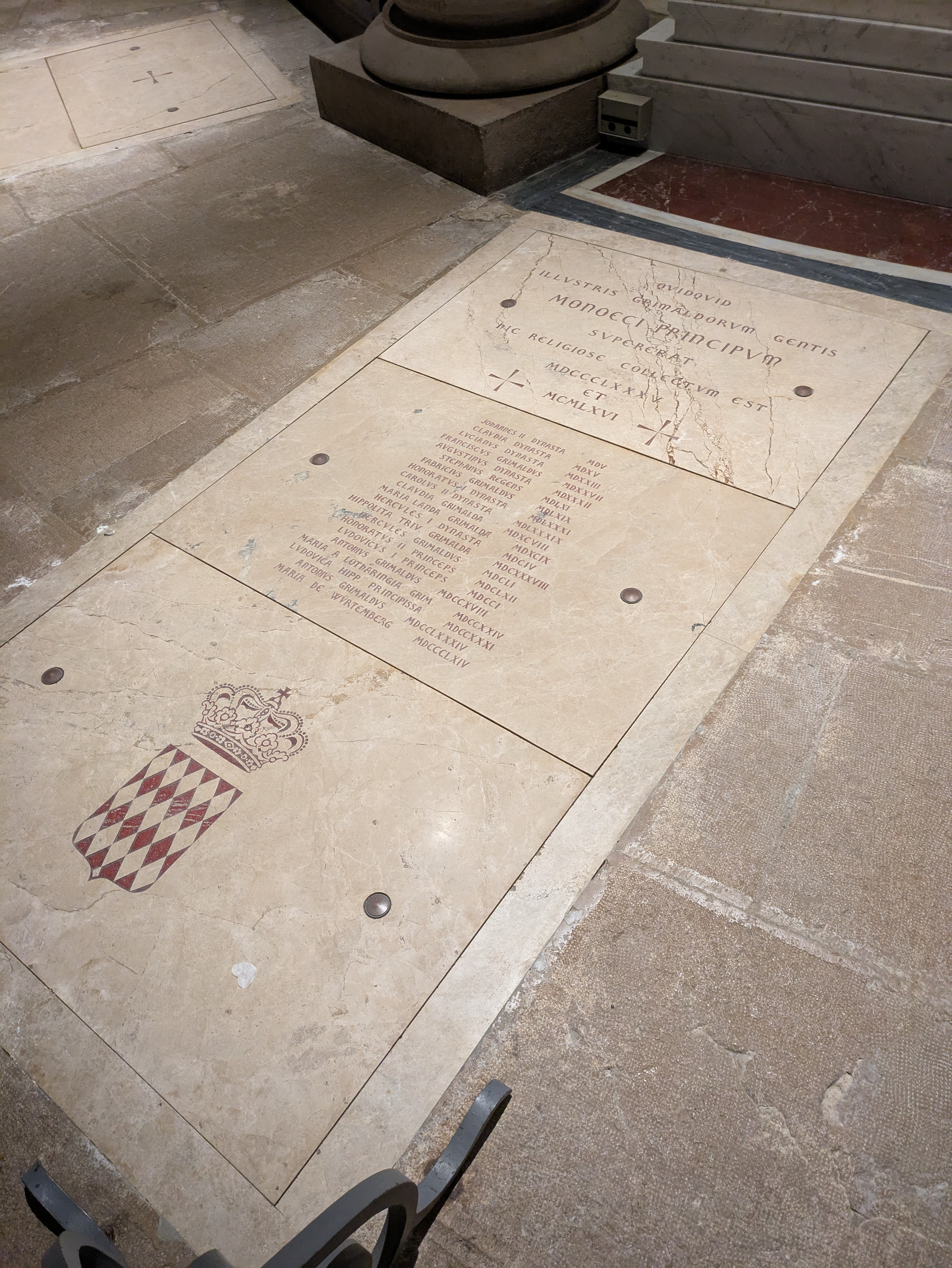
Grave in the Cathedral of Monaco

By virtue of the cession of Claudine's rights, Jean II became Lord of Monaco. Jean II directed the affairs of the state under the auspices of his mother Claudine.

During his 11-year reign, he pursued the politics of his father. He was made lieutenant of the Riviera by King Charles VIII of France.

He was murdered by his brother Lucien, who then became Lord of Monaco.

Jean II of Monaco House of Grimaldi
Regnal titles
Preceded by Lambert	Lord of Monaco; 1494–1505 with Claudine	Succeeded by Lucien
