= List of Monégasque consorts =

List of consorts of the sovereign prince or princess of Monaco

This article lists the consorts of the sovereign prince or princess of Monaco during their reign. Until 1612, the title was held by the spouse of the lord of Monaco.

Since her marriage to Albert II on 1 July 2011, Charlene has been princess consort of Monaco.

== Lady in Monaco ==
Picture	Name	Father	Birth	Marriage	Became consort	Ceased to be consort	Death	Spouse
	Aurelia del Carretto	Giacomo del Carretto, Margrave of Finale (Del Carretto)	1254	1295	8 January 1297 husband's accession	10 April 1301 husband's desposition	1307	François
	Salvatica del Carretto	Giacomo del Carretto, Margrave of Finale (Del Carretto)	–					Rainier I
	Margherita Ruffo	Enrico Ruffo, Lord of Seminara (Ruffo)	–					Rainier I
	Andriola Grillo	– (Grillo)	–					Rainier I
	Lucchina Spinola	Girardo Spinola, Lord of Dertonne (Spinola)	–	–	12 September 1331 husband's accession	15 August 1357 husband's death	–	Charles I
	Maria del Carretto	Giorgio del Carretto, Margrave of Finale (Del Carretto)	–	–	29 June 1352 husband's accession	15 August 1357 husband's desposition	1368	Rainier II
	Isabella Asinari in exile	– (Asinari)	–	after 1368		1407 husband's death	1417	Rainier II
	Lady Orsini	– (Orsini)	–	–	29 June 1352 husband's accession	15 August 1357 husband's desposition	–	Gabriel
	Antonia Spinetti	– (Spinetti)	–	–	29 June 1352 husband's accession	15 August 1357 husband's desposition	–	Antonio
	Baptistina	–	–	–	5 June 1419 husband's accession	1427 husband's abdication	–	Antonie
	Pomellina Fregoso	Pietro Fregoso, Doge of Genoa (Fregoso)	1387/1388	1427		8 May 1454 husband's death	1462	Jean I
	Bianca del Carretto	Galeotto I del Carretto, Margrave of Finale (Del Carretto)	1432	–	8 May 1454 husband's accession	July 1457 husband's death	1458	Catalan
	Antonia of Savoy	Philip II, Duke of Savoy (Savoy)	–	1486	March 1494 husband's accession	1500		Jean II
	Jeanne de Pontevès-Cabanes	Tanneguy de Pontèves, Lord of Cabanes (Pontèves)	–	25 September 1514		22 August 1523 husband's death	after 25 May 1555	Lucien
	Isabella Grimaldi	Giovanni Battista Grimaldi, Lord of Montaudion (Grimaldi)	–	8 June 1545		7 October 1581 husband's death	27 February 1583	Honoré I
	Maria Landi	Claudio Landi, 3rd Prince of Val di Taro (Landi)	–	15 December 1595		29 November 1604 husband's death	19 January 1599	Hercule

== Princely consort of Monaco ==
Picture	Name	Coat of arms	Father	Birth	Marriage	Became consort	Ceased to be consort	Death	Spouse
	Ippolita Trivulzio		Carlo Emanuele Teodoro Trivulzio, Count of Melzo (Trivulzio)	1600	13 February 1616		1638		Honoré II
	Catherine Charlotte de Gramont		Antoine III de Gramont, Duke of Gramont (Gramont)	1639	30 March 1660	10 January 1662 husband's accession	4 June 1678		Louis I
	Marie of Lorraine		Louis of Lorraine, Count of Armagnac (Lorraine)	12 August 1674	13 June 1688	2 January 1701 husband's accession	30 October 1724		Antonio I
	Jacques François Goyon de Matignon		Jacques III Goyon de Matignon (Goyon de Matignon)	21 November 1689	20 October 1715	26 February 1731 wife's accession	29 December 1731 wife's death	23 April 1751	Louise-Hippolyte
	Maria Caterina Brignole		Giuseppe Maria Brignole Sale, 7th Marquis of Groppoli (Brignole-Sale)	7 October 1737	5 June 1757		1770 divorce	18 March 1813	Honoré III
	Maria Caroline Gibert de Lametz		Charles-Thomas Gibert (Gibert de Lametz)	18 July 1793	27 November 1816	2 October 1841 husband's accession	20 June 1856 husband's death	25 November 1879	Florestan I
	Antoinette de Mérode		Count Werner de Mérode (Mérode)	28 September 1828	28 September 1846	20 June 1856 husband's accession	10 February 1864		Charles III
	Alice Heine		Michel Heine (Heine)	10 February 1858	30 October 1889		26 June 1922 husband's death	22 December 1925	Albert I
	Ghislaine Marie Françoise Dommanget		Colonel Robert Joseph Dommanget (Dommanget)	13 October 1900	24 July 1946		9 May 1949 husband's death	30 April 1991	Louis II
	Grace Kelly		John B. Kelly Sr. (Kelly)	12 November 1929	18 April 1956		14 September 1982		Rainier III
	Charlene Wittstock		Michael Kenneth Wittstock (Wittstock)	25 January 1978	1 July 2011		Incumbent	—	Albert II

=== Hereditary Princesses ===
Wives of Hereditary Princes of Monaco who never became Princesses of Monaco:

- Lady Mary Victoria Douglas-Hamilton, the first wife of Albert I, divorced in 1880
- Louise d'Aumont, wife of Honoré IV, divorced in 1798
- Maria Aurelia Spinola, wife of Ercole, Marquis of Baux
