= Landi family =

Northern Italian noble family

Landi
- noble family
- Coat of arms of the Landi family
- Country: Holy Roman Empire; Papal States
- Founder: Rodolfo Landi
- Estates: Val di Taro; Val di Ceno; Bardi; Borgotaro; Compiano; Venafro

The Landi family was an Italian noble family, originating in Piacenza, northern Italy. From 1551 to 1582, they were princes of the Val di Taro, now in the province of Parma, at that time in papal territory. Their principality is sometimes called Lo Stato Landi ("the Landi state"); although the term is not well known, there is substantial documentation of it in the Archivio Segreto Vaticano, in the Vatican City.

== History ==
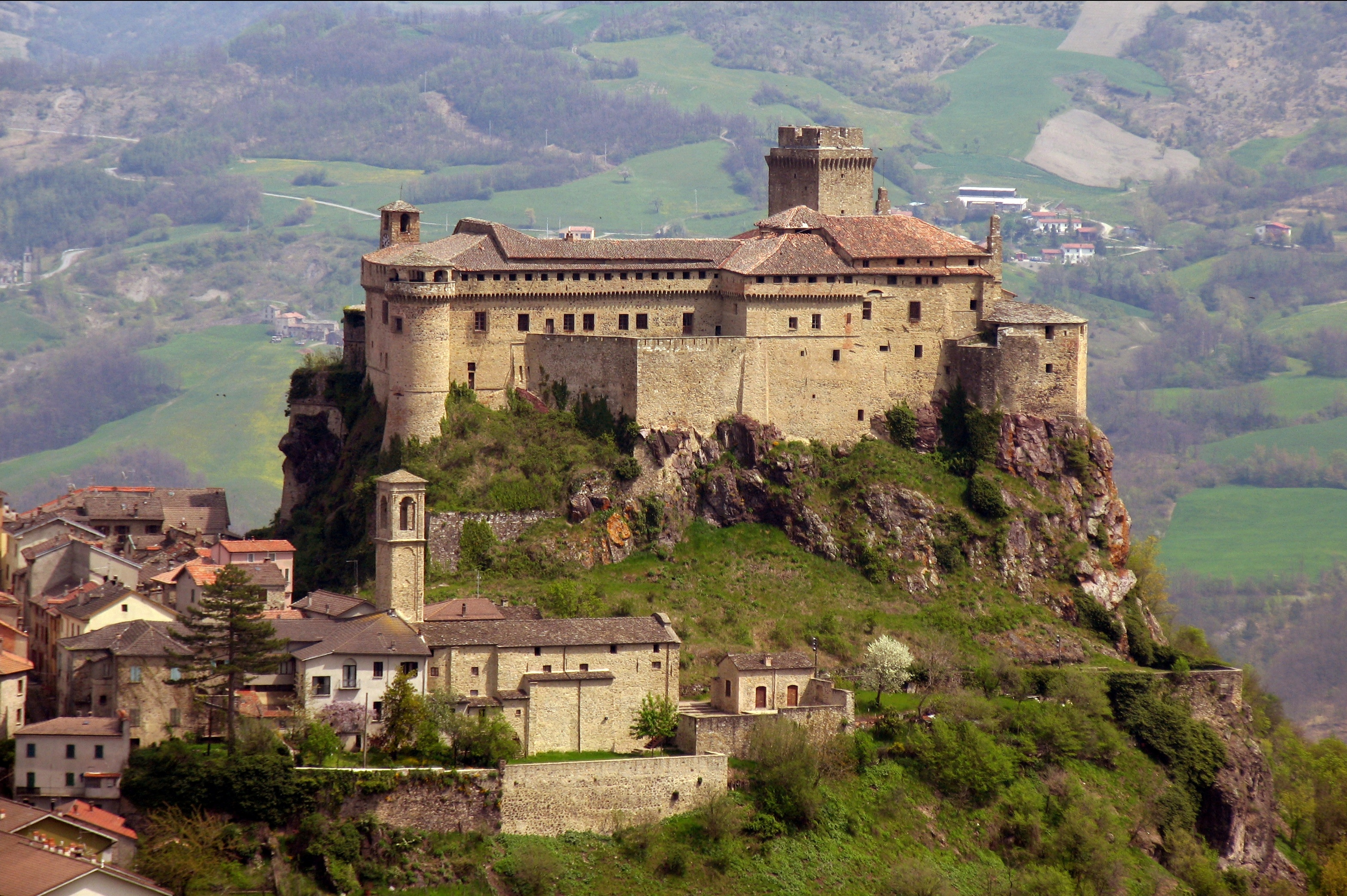
The castle of the Landi at Bardi

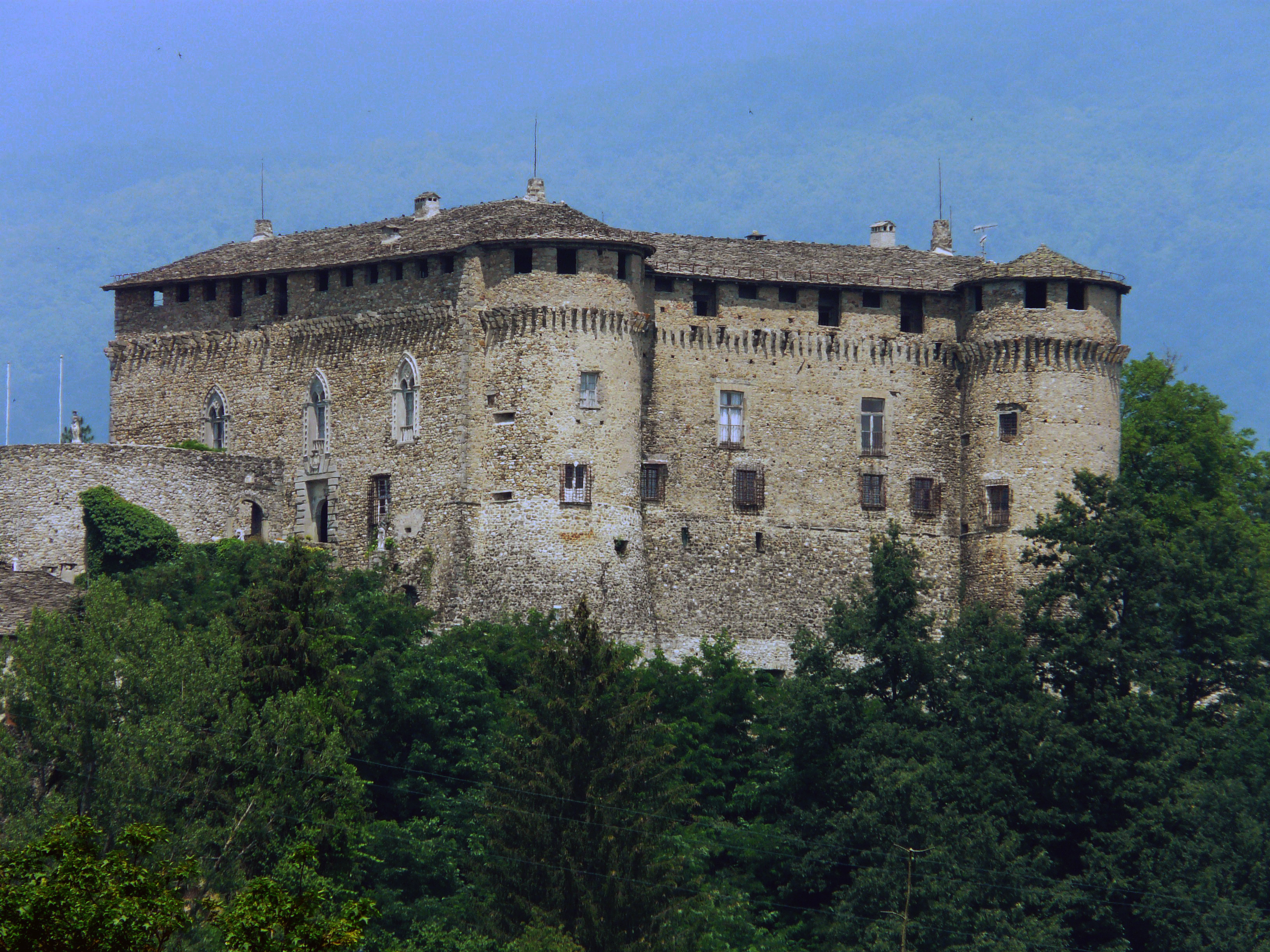
The castle of the Landi family at Compiano

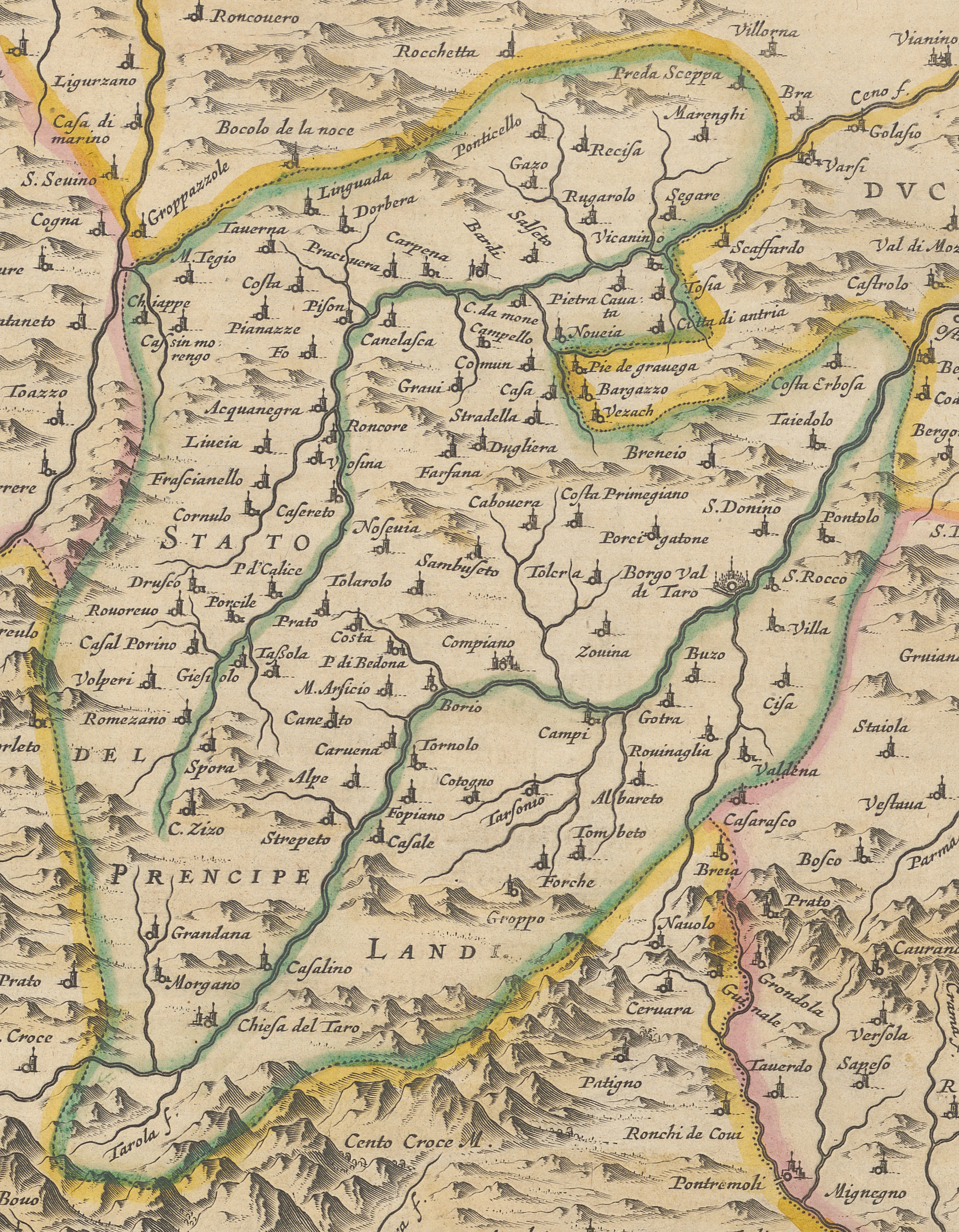
The princely state of the Landi family, princes of Val di Taro; fragment of the map of "Riveiera di Genova di Levante", page 57 of Geographiae blavianae: volumen octavum, quo Italia, quae est Europae liber XVI continentur of Ioannis Blaeu (1662)

The Landi were a feudal family from the area of Piacenza; they may have originated in Bobbio. They are thought to have descended from one Rodolfo Landi; however, it has also been suggested that they were descendants of an ancestor named Lando or Orlando. The family divided into several lines, of which the most notable is that of Compiano, which descended from Giannone Landi, a great-grandson of Rodolfo.

From mediaeval times, most of the Val di Taro was held by the Landi family. In 1582, their lands passed into the hands of Ottavio Farnese, Duke of Parma, following a failed conspiracy against the Farnese family, some thirty years before the better-known Sanvitale conspiracy. Claudio Landi, Prince of Val di Taro, plotted with Giambattista Anguissola and Giammaria and Cammillo Scotti to assassinate Farnese, but the plot was discovered; Landi lost the Val di Taro, and the other conspirators were executed. Landi was stripped of his titles and his feudal status in 1578 and condemned to death in 1580. However, as a prince of the Holy Roman Empire, he was not subject to the judgement of ordinary courts. He was pardoned on 27 September 1583 by the emperor Rudolf II, who also ordered Landi's confiscated lands returned to him; they were not.

His daughter, Maria Landi, married Ercole Grimaldi, Lord of Monaco, on 15 September 1595. After Lord Ercole was assassinated in 1604, Maria's brother, Federico Landi, became guardian of her son Honoré, then six years old, and regent of Monaco.
