= Honoré II of Monaco =

Lord/Prince of Monaco from 1604 to 1662

Honoré II
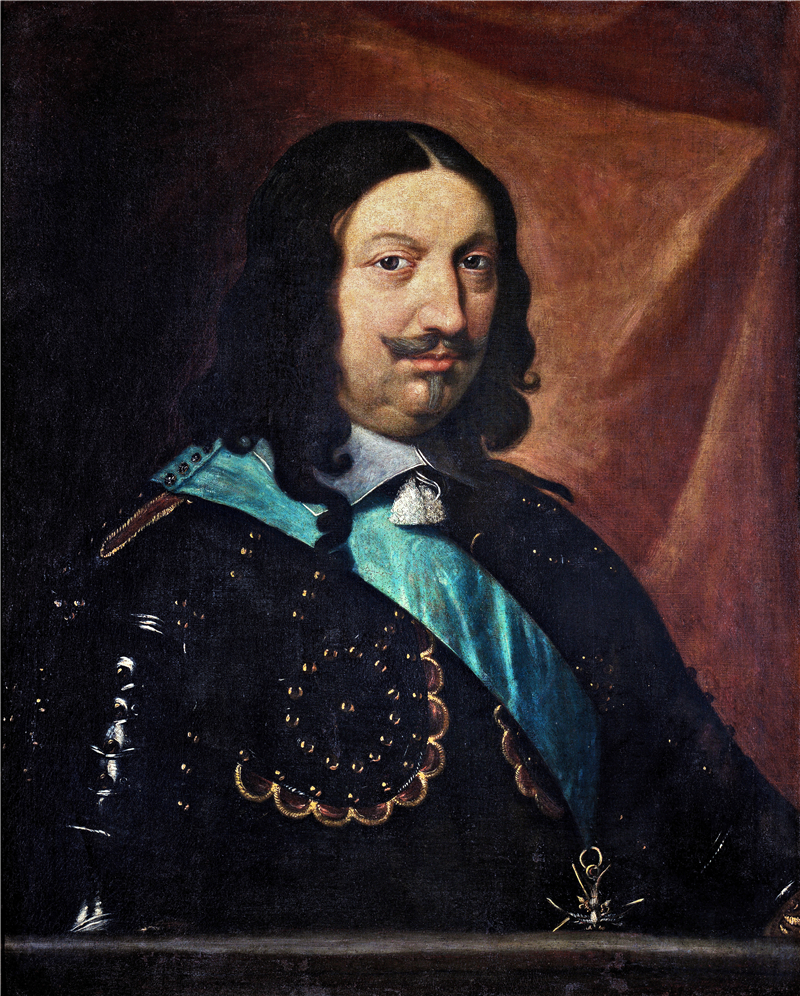
- Portrait by Philippe de Champaigne

Prince of Monaco
- Reign: 1612 – 10 January 1662
- Predecessor: Hercule (as Lord of Monaco)
- Successor: Louis I

Lord of Monaco
- Reign: 21 November 1604 – 1612
- Predecessor: Hercule
- Successor: Himself (as Prince of Monaco)
- Born: 24 December 1597; Monaco
- Died: 10 January 1662 (aged 64); Monaco
- Burial: Saint Nicholas Cathedral
- Spouse: Ippolita Trivulzio
- Issue: Hercules, Marquis of Baux
- House: Grimaldi
- Father: Hercule, Lord of Monaco
- Mother: Maria Landi

Honoré II (24 December 1597 – 10 January 1662) was Prince of Monaco from 1604 to 1662. He was the first to be called Prince (in 1612), but started his reign as Lord of Monaco.

== Early life ==
Honoré II was born on 24 December 1597. He was the son of Hercule, Lord of Monaco (24 September 1562 – 21 November 1604) and Maria Landi. His father was murdered when he was six, and he succeeded under the regency of his uncle, Frederico Landi, 4th Prince of Val di Taro. Landi was a loyal ally and friend of Spain and allowed the country to be occupied by Spanish troops in 1605. The inhabitants of Monaco were prohibited to carry arms and the prince and his two sisters were moved to Milan. The Council of Monaco tried to limit Spanish power, but the occupation lasted until 1614, and a strong Spanish influence remained until 1633, when it recognized Honoré as a sovereign prince.

== Adulthood ==
From adulthood, Honoré started to criticize Spain and turned to France for support. Louis XIII gave him the support he needed and this resulted in the Treaty of Péronne. This ended Spanish rule and put Monaco under French protection, recognizing and guaranteeing Monegasque sovereignty. As a consequence Honoré lost his Spanish and Italian possessions, but was compensated by King Louis XIII of France with the marquisate Les Baux and the title of Duke of Valentinois.

During his reign he did much to extend, rebuild and transform the Genoese fortress that was the Grimaldi's stronghold into what is today Monaco's Princely Palace.

== Marriage and family ==
On 13 February 1616 he married Ippolita Trivulzio (d. 1638). The couple had one son.

- Ercole Grimaldi, Marquis of Baux (1623 – 2 August 1651); married on 4 July 1641 to Maria Aurelia Spinola (d. 29 September 1670)
  - Louis (25 July 1642 – 3 January 1701)
  - Marie Hippolyte (8 May 1644 – 8 October 1694)
  - Jeanne Marie (b. 4 June 1645)
  - Maria Teresa (4 September 1648 – 20 July 1723) ancestress of Maria Teresa Cybo-Malaspina

After Hercules (Ercole, age 27) was killed in firearms accident, Louis became Honoré's heir at the age of 9.

== Death and legacy ==
Honoré died on 10 January 1662. He was interred in the Cathedral of St. Nicholas (it stood on the location of the current cathedral) in Monaco.

A collector's silver coin has been issued by the Treasury of Monaco portraying Honoré II on the occasion of the 400th anniversary (1612 – 2012) of the use of the title "Sovereign Prince." The silver coin has a €10 face value.

== Ancestors ==
Ancestors of Honoré II of Monaco

16. Lamberto Grimaldi, Lord of Monaco
8. Lucien Grimaldi, Lord of Monaco
17. Claudine Grimaldi, Lady of Monaco
4. Honoré I Grimaldi, Lord of Monaco
18. Tanneguy de Pontevès, Lord of Cabanes
9. Jeanne de Pontevès-Cabanes
19. Jeanne de Villeneuve
2. Hercule Grimaldi, Lord of Monaco
20. Giorgio Grimaldi
10. Giovanni Battista Grimaldi, Lord of Montaudion
21. Isabella Fieschi
5. Isabella Grimaldi
22. Agostino Pallavicini, Doge of Genoa
11. Maddalena Pallavicini
23. Eugenia Oliva Grimaldi
1. Honoré II, Prince of Monaco
24. Marcantonio Landi, 1st Prince of Val di Taro
12. Agostino Landi, 2nd Prince of Val di Taro
25. Costanza Fregoso
6. Claudio Landi, 3rd Prince of Val di Taro
26. Manfredo Landi, Count of Compiano
13. Giulia Landi, Countess of Compiano
27. Caterina Visconti Borromeo
3. Maria Landi
28. Diego Fernández de Córdoba y Hurtado de Mendoza, 1st Lord of Valenzuela
14. Álvaro Fernández de Córdoba y Zúñiga, 2nd Lord of Valenzuela
29. Francisca de Zúñiga y de la Cerda
7. Juana Fernández de Córdoba y Milá de Aragón
30. Nuño Manuel, Lord of Salvaterra de Magos
15. María Manuel y Milá de Aragón, Lady-in-waiting to Empress Isabella
31. Leonor Milá de Aragón

Preceded by Himself as Lord of Monaco	Sovereign Prince of Monaco; 1612–1662	Succeeded by Louis I
New Creation	Duke of Valentinois; 1642–1662	Succeeded by Louis I
Preceded by Hercule	Lord of Monaco; 1604–1612	Succeeded by Himself as Sovereign Prince of Monaco
