= Charles II of Monaco =

Lord of Monaco from 1581 to 1589

Charles II
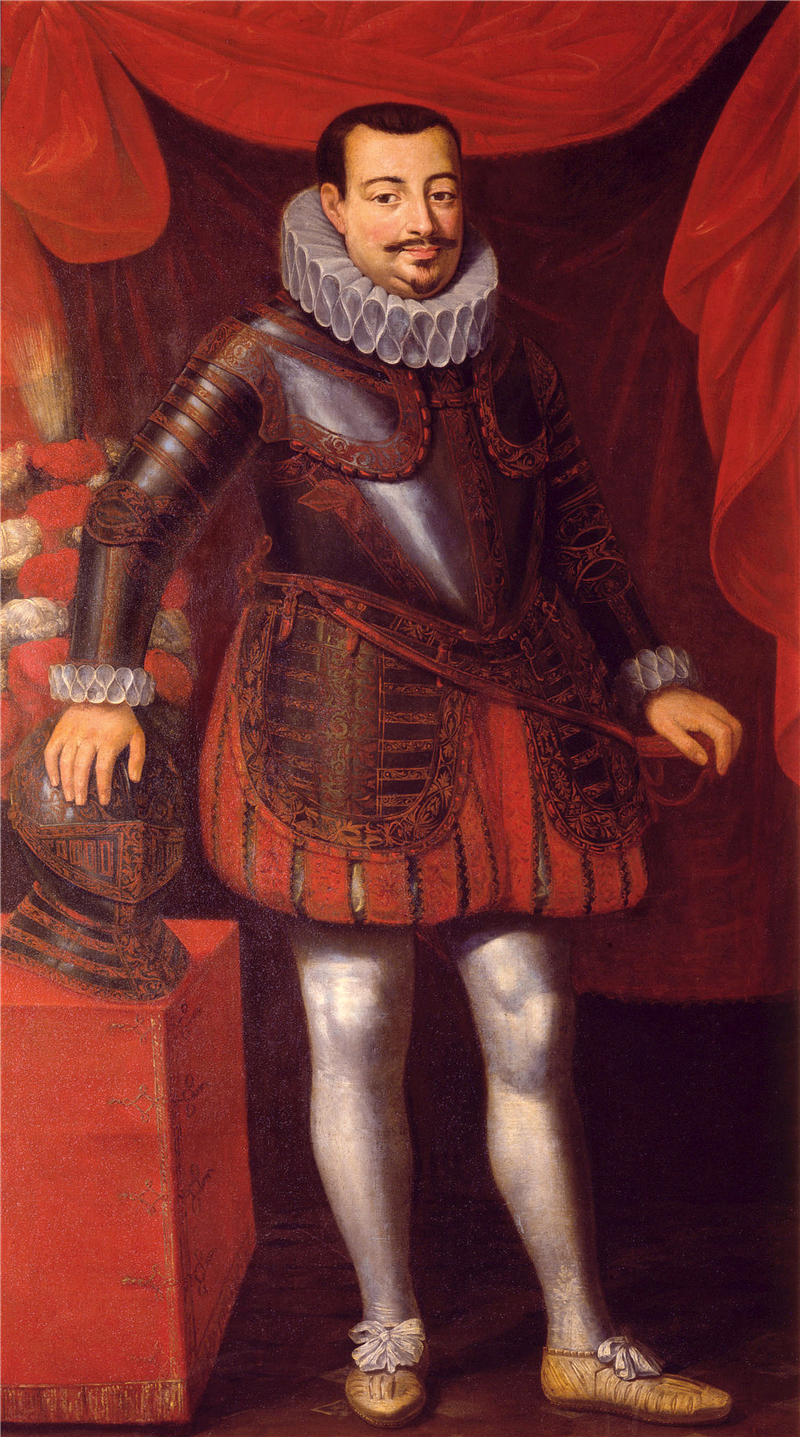
- Portrait c. 1584

Lord of Monaco
- Reign: 7 October 1581 – 17 May 1589
- Predecessor: Honoré I
- Successor: Hercule
- Born: 26 January 1555; Monaco
- Died: 17 May 1589 (aged 34); Monaco
- Burial: Saint Nicholas Cathedral, Monaco
- House: Grimaldi
- Father: Honoré I, Lord of Monaco
- Mother: Isabella Grimaldi
- Religion: Roman Catholicism

Charles II (26 January 1555 – 17 May 1589) was Lord of Monaco from 7 October 1581 to 17 May 1589.

Charles was the eldest son of Honoré I, Lord of Monaco (1522–1581), and Isabella Grimaldi (died 1583). He became lord on the death of his father in 1581.

Protected by Spain, due to the Treaties of 1524, Charles was the first lord of Monaco who refused to pay homage to the duke of Savoy for Mentone and Roccabruna. In 1583 he was declared, after a trial, to have forfeited those two cities.

Charles ruled for only 8 years before dying at the age of 33. He left no issue and so his youngest brother, Hercule, became lord of Monaco.

== Ancestors ==
Ancestors of Charles II of Monaco

16. Niccolò Grimaldi
8. Lamberto Grimaldi, Lord of Monaco
17. Sescarina Doria
4. Lucien Grimaldi, Lord of Monaco
18. Catalan Grimaldi, Lord of Monaco
9. Claudine Grimaldi, Lady of Monaco
19. Bianca del Carretto
2. Honoré I Grimaldi, Lord of Monaco
20. Antoine II de Pontevès, Lord of Cabanes
10. Tanneguy de Pontevès, Lord of Cabanes
21. Jacquette Monge
5. Jeanne de Pontevès-Cabanes
22. Louis de Villeneuve, Lord of Flayosc
11. Jeanne de Villeneuve
23. Colette de Castillon
1. Charles II Grimaldi, Lord of Monaco
24. Angelo Grimaldi
12. Giorgio Grimaldi
25. Rabella N.
6. Giovanni Battista Grimaldi, Lord of Montaudion
26. Giuliano Fieschi
13. Isabella Fieschi
27.
3. Isabella Grimaldi
28. Domenico Pallavicini
14. Agostino Pallavicini, Doge of Genoa
29. Maria Gentile
7. Maddalena Pallavicini
30. Pasquale Oliva Grimaldi, Lord of Rocca Grimaldi
15. Eugenia Oliva Grimaldi
31. Giulia Lomellini di Agostino

== Sources ==
- Bernardy, Françoise de (1961). Barker, John (ed.). Princes of Monaco: The Remarkable History of the Grimaldi Family. London: Barker. OCLC 1113944.
- Ulino, Maurizio (2008). L'Età barocca dei Grimaldi di Monaco nel loro Marchesato di Campagna (in Italian). Naples: Giannini Editore. ISBN 978-88-7431-413-3.
- Ulino, Maurizio (2015). "Dai Grimaldi ai Pironti". In D'Agostino, Guido; Maggio, Adriana; Ulino, Maurizio (eds.). Campagna 500°. Campagna nell'età moderna: chiesa, feudo, rivoluzione. Campagna: Ass. Giordano Bruno.

Preceded by Honoré I	Lord of Monaco; 1581–1589	Succeeded by Hercule
