= Valdena =

- Frazione
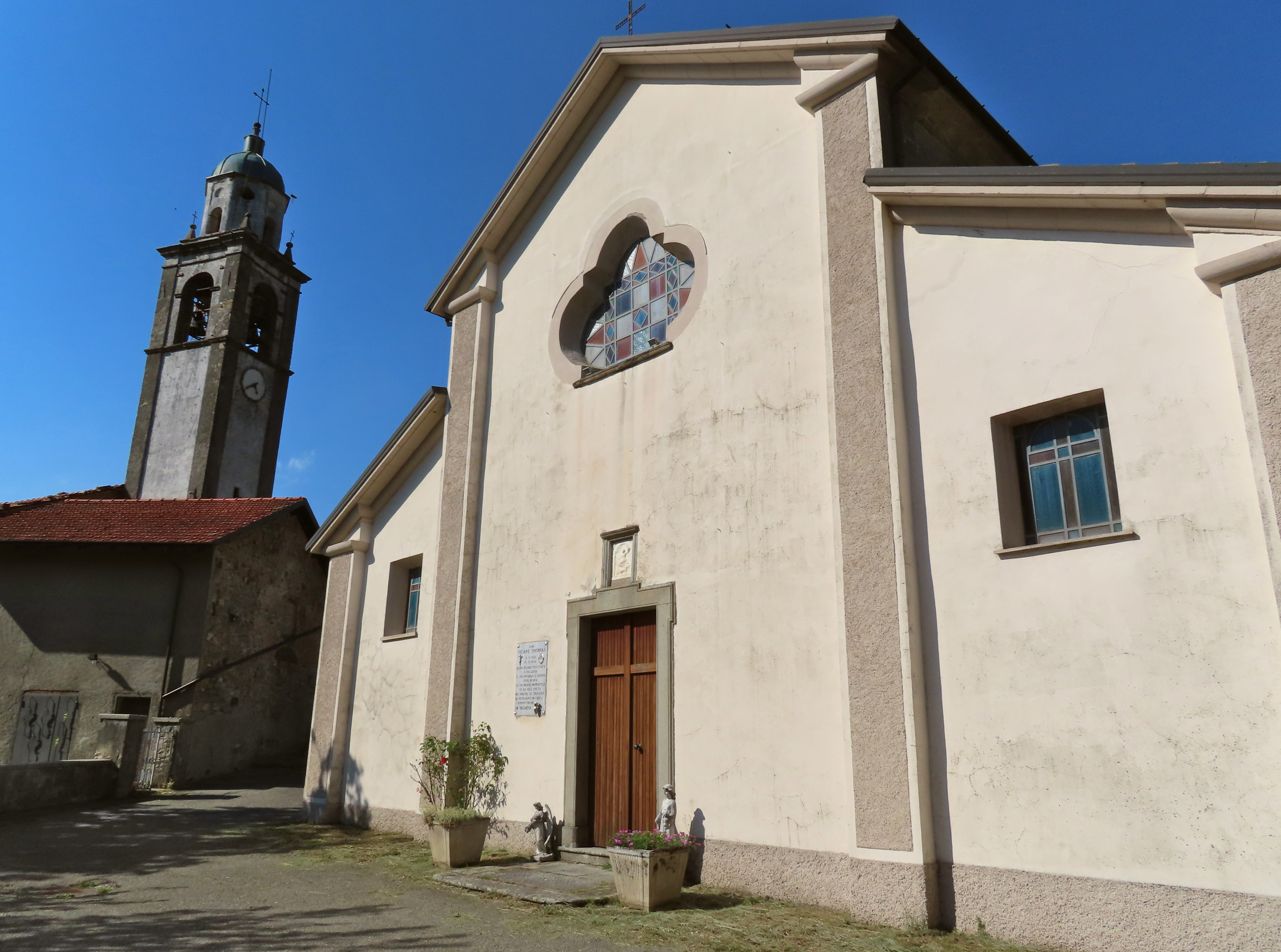

- Location of Valdena in Italy
- Coordinates: 44.270°N 9.470°E
- Country: Italy
- Region: Emilia-Romagna
- Province: Parma
- Comune: Borgo Val di Taro
- Time zone: UTC+1 (CET)
  - Summer (DST): UTC+2 (CEST)

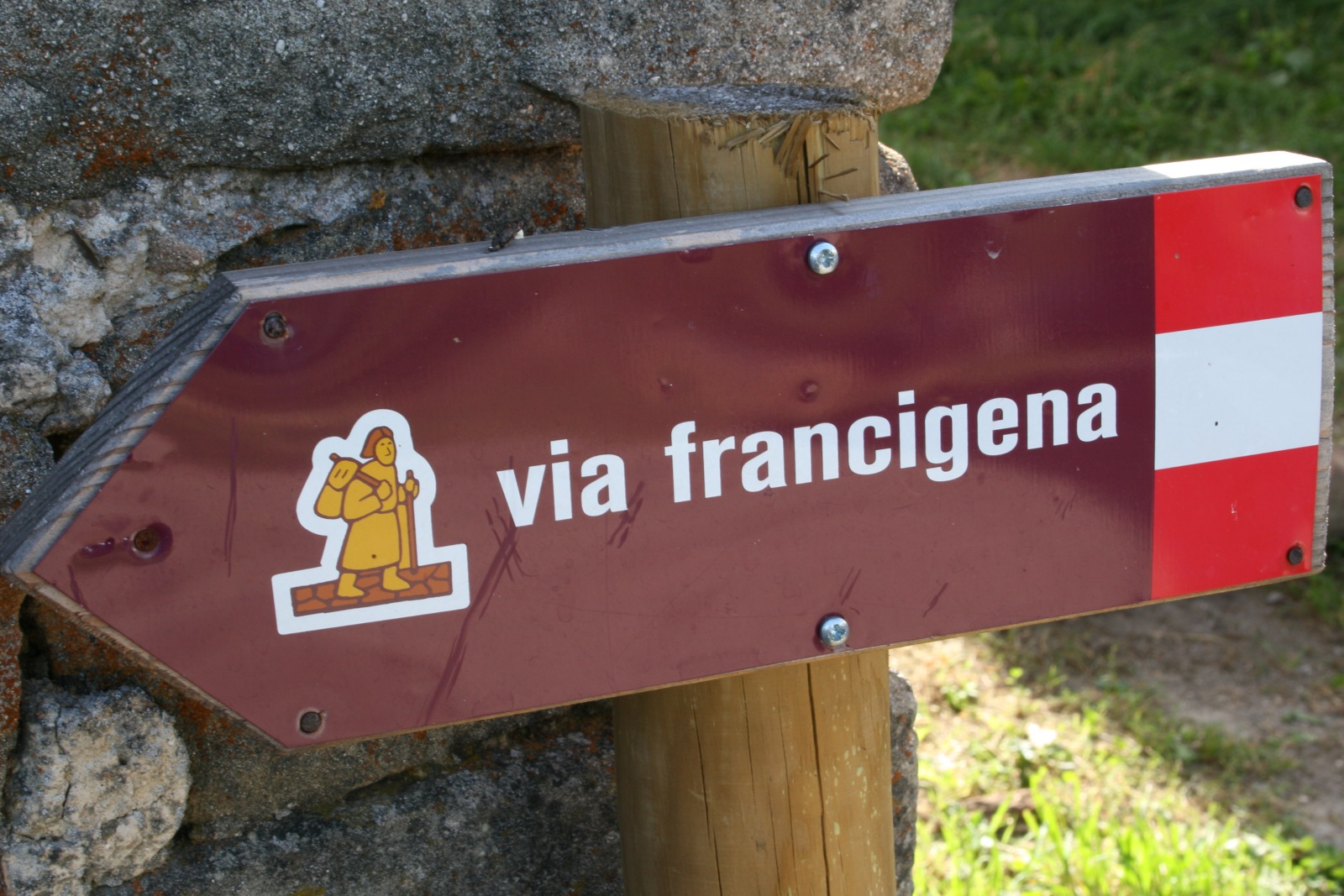

Valdena is a Frazione and village in Italy, that belongs to the comune of the town Borgo Val di Taro in the province of Parma, region Emilia-Romagna.

Valdena is located 4.54 kilometres (2.82 mi) to the south of Borgo Val di Taro and 67.54 kilometres (41.97 mi) from Parma.
