= Maria Landi =

Maria Landi (18 February 1570 – 19 January 1599), was a Lady consort of Monaco by marriage to Ercole Grimaldi, Lord of Monaco. Prior to her marriage, she served as regent of the principality of Val di Taro during the absence of her brother in 1592.

== Life ==
Maria Landi was a daughter of Claudio Landi, Prince of Val di Taro, and Juana Fernández de Córdoba y Milá de Aragón.

In 1592, she was appointed regent of the principality of Val di Taro during the absence of her brother Federico Landi (1573-1661) in Spain.

Maria married Grimaldi on 15 September 1595. The marriage was arranged through Ercole's good contacts at the Spanish court and gave him great prestige, as Maria was a descendant of the Royal House of Aragon through her mother, which made Ercole related to the king of Aragon and thereby the Spanish royal house. On the occasion of the marrage, the Palace of Monaco was decorated with frescoes depicting the shields of Grimaldi of Monaco and Landi of Bardi.

Maria Landi in 1599 after the birth of her last child. When her widower died five years later, her brother became the guardian of her son.

== Issue ==
She had three children:

- Giovanna Maria Grimaldi (29 September 1596 – December 1620), married Gian Giacomo Teodoro Trivulzio, Conte di Melzo, Principe di Musocco.
- Honoré II (Monaco, 24 December 1597 – Monaco, 10 January 1662) married Ippolita Trivulzio.
- Maria Claudia Grimaldi, Carmeline nun in Genoa (1 January 1599 – 1668).

Maria Landi Born: 1570 Died: 1599
Preceded by Isabella Grimaldi	Consort of Monaco; 1595–1599	Succeeded by Ippolita Trivulzio (as Princess of Monaco)
