= Ghislaine Dommanget =

Princess of Monaco from 1946 to 1949

- Coat of arms as consort

Princess consort of Monaco
- Tenure: 24 July 1946 – 9 May 1949
- Born: Ghislaine Marie Françoise Dommanget; 13 October 1900; Reims, France
- Died: 30 April 1991 (aged 90); Neuilly-sur-Seine, France
- Burial: Passy Cemetery, France
- Spouses: Paul Diey (m. 1923; died 1931) Louis II, Prince of Monaco (m. 1946; died 1949)
- Issue: Jean Gabriel Brulé
- Father: Robert Joseph Dommanget
- Mother: Marie Louise Meunier
- Occupation: Actress
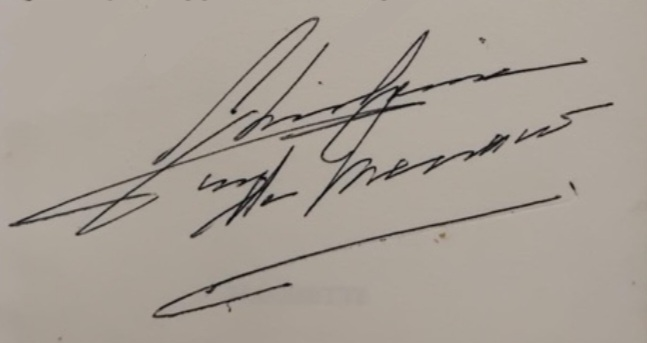
- Signature

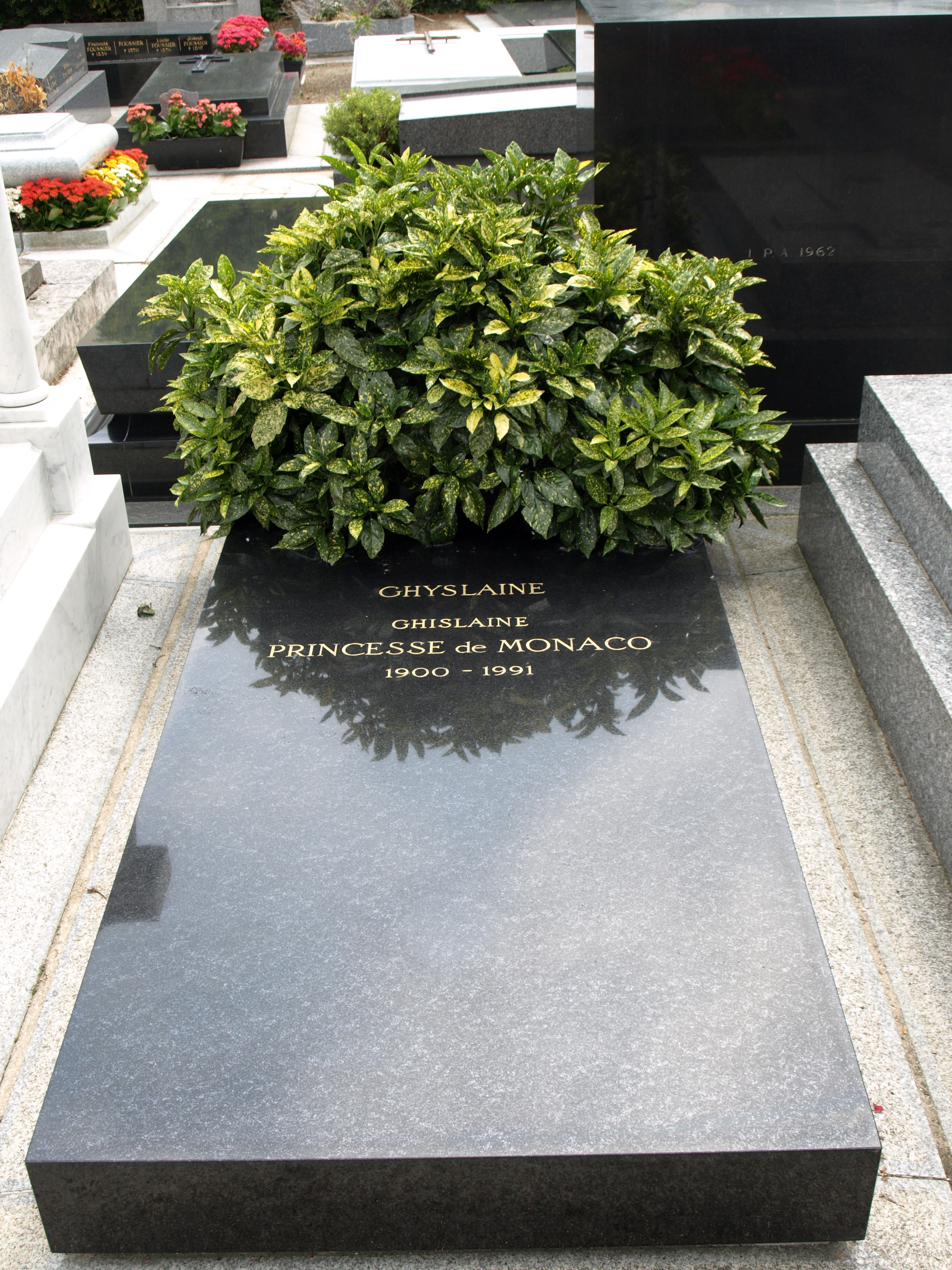
Grave of Ghislaine, Princess of Monaco

Ghislaine Marie Françoise Dommanget (13 October 1900 – 30 April 1991) was a French actress, and the Princess of Monaco as the wife of Prince Louis II from 1946 to 1949.

== Early life ==
Dommanget was born in Reims, France, as the daughter of Colonel Robert Joseph Dommanget (1867–1957) and his wife, Marie Louise Meunier (1867–1957).

== Personal life ==
In 1923, she was married to Paul Diey (1863–1931). After his death in 1931, she had a relationship with actor André Brulé. In 1934, she and Brulé welcomed a son, Jean-Gabriel Brulé.

She broke up with Brulé and married the reigning Prince of Monaco, Louis II, on 24 July 1946 — the first bride of a member of the House of Grimaldi without a dowry.

Following Louis II's death on 9 May 1949, and the accession of her step-grandson, Rainier III, she became Dowager Princess of Monaco, a title she held until her death.

== Notable published works ==
- Dommanget, Ghislaine (1964). "Sois princesse" -- dit-il. Hachette.

== Honours ==
National honours

- Monaco: Dame Grand Cross of the Order of Saint-Charles (24 October 1946).

Foreign honours

- France:
  - Knight of the Order of the Legion of Honour (25 June 1947).
  - Commander of the Order of Public Health (14 July 1948).
- Holy See: Benemerenti Medal (8 January 1948).

Monegasque royalty
Vacant Title last held by Alice Heine	Princess consort of Monaco; 1946–1949	Vacant Title next held by Grace Kelly
