= Rovinaglia =

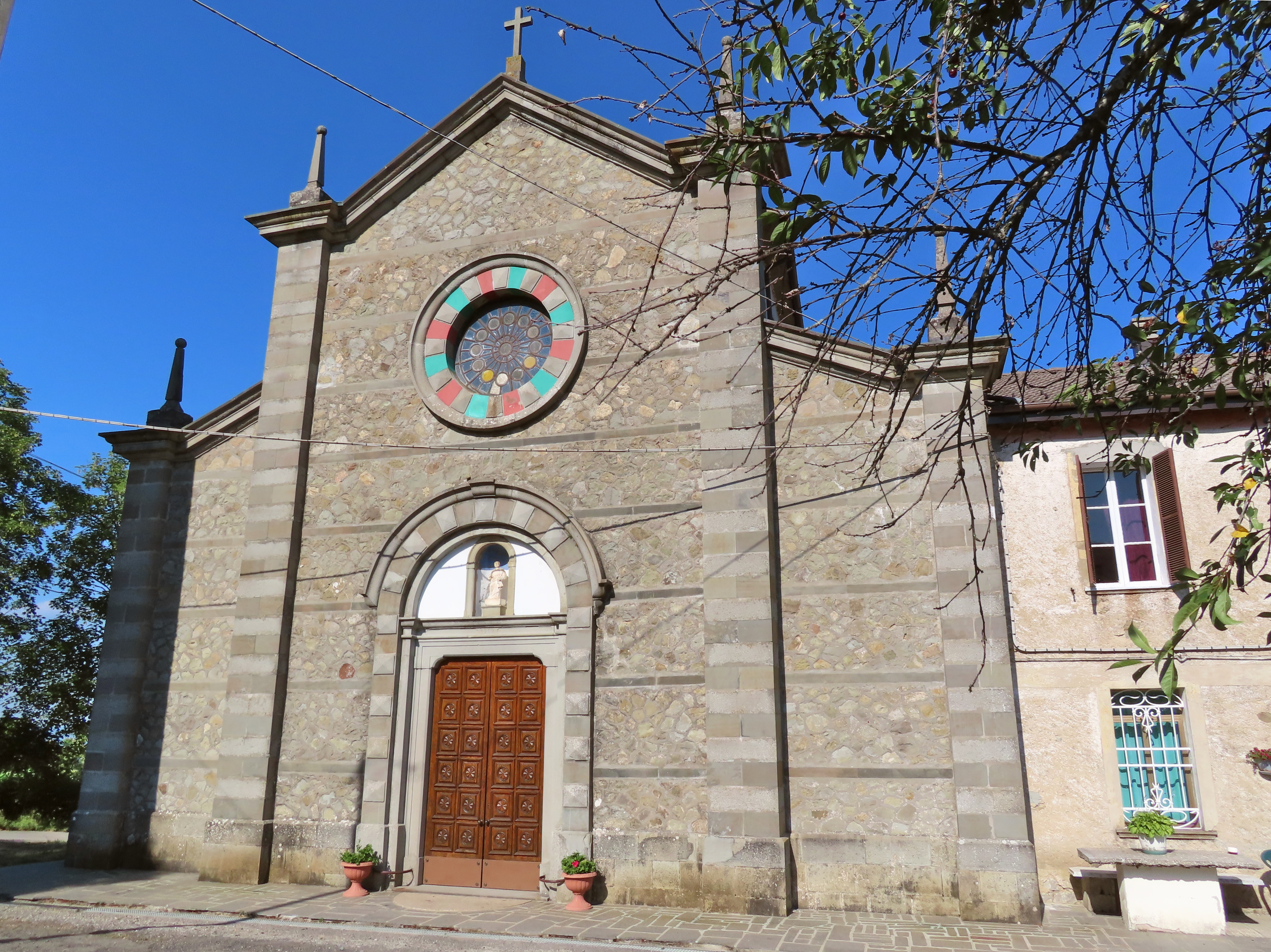
San Pietro Apostolo

Rovinaglia is a frazione in the comune of Borgo Val di Taro in the province of Parma, Italy.
