= Gian Giacomo Trivulzio =

15th/16th century Italian nobleman and mercenary commander

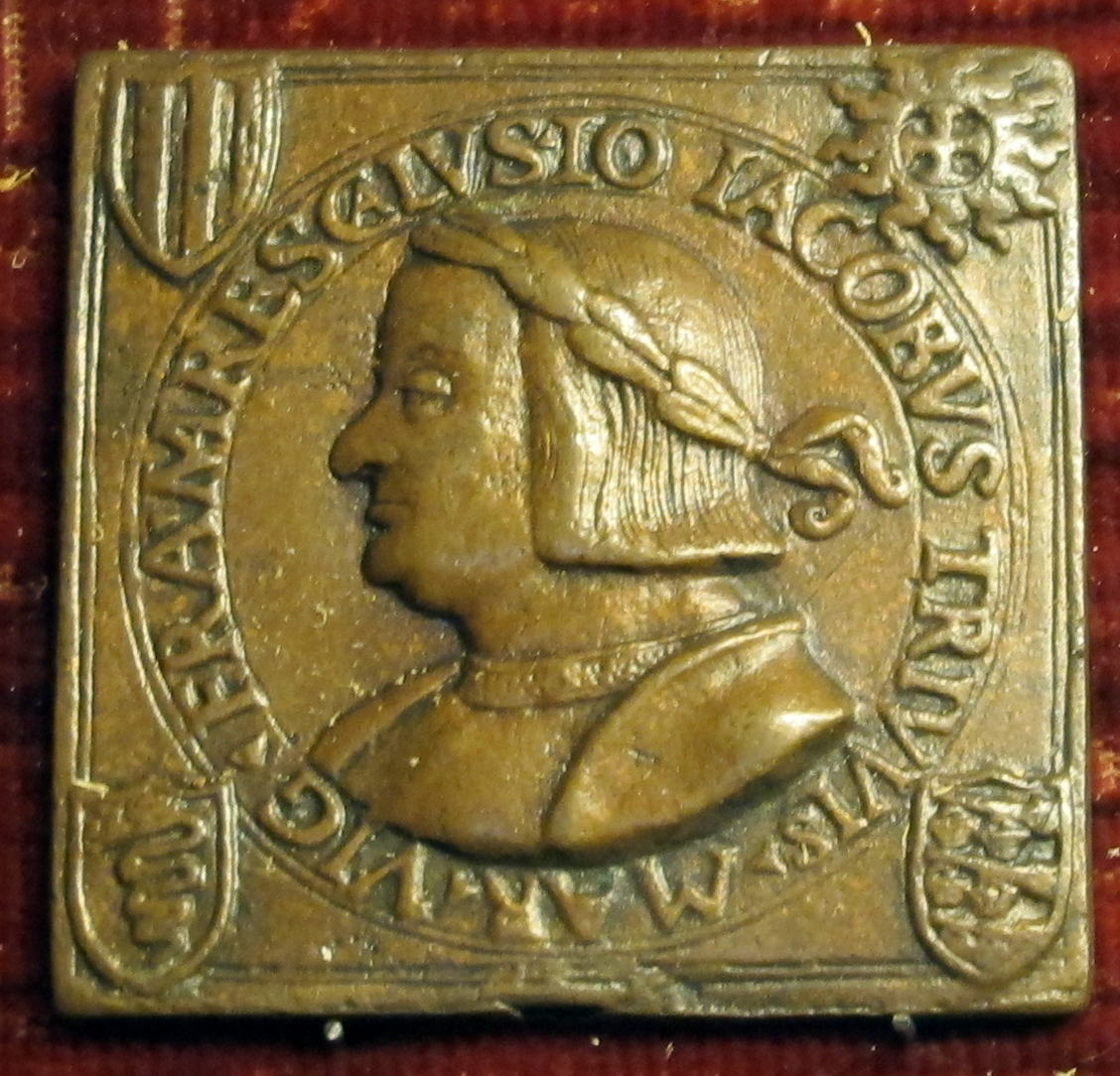
- Plaquette by Cristoforo Foppa (died 1527)
- Born: c. 1440; Milan, Duchy of Milan
- Died: 5 December 1518 (aged 77–78) Milan, Duchy of Milan
- Known for: Marshal of France
- Other work: Aristocrat and statesman
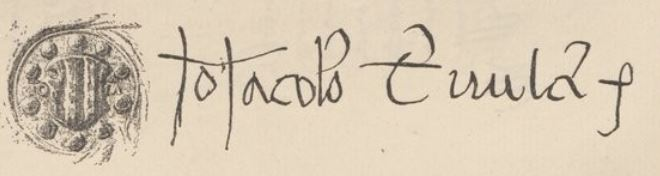
- Signature

Gian Giacomo Trivulzio (French: Jean-Jacques Trivulce; 1440 or 1441 – 5 December 1518) was an Italian aristocrat, statesman, and condottiero who played a prominent role during the Italian Wars. Originally serving the Duchy of Milan, he later became a leading military commander for Louis XII of France, contributing significantly to the French conquest of Milan in 1499, after which he was appointed Governor of the city and awarded the title of Marshal of France. Trivulzio is also remembered for his pragmatic view on warfare, famously stating that "to carry on war, three things are necessary: money, money, and yet more money."

== Biography ==
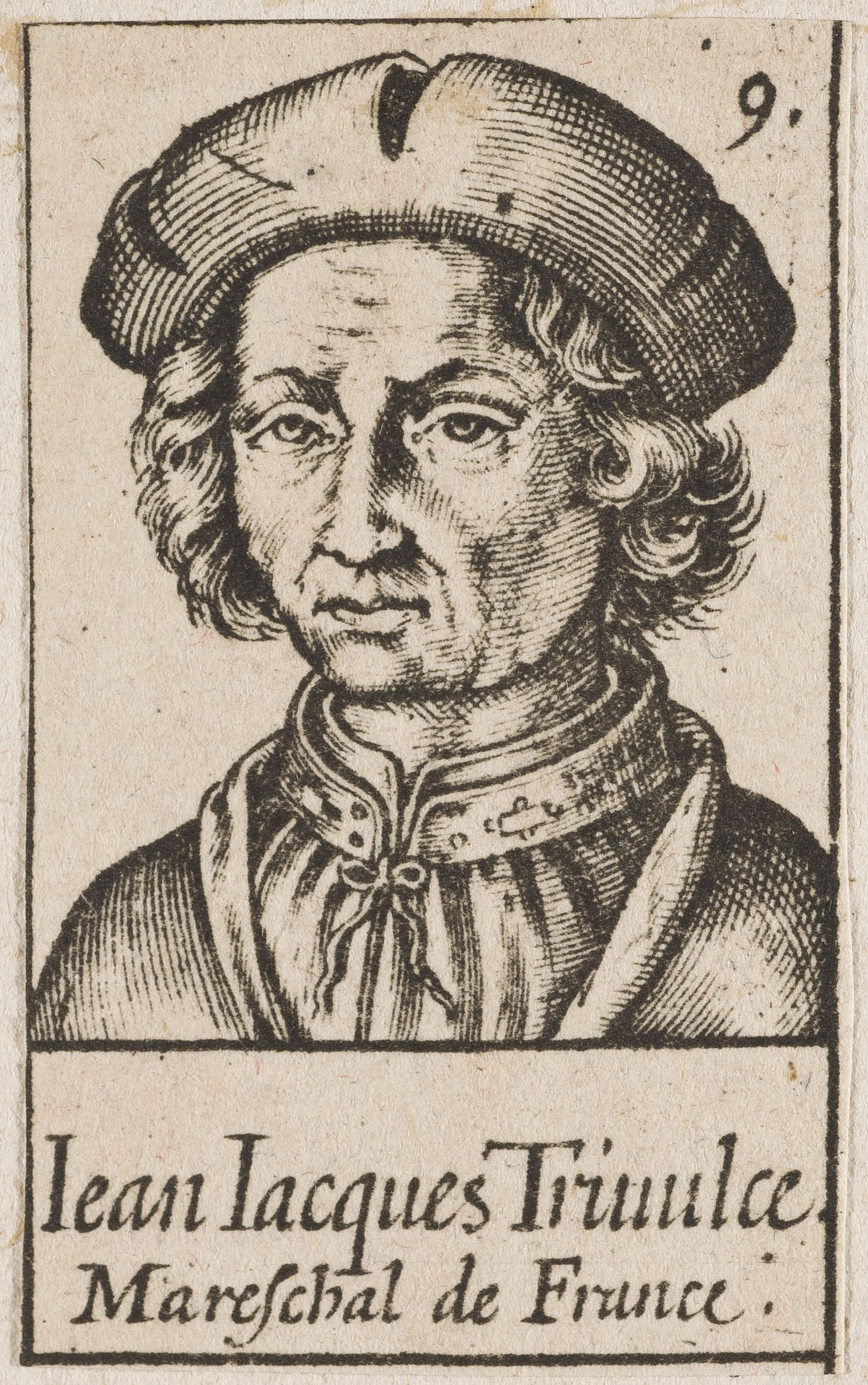
"Iean Iacques Triuulce / Mareschal de France." (engraving by Léonard Gaultier, c. 1580–1600)

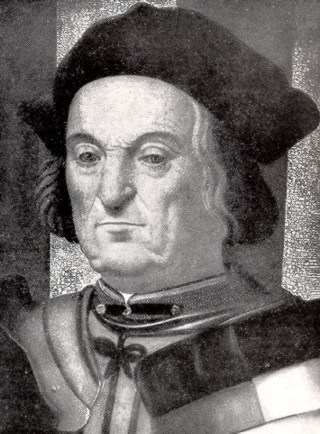
Gian Giacomo Trivulzio.

Trivulzio was born in Milan into the ancient and noble House of Trivulzio, a prominent Milanese family that had held power and lands in Lombardy since at least the 12th century. He received his early education in Milan, where he studied, among others, with Galeazzo Maria Sforza. In 1465, he followed the latter's army to France to support King Louis XI. He also took part in the Milanese campaigns against Bartolomeo Colleoni and fought alongside Federico III da Montefeltro in the wars in Romagna. In 1478, he supported the Florentines against Pope Sixtus IV's expansionism. Two years later, he acquired the castle of Mesocco. In 1483, he abandoned Ludovico Sforza and switched his allegiance to Charles VIII of France. In 1484, he defeated the Venetians at Martinengo.

In 1488, he married Beatrice d'Avalos, after his first wife (Margherita Colleoni) had died. In June of the same year, he moved to southern Italy, entering the service of the Kingdom of Naples and its ruler Ferdinand of Aragon. The same year, Isabella of Aragon, daughter of Prince Alfonso and granddaughter of King Ferdinand, married Gian Galeazzo Sforza, formally Duke of Milan. In 1493, the young duke asked his father-in-law for support to regain his ducal power from his uncle, the Regent Ludovico il Moro. Ludovico then asked Charles VIII to invade Naples. Charles swept away any resistance in Italy and soon forced the Neapolitans to sign a peace treaty. The treaty was negotiated by Trivulzio, who in the meantime had been named commander-in-chief of the Neapolitan army. Impressed by Trivulzio's capabilities, Charles decided to engage him, with Ferdinand's permission, for a salary of 10,000 ducats a year.

Trivulzio marched toward France with Charles' army. When the retreating French were attacked by the League of Venice in the Battle of Fornovo (1495), he fought with the French army. On June 15, 1495, he was appointed governor of Asti and was given noble titles and territories in France. After Charles died in 1498, his successor, Louis XII, mustered a large army under Trivulzio to conquer the Duchy of Milan from Ludovico. Trivulzio took several fortified towns and forced Ludovico to abandon Milan. On 6 October 1499, he presented Louis XII with the keys of the city. Louis made him governor of Milan; he had already made him a Marshal of France on 29 September.

Trivulzio also took part in the victorious Battle of Agnadello against the Republic of Venice, and commanded contingents of the French army at Novara and (this time allied with the Venetians against the Swiss) Marignano. In 1516, he successfully defended Milan from the assault of Emperor Maximilian I. However, the high taxes insisted on by the French and reports about his behaviour as governor caused him to fall into disgrace soon afterwards. He went to France to regain his position from King Francis I, but in vain. He died at Arpajon (France) in 1518. His nephew, Teodoro Trivulzio, was also a military commander under France, and was briefly governor of Milan, Genoa and Lyon.

== Patronage of art ==
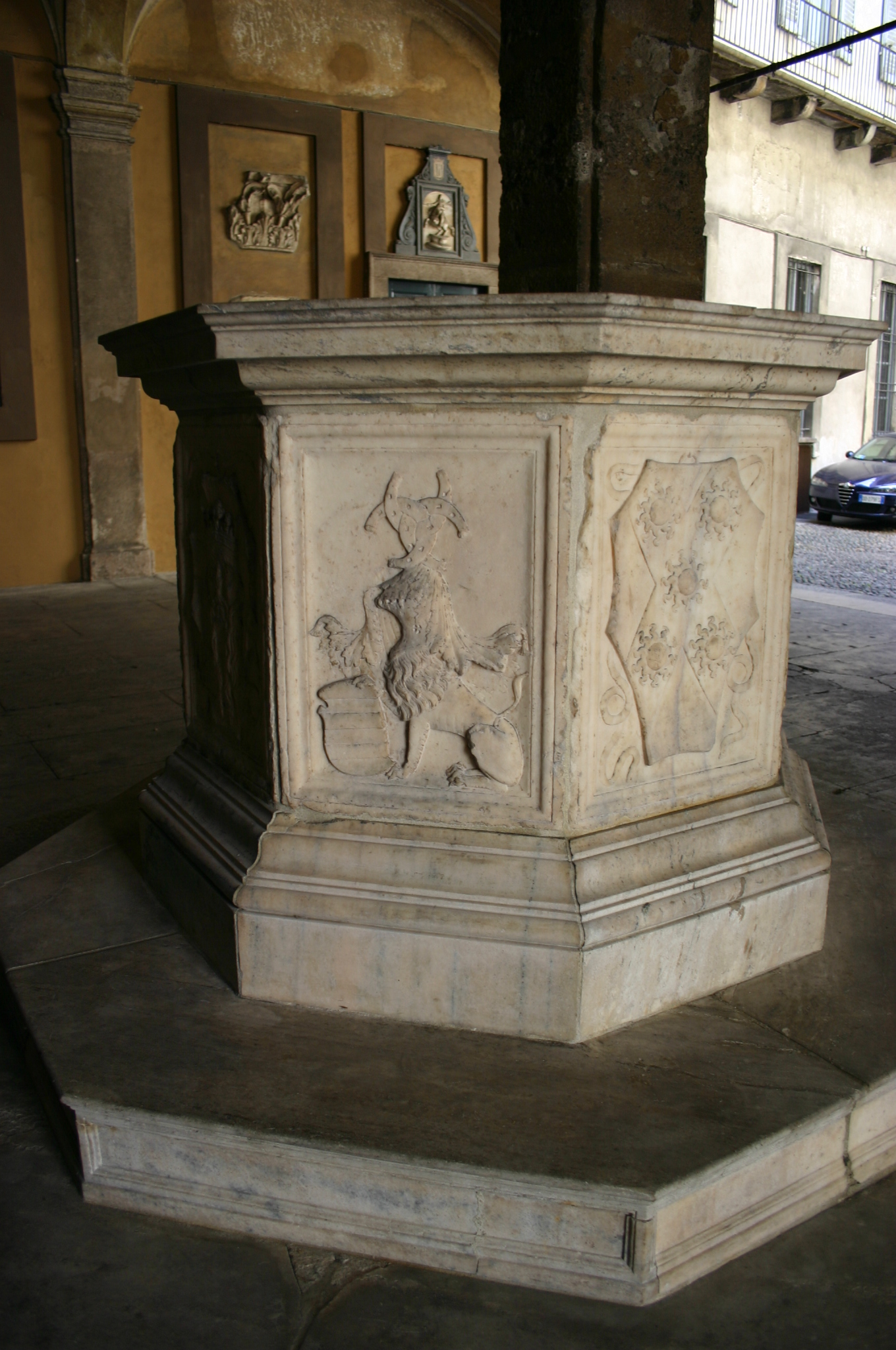
Wellhead with the armorial devices of Trivulzio and Sforza (Palazzo Trivulzio, Milan)

Trivulzio accumulated huge amounts of money, which he used in part as a patron of the arts, in particular of works by Bramantino. These include the Trivulzio Mausoleum in the Basilica of San Nazaro in Brolo, where he was buried, and the tapestry cycle of the Twelve Months, now in the Castello Sforzesco in Milan. Leonardo da Vinci converted his design for a large equestrian statue of Francesco Sforza to depict Trivulzio instead, but it never progressed beyond impressive drawings.
