= Ercole, Lord of Monaco =

Lord of Monaco from 1589 to 1604

Ercole
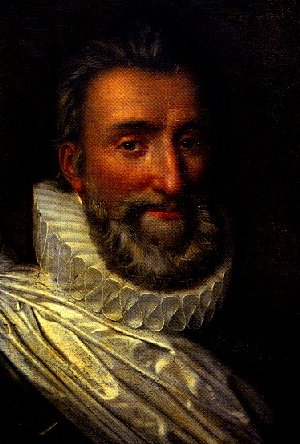

Lord of Monaco
- Reign: 17 May 1589 – 29 November 1604
- Predecessor: Charles II
- Successor: Honoré II
- Born: 24 September 1562; Monaco
- Died: 29 November 1604 (aged 42); Monaco
- Burial: Saint Nicholas Cathedral
- Spouse: Maria Landi
- Issue: Giovanna, Princess of Musocco; Honoré II, Prince of Monaco; Maria Claudia Grimaldi
- House: Grimaldi
- Father: Honoré I, Lord of Monaco
- Mother: Isabella Grimaldi
- Religion: Roman Catholicism

Ercole (24 September 1562 – 29 November 1604) was Lord of Monaco from 17 May 1589 until his death on 29 November 1604 aged 42.

Ercole was the youngest of four sons of Lord Honoré I (1522–1581) and Isabella Grimaldi. His eldest brother Charles II became lord of Monaco on the death of their father in 1581. Ercole's two elder brothers Francois (1557–1586) and Horace (1558–1559) predeceased Charles, thus leaving Ercole as his eldest brother's heir. When Charles died without issue in 1589, Ercole succeeded him.

Ercole married Maria Landi on 15 September 1595; the marriage produced three children;

- Giovanna Maria Grimaldi (29 September 1596 – December 1620), married Gian Giacomo Teodoro Trivulzio, Conte di Melzo, Principe di Musocco.
- Honoré II (Monaco, 24 December 1597 – Monaco, 10 January 1662) married Ippolita Trivulzio.
- Maria Claudia Grimaldi, Carmelite nun in Genoa (1 January 1599 – 1668).

Ercole was murdered in 1604 and his six-year-old son Honoré became Lord of Monaco under the regency of Ercole's brother-in-law, Frederico Landi, 4th Prince of Val di Taro. Honoré was the first Lord of Monaco to be called Prince of Monaco.

Preceded by Charles II	Lord of Monaco; 1589–1604	Succeeded by Honoré II
