= Cristoforo Foppa =

Italian sculptor (1445 – c. 1527)

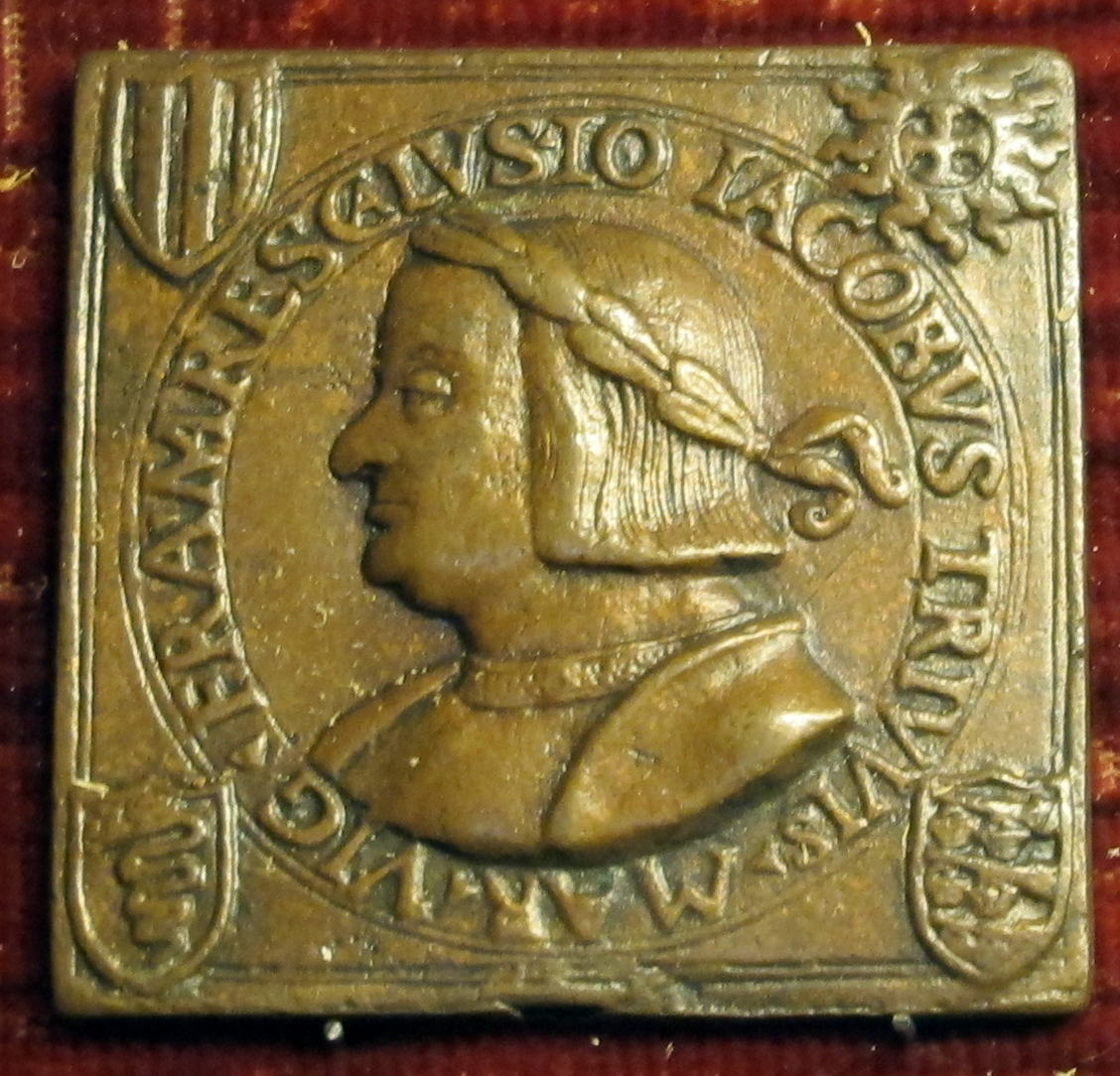
Plaquette or square medal of Gian Giacomo Trivulzio

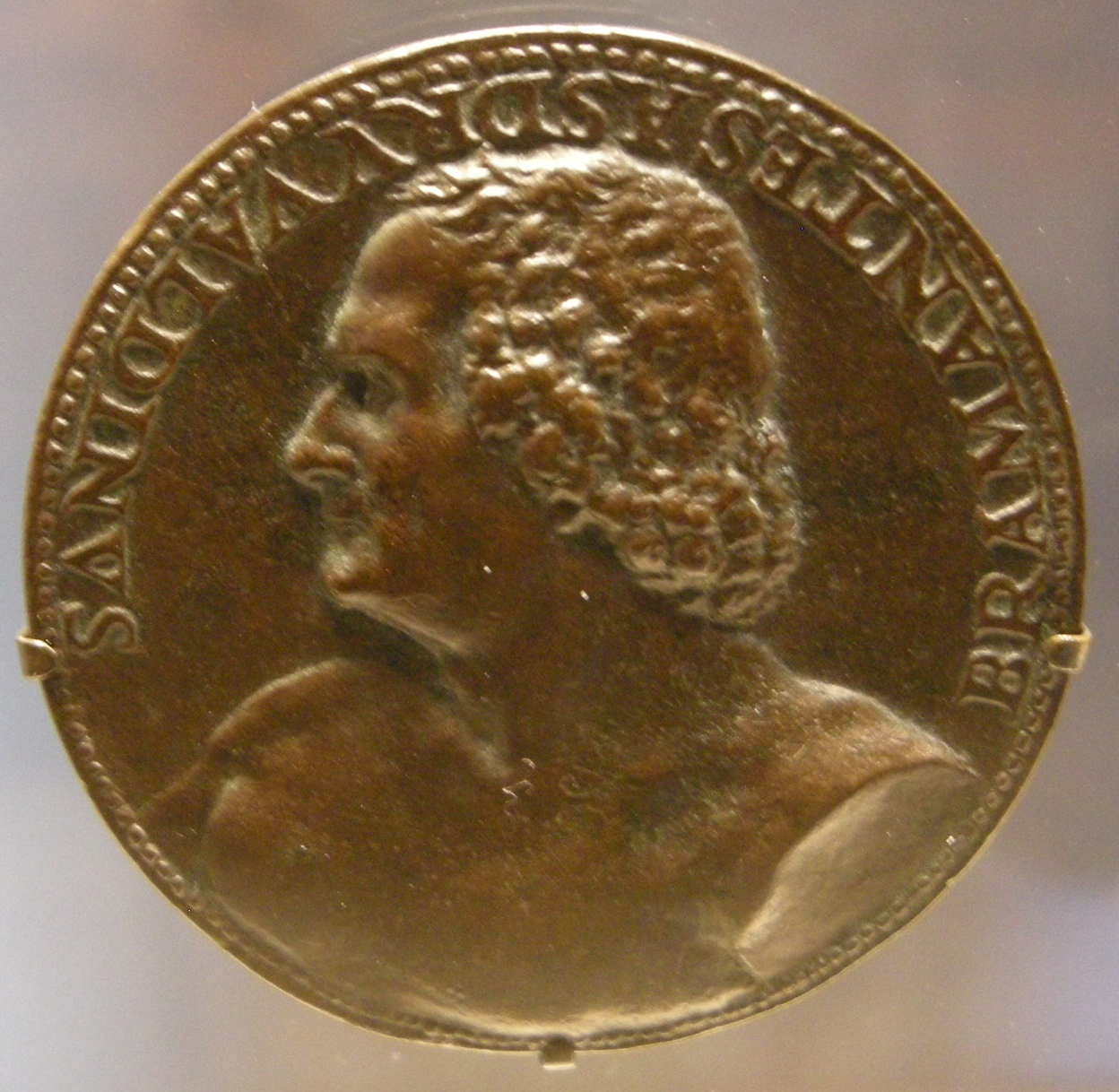
coin by Antonio Missaglia, depicting profile of Donato Bramante, National Gallery of Art, 1506

Cristoforo (known as Caradosso) Foppa (1445 – c. 1527) was an Italian goldsmith, sculptor, and die sinker.

== Biography ==
According to some sources, he was born at Olgiate Molgora (in the frazione of Mondonico) in the Province of Lecco, and according to others in Pavia. It is possible that this artist is not correctly known as Ambrogio, but that his Christian name was Cristoforo.

He was in the service of Lodovico Il Moro, Duke of Milan, for some years, and executed for him a medal and several pieces of goldsmith's work. He worked in Hungary in the service of King Matthias Corvinus, probably in August 1489; a later visit to the court was cut short by the King's death in 1490. Later on, he is heard of in Rome, working for Popes Julius II and Leo X.

His will was executed in 1526, and he is believed to have died in the following year.

== Works ==
Giorgio Vasari refers at some length to a medal struck by him in Rome, having upon it a representation of Bramante and his design for St. Peter's Basilica, and he speaks of him as "the most excellent goldsmith of that time, who has no equal in the execution of dies". He is said by some to have been responsible for the terracotta reliefs in the sacristy of San Satiro in Milan. In addition to the Bramante and Moro medals, three others are attributed to him, one representing Julius II, another the fourth Duke of Milan, Francesco Sforza, and the third Gian Giacomo Trivulzio.

A large number of examples of goldsmith's work in the sacristies of the various churches of Italy are attributed to Foppa with more or less uncertainty. They especially include reliquaries, morses, and crosiers. He was responsible for a papal mitre made for Pope Julius II, a drawing of which is held at the Department of Prints and Drawings at the British Museum and was executed at the request of an English collector named John Talman. An inaccurate engraving of it by George Vertue is also in existence, and this was reproduced by Muntz in his article on the papal tiara. He declared that the pope told his master of ceremonies that it cost two hundred thousand ducats. It survived the sack of Rome through the accident of its being in a pawn shop at the time, but was deliberately broken up and refashioned by Pope Pius VI. Foppa is believed to have designed several pendant jewels, but there is uncertainty respecting his goldsmith's work, and little can be attributed to him with authority.
