= Dommanget =

Dommanget is a French surname. Notable people with the surname include:

- Ghislaine Dommanget (1900–1991), French actress and the Princess consort of Monaco
- Maurice Dommanget (1888–1976), French historian
