= Trivulzio =

Coat of arms of the Trivulzio family

The House of Trivulzio is the name of an old Italian noble family with princely titles (Val Mesolcina in 1622-1766, and Musocco since 1885), most closely associated with Milan, whose members were prominent politicians, military men and various clergymen, whose first members are recorded since the 10th century.

== History ==
The noble and ancient Trivulzio family was one of the great families of Milan and Lombardy, originally from the current Province of Pavia (in particular from the municipality of Trivolzio, from which they took the surname), holder of numerous fiefs (Melzo, Borgomanero, Retegno, Casteldidone, Vigevano, Mesocco, Codogno, Omate, etc.), whose first members are recorded since the 10th century.

The family reached its apogee in the second half of the fifteenth century, at the time of the Sforza, who favored its rise, only to be betrayed by the same Trivulzio, who passed to the service of the Kings of France.

Although some authors indicate the origins of the Trivulzio family between the 10th and 11th centuries, there is certain documentary evidence of its existence only starting from the 12th century. In 1277 the Archbishop Ottone Visconti mentioned the family among the 200 of the Milanese aristocracy whose members were authorized to be created canons of the Milan cathedral.

In any case, the family entered Milanese politics only starting from the 15th century with various prominent personalities both in the military and in the administrative sphere. They make their residence in the Porta Romana district.

Giovanni Trivulzio (d. 1423) was the first to join the council of the Decurions of Milan. His son, Antonio, embarked on a military career in the service of Duke Filippo Maria Visconti and took part as a leader in the war against the Republic of Venice, being appointed ducal commissioner in Crema from 1441 to 1442, passing to the stronghold of Ancona under the government of Francesco I Sforza, not before passing after the death of Duke Visconti among the promoters of the Golden Ambrosian Republic. In 1450 he was included in the ducal council by the will of Francesco Sforza.

The historic buildings attributable to the Trivulzio family are numerous, important and spread over a large territorial space. Among these is the Trivulzio Palace located in Milan owned by the family since the end of the fifteenth century, home to the Library and the Trivulziana Collection which today are located in the Castello Sforzesco. Cristina Trivulzio, later Princess Barbiano of Belgiojoso d'Este, was born in this palace.

== Notable members ==
- Gian Giacomo Trivulzio (1440 or 1441–1518), Italian aristocrat and Marshal of France, notable for his role in the Italian Wars and as Governor of Milan under Louis XII
- Antonio Trivulzio, seniore (1457–1508), Italian Cardinal and papal diplomat
- Teodoro Trivulzio (1458–1531), Italian condottiero and nephew of Gian Giacomo; served France during the Italian Wars
- Scaramuccia Trivulzio (d. 1527), Italian Cardinal
- Antonio Trivulzio, iuniore (d. 1559), Italian Cardinal and bishop
- Gian Giacomo Teodoro Trivulzio (1597–1656), Italian Cardinal
- Ippolita Trivulzio (1600–1638), noblewoman, wife of Honoré II of Monaco and mother of Louis I
- Giorgio Pallavicino Trivulzio (1796–1878), Italian patriot during the Risorgimento and senator after 1860
