= Sanvitale conspiracy =

Plot to assassinate Ranuccio I Farnese and his family

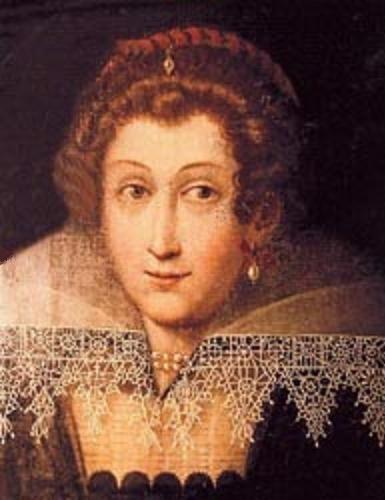
Barbara Sanseverino, portrait by an unknown painter, now in the Palazzo Ducale of Colorno

The Sanvitale conspiracy (Italian: Congiura dei Sanvitale) was a plot to assassinate Ranuccio I Farnese, Duke of Parma and Piacenza, and members of his family at the baptism of his new-born son Alessandro in 1611. The conspiracy may also be referred to in Italian as the congiura dei feudatari, "conspiracy of the feudal lords", or as the congiura del 1611, "conspiracy of 1611".

The plot was exposed and the conspirators were arrested and tortured. They were found guilty of lèse-majesté and ten of them were publicly executed in Parma on 19 May 1612; the event was called the gran giustizia, or "great justice", and attracted attention throughout Italy and abroad. The gran giustizia brought immediate advantages to the Farnese, who were at the same time rid of troublesome rivals and enriched by the appropriation of their money and lands. However many, including some in powerful foreign courts, believed that the plot had been entirely fabricated by Ranuccio for exactly these purposes. Ranuccio's reputation was seriously and permanently damaged. The question of whether the plot was real or a fabrication is still open.

== Background ==
The Sanvitale conspiracy was the third plot against the Farnese family in the space of seventy years. The first was the successful conspiracy, supported or instigated by Ferrante Gonzaga, of Giovanni Francesco Anguissola, Gianluigi Confalonieri, Agostino Landi and Alessandro, Camillo and Gerolamo Pallavicino to assassinate Pier Luigi Farnese, who was stabbed to death by Anguissola and two hired killers in Piacenza on 10 September 1547. The second was the failed conspiracy of Claudio Landi, Prince of Val di Taro, with Giambattista Anguissola and Giammaria and Cammillo Scotti to assassinate Ottavio Farnese, Duke of Parma in 1582, following which Landi lost the Val di Taro to the Farnese, and the other conspirators lost their heads.

Barbara Sanseverino had been in contention with the Farnese. She was heiress to the fief of Colorno, which her ancestor Roberto Sanseverino, Conte di Caiazzo had received from Francesco Sforza in 1458. She had married on 6 September 1564, in her fifteenth year, Giberto IV Sanvitale, Duke of Sala, and following his death in 1585 had obtained from Ottavio Farnese a decree that allowed her to pass Colorno to their only son Girolamo Sanvitale. In the early 1600s this was contested by Ranuccio Farnese on the grounds that the fief could not pass by maternal succession. He claimed Colorno, and sent troops to occupy it.

== Outcome ==
In the spring of 1611, Alfonso II Sanvitale, count of Fontanellato, was arrested near Reggio Emilia for the murder of his wife Silvia Visdomini. One of his servants, under torture, revealed details of a larger plot against the Farnese. The plan was to use the opportunity of the baptism of Ranuccio's son, where nearly all the family would be gathered, to exterminate the Farnese. These revelations led to the arrest of:

- Count Orazio Simonetta and his wife, Barbara Sanseverino (arrested in February in Parma)
- Pio Torelli, Count Montechiarugolo;
- Gianfrancesco Sanvitale, Lord of Sala Baganza;
- Girolamo Sanvitale, son of Barbara Sanseverino;
- Giambattista Masi, Lord of Felino;
- Girolamo da Correggio, Lord of Rossena
- Teodoro Scotti

All were tortured and gave confessions regarding the plot. Torture included the removal of nails and suspension by scalp hair. By 4 May, 1612, the accused were sentenced by the judge Filiberto Piosasco to public quartering by horses; the duke modified the sentences of the nobility to decapitation. Those not belonging to the aristocracy were condemned to hanging. On 19 May, a scaffold was erected outside the Palazzo Farnese. After the executions, the heads were nailed to the scaffold. The 34 year old Teodoro Scotti had died previously after multiple torture sessions. Over the next few years, additional family members were linked to the conspiracy, and either jailed or executed.
