= Gian Giacomo Teodoro Trivulzio =

Italian Cardinal and Prince

Giovanni (Gian) Giacomo Teodoro Trivulzio (1597 – 3 August 1656) was an Italian Cardinal who held several high functions in service of the Spanish Crown.

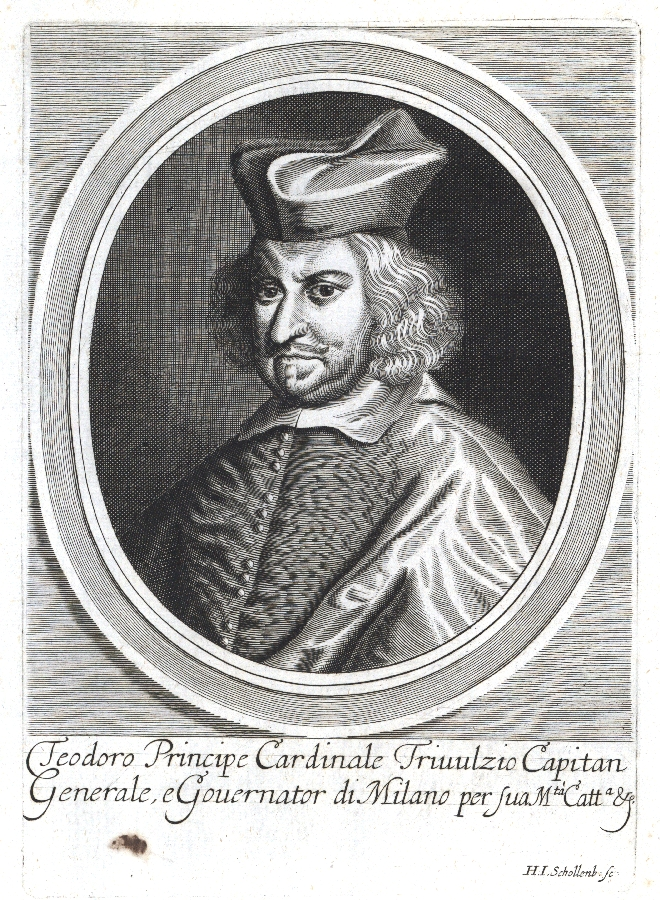
Portrait of Prince Gian Giacomo Teodoro Trivulzio

== Biography ==
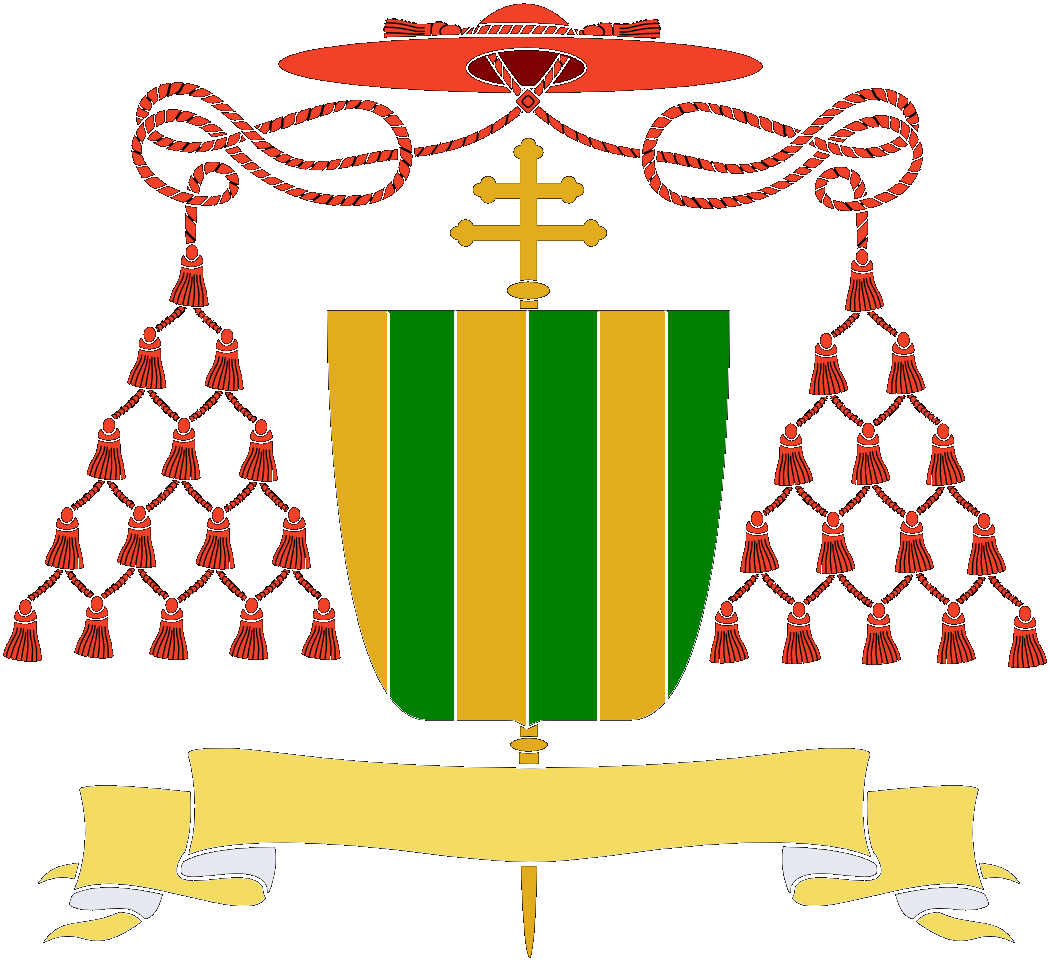
Coat of arms of Cardinal Giacomo Teodoro Trivulzio

Trivulzio was born and died in Milan, Duchy of Milan. He was the son of Carlo Emanuele Teodoro Trivulzio, Count of Melzo, who died when Gian Giacomo was still very young, and Catherina Gonzaga. His sister was Ippolita Trivulzio. In Austria, a 17th-century bronze coin depicting the Cardinal's portrait still exists.

=== Titles ===
According to Sebastián Francisco de Medrano's miscellany Favores de las Musas, dedicated to Trivulzio himself in 1631, the Cardinal's full title is as follows: The Most Eminent and Excellent Lord His Excellency Theodoro Trivulzio Diacono, Cardinal of the Holy Roman Church of the Title of San Crisogono, Legate a latere of the Holy Apostolic See and of our Most Blessed Lord Pope Urban VIII, in the Province of La Marca of Ancona, Vicar General in spiritual, civil, and temporal matters of the Holy Roman Empire, Prince of Misocco and the Misolcino, Count of Melcio and Gorgonzola, Lord of Cotoño and Venzaguelo.

=== Marriage and offspring ===
In 1615, he married Giovanna Maria Grimaldi, daughter of Hercule, Lord of Monaco, and wife Maria Landi.
They had two daughters and one son:

- Ottavia (1618), married Tolomeo II Gallio (1618 - Milan, 28 January 1687), 4th Duke of Alvito, great-grandson of Ottavio Farnese, Duke of Parma, and had issue
- Caterina,
- Ercole Teodoro, Knight of the Order of the Golden Fleece.

=== Career ===
When his wife died in 1620, Gian Giacomo entered the Church. On 19 November 1629, he became a cardinal. In 1642, he became Viceroy of Aragon, and Grandee of Spain.

He participated in the Papal conclave, 1644, which finally chose Pope Innocent X, and in the Papal conclave, 1655, which elected Pope Alexander VII, and where Gian Giacomo as protodeacon gave the Habemus Papam announcement.

Between 1647 and 1649, he was Viceroy of Sicily and between 1649 and 1651 Viceroy of Sardinia. In April 1656, he became interim Governor of the Duchy of Milan, a post he held until his death. He died in Milan on 3 August 1656 and was buried in the family vault in the Santo Stefano church.

== Works ==
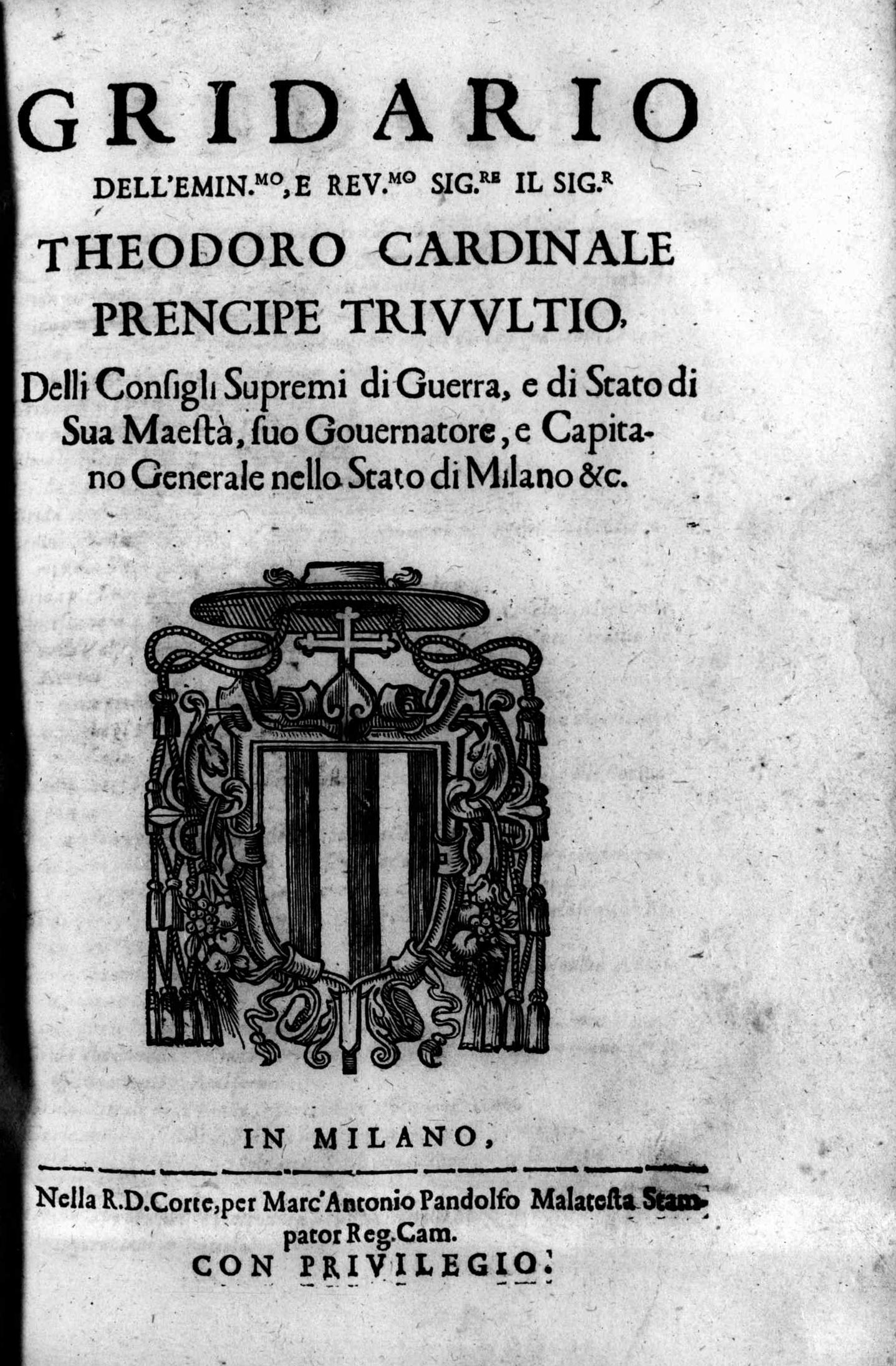
Gridario dell'eminentissimo e reverendissimo signore il signor Theodoro cardinale principe Trivulzio, 1656

- Gridario dell'eminentissimo e reverendissimo signore il signor Theodoro cardinale principe Trivulzio (in Italian). Milano: Marco Antonio Pandolfo Malatesta. 1656.

== Ancestors ==
Ancestors of Gian Giacomo Teodoro Trivulzio

16. Giovanni Fermo Trivulzio
8. Gerolamo Teodoro Trivulzio, Count of Melzo
17. Margherita Valperga
4. Giovanni Giacomo Trivulzio, Count of Melzo
18. Carlo Barbiano, Count of Belgioioso
9. Antonia Barbiano di Belgioioso
19. Caterina Visconti di Saliceto
2. Carlo Emanuele Teodoro Trivulzio, Count of Melzo
20. Paolo Marliani
10. Pietro Antonio Marliani, Count of Busto Arsizio
21. Ippolita Landriani
5. Ottavia Marliani
22. Giovanni Giacomo Rajnoldi
11. Cornelia Rajnoldi
23. Elena Ghillia
1. Gian Giacomo Teodoro Trivulzio
24. Rodolfo Gonzaga, Lord of Castiglione
12. Luigi Alessandro Gonzaga, Lord of Castiglione
25. Caterina Pico della Mirandola
6. Alfonso Gonzaga, Marquis of Castel Goffredo
26. Gian Giacomo Anguissola, Count of Piacenza
13. Caterina Anguissola
27. Angela Tedeschi
3. Caterina Gonzaga
28. Bartolomeo Maggi
14. Cesare Maggi, Count Maggi
29. Francesca Bagarotta
7. Ippolita Maggi
30. Marcantonio dal Verme, Count of Sanguinetto
15. Bianca dal Verme
31. Ippolita Visconti Borromeo

Government offices
Preceded by Enrique de Pimentel y Moscoso	Viceroy of Aragon; 1642–1644	Succeeded by Bernardino Fernández de Velasco, 6th Duke of Frías
Preceded by Vicente de Guzmán	Viceroy of Sicily; 1647–1649	Succeeded by John Joseph of Austria
Preceded by Bernardo Matías de Cervelló	Viceroy of Sardinia; 1649–1651	Succeeded by Duarte Álvarez de Toledo, Count of Oropesa
Preceded by Luis de Benavides Carrillo, Marquis of Caracena	Governor of the Duchy of Milan; April 1656 – August 1656	Succeeded by Alfonso Pérez de Vivero, Count of Fuensaldaña
Catholic Church titles
Preceded by Carlo Gaudenzio Madruzzo	Cardinal-Deacon of San Cesareo in Palatio; 1629–1644	Succeeded by Carlo Rossetti
Preceded by Girolamo Colonna	Cardinal-Deacon of Sant'Eustachio; 1652–1653	Succeeded by Virginio Orsini
