= Ippolita Trivulzio =

Princess of Monaco from 1616 to 1638

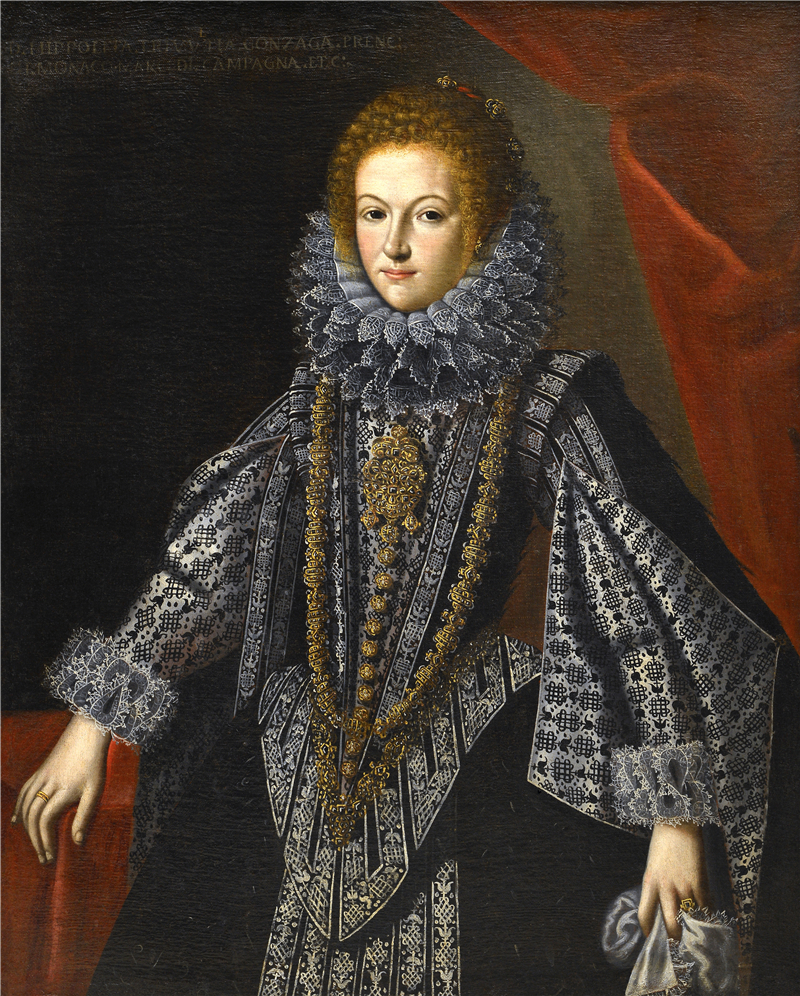

Princess consort of Monaco
- Tenure: 13 February 1616 – 20 June 1638
- Born: 1600; Palazzo Trivulzio, Duchy of Milan
- Died: 20 June 1638 (aged 37–38); Prince's Palace, Monaco
- Spouse: Honoré II of Monaco
- Issue: Prince Ercole, Marquis of Baux
Names
- Ippolita Trivulzio
- House: Grimaldi (by marriage)
- Father: Carlo Emanuele Teodoro Trivulzio
- Mother: Caterina Gonzaga

Ippolita Trivulzio (1600 – 20 June 1638) was the Princess of Monaco by marriage to Honoré II of Monaco, and was the first Monegasque consort to bear the title of Princess.

== Biography ==
Ippolita was the only daughter of Carlo Emanuele Teodoro Trivulzio, Count of Melzo and Caterina of Gonzaga-Castelgoffredo. Her family originated from Milan. Her older brother was Gian Giacomo Teodoro Trivulzio.

Ippolita was brought up in a convent. Her brother married Giovanna Maria Grimaldi, the sister of Honoré II. In 1615, Honoré II returned to Monaco from Milan, where he had spent his childhood with his Spanish maternal uncle, to resume government after having reached his age of majority. Marriage to provide an heir was one of the first political issues to be solved, and Ippolita, being the sister-in-law of his sister Jeanne, was successfully introduced to him as a simple and suitable solution.

She married Honoré II, Prince of Monaco on 13 February 1616. The couple had one son. Ippolita was described as "demure, slim, dark-haired, a potential beauty and raised by nuns." Her spouse was pious, domestic and homely and the marriage was described as a happy one. As Honoré II redecorated the Princely residence from a medieval fortress to a princely palace and introduced several courtly customs and official religious stately ceremonies to create a sense of national and monarchial feelings between the dynasty and the Monegasque population, Ippolita was given a bigger role in public representation than her predecessors." During the years 1624–30, they also hosted the state visits of Archduke Charles of Austria, Maria Anna of Austria and the future Emperor Ferdinand III.

Princess Ippolita died in her thirty-eighth year.

Originally buried in the crypt of the Cathedral of Our Lady Immaculate, she was moved to the apsis of the cathedral on 4 November 1966 by decision of Prince Rainier III.

== Issue ==
1. Ercole Grimaldi, Marquis of Baux (16 December 1623 – 2 August 1651) married Maria Aurelia Spinola (d. 1670) and had issue.

== Ancestors ==
Ancestors of Ippolita Trivulzio

8. Gerolamo Teodoro Trivulzio, Count of Melzo
4. Giovanni Giacomo Trivulzio, Count of Melzo
9. Antonia De Barbiano di Belgioioso
2. Carlo Emanuele Teodoro Trivulzio, Count of Melzo
10. Pietro Antonio Marliani, Count of Busto Arsizio
5. Ottavia Marliani
11. Cornelia Rajnoldi
1. Ippolita Trivulzio
12. Luigi Alessandro Gonzaga, Lord of Castiglione
6. Alfonso Gonzaga, Marquis of Castel Goffredo
13. Caterina Anguissola
3. Caterina Gonzaga
14. Cesare Maggi, Count Maggi
7. Ippolita Maggi
15. Bianca dal Verme

Monegasque royalty
Preceded by Maria Landi (as Lady of Monaco)	Princess consort of Monaco; 13 February 1616–1638	Succeeded by Catherine Charlotte de Gramont
