= Isabella Grimaldi =

- Lady consort of Monaco
- Born: 15??2
- Died: 1583
- Spouse: Honoré I, Lord of Monaco
- Issue: Charles II, Lord of Monaco; François of Monaco; Horace of Monaco; Hercules, Lord of Monaco
- House: Grimaldi
- Father: Giovanni Battista Grimaldi, Lord of Montaudion
- Mother: Maddalena Pallavicini

Isabella Grimaldi (15?? – 1583) was Lady of Monaco by marriage to Honoré I, Lord of Monaco.

Isabella was the daughter of Giovanni Battista Grimaldi, Lord of Montaudion, and Maddalena Pallavicini. She was the niece of Etienne (Stephen) Grimaldi (d. 1561), who was the regent of Honoré I during his minority (1532-1540) and continued to be the de facto ruler of Monaco until his death, and the marriage between Isabella and Honoré I was arranged by Etienne. The marriage took place in 1545. She was widowed in 1581.

== Issue ==
- Charles (26 January 1555 – 17 May 1589)
- François (1557–1586)
- Horace (1558–1559)
- Hercules (24 September 1562 – 21 November 1604)

Isabella Grimaldi Born: 15?? Died: 1583
Preceded by Jeanne de Pontevès-Cabanes	Lady Consort of Monaco; 1545–1581	Succeeded by Maria Landi
