= Honoré I of Monaco =

Lord of Monaco from 1523/32 to 1581

Honoré I, Lord of Monaco
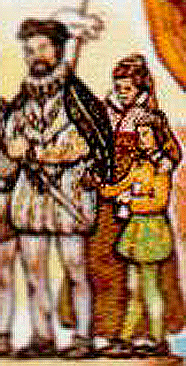
- Honoré I and his family

Lord of Monaco
- Reign: 1523 (de facto) or 1532 (de jure) – 1581
- Predecessor: Lucien (de facto) or Augustine (de jure)
- Successor: Charles II
- Born: 16 December 1522; Monaco
- Died: 7 October 1581 (aged 58); Monaco
- Noble family: Grimaldi
- Spouse: Isabella Grimaldi
- Issue: Charles II, Lord of Monaco; François; Horace; Hercules, Lord of Monaco
- Father: Lucien Grimaldi
- Mother: Jeanne de Pontevès-Cabanes

Honoré I or Onorato I (16 December 1522 – 7 October 1581) was Lord of Monaco from de facto 22 August 1523 or de jure 14 April 1532 to 7 October 1581.

== Life ==
Honoré was the youngest child of Lucien Grimaldi (1487–1523) and Jeanne de Pontevès-Cabanes. He had to become Lord of Monaco at the age of 9 months, upon the assassination of his father on 22 August 1523. A de facto regent, but de jure Lord, was appointed for the young Honoré in the form of his uncle, Augustine Grimaldi (1482–1532).

Under Honoré’s father, Monaco had been a subject of France and its King, Francis I. Augustine Grimaldi severed this relationship, and in the signing of the Treaties of Burgos and Tordesillas (1524), swore Monaco’s allegiance to Spain, and its King, Holy Roman Emperor Charles V. Monaco was therefore a protectorate of Spain, allowing the country to focus more on advancing and less on defending. The alliance with Spain would last until 1641, and weigh heavily on the financial situation of Monaco.

Augustine Grimaldi died on 14 April 1532, while Honoré was still a minor, and another regent was chosen for the young Lord. His aunt Blanche Grimaldi, baronne de Tourette, became regent in co-regency with Nicholas Grimaldi. Nicolas Grimaldi held the position of regent for only 9 days, and Blanche Grimaldi was likewise forced to leave Monaco on 1 July 1532. Étienne (Stephen) Grimaldi (died 1561), from Genoa and known as “the Governor”, was chosen as regent on 23 April 1532.

Etienne remained regent until 16 December 1540, when Honoré reached his majority, and was responsible for restorations made to the Church of St. Nicholas. Etienne remained the de facto ruler of Monaco, with Honoré's blessing, until his death in 1561.

The reign of Honoré I was relatively calm and peaceful, and Honoré was referred to as remarkable for his bravery, wisdom and valour. During Honoré’s reign, extensive renovations and enlargements were made to the Palace of Monaco. Charles V paid a visit to Monaco in 1529, and Pope Paul III visited Monaco, on his way to the Council of Nice, during Honoré’s reign.

== Marriage and children ==
In 1545 he married Isabella Grimaldi (died 1583). The couple had 4 sons;

- Charles (26 January 1555 – 17 May 1589)
- François (1557–1586)
- Horace (1558–1559)
- Hercules (24 September 1562 – 21 November 1604)

== Ancestors ==
Ancestors of Honoré I of Monaco

16. Luca Grimaldi
8. Niccolò Grimaldi
17. Iolanda Grimaldi
4. Lamberto Grimaldi, Lord of Monaco
18. Ceva Doria
9. Sescarina Doria
19. Maria Grimaldi
2. Lucien Grimaldi, Lord of Monaco
20. Giovanni Grimaldi
10. Catalan Grimaldi, Lord of Monaco
21. Pomellina Fregoso
5. Claudine Grimaldi, Lady of Monaco
22. Galeotto I del Carretto, Margrave of Finale
11. Bianca del Carretto
23. Vannina Adorno
1. Honoré I Grimaldi, Lord of Monaco
24. Antoine I de Pontevès, Lord of Cabanes
12. Antoine II de Pontevès, Lord of Cabanes
25. Nicolase de Montfalcon
6. Tanneguy de Pontevès, Lord of Cabanes
26. Antoine Monge
13. Jacquette Monge
27. Marie Quiqueran
3. Jeanne de Pontevès-Cabanes
28. Antoine II de Villeneuve, Lord of Flayosc
14. Louis de Villeneuve, Lord of Flayosc
29. Feliponne de Glandeves
7. Jeanne de Villeneuve
30. Charles de Castillon, Baron of Aubagne
15. Colette de Castillon
31. Madelaine Quiqueran

Preceded by Lucien or Augustine	Lord of Monaco; 1523/32–1581	Succeeded by Charles II
