= Jeanne de Pontevès-Cabanes =

Jeanne de Pontevès-Cabanes (v. 1499 – after 25 May 1555), was Lady of Monaco by marriage to Lucien, Lord of Monaco.

She was the daughter of Tanneguy de Pontevès, Lord of Cabanes, and Jeanne de Villeneuve. The marriage took place on 25 September 1514.

In 1523, Lucien was assassinated by his nephew Bartholomew Doria, who stated that he acted to defend the rights of Marie Grimaldi, daughter of Lucien's brother, who was secured the rights to the throne by Claudine, Lady of Monaco, but whom Lucien had forced to renounce her rights. During the murder, Jeanne and her children were taken captive by the murderers to secure their safety, but they were forced to flee Monaco, and her infant son was placed upon the throne. Jeanne was not allowed to take part of the regency government, but her brother-in-law Augustine Grimaldi was instead appointed regent.

She then married Antoine-Louis de Savoie in 1528.

== Issue ==
- Francesco (born c. 1516; died young)
- Claudine (born c. 1517)
- Lamberto (born c. 1519; died young)
- Rainier (born c. 1521; died young)
- Honoré (1522 – 7 October 1581)

Jeanne de Pontevès-Cabanes Born: 15?? Died: after 1555
Preceded by Antonia of Savoy	Lady Consort of Monaco; 1514–1523	Succeeded by Isabella Grimaldi
