= Borgo Val di Taro =

- Comune
- Comune di Borgotaro
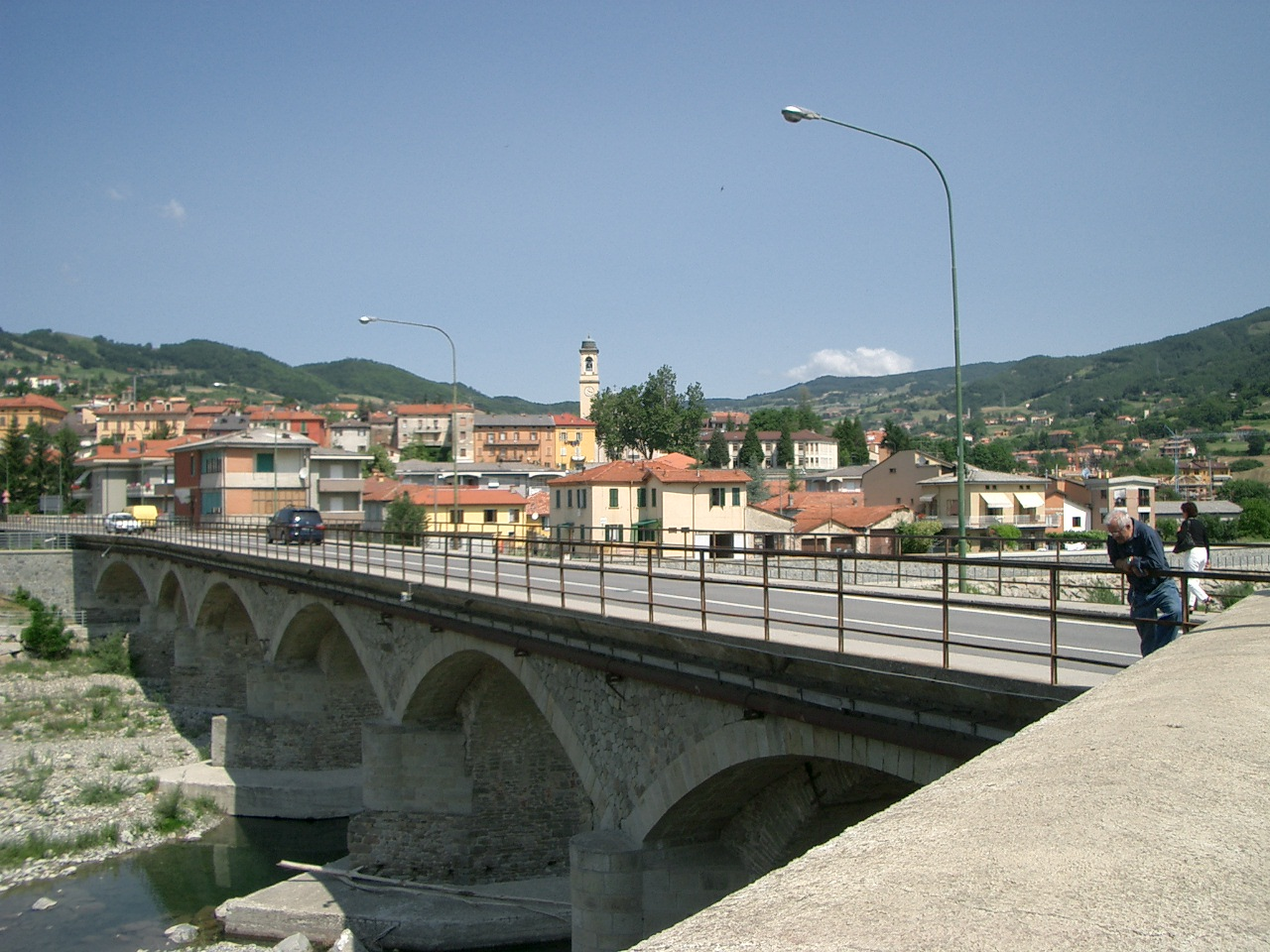

- Coat of arms

- Location within Italy Location within Emilia-Romagna
- Coordinates: 44°29′N 9°46′E
- Country: Italy
- Region: Emilia-Romagna
- Province: Parma (PR)
- Frazioni: see list

Government
  - Mayor: Diego Rossi

Area
  - Total: 152 km^{2} (59 sq mi)
- Elevation: 411 m (1,348 ft)

Population (May 31, 2007)
  - Total: 7,179
  - Density: 47.2/km^{2} (122/sq mi)
- Demonym: Borgotaresi
- Time zone: UTC+1 (CET)
  - Summer (DST): UTC+2 (CEST)
- Postal code: 43043
- Dialing code: 0525
- Website: Official website

Borgo Val di Taro, usually referred to as Borgotaro, (Parmigiano: Borgtär; locally Bùrgu) is a town and comune in Emilia, Italy, in the Province of Parma, 63 kilometres (39 miles) from the city of Parma.

Borgo Val di Taro is an important centre for cattle husbandry in Emilia and it is one of the zones where Parmigiano-Reggiano is produced.

The area is well known for its Boletus edulis (porcini) mushrooms, and several boletes that grow there have IGP (English: PGI) status.

James Gandolfini Sr., father of Italian-American actor James Gandolfini Jr., was born in Borgo Val di Taro.

== Main sights ==
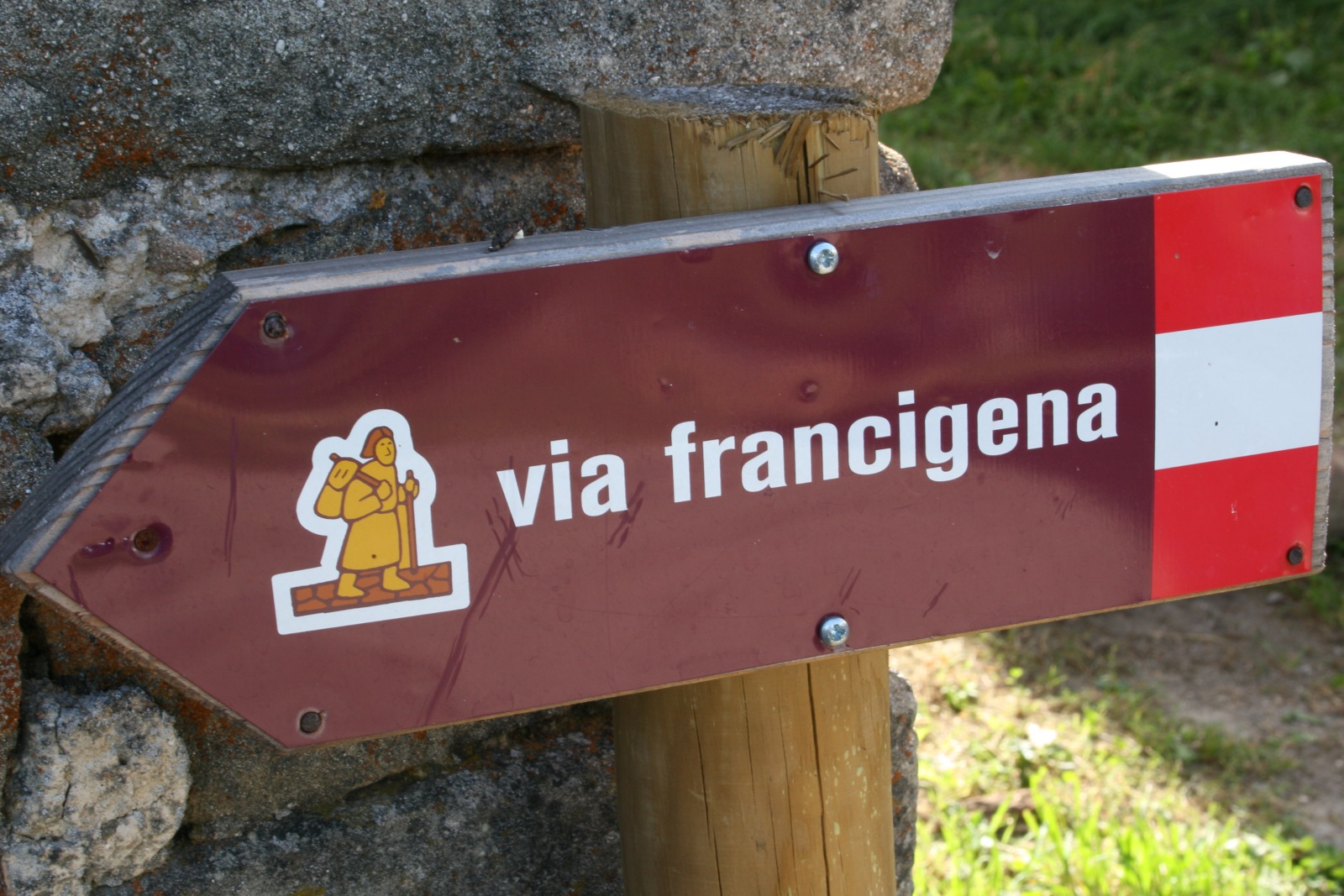
The Via Francigena at Valdena

Not far from the town is the small church of S. Antonio del Viennese, a 13th-century structure in brick. The city hall (palazzo comunale), in the Lombard Gothic style, is a work of the 14th century.

Tourism and gastronomic tours are important factors of the modern economy. The town is a member of the Cittaslow (slow city) movement.

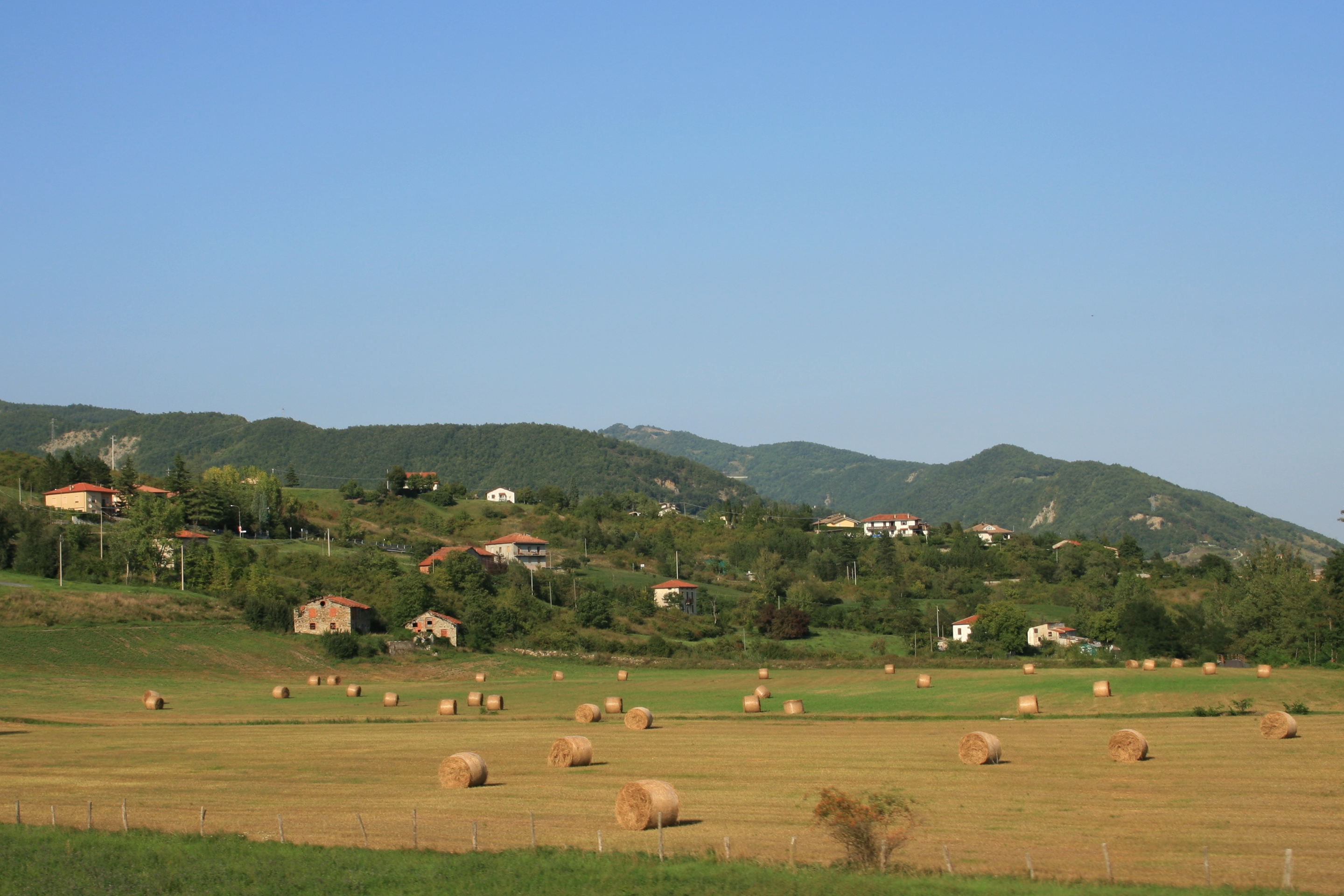
Hay prepared for use as winter cattle feed in the fields around Borgotaro.

== Frazioni ==
Banca, Barca, Barzana di Sotto, Baselica, Belforte, Bissaio, Boceto, Bozzi, Brattesini, Brunelli, Ca' Valesi, Cafaraccia, Capitelli, Caprendino, Case Maroni, Case Scodellino, Case Vighen, Casembola, Casoni, Cavanna, Cianica, Corriago, Costadasi, Frasso, Galla, Ghiare, Giacopazzi, Grifola, Il Mulino, Il Poggio, Laghina, Lavacchielli, Le Spiagge, Magrano, Meda, Monticelli, Ostia Parmense, Poggio, Pontolo, Porcigatone, Pozzo, Roccamurata, Rovinaglia, San Martino, San Pietro, San Vincenzo, Testanello, Tiedoli, Tombone, Valdena, Valleto

== International relations ==
Logo of the Fungo di Borgotaro

=== Twin towns — sister cities ===
Borgo Val di Taro is twinned with:

- Aprica, Italy
- Charenton-le-Pont, France
- Vila de Cruces, Spain
