= Val di Taro =

Valley in Italy

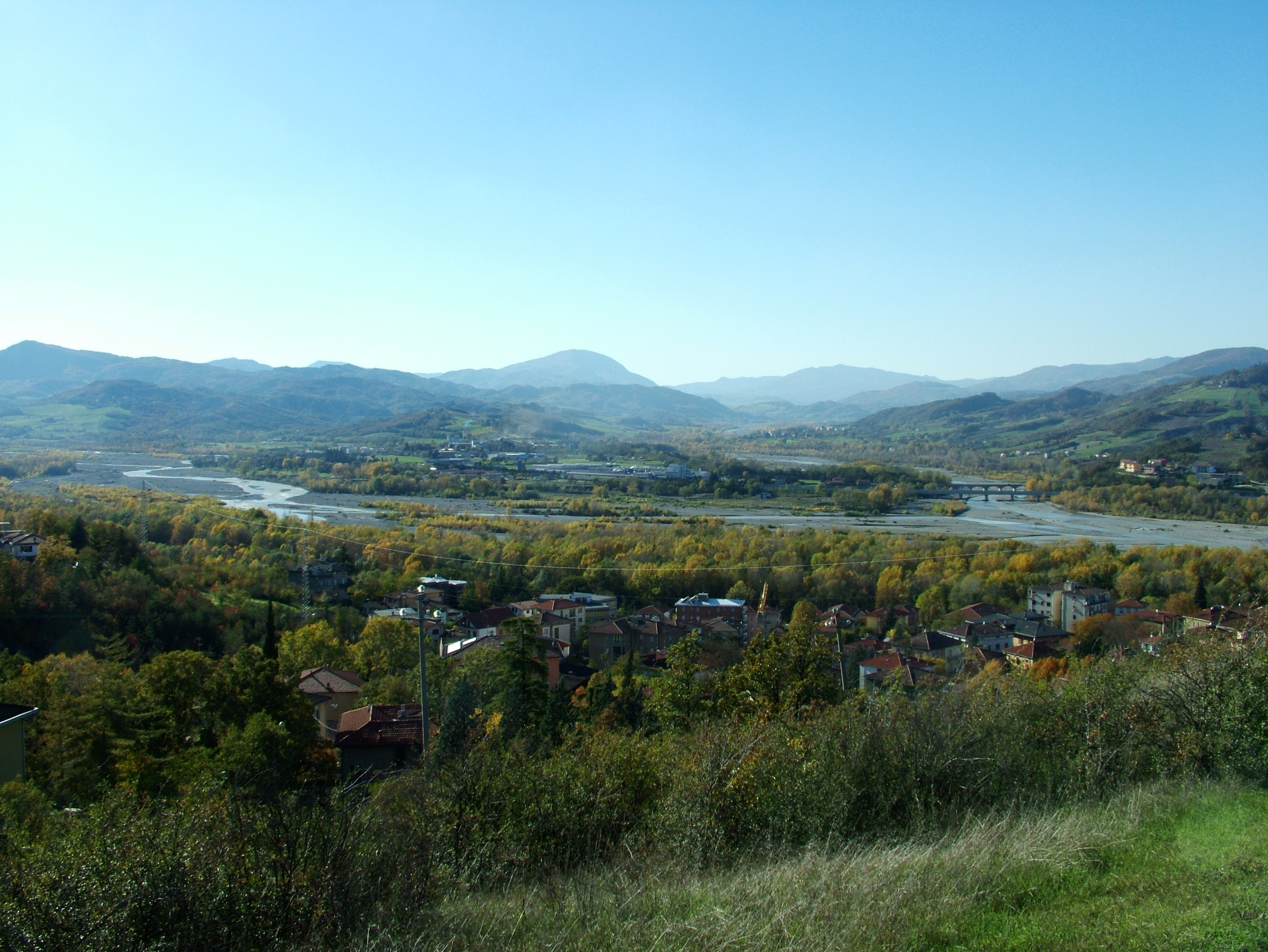
- The Val di Taro at the confluence of the Torrente Ceno and the Taro river (left), with Fornovo di Taro in the foreground.

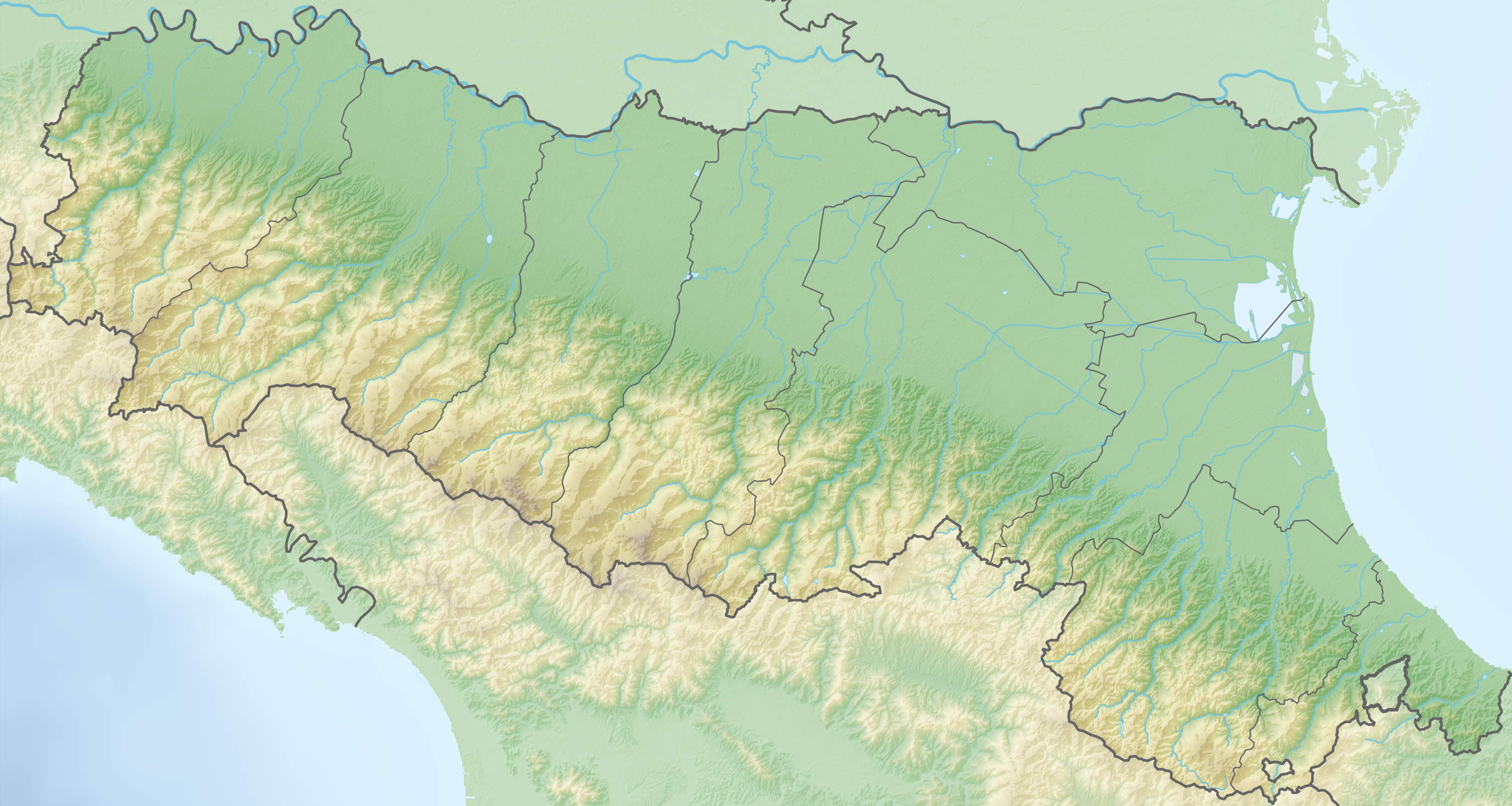
- Location within Emilia-Romagna
- Length: 126 km (78 mi)

Geography
- Location: Comuni of Albareto, Bedonia, Borgo Val di Taro, Compiano, Fornovo di Taro, Solignano, Tornolo and Valmozzola, and parts of Berceto and Terenzo, Borzonasca and Varese Ligure.
- Coordinates: 44°41′N 10°05′E
- Rivers: Taro
- Interactive map of Val di Taro

The Val di Taro is the valley of the Taro river, a tributary of the Po. The valley lies almost entirely in the Province of Parma, in the Emilia-Romagna region of Italy.

== Geography ==
The Val di Taro is approximately 126 km long, and runs from south-west to north-east. The source of the Taro is on Monte Penna, on the border between Emilia-Romagna and Liguria. It runs into the Po at Gramignazzo, a frazione of the comune of Sissa. The valley lies between the Val Baganza to the east, the valley of the Vara and the Valle di Magra to the south and the Valle del Ceno to the west. The Parco fluviale Regionale del Taro, or regional park of the Taro river, lies within it, and extends approximately from Fornovo di Taro to Ponte Taro.

== History ==
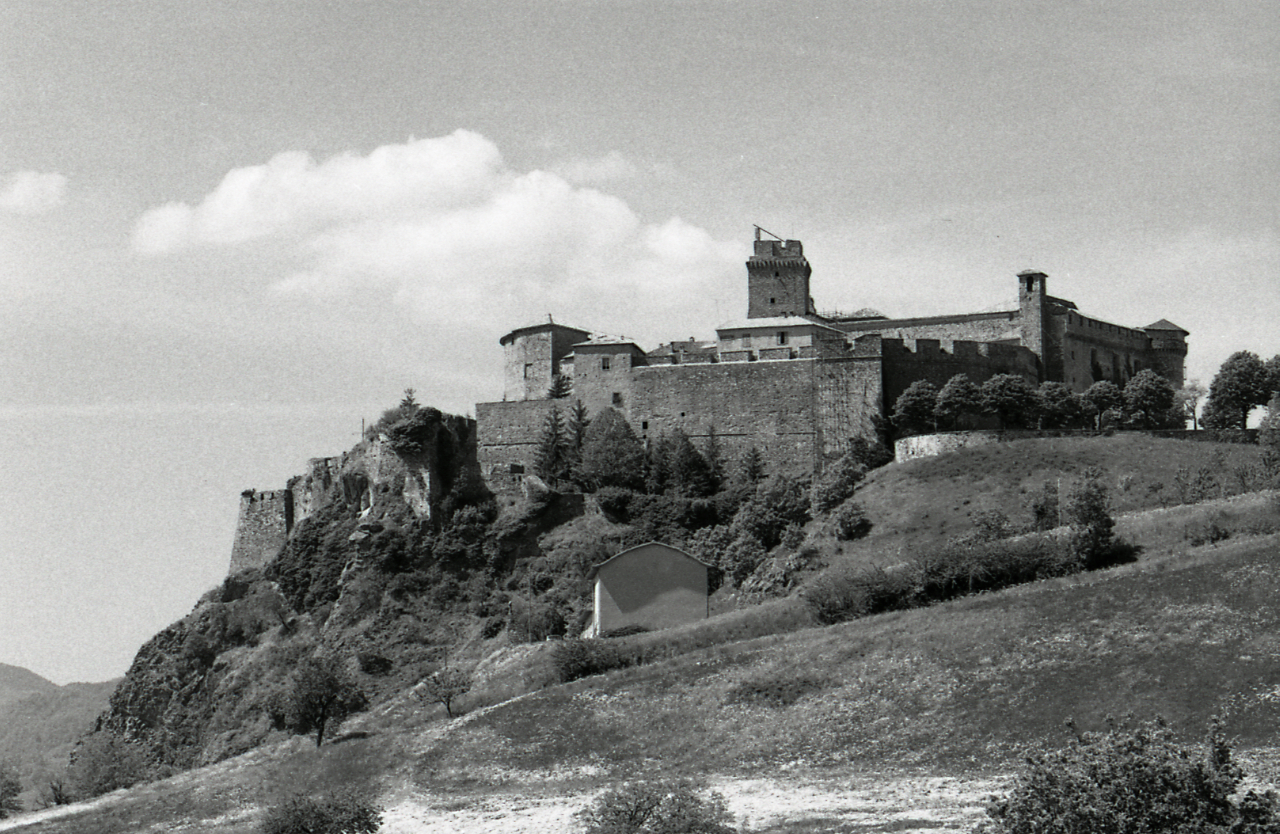
The Castle of Bardi (Paolo Monti, 1976)

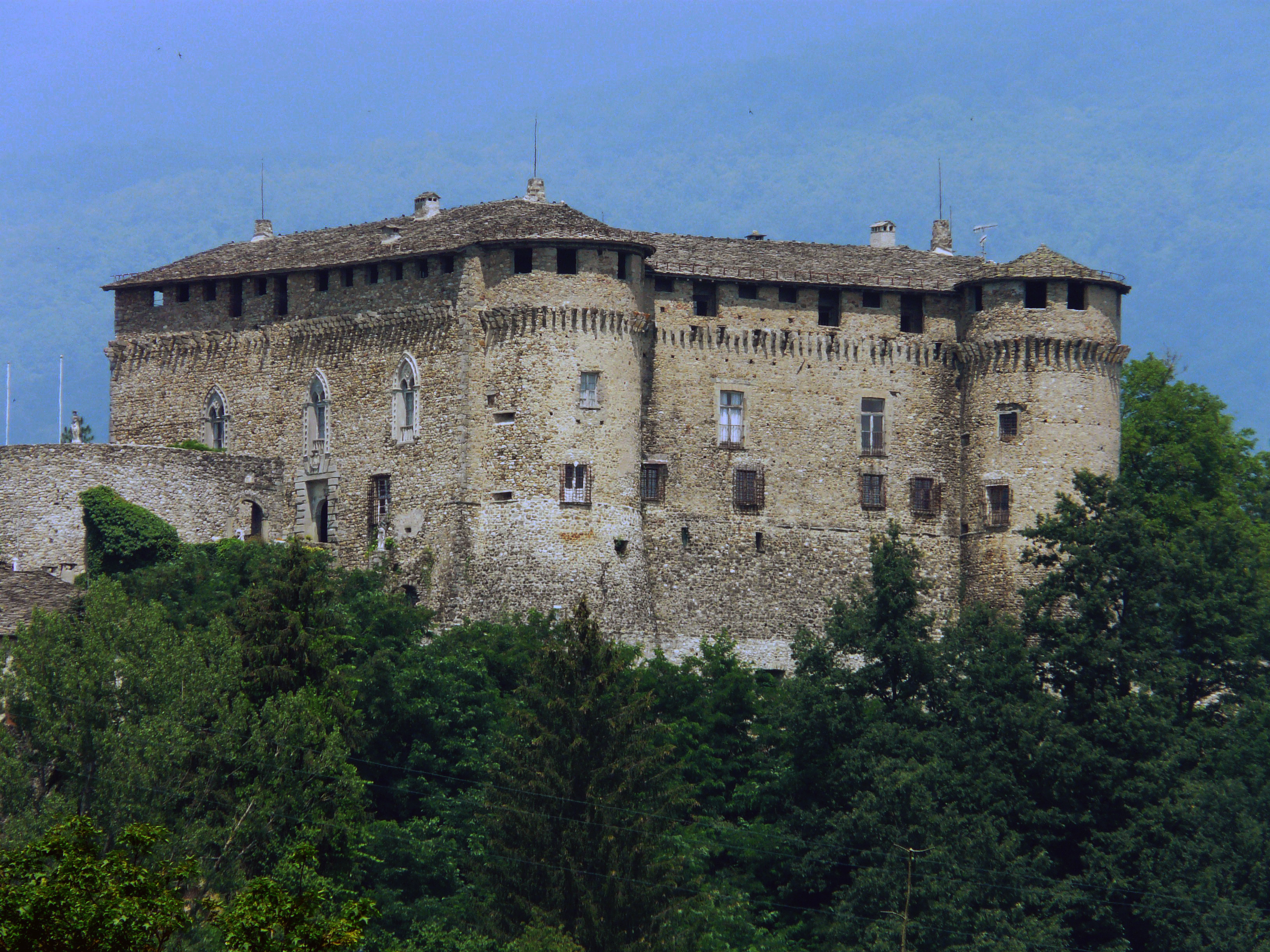
The castle of the Landi family at Compiano

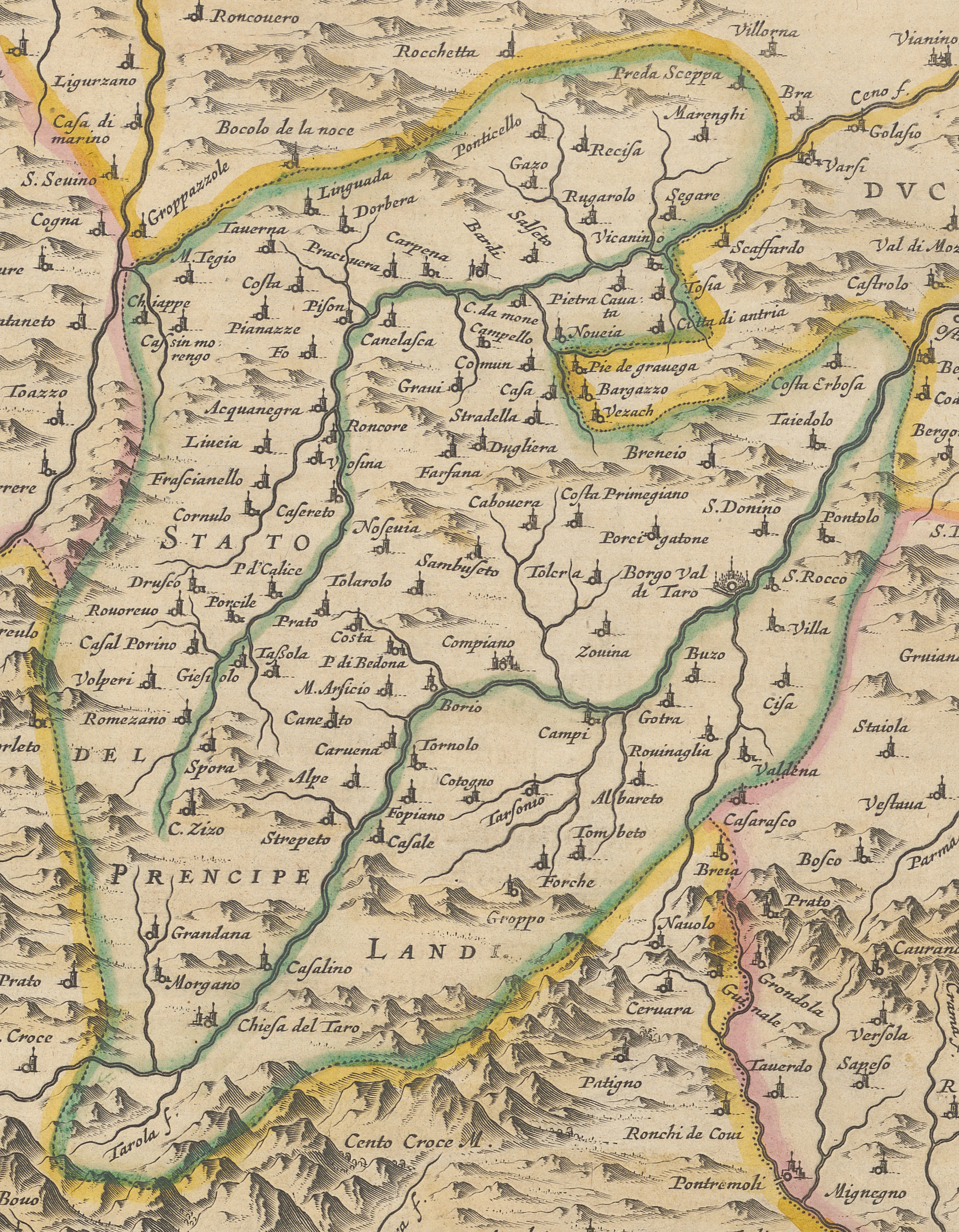
The princely state of the Landi family, princes of Val di Taro; fragment of the map of "Riveiera di Genova di Levante", page 57 of Geographiae blavianae: volumen octavum, quo Italia, quae est Europae liber XVI continentur of Ioannis Blaeu (1662)

The Val di Taro is traversed by the Via Francigena, the ancient road and pilgrim route from Canterbury to Rome, which follows the valley from Noceto to the Passo della Cisa. From mediaeval times most of the Val di Taro was held by the Landi family, princes of Val di Taro. Their castle stands at Compiano.
In the late 16th century their lands passed into the hands of Ottavio Farnese following a failed conspiracy against the Farnese family in 1582, some thirty years before the more famous Sanvitale conspiracy. Claudio Landi, Prince of Val di Taro, plotted with Giambattista Anguissola and Giammaria and Cammillo Scotti to assassinate Farnese, but the plot was discovered; Landi lost the Val di Taro, and the other conspirators lost their heads.
