= Wedding of Albert II of Monaco and Charlene Wittstock =

2011 Monégasque royal wedding

Wedding of Albert II, Prince of Monaco, and Charlene Wittstock
- Albert II and Charlene Wittstock on their wedding day
- Date: 1 July 2011 (civil ceremony); 2 July 2011 (religious ceremony)
- Venue: Prince's Palace of Monaco
- Location: Monaco-Ville, Monaco
- Participants: Albert II, Prince of Monaco; Charlene Wittstock

The wedding of Prince Albert II of Monaco and Charlene Wittstock took place on 1 and 2 July 2011 at the Prince's Palace of Monaco. The groom was the sovereign prince of the Principality of Monaco. The bride was a South African Olympic swimmer. A two-day public holiday for the celebrations was declared.

Commentators said that the wedding would be important for Monaco to survive as a tax haven. Monegasque authorities believed that the event would increase tourism. The civil ceremony was held in the Throne Room, conducted by Philippe Narmino, president of the Council of State, while the religious ceremony took place in the courtyard of the palace, and was presided over by Archbishop Bernard Barsi.

== Engagement announcement ==
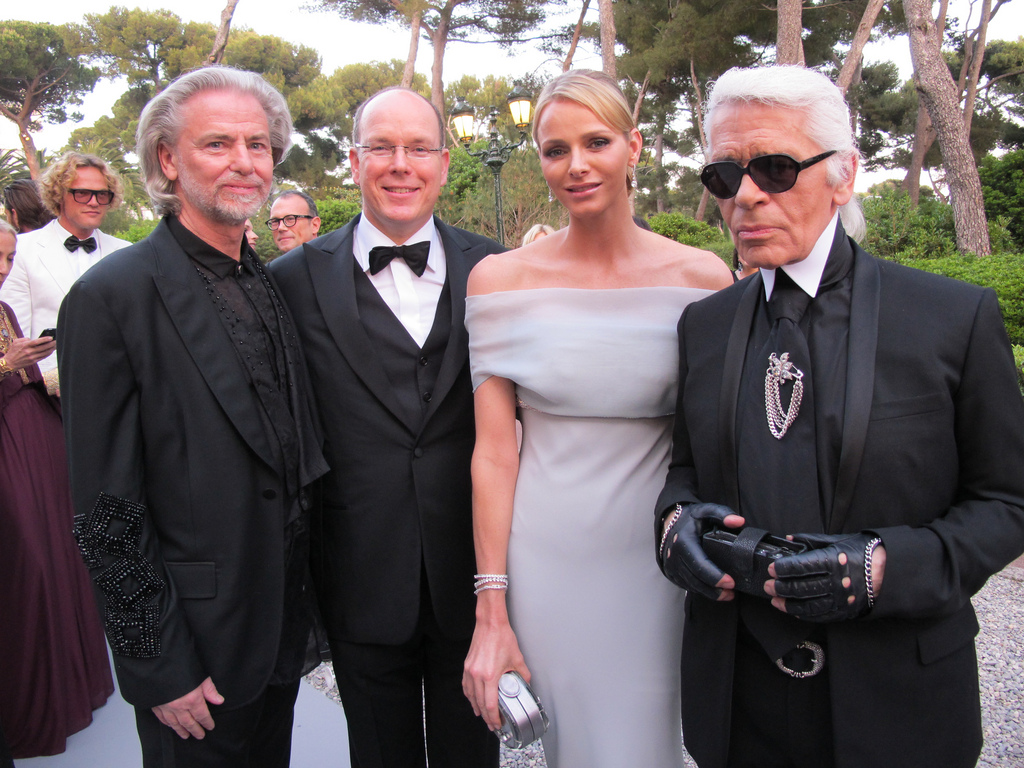
Prince Albert and Wittstock at the "Cinema Against AIDS" Gala with Karl Lagerfeld

Albert II is the current sovereign Prince of Monaco, having succeeded his father, Rainier III, in April 2005. Charlene Wittstock was born in the city of Bulawayo in Zimbabwe, but moved to South Africa with her family when she was 11. She has represented South Africa in swimming, and participated in the 2000 Sydney Olympics. She met Prince Albert at the 2000 Marenostrum International Swimming Meet in Monaco, which he presided over. She retired from swimming in 2007. Prince Albert was also an athlete, competing in bobsleigh in five Olympics. They made their public debut as a couple at the opening ceremony of the 2006 Winter Olympics. The Palace announced their engagement on 23 June 2010. The engagement ring featuring a pear-shaped three-carat diamond at the center and surrounding diamond brilliants.

The wedding was originally scheduled for 8 and 9 July 2011, but was moved forward to prevent a conflict with the International Olympic Committee (IOC) meeting in Durban on 5–9 July, which they both attended. The couple had invited members of the IOC, including president Jacques Rogge, to their wedding. A week before the wedding, the palace denied reports that Wittstock had been getting cold feet. L'Express reported that Wittstock tried to leave Monaco on 28 June, after rumours surfaced that Albert had fathered a third illegitimate child. The palace called the stories "ugly rumours" born out of jealousy.

On the occasion of Prince Albert II of Monaco' marriage to Wittstock, on 1 July 2011 the Stamp Issuing Office of Monaco issue the postage stamp (Block), created by Georgy Shishkin (laureate of competition).

== Wedding ==
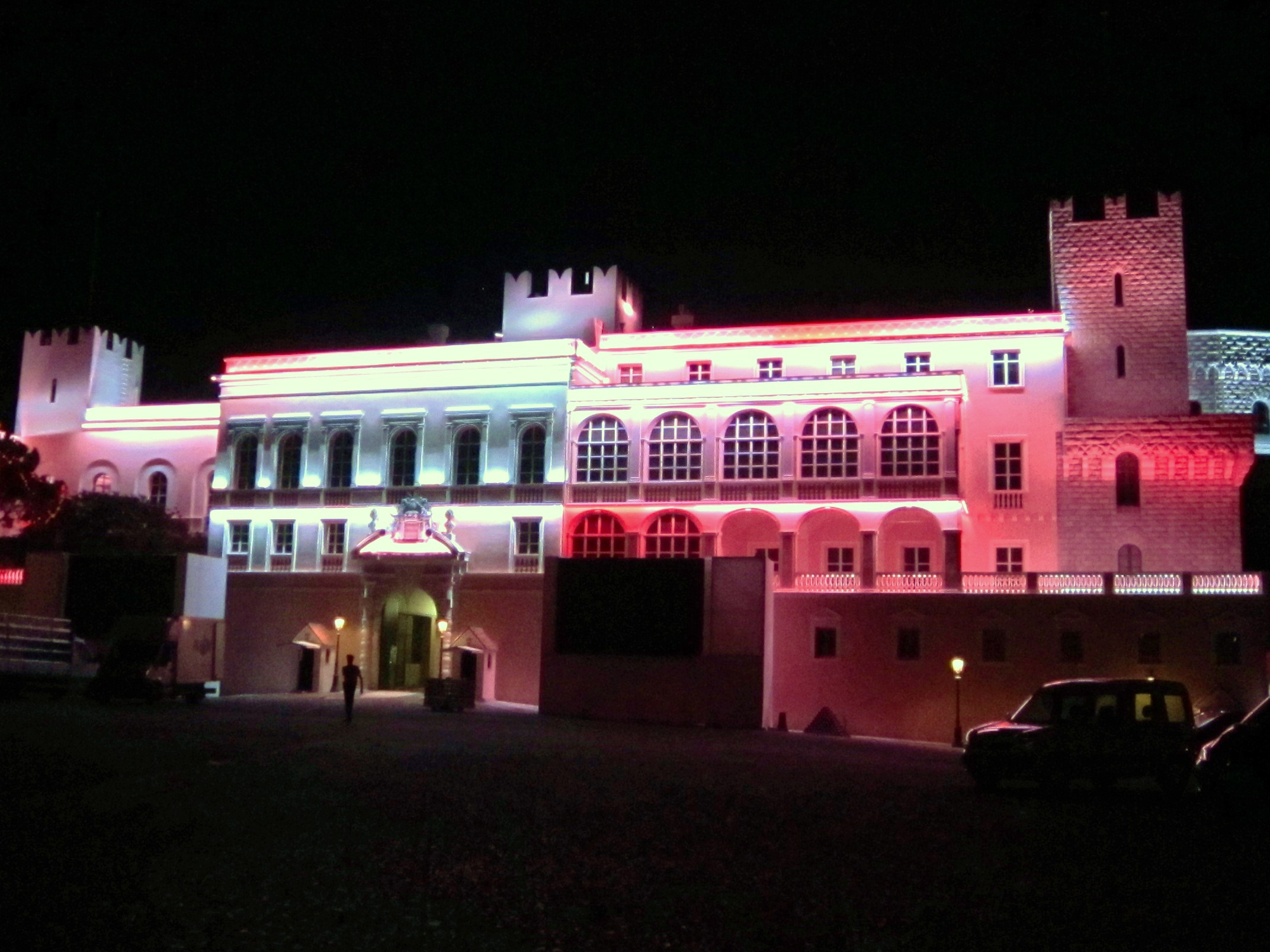
The Prince's Palace, lit up in celebration of the wedding

=== Ceremonies ===
Dual cypher of Prince Albert and Princess Charlene of Monaco

==== Civil ====
Festivities began on the night of 30 June, with a concert at the Stade Louis II by American rock band the Eagles. The concert was attended by 15,000 residents of Monaco and the couple themselves.

The civil ceremony took place on Friday, 1 July 2011, in the Throne Room of the Prince's Palace. The ceremony was conducted by Philippe Narmino, Director of Judicial Services and president of the Council of State. After the confirmation by Narmino, the newlywed couple signed the marriage register with a specially created pen made by Montblanc in gold and precious stone adorned with their cypher. Following the civil ceremony, Wittstock received the formal style Her Serene Highness The Princess of Monaco. The 20-minute ceremony was also attended by Prince Albert's sisters Caroline, Princess of Hanover, and Princess Stéphanie of Monaco. After the ceremony, the couple appeared on the balcony of the Salon des Glaces to salute the crowds. They waved and kissed each other, prompting another round of cheers from the crowd. The couple were also joined by Princesses Caroline and Stéphanie with their children, as well as Charlene's parents and brothers.

They joined the public in the Palace Square for a specially prepared buffet by chefs from South Africa and Monaco, headlined by multiple Michelin-starred chef Alain Ducasse. A free concert was performed by French composer Jean-Michel Jarre and his group at 22:00 hours on the Port Hercules, with an attendance of 100,000 guests. It included a display of lights, lasers and fireworks.

==== Religious ====
The religious ceremony took place the following day in the courtyard of the Palace. Unlike the wedding of Prince Rainier and Princess Grace, the religious ceremony was not held in the cathedral. The ceremony was presided over by the Archbishop of Monaco, Bernard Barsi. The palace gates were open so that up to 3,500 guests could be seated for the ceremony, including seated guests watching giant screens in the palace square outside the gates. Additional display screens were set up throughout the principality. Part of the ceremony was in Afrikaans, a language of Dutch origin and spoken in Charlene's home country of South Africa. After the ceremony, the bride and groom traveled in a bespoke landaulet converted Lexus hybrid car to Sainte-Dévote Chapel, where Princess Charlene offered her bridal bouquet to Saint Devota, the patron saint of Monaco, in accordance with Monegasque tradition.

The dinner reception took place on the terraces of the Opéra de Monte-Carlo, followed by fireworks and the opening of the Opéra Ball. The Monte-Carlo Philharmonic Orchestra and the Opéra Choir performed under the direction of Lawrence Foster. Other performers included Andrea Bocelli, Renée Fleming, Pumeza Matshikiza accompanied by French guitarist Eric Sempe and percussionist Patrick Mendez, Juan Diego Flórez, Lisa Larsson, Wiebke Lehmkuhl, Kenneth Tarver, and Alexander Vinogradov.

=== Wedding attire ===
Wittstock wore a silken blue jacket with ankle-length pants by Chanel to the civil ceremony. Her wedding dress was designed by Giorgio Armani. Lexus was the official car supplier for the wedding. The bride wore diamond earrings by Tabbah at the civil ceremony, while at the religious ceremony, she wore the "Infinite Cascade" necklace designed by Nagib Tabbah, commissioned and made of 18k rose gold set with 1,237 diamonds and 6 pear shaped white pearls.

The bridesmaids were children dressed in the national dress of Monaco. The dresses were designed by Princess Caroline and Jean-Christophe Maillot, the director of the Les Ballets de Monte Carlo. The dresses featured personal touches, such as silk stockings embroidered with the couple's monogram, and aprons that featured both the couple's monogram and the name of the area of Monaco that each girl was from. Each outfit took more than 120 hours to create. The girls were also wearing necklaces of black velvet ribbon with gold crosses given to them by Prince Albert.

=== Wedding party ===
Christopher Levine, cousin of the groom, son of Princess Grace's sister Elizabeth Anne served as the best man, while Donatella Knecht de Massy, the wife of the groom's first cousin once removed, was appointed maid of honour.

== Guests ==
The guest list consists of reigning and non-reigning royalty, other heads of state and government, ambassadors to Monaco from various countries, businessmen, entertainers, fashion designers, models, and sportspersons. The following is a list of notable guests who attended the religious ceremony:

=== Grimaldi family ===
- (Monaco) The Princess and Prince of Hanover, the groom's elder sister and her husband
  - (Monaco) Mr Andrea Casiraghi, the groom's nephew
  - (Monaco) Miss Charlotte Casiraghi, the groom's niece
  - (Monaco) Mr Pierre Casiraghi and Donna Beatrice Borromeo, the groom's nephew and his future wife
  - (Monaco) Princess Alexandra of Hanover, the groom's niece
- Princess Stéphanie of Monaco, the groom's younger sister
  - (Monaco) Mr Louis Ducruet, the groom's nephew
  - (Monaco) Miss Pauline Ducruet, the groom's niece
  - (Monaco) Miss Camille Gottlieb, the groom's niece
- (Monaco) Baron Christian Louis and Baroness Cécile Noghès de Massy, the groom's first cousin and his wife
  - (Monaco) Jonkvrouw Leticia and Jonkheer Thomas of Brouwer, the groom's first cousin, once removed, and her husband
  - (Monaco) Brice Noghès de Massy, the groom's first cousin, once removed
  - (Monaco) Antoine Noghès de Massy, the groom's first cousin, once removed
- (Monaco) Baroness Elisabeth-Anne Noghès de Massy, the groom's first cousin
  - (Monaco) Baron Jean-Léonard and Baroness Susanna Taubert-Natta de Massy, the groom's first cousin, once removed, and his wife
  - (Monaco) Mélanie-Antoinette Costello de Massy, the groom's first cousin, once removed
- (Monaco) Mr Leon Leroy, widower of the groom's first cousin
  - (Monaco) Keith Sébastien and Donatella Knecht de Massy, the groom's first cousin, once removed, and his wife
    - (Monaco) Christine Knecht de Massy, the groom's first cousin, twice removed
    - (Monaco) Alexia Knecht de Massy, the groom's first cousin, twice removed
    - (Monaco) Vittoria Knecht de Massy, the groom's first cousin, twice removed

=== Wittstock family ===
- Michael Wittstock and Lynette Wittstock, the bride's parents
  - Gareth Wittstock, the bride's younger brother
  - Sean Wittstock, the bride's younger brother

=== Foreign royalty ===
==== Members of reigning royal houses ====
- The Crown Prince of Bahrain (representing the King of Bahrain)
- The King and Queen of the Belgians
  - (Belgium) The Duke and Duchess of Brabant
  - (Belgium) The Archduchess and Archduke of Austria-Este
  - Prince Laurent and Princess Claire of Belgium
- The Crown Prince and Crown Princess of Denmark (representing the Queen of Denmark)
  - Prince Joachim and Princess Marie of Denmark
- Prince Faisal bin Al Hussein and Princess Sara Faisal of Jordan (representing the King of Jordan)
- The King of Lesotho
- The Hereditary Prince and Hereditary Princess of Liechtenstein (representing the Prince of Liechtenstein)
- The Grand Duke and Grand Duchess of Luxembourg
  - The Hereditary Grand Duke of Luxembourg
- Princess Lalla Meryem of Morocco (representing the King of Morocco)
- The Prince of Orange and Princess Máxima of the Netherlands (representing the Queen of the Netherlands)
- The Crown Prince and Crown Princess of Norway (representing the King of Norway)
- The Kgosi of Bafokeng, South Africa
- HM The King and HM Queen of Sweden
  - HRH The Crown Princess of Sweden and HRH Prince Daniel, Duke of Västergötland
  - (Sweden) HRH Prince Carl Philip, Duke of Värmland
  - (Sweden) HRH Princess Madeleine, Duchess of Hälsingland and Gästrikland
- Princess Sirivannavari Nariratana of Thailand (representing the King of Thailand)
- The Earl and Countess of Wessex (representing the Queen of the United Kingdom)
- (United Kingdom) Prince and Princess Michael of Kent

==== Members of non-reigning royal houses ====
- The Aga Khan
- The Duke and Duchess of Anjou
- The Margrave and Margravine of Baden
  - The Hereditary Margrave and Hereditary Margrave of Baden
- Prince Leopold and Princess Ursula of Bavaria
- The Duke and Duchess of Braganza
- The Duke and Duchess of Castro
- Princess Virginia of Fürstenberg
- Prince Christian of Hanover
- The Landgrave of Hesse
- Empress Farah of Iran
- The Prince and Princess of Naples
  - The Prince and Princess of Venice
- The Count and Countess of Paris
- The Prince and Princess of Prussia
- The Custodian of the Crown of Romania and Prince Radu of Romania
- Grand Duchess Maria Vladimirovna of Russia
- Grand Duke George Mikhailovich of Russia
- The Crown Prince Alexander and Crown Princess Katherine of Yugoslavia

=== Government and diplomacy ===
- George Abela (President of Malta)
- Maria Luisa Berti and Filippo Tamagnini (Captains Regent of San Marino)
- Ólafur Ragnar Grímsson (President of Iceland)
- (Republic of Ireland) Mary McAleese (President of Ireland)
- Nicolas Sarkozy (President of France)
- Pál Schmitt (President of Hungary)
- Michel Suleiman (President of Lebanon)
- Christian Wulff (President of Germany)
- (European Union) Jose Manuel Barroso (President of the European Commission)
- Marthinus Van Schalkwyk (Minister of Tourism of South Africa)
- Jeff Radebe (Minister of Justice and Constitutional Development of South Africa)
- Angelino Alfano (Minister of Justice of Italy)
- Karlheinz Töchterle (Minister for Science and Research of Austria)
- Salma Ahmed (Ambassador of Kenya to Monaco and France)
- Constantin Chalastanis (Ambassador of Greece to Monaco and France)
- Mirko Galic (Ambassador of Croatia to Monaco and France)
- Kornelios Korneliou (Ambassador of Cyprus to Monaco and France)
- Ulrich Lehner (Ambassador of Switzerland to Monaco and France)
- Marc Lortie (Ambassador of Canada to Monaco and France)
- Lejeune Mbella Mbella (Ambassador of Cameroon to Monaco and France)
- Tomasz Orlowski (Ambassador of Poland to Monaco and France)
- Charles Rivkin (Ambassador of the United States to Monaco and France)
- Missoum Sbih (Ambassador of Algeria to Monaco and France)
- Veronika Stabej (Ambassador of Slovenia to Monaco and France)
- Viraphand Vacharathit (Ambassador of Thailand to Monaco and France)

=== Sports personalities ===
- Thomas Bach (former Olympic Fencer)
- Gerhard Berger (former Formula One racing driver)
- Jonas Björkman (former World Number 4 professional tennis player)
- Sergey Bubka (retired pole vaulter)
- Nadia Comăneci (gymnast)
- Charmaine Crooks (athlete)
- Bob Ctvrtlik (volleyball player)
- Sophie Edington (backstroke and freestyle swimmer)
- Patrice Evra (international footballer)
- Mark Foster (butterfly and freestyle swimmer)
- Frankie Fredericks (former track athlete)
- Graham Hill (swimming coach and former competitive swimmer)
- Jacky Ickx (former racing driver) and Khadja Nin
- Branislav Ivkovic (swimming coach, who trained Wittstock ahead of the 2008 Beijing Olympics)
- Byron Kelleher (rugby union half-back)
- Henri Leconte (former professional tennis player)
- Axel Lund Svindal (World Cup alpine ski racer)
- Julia Mancuso (alpine ski racer)
- Ian McIntosh (rugby union coach)
- Elana Meyer (former long-distance runner)
- Ilie Năstase (former professional tennis player)
- Ryk Neethling (swimmer)
- Terence Parkin (deaf swimmer)
- François Pienaar (former rugby player)
- Nicola Pietrangeli (former tennis player)
- Sarah Poewe (professional swimmer)
- Wayne Riddin (swimming coach and former competitive swimmer)
- Count Jacques Rogge (President of the International Olympic Committee)
- Roland Schoeman (swimmer)
- Sir Jackie Stewart (former racing driver and team owner)
- Jean Todt (President of the FIA) and Michelle Yeoh
- Franziska van Almsick (swimmer)
- Pernilla Wiberg (alpine ski racer, IOC member)

=== Fashion industry ===
- Giorgio Armani
- Roberta Armani
- Terrence Bray
- Naomi Campbell
- Roberto Cavalli
- Inès de La Fressange
- Sébastien Jondeau
- Karolína Kurková
- Tereza Maxová
- Karl Lagerfeld

=== Celebrities and others ===
- Bernard Arnault and Hélène Mercier-Arnault
- Dame Shirley Bassey
- Andrea Bocelli (tenor, multi-instrumentalist and classical crossover artist)
- Bernadette Chirac (former First Lady of France)
- Bernice Coppieters (ballet artist and member of the Les Ballets de Monte Carlo)
- Donna D'Cruz (DJ and model)
- Renée Fleming
- Francisco Flores Pérez (President of El Salvador between 1999 and 2004)
- Juan Diego Flórez (opera tenor)
- Jean-Christophe Maillot (dancer and choreographer)
- Jean-Michel Jarre (musician)
- Pumeza Matshikiza (lyric soprano)
- Sir Roger Moore and Lady Moore
- Guy Laliberté (Canadian entrepreneur, philanthropist, poker player, space tourist and CEO of Cirque du Soleil)
- Yves Piaget (Swiss watch-maker and President of Piaget SA)
- Eric Peugeot (French marketing engineer)
- Bertrand Piccard
- Johann Rupert (South African businessman and chairman of Richemont, VenFin and Remgro)
- Eric Sempe (French guitarist)
- Sonu Shivdasani (Founder and CEO of the Soneva Group)
- Eva Malmstrom Shivdasani (Founder and Creative Director of the Soneva Group)
- Victoria Silvstedt (celebrity, model, actress, singer, and television personality)
- Sir Michael Smurfit
- Umberto Tozzi (pop/rock singer and composer)

== Honeymoon ==
Their honeymoon started out at the International Olympic Committee meeting, in Durban, South Africa, where they stayed in the £4600 a night Presidential Suite of the five star The Oyster Box hotel in Umhlanga, just north of Durban, South Africa. After the meeting was over, they flew to a paparazzi-free honeymoon in Mozambique.
