= Antony Noghès =

Founder of the Monaco Grand Prix

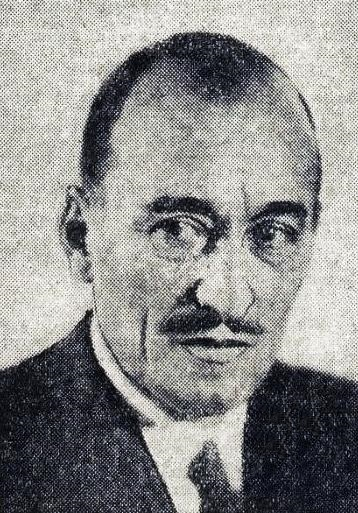
- Born: 13 September 1890; Monaco
- Died: 2 August 1978 (aged 87); Monte Carlo, Monaco
- Known for: Founder of the Monaco Grand Prix; co‑founder of the Rallye Monte Carlo; introduced the checkered flag
- Term: President of ACM, 1940–1953

Antony Noghès (13 September 1890 in Monaco – 2 August 1978 in Monte Carlo, Monaco) was the founder of the Monaco Grand Prix.

He also helped create the Rallye Monte-Carlo in 1911. He suggested the international adoption of the checkered flag to end races. Since 1979, the last turn of the Monaco circuit (the former "Gazometer turn") just before the finish line, has been named "Virage Antony Noghès" after him.

As "Agent general de la Regie des tabacs" he was the Director of the Public administration responsible for the management of the monopoly of procurement, manufacturing, and selling of tobacco in the Principality.

He was the father of Alexandre-Athenase Noghès (who was the father, during his second marriage to Princess Antoinette of Monaco, of Elisabeth-Anne, Christian Louis, and Christine Alix de Massy, and during his first marriage of Lionel Noghès) and Bathilde Livieratos (mother of Marie Livieratos, Hélène Tchomlekdjoglou and Athanase "Tasso" Livieratos). His other son, Gilles, was Monaco's first ambassador to the United States (father of journalist Yann-Antony Noghès).

== See also ==
- 1929 Monaco Grand Prix
