= Franco Borruto =

Italian gynecologist

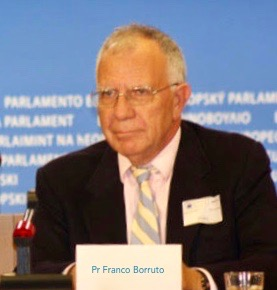
- Born: Reggio Calabria, Italy
- Known for: Gynecology; Human papillomavirus (HPV) research International scientific and cultural diplomacy Founder of the Monaco Baltic States Association
- Awards: Knight (2015) and Officer (2022) of the Ordre des Palmes Académiques; Knight (2015) and Officer (2023) of the Order of Saint-Charles; Honorary Member, Brazilian Federation of Gynecology and Obstetrics

Academic work
- Institutions: University of Verona; Princess Grace Hospital Centre
- Notable works: HPV and Cervical Cancer: Achievements in Prevention and Future Prospects

Franco Borruto is an Italian professor, author and gynecologist who worked in Verona and Monaco and resident for many years in Monte Carlo, Principality of Monaco. His career combines academic medicine with cultural diplomacy and international collaboration, particularly in fostering relations between Monaco and the Baltic States. He is known for his research on cervical cancer prevention, HPV vaccination and gynecology in adolescence. He has performed more than 3,600 gynecological surgical procedures during his career.

== Early life and education ==
Franco Borruto was born in Reggio Calabria, Italy, on 5 October 1948. He studied at the University of Messina and the University of Padua between 1966 and 1972, graduating with an MD on 29 July 1972. He obtained specialist degrees in obstetrics and gynecology (1976) and in anaesthesiology and intensive care (1978).

== Career ==
Earlier in his career, from 1977 to 1980, Borruto worked at the University of Padua. In May 2002, he was appointed Professor of Gynecology and Obstetrics at the University of Verona. Until September 2010 he worked in Verona, serving as Head of the Unit of Pathology and Gynecologic Endocrinology for Adolescents. He later joined the “Ordre des Médecins” of Monaco and from September 2010 to October 2015 worked at the Gynecology Service of the Princess Grace Hospital Centre (CHPG). Since October 2015 he has also been Consultant in health policy and social affairs for the Government of Monaco.

He is the author of more than 500 publications and eight monographs. He is the editor of the book HPV and Cervical cancer (Springer, NY). He has performed more than 3,600 surgical operations and is an honorary member of the Spanish Society of Gynecologic Echography and Prenatal Diagnosis and several international and European scientific societies. He is also a member of Eurogin and the International Papillomavirus Society (IPVS). His work over the last decade has particularly promoted anti-HPV vaccination for adolescents.

== International training ==
Borruto undertook additional training in several international centers, including:

- University of Vienna (1981)
- LMU Munich (1982–1983)
- Harvard University (1983)
- University of Heidelberg (1986)
- University Hospital Nuremberg (1993)

These experiences contributed to his specialization in perinatal medicine and prenatal diagnosis.

== Conferences ==
Between the 1980s and 1990s, Borruto was invited as speaker and committee member at many international congresses, including:

- European Symposium on Pediatric and Adolescent Gynecology (Budapest, 1985)
- International Days of Ultrasound (Rome, 1985)
- European Congress of Perinatal Medicine (Leipzig, 1986)
- International Congress of Gynecologic Oncology (Venice, 1987)
- World Congress of Sexology (Heidelberg, 1987)
- National Congress of Prenatal Diagnosis (Alicante, 1990)
- International Symposium “The Fetus as a Patient” (Barcelona, 1991)

=== International scientific and cultural engagement ===
In the 1980s, while at the University of Padua, Borruto supported initiatives that brought together medical specialists from Eastern and Western Europe at conferences in Venice, which continued for more than two decades.

After the fall of the Berlin Wall, he established links with Lithuania, Latvia and Estonia, encouraging participation in international medical congresses and cultural events. In 2017, he founded the Monaco Baltic States Association (MBSA) to promote scientific and cultural cooperation between Monaco and the Baltic States.

MBSA events have included the Song of the Baltic concert in Monaco in 2017, performed by pianist Mūza Rubackytė under the patronage of Prince Albert II of Monaco, and the 2018 European gynecology congress in Riga, where the Latvian Ministry of Health presented a commemorative plaque to Monaco.

Between 2020 and 2025, despite the COVID-19 pandemic, Borruto continued to promote Baltic–Monaco cooperation through medical missions and cultural exchanges. In March 2025, he participated in the 16th Congress of the European Society of Gynecology in Riga.

== Honours ==
He was made honorary member of the Spanish Association of Prenatal Diagnosis (1989). In June 2015, Borruto was appointed an Honorary Member of the Brazilian Federation of Gynecology and Obstetrics, and in July 2015 was made a Knight of Academic Palms by French Prime Minister Manuel Valls. In November 2015 he was named Knight of Order of Saint Charles by Prince Albert II of Monaco. In April 2017 he was appointed Honorary Member of the College of Obstetrics and Gynecology of Latvia.

In July 2022, he was promoted to Officer of the Ordre des Palmes Académiques, and in November 2023 he was elevated to Officer of the Order of Saint-Charles by Prince Albert II of Monaco.

In March 2026, in recognition of his longstanding contribution to international cooperation and to strengthening ties between Monaco and the Baltic region, he has been awarded the prestigious honorary insignia “Star of Lithuanian Diplomacy”.

== Bibliography ==
- Borruto, Franco; Ridder, Marc De. HPV and Cervical Cancer: Achievements in Prevention and Future Prospects. Springer Science & Business Media. ISBN 978-1-4614-1988-4
- Comparetto, Ciro; Borruto, Franco. Breast Surgery: Indications and Techniques. Nova Science Publishers, Incorporated. ISBN 978-1-5361-3489-6
- Comparetto, Ciro; Epifani, Anna Cristina; Borruto, Franco (April 5, 2017). Adherence to Cervical Cancer Screening in the Migrant Population. KS Omniscriptum Publishing. ISBN 978-3-330-86697-3
- Borruto, Franco. Fetal Ultrasonography. John Wiley and Sons. February 3, 1982. ISBN 978-0471101628

== Selected publications ==
- To prevent and to cure Papillomavirus. Sperling & Kupfer, January 2009. Authors: Franco Borruto and Joseph Monsonego.
- Human Papillomavirus infection: overview. In: Handbook on Human Papillomavirus: Prevalence, detection and management. Smith HB, Ed. Nova Science Publishers, New York, July 2013: 1-137. Authors: Franco Borruto and Ciro Comparetto.
- Historical overview on cervical cancer. Authors: Franco Borruto and Ciro Comparetto. In: Cervical Cancer: Screening Methods, Risk Factors and Treatment Options. Elit L, Ed. Nova Science Publishers, New York, 2013: 245-324.
- Viral infections in Obstetrics and Gynecology. Authors: Franco Borruto and Ciro Comparetto. In: Viral Infections: Causes, Treatment Options and Potential Complications. Shinn D, Ed. Nova Science Publishers, New York, 2014: 1-198.
- Cervical cancer screening: A never-ending developing program. World J Clin Cases 3(7):614-624, July 2015. Authors: Franco Borruto and Ciro Comparetto.
- Uptake of cervical cancer screening among the migrant population of Prato Province, Italy. Comparetto C, Epifani AC, Manca MC, Lachheb A, Bravi S, Cipriani F, Bellomo F, Olivieri S, Fiaschi C, Di Marco L, Nardi V, Spinelli GS, Borruto F. Int J Gynecol Obstet, 2017; 136: 309-314. doi:10.1002/ijgo.12067.
- The State-of-the-Art Therapeutic Human Papillomavirus Vaccine. Comparetto C, Borruto F. In: Horizons in Cancer Research, Volume 67. Watanabe HS, Ed. Nova Science Publishers, New York, 2017: 97-206.
