= Wedding of Rainier III of Monaco and Grace Kelly =

1956 Monégasque royal wedding

Wedding of Rainier III, Prince of Monaco, and Grace Kelly
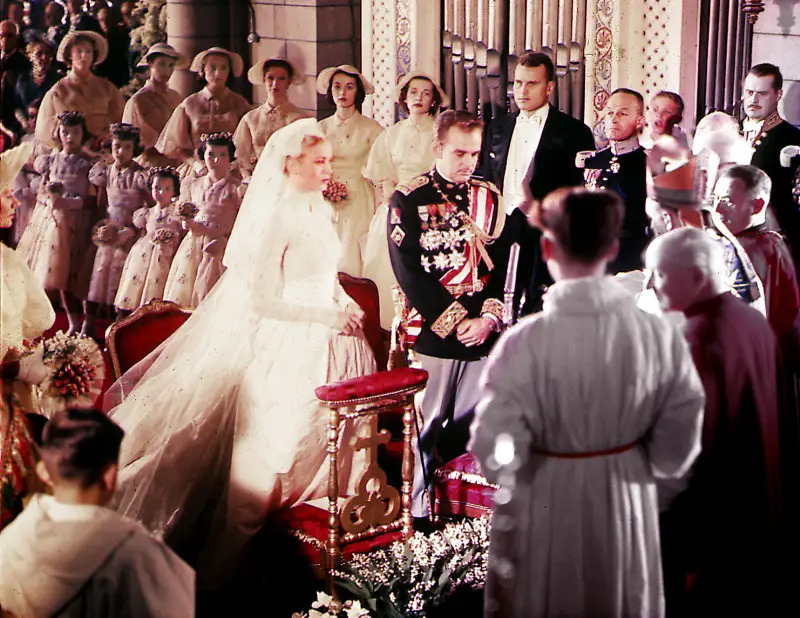
- Grace Kelly and Prince Rainier III during their religious wedding ceremony at Saint Nicholas Cathedral
- Date: 18 April 1956 (civil ceremony); 19 April 1956 (religious ceremony)
- Venue: Prince's Palace of Monaco; Saint Nicholas Cathedral
- Location: Monaco-Ville, Monaco
- Participants: Rainier III of Monaco; Grace Kelly

The wedding of Rainier III of Monaco, and Grace Kelly took place on 18 and 19 April 1956 at the Prince's Palace of Monaco and the Saint Nicholas Cathedral. The groom was the sovereign prince of the Principality of Monaco. The bride was an American film star.

The wedding, which was watched live by over 30 million viewers on black and white television, was broadcast by Télé Monte-Carlo, and relayed to nine television broadcasters in other countries via Eurovision. In addition, Metro-Goldwyn-Mayer Studios filmed the religious ceremony on film and in color, and later distributed it to theaters. The marriage was met with mass attention from the public, described as the "wedding of the century" and the "world's most anticipated wedding" by the media, as well as "the first modern event to generate media overkill" by biographer Robert Lacey.

== Engagement announcement ==
Rainier was, at the time of their engagement, the Prince of Monaco, having ascended the throne in May 1949, while Grace Kelly was an American actress who starred in several significant films in the 1950s, such as Rear Window (1954) with James Stewart and The Country Girl (1954) with Bing Crosby, for which she won the Academy Award for Best Actress.

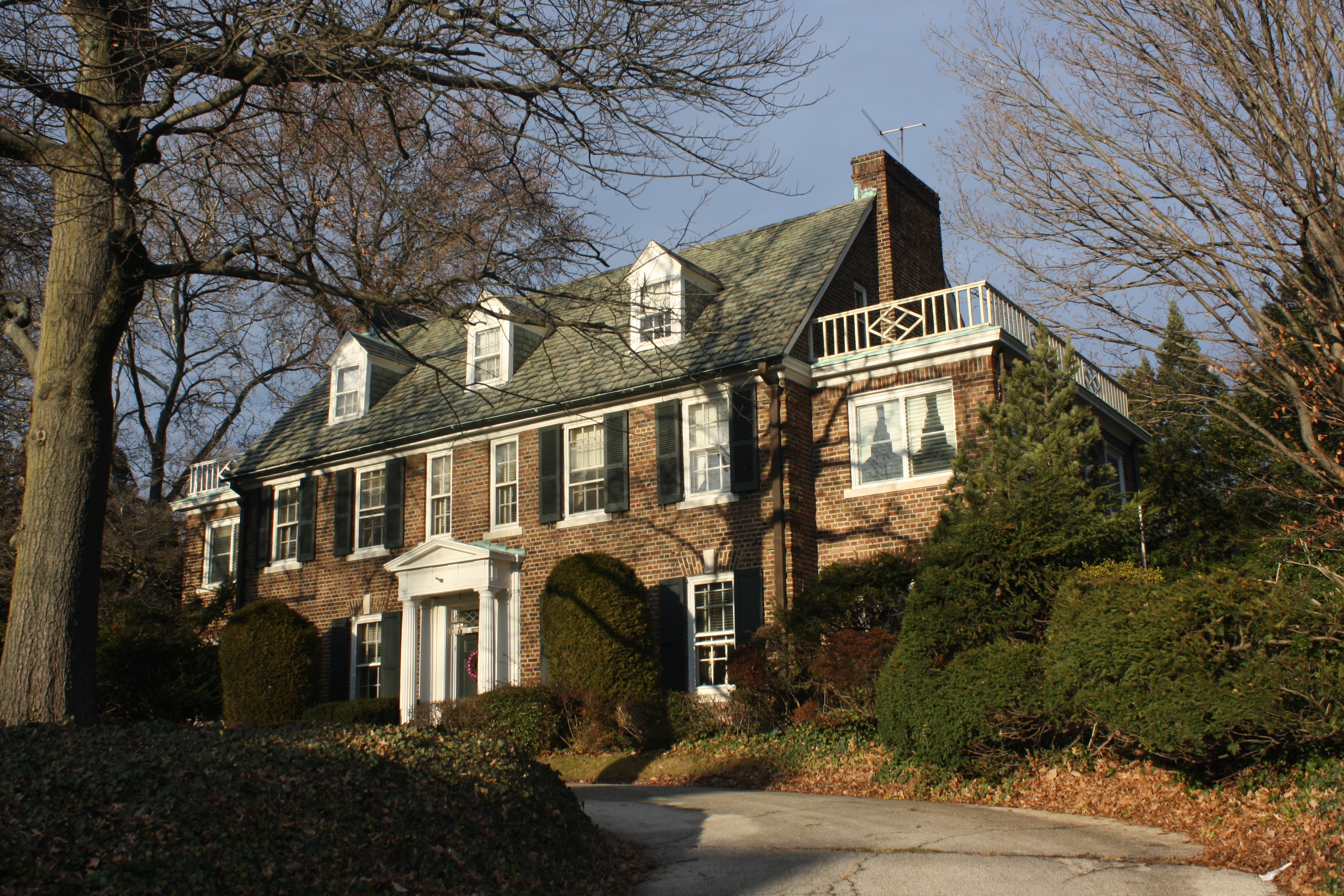
The Kelly Family Home in East Falls, Philadelphia, Pennsylvania, where Rainier proposed to Grace

In April 1955, Kelly was sent by Paramount Studios to promote The Country Girl at the Cannes Film Festival. While on a train to the French Riviera, fellow passenger Olivia de Havilland relayed an offer from her then-husband, Pierre Galante, to escort Kelly to a meeting with the Prince, accompanied by the editor-in-chief of Paris Match, Gaston Bonheur. Initially, she declined, requiring permission of the studio which was sponsoring her trip. A photo session was eventually scheduled at the Prince's Palace of Monaco on May 6, 1955. Due to a power shutoff as a result of a workers' strike in Cannes, Kelly styled herself in a no-iron, wrinkle-free floral McCall's dress pattern, with her still-wet hair in an updo with flowers. Further complications included Kelly's escorting party being involved in a minor car accident, delaying their arrival. Their meeting was photographed at the Palace, with Rainier and Kelly subsequently taking a tour of the residence, which included the private zoo that belonged to the Princely Family. The future couple met once more at a cocktail party in Cannes. She later described the prince as "charming". Kelly was dating French actor Jean-Pierre Aumont at the time of their meeting.

After eight months of correspondence, Rainier proposed to Kelly over Christmas in 1955 at her family home in East Falls, Pennsylvania. Their engagement was announced on January 5, 1956, with the couple participating in a press conference at the Philadelphia Country Club. An announcement party was held at Irisbrook, the home of William Raskob (brother of John J. Raskob), in Wilmington, Delaware. A celebratory ball was later held in their honor at the Waldorf Astoria New York. Kelly's initial engagement ring was fashioned from two family heirlooms, forming intertwining diamond and ruby circlets. Upon the start of filming High Society later that month, Rainier presented her with a second diamond engagement ring made by Cartier to wear during production, in the place of a prop. The second ring featured a 10.5 carat emerald-cut diamond flanked by diamond baguettes. Kelly's family reportedly paid US$2 million in dowry; half came from her inheritance, while the other from her own earnings.

== Wedding ==
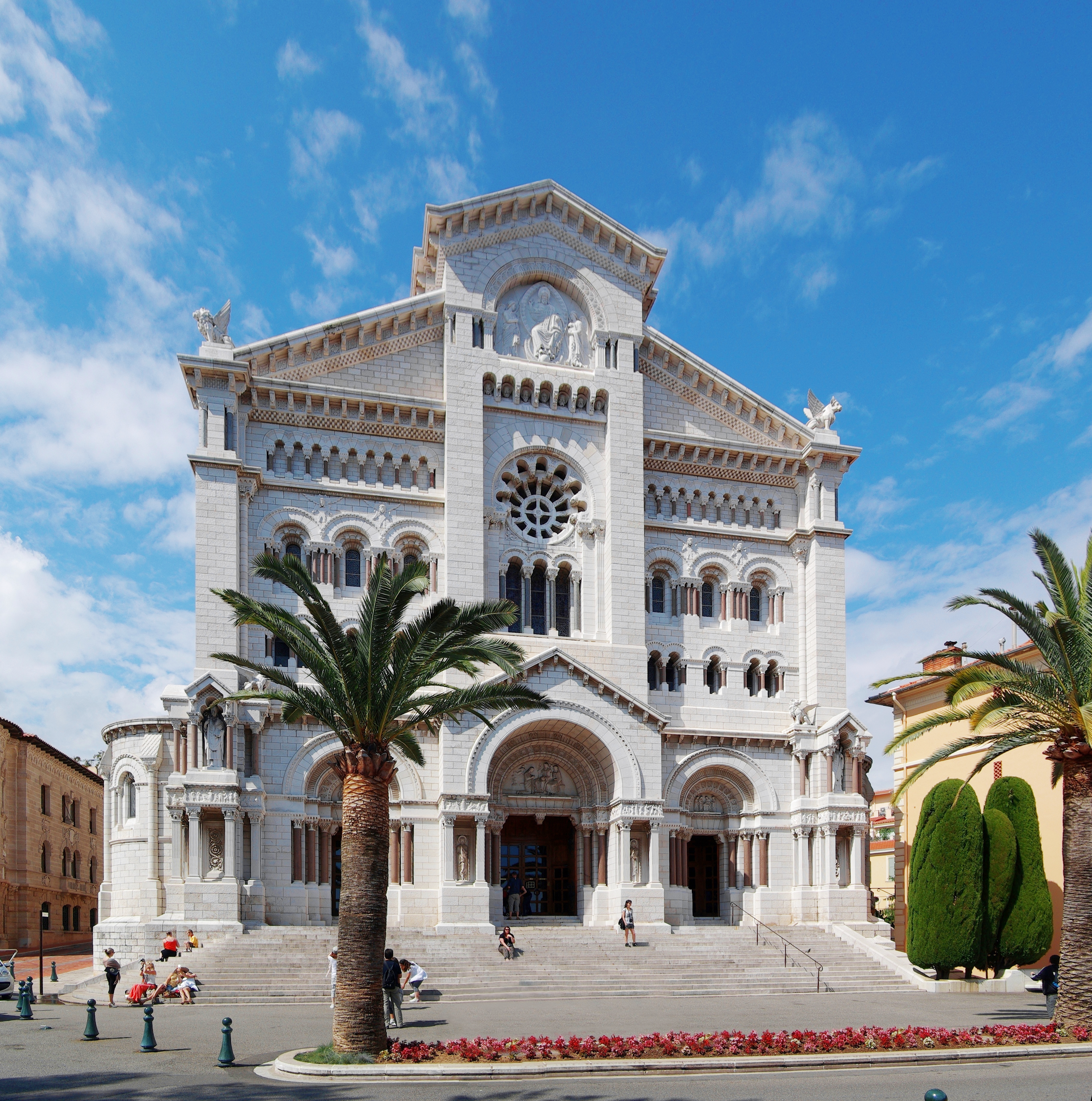
The religious wedding was held at Saint Nicholas Cathedral

Two weeks before her wedding, Kelly sailed from New York to Monaco on the SS Constitution with 65 family and friends, and was greeted by 20,000 Monégasque residents upon arrival. The celebrations attracted 1,500 journalists.

Following the widespread coverage of their engagement, brands such as Max Factor falsely claimed that they would create the cosmetics used on her wedding day, with hosiery-maker Willy's de Mond stating that they would craft custom pearl-trimmed stockings for the bride, both of which were denied by Kelly's representatives. In the week leading up to the wedding, crowds of reporters and fans reached such fervor that the government called in French riot police.

The Napoleonic Code of Monaco required the performance of two ceremonies, with a religious wedding requiring the prerequisite of a legal ceremony. The civil ceremony took place in the throne room of Palace on April 18, 1956, presided over by Marcel Portanier, Monaco's Minister of Justice. The marriage was solemnized in the presence of 80 guests, which included representatives from 24 nations, and finalized with the recitation of the 142 official titles Grace inherited by marriage, in the feminine. The ceremony was followed by a gala, taking place after an evening performance at the Opéra de Monte-Carlo, both of which the couple attended.

On April 19, 1956, the church ceremony was held at the Saint Nicholas Cathedral, with the Solemn Pontifical High Mass conducted in French by the Bishop Gilles Barthe, in the presence of 700 guests. Father John Cartin from Princess Grace's home town parish, St. Bridgets Roman Catholic Church in Philadelphia, Pa, accompanied Princess Grace to Monaco and was her personal priest who accompanied the couple on the altar. The cathedral was decorated with lilies, white lilacs, and snapdragons, hanging from baskets and chandeliers. The altar itself was surrounded by flickering candles. Additionally, guards of honor from visiting warships of the United Kingdom, France, Italy, and the United States were stationed outside of the building. The service began with Grace's arrival, walked down the aisle by her father, Jack Kelly sr., alongside the bridal party. In accordance with Monaco tradition, the groom made his entrance after the bride, with trumpets signaling his arrival. The couple met at the altar, professing their vows and exchanging a single ring before kneeling to pray and receive communion. The newly married Prince and Princess Monaco then departed the church for the reception in a Rolls-Royce, gifted to them by the people of Monaco. A reception at the Hotel de Paris was held for 600 guests and 3,000 Monégasque citizens, with a six-tiered wedding cake replicating the Prince's Palace in sugar, which was cut with Rainier's ceremonial sword.

Both ceremonies were broadcast live by Télé Monte-Carlo in black and white, and were relayed to nine television broadcasters in other countries via Eurovision, attracting over 30 million viewers. In addition, Metro-Goldwyn-Mayer Studios filmed the religious ceremony on film and in color in exchange for Grace's release from her contract, and later distributed it to theaters. The Prince and Princess would later describe the services as "'overwhelming'; with the words 'excited' or 'overjoyed' not enough to express their feelings", according to their son, Prince Albert, in 2017. Rainier later remarked that the celebrations were "the biggest circus in history" and that the couple had "both agreed that we should really have got married in a little chapel in the mountains.”

=== Wedding attire ===
For the civil ceremony, which was held at the baroque throne room of the palace on 18 April 1956, the dress worn by Kelly was made of pale pink taffeta, covered by cream lace, designed as a high-necked, fitted dress with a flared skirt. She accessorized with kid gloves and a matching Juliet cap. Both dresses for the civil and religious ceremonies were designed by Helen Rose. Her wedding dress was worked on for six weeks by three dozen seamstresses. The dress was designed with lacing at the high-necked-collar, with the detail extending to the long sleeves, as well as a fitted waist panel, which gave way to a lengthy, billowing skirt. The dress materials included "twenty-five yards of silk taffeta, one hundred yards of silk net, peau de soie, tulle and 125-year-old Brussels rose point lace." The dress was a wedding gift to Kelly from MGM studio executives. The bride again wore a Juliet cap, which featured seed pearls and orange blossom detailing. The veil was measured with 90 yards of tulle. Other wedding accessories included a bouquet of Lilies of the valley, as well as a missal. The groom wore a military dress of his own design, based on the uniforms of Napoleon Bonaparte.

The bridesmaids' gowns were designed by Joe Allen Hong at Neiman Marcus. The wedding party wore yellow organdy dresses made by the same designer, made in Dallas and created by the boutique Priscilla of Boston. In addition, there were six junior attendants (four girls and two boys) who were dressed in white.

=== Wedding party ===
The bride's sister, Margaret Davis (later Conlin), was matron of honour, with Judy Balaban, Rita Gam, Maree Frisby, Carolyn Scott, Sally Parrish, and Bettina Thompson serving as bridesmaids. The bridegroom's attendants included Count Charles de Polignac, Lieutenant Colonel Ardant, and Jack Kelly Jr., brother of the bride. The child attendants included the bride's nieces, Meg and Mary Lee Davis, as well as the groom's nieces and nephew, Baron Christian, Baroness Christine, and Baroness Elisabeth; and the groom's cousin, Sebastian Von Furstenberg, brother of Prince Egon von Fürstenberg.

== Guests ==
The 700 guests included members of reigning royalty, as well as celebrities and members of the entertainment industry, such as Aristotle Onassis, Cary Grant, David Niven and his wife Hjördis, Gloria Swanson, Ava Gardner, the Aga Khan III, Gloria Guinness, and many others. Frank Sinatra, who was in the midst of a career comeback, was invited, but chose not to attend to prevent outshining the event.

== Honeymoon ==
Prince Rainier and Princess Grace departed after their wedding for a seven-week Mediterranean honeymoon cruise on their yacht, Deo Juvante II. This 147 ft motor yacht had been designed by Charles Ernest Nicholson and built by Camper and Nicholsons in 1928 (Yard number 357) as Motor Yacht Monica. She had been purchased by Aristotle Onassis in 1951, who gave her to the couple as a wedding present.

== Monuments ==
In 2012, the monument to Wedding of Rainier III and Grace Kelly was erected in Yoshkar-Ola, Russia.

== Sources ==
- Taraborrelli, J. Randy (2003). Once Upon a Time: Behind the Fairy Tale of Princess Grace and Prince Rainier. Grand Central Publishing. ISBN 978-0-7595-2790-4.
