= Rainier III Nautical Stadium =

Sports complex in La Condamine, Monaco

Coordinates: 43°44′4.44″N 7°25′19.27″E

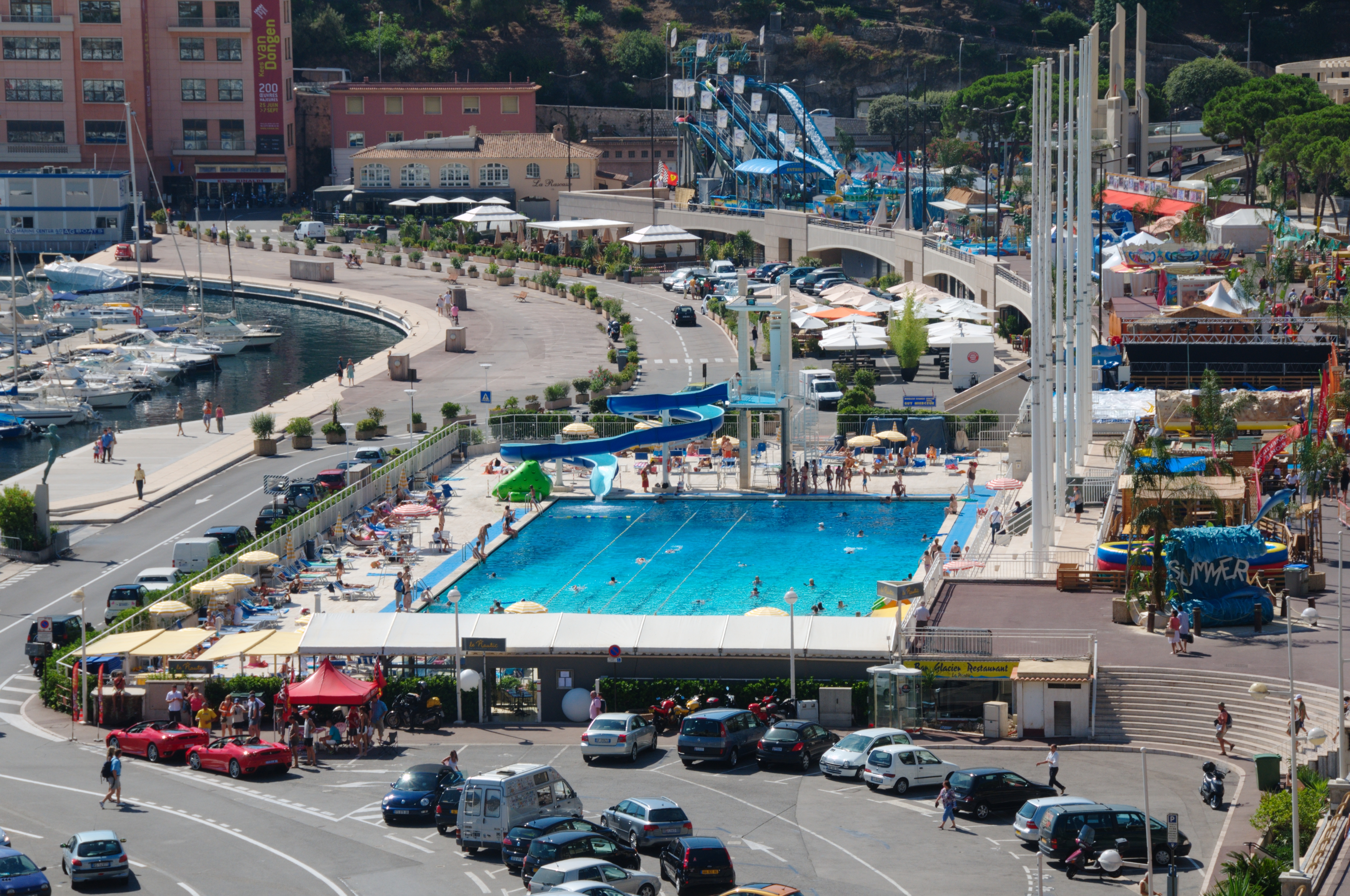
The Rainier III Nautical Stadium

The Rainier III Nautical Stadium (French: Stade Nautique Rainier III) is a municipal sports complex on the Route de la Piscine in the La Condamine district of Monaco, in Port Hercules.

The swimming pool itself originally existed as sectioned off part of the harbour, dating back to at least 1949. However, construction was expanded in 1961, with the addition of a link road and expansion of facilities. The stadium consists of a heated saltwater Olympic-size swimming pool, with 1, 3, 5, and 10m diving platforms, and a 45m slide. The pool is converted into a 1,000m^{2} ice rink from December to March.

The pool gives its name to the "Swimming Pool chicane" (now "Virage Louis Chiron") at the annual Monaco Grand Prix.
