= Monégasque Tennis Federation =

Governing body for tennis in Monaco

Monegasque Tennis Federation
- Sport: Tennis
- Abbreviation: (FMT)
- Founded: 1927
- Affiliation: International Tennis Federation
- Affiliation date: 1928
- President: Melanie-Antoinette de Massy
- Chairman: Jean-Paul Samba
- Secretary: Alain Manigley
- Coach: Guillaume Couillard

Official website
- www.monaco-tennis.com
- (Monaco)

The Monegasque Tennis Federation (French: Fédération Monégasque de Tennis, FMT) is the governing body for tennis in Monaco. It was founded in 1927 and is responsible for organizing, coordinating and promoting tennis in Monaco. The Federation organizes its own national championships and appoints the managers of the Monaco Davis Cup team. FMT is responsible for the organization of the Monte-Carlo Masters every year in April, as well as the Davis Cup matches. The FMT uses the same ranking system as the French Tennis Federation.

== History ==
The Monegasque Lawn Tennis Federation was established on May 21, 1927. The first president was British Consul Major William G.Henley and vice-president Emile Riey. Its objective is to support and co-ordinate tennis clubs in the Principality and encourage relations with foreign federations and clubs.

The Federation is affiliated with the International Tennis Federation since a decision of its general assembly of March 16, 1928. Initially, its affiliation had little chance of succeeding because the Principality had only one club the courts of which were located in French territory. Finally, the request was accepted on declaration of the Monegasque representative according to which there would be three clubs comprising 15 courts in addition to those located in Saint-Roman.

== Organization ==
The FMT brings together four clubs: the Monte-Carlo Country Club, the Monte-Carlo Tennis Club, the International Lawn Tennis Club of Monaco and the Association Sportive de la Sûreté Publique.

The Monte-Carlo Country Club (M.C.C.C.) site has 23 clay courts, 2 indoor courts and 2 hard courts. The facilities offered by the club are used by world famous players such as Novak Djokovic, Milos Raonic, Tomáš Berdych, Marin Čilić, Alexander Zverev, Grigor Dimitrov, David Goffin, Daniil Medvedev, Stéfanos Tsitsipás, Caroline Wozniacki, Petra Kvitová and Svetlana Kuznetsova.

Baroness Elizabeth-Ann de Massy was the president of FMT since 1992 till her death in June 2020. In July 2020 Melanie-Antoinette de Massy, the daughter of the late Elizabeth-Ann de Massy was appointed a new president.

=== Notable members ===
- Benjamin Balleret
- Romain Arneodo
- Hugo Nys
- Lucas Catarina
- Valentin Vacherot

=== Notable former members ===
- Vladimir Landau
- Patrick Landau
- Alexandre-Athenase Noghès
- Bernard Balleret
- Jean-René Lisnard
- Thomas Oger
