= International School of Monaco =

Private school in Monaco

Coordinates: 43°43′59″N 7°25′35″E

The International School of Monaco (ISM) is a co-educational day school located in the Larvotto District of Monaco. The school was founded in 1994 by Neil Phillips, Vincent Hillsdon, Sina Rosberg, Countess Augusta, and Gérard Cohen. As of January 2026, ISM had over 850 students aged 3 to 18 years old, drawn from over 60 nationalities. It is one of seventeen educational establishments located in the country. The school is independent from the Monaco government, unlike other private institutions located in the principality ISM has no contract with them.

== Location History ==
=== Quai Antoine ===
From September 1994 to June 2024, the International School of Monaco was located at 12 Quai Antoine 1er, in Monaco's Condamine District. Over the years at this location, it expanded by acquiring the former Monaco Yacht Club.

=== Testimonio II ===
Since September 2024, the school has been located in the Larvotto district at 43 avenue Princesse Grace, on the ground floor of Testimonio II sky-scraper. This building also contains 61 private residencies, 378 apartments and a nursery.

== Curriculum ==
=== Language ===
In the primary years (Kindergarten to Year 6), the students receive a bilingual education with the curriculum being taught in both French and English.

In the secondary school, (Year 7 to Year 13), the curriculum is taught in English only. From year 7 students take a third language on top of the mandatory French and English lesson.

These language options are:

- Spanish Foreign Language
- German First Language
- Russian First Language
- Italian First Language

As ISM is an international school, unlike all the other Monaco schools, it does not offer Monegasque as a language option.

=== IGCSE ===
Since the opening of the school students have taken International General Certificate of Secondary Education (IGCSE) with Cambridge International Education as their exam board. However, due to the switch to being an International Baccalaureate World Continuum School in September 2024 the last cohort to take this qualification was in May 2025.

=== International Baccalaureate (IB) ===
In September 2024, ISM became an all-through IB World Continuum School. This means that it offers all four International Baccalaureate programmes: the IB Primary Years Programme (PYP), IB Middle Years Programme (MYP), IB Diploma Programme (DP) and IB Career-related Programme (CP). ISM also offers the Extended IB CP pathway, which allows high-performing student-athletes to complete the IB CP over a 3-year period instead of a 2-year period as part of ISM's accreditation as an Athlete Friendly Education Centre (AFEC) from the World Academy of Sport.

== Rankings ==
ISM was featured in the 2026 Spear’s Schools Index as one of the top private schools worldwide and in the 2025 Schools Index by Carfax Education as one of the top private schools in Europe.
