= Marcos Marin =

Brazilian artist

- Born: Marcos Marin; 12 September 1967 (age 58); São Paulo, Brazil
- Education: Alberto Nepomuceno Music Conservatory - VASARELY
- Known for: op art
- Movement: Op art
- Patrons: Pierre Cardin, Vasarely, Stanley Ho and Albert II, Prince of Monaco

Marcos Marin, (born on September 12, 1967) is a Brazilian artist currently residing in Monaco.

His artistic journey began as a virtuoso pianist in São Paulo. However, his passion for visual art led him to France, where he studied music in Angers. During this time, he had a serendipitous encounter with the renowned artist Victor Vasarely while working as an assistant to a printmaker in Montmartre. Marin’s talent and creativity blossomed, and he gained recognition for his distinctive style.

== Biography ==
Born and raised in São Paulo, Marin initially pursued a career as a pianist. Marin came to France to study music in Angers. Marin came into contact with Victor Vasarely while working as an assistant to a printmaker in Montmartre. He met gallerist Delphine Pastor at Art Basel in 2004 where he exhibited a portrait of Grace Kelly at her gallery that was acquired by the New National Museum of Monaco. The portrait was later installed at Princess Grace Hospital in December 2020.

In 2007, under the patronage of Pierre Cardin, he took up a residency at Château de Lacoste. His first project was a series of portraits of classical musicians for Pierre Cardin's Festival de Lacoste.

In 2019, Marin's sculpture of Neymar was unveiled in Paris.
