= Cécile Irène Gelabale =

French socialite (born 1968)

- Born: 1968 (age 57–58); Guadeloupe, France
- Spouse: Baron Christian de Massy (m. 1996; div. 2015)
- Children: Brice Souleyman Gelabale-de Massy; Antoine Alexandre Denis de Massy
- Parents: Denis Gelabale (father); Lucie Darius Denon (mother)

Cécile Irène Gelabale, formerly Baroness Cécile de Massy, (born 1968) is a French-Monegasque socialite and philanthropist. She serves as the president of Ladies Lunch Monte-Carlo and as vice president of the Monegasque Federation of Contact Sports and Associated Disciplines. She is an ex-wife of Baron Christian de Massy who is a member of the House of Grimaldi. Throughout her marriage she was known as Baroness Cécile de Massy, but upon divorce was required to give up the title and retain her maiden name.

== Biography ==
Gelabale was born in 1968 in Guadeloupe, an overseas region of France in the Caribbean, to Denis Gelabale and Lucie Darius Denon.

Gelabale is the fourth ex-wife of Baron Christian de Massy, the son of Princess Antoinette, Baroness of Massy. She and Baron Christian de Massy married in 1996. She gave birth to a son, Antoine Alexandre Denis de Massy (15 January 1997 – 25 October 2026). She also has a son from a previous relationship who was legally adopted by Baron de Massy, Brice Souleyman Gelabale-de Massy (born in Les Abymes on 2 November 1987).

After a six-year separation, she and Christian de Massy made their divorce final in 2015. Gelabale started going by her maiden name even before the divorce was finalized.

In 2005, Gelabale founded Ladies Lunch Monte-Carlo, a charitable organisation focused on improving the quality of life for children and adolescents in Monaco. She currently serves as the organisation's president. She also serves as an honorary committee member and Vice President of the Monegasque Federation of Contact Sports and Associated Disciplines and the International Academy of Self-Defense and Combat Sports of Monaco. In 2013 she co-directed the first Monte Carlo Fighting Masters, sponsored by the International Academy.
