= Tabbah =

Jewellery company founded in 1862

- Type: Family business
- Industry: Jewellery manufacturing; Watchmaking; Retailing
- Founded: Beirut, Lebanon (1862; 164 years ago)
- Founder: Joseph Tabbah
- Headquarters: Geneva, Switzerland
- Area served: International
- Key people: Nagib Tabbah, CEO
- Website: www.tabbah.com

Tabbah is a bespoke jewelry company that was founded in 1862 and now is a family business owned and run by Nabil and Nagib Tabbah.

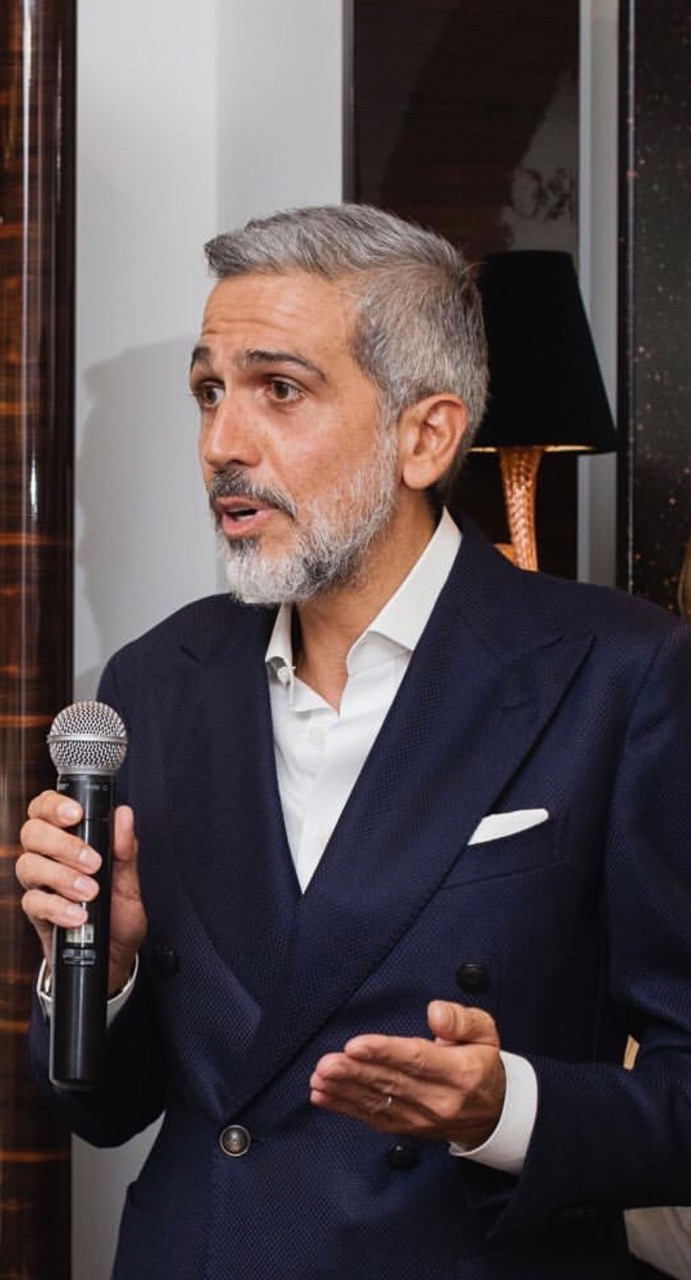
Tabbah CEO and jewelry designer Nagib Tabbah giving a public lecture at an exhibition of Maison Tabbah.

The company has made jewelry for the Wedding of Albert II, Prince of Monaco, and Charlene Wittstock. Tabbah's international clientele during its over 150-year history include Ginger Rogers, Shirley Bassey, Elton John, Ibn Saud, Mouna Ayoub and Brooke Shields.

During the 17th century, Tabbah started as a printer of patterned silk, and the jewelry house was later founded in 1862 in Beirut by Joseph Tabbah.

== Nagib Tabbah ==
Nagib Tabbah is the chief designer and CEO of Tabbah. He is the great, great-grandson of Joseph Tabbah, the founder of the House of Tabbah. His family moved to Monaco in 1974. Nagib Tabbah was raised, spending time in the family's boutique atelier. He graduated from the Gemological Institute of America in 1991. Afterwards he joined the family headquarters in Switzerland and returned to Beirut in 1997.

Nagib Tabbah designed the "Infinite Cascade" necklace for Charlene, Princess of Monaco for her wedding with Albert II, Prince of Monaco in 2011. The necklace is made of 18k rose gold set with 1,237 diamonds and 6 pear shaped white pearls.

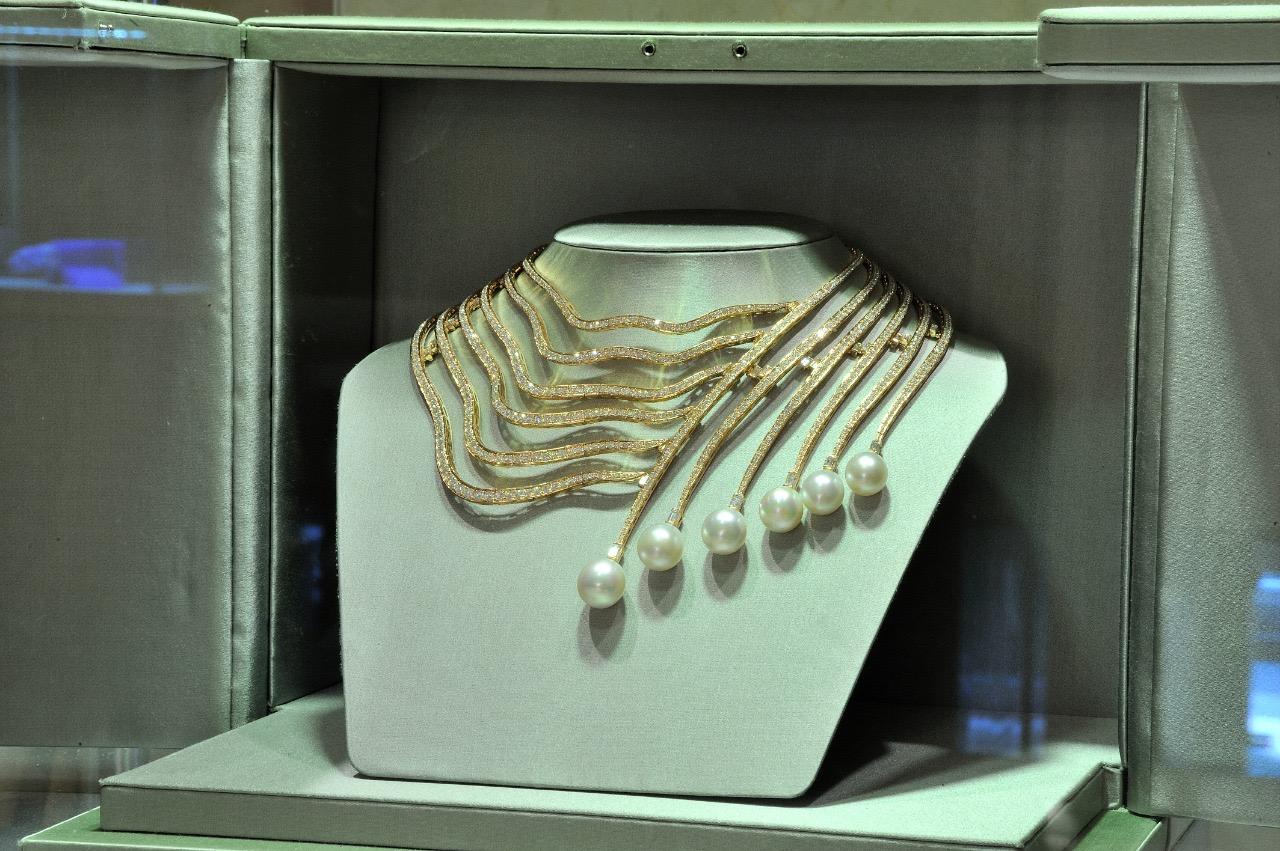
Maison Tabbah necklace with pearls and diamonds commissioned by Charlene, Princess of Monaco.

== Boutiques ==
House of Tabbah boutique opened in Beirut, Lebanon on Allenby Street in 2014. More recently, Tabbah has expanded with points of sale in Paris, Geneva, London and Saks Fifth Avenue in New York City and Beverly Hills.
