= La Condamine =

La Condamine A Cundàmina (Monégasque)
- Ward of Monaco
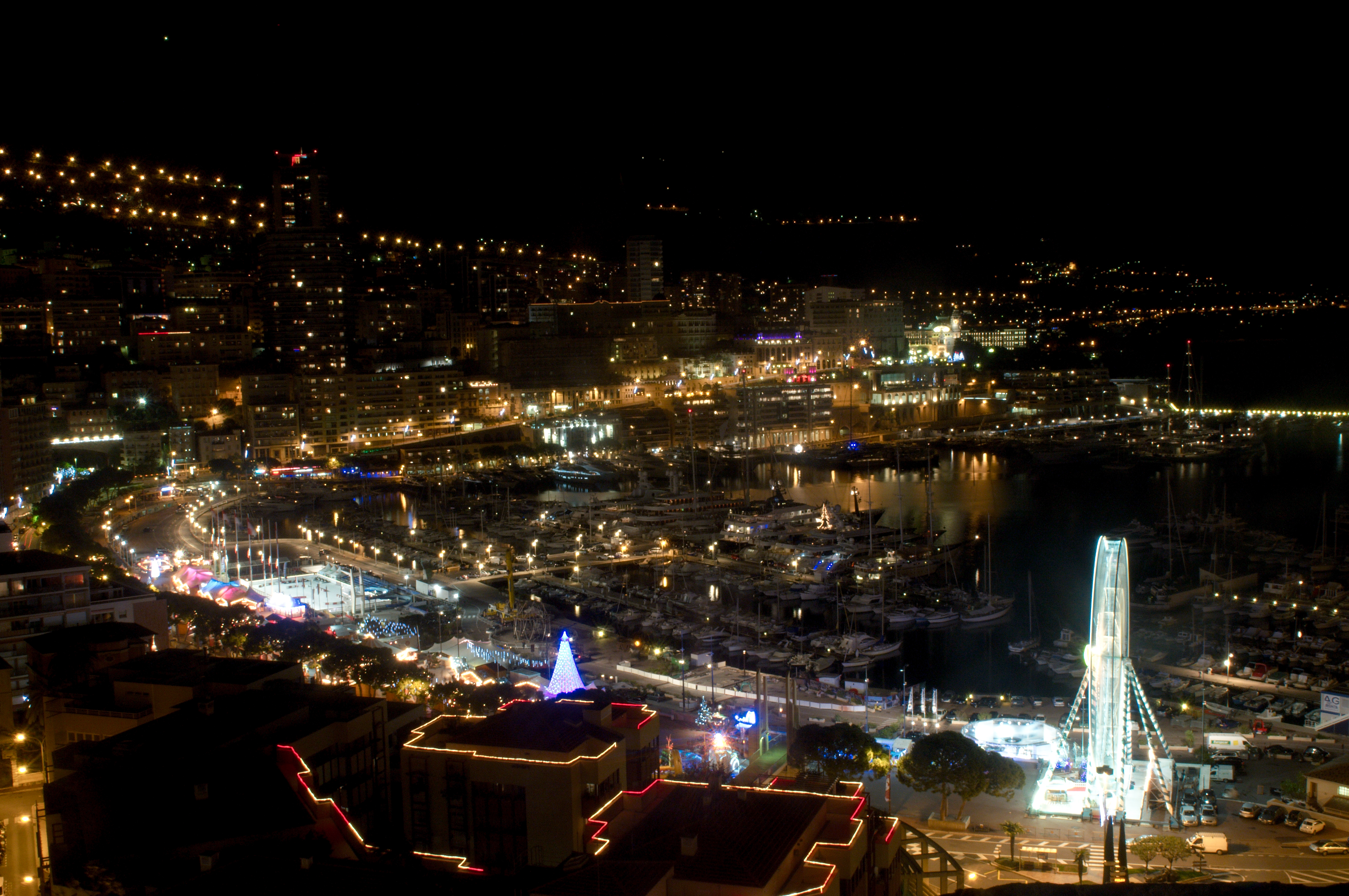
- Port Hercule, La Condamine

- Location in Monaco
- Coordinates: 43°44′4″N 7°25′15″E
- Country: Monaco

Area
  - Land: 29.5843 ha (73.104 acres)

Population (2008)
  - Total: 3,694
  - Density: 12,502/km^{2} (32,380/sq mi)

La Condamine (French pronunciation: [la kɔ̃damin]; Monégasque: A Cundàmina [a kuŋˈdamina]) is the central ward and a quartier in the Principality of Monaco. The quartier's landmarks include Port Hercules, the Rainier III Nautical Stadium, and the Princess Antoinette Park. Its farmers' market, at Place d'Armes, has been held since 1880.

== Toponymy ==
Its current name comes from the vulgar Latin *condominium that designated in the Middle Ages a land, near the castle, reserved for the feudal lord and exempt from taxes, or sometimes a land subject to two lords at the same time.

== History ==
The Monegasque constitution of 1911 created three communes: La Condamine was then one of the three communes of the Principality. It is there that Fernand Forest (fr) died in 1914. A single commune was re-established in 1918.

=== Legends ===
Saint Devote was martyred in Corsica in the 3rd century. According to tradition, the boat that was to carry her body to the African land was caught in a storm; a dove then guided her to the European shore and landed in Monaco. In the Middle Ages, the relics of the saint were stolen and taken away by boat. When the criminals were caught, their boat was burned. This is the origin of the ceremony which is celebrated on 26 January each year and during which a boat is burnt on the square in front of the votive church. The next day an imposing procession takes place.

== Geography ==
The district occupies a small valley which was crossed by the railway viaduct (today the railway passes through a tunnel) which has become a road linking the district and Monte Carlo.

== Overview ==
Condamine dates from the Middle Ages, and means cultivable land. It is the second oldest area of Monaco, after Monaco-Ville. Its location between Monaco-Ville and Monte Carlo provides residents and visitors easy access to both: in the early 20th century travel writers recommended its hotels as "much cheaper than those at Monte Carlo" while also as close to the "old city" (Monaco-Ville) as a tourist could stay, because Monaco-Ville has no hotels. The late 19th century official princely archivist Gustave Saige described it as the culmination of the "small semicircular" Port Hercule, "inclined amphitheatrically towards it."

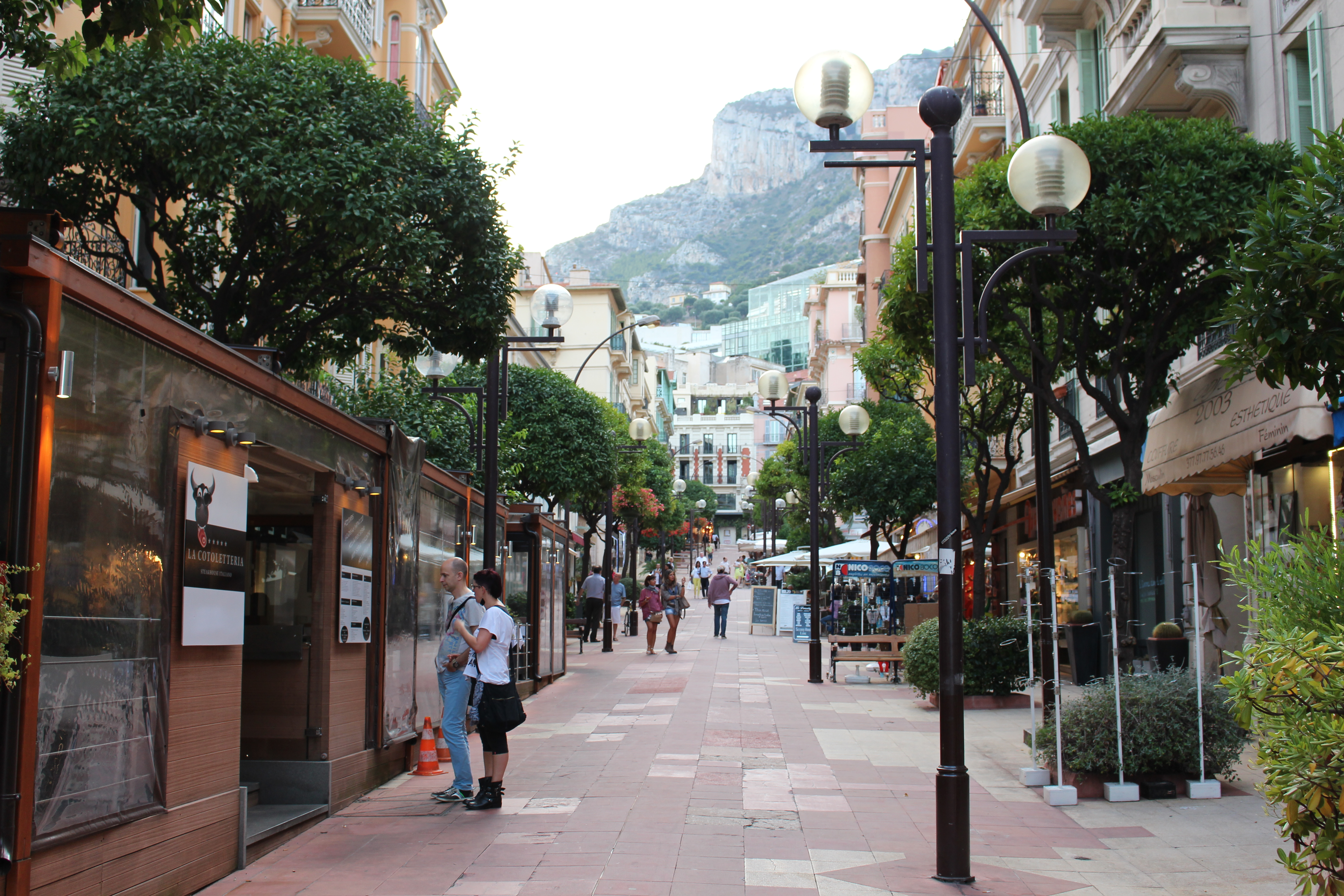
Rue Princesse Caroline, Monaco

== Education ==
- École de la Condamine
- École des Révoires
- International School of Monaco
- Regency School of Languages
- Lycée Technique et Hôtelier (hotel and technical school)
- Académie Rainier III Musique et Théâtre

== Gallery ==
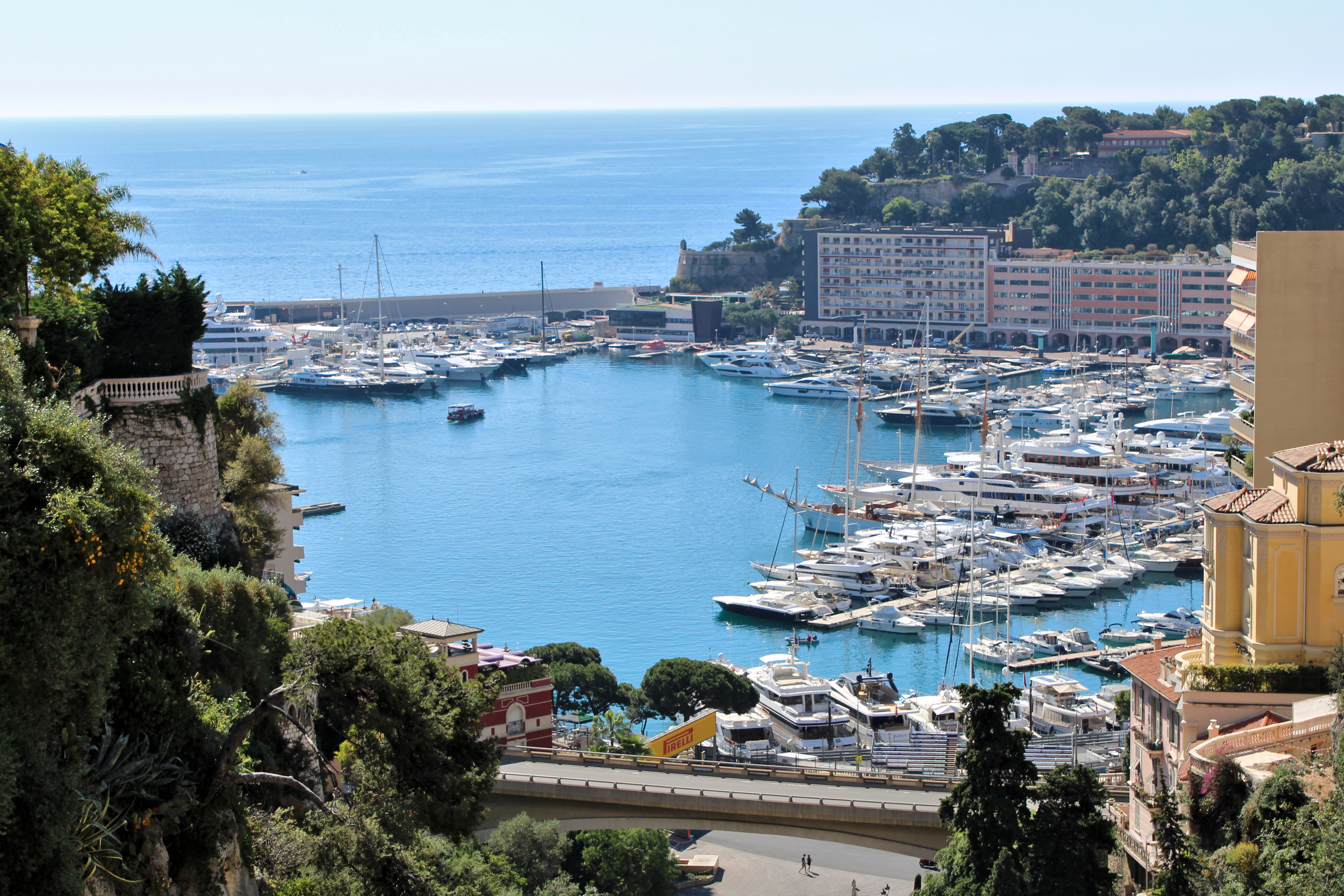
Port Hercule

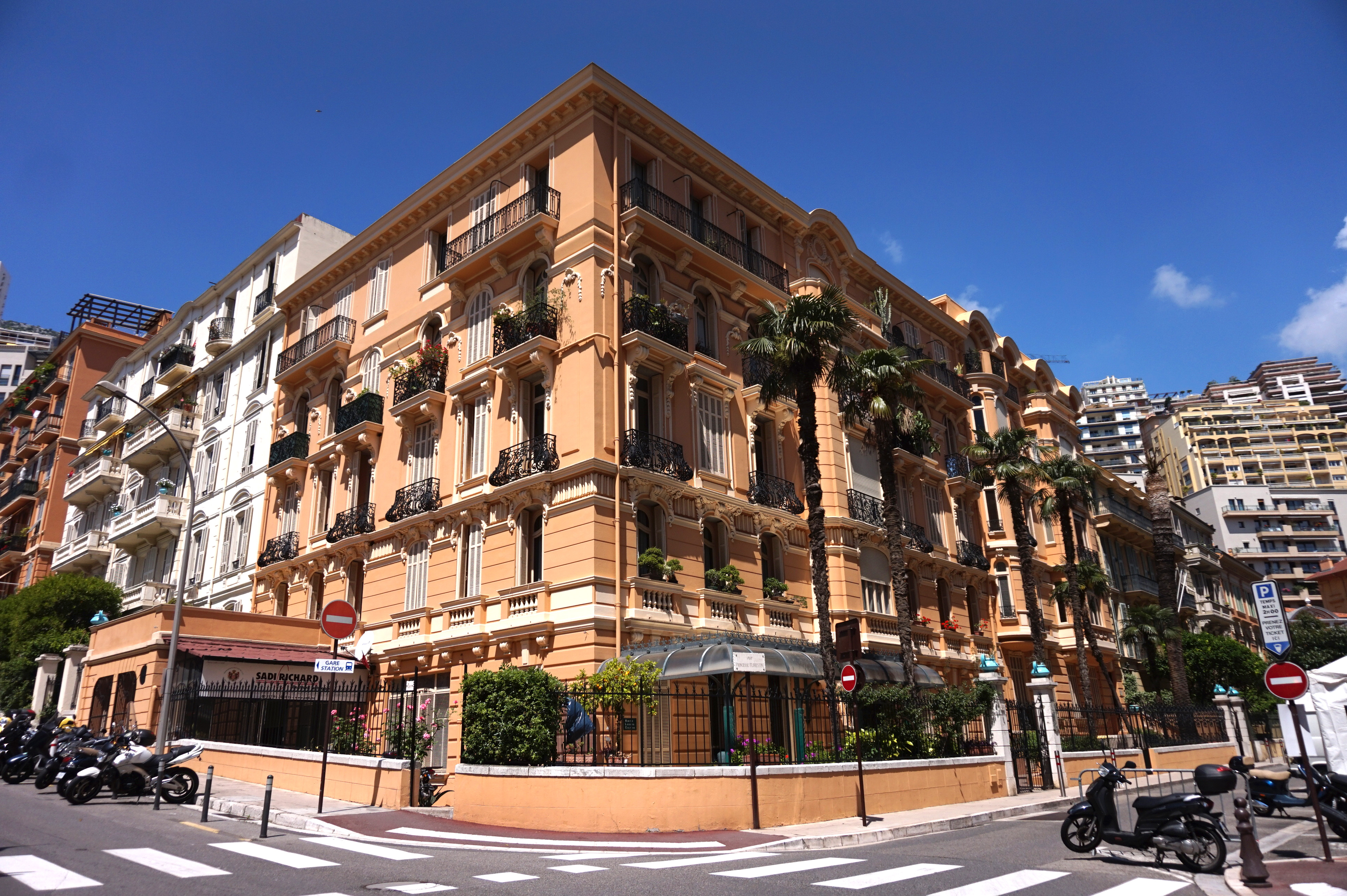
Rue Princesse Florestine

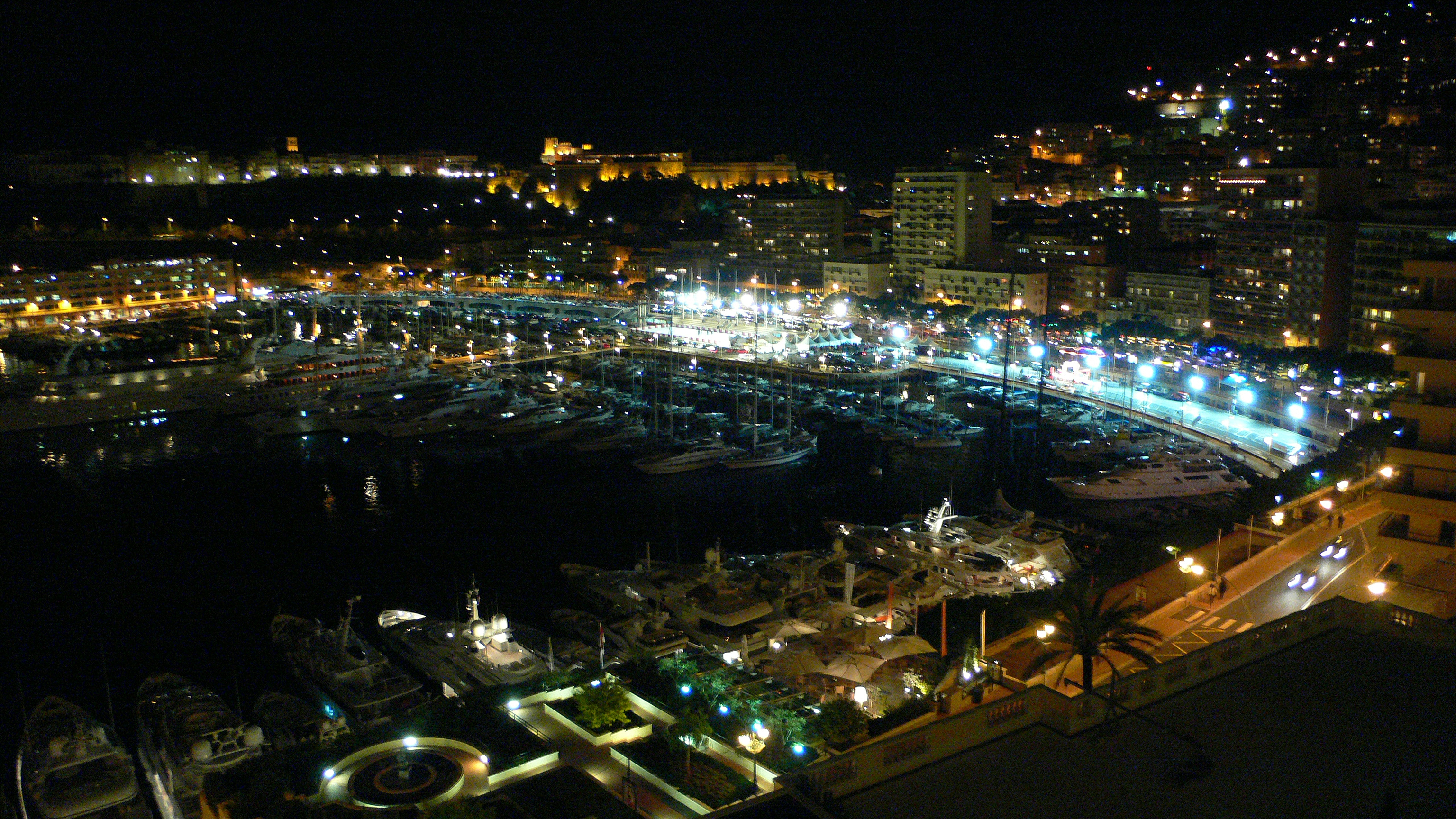
La Condamine night

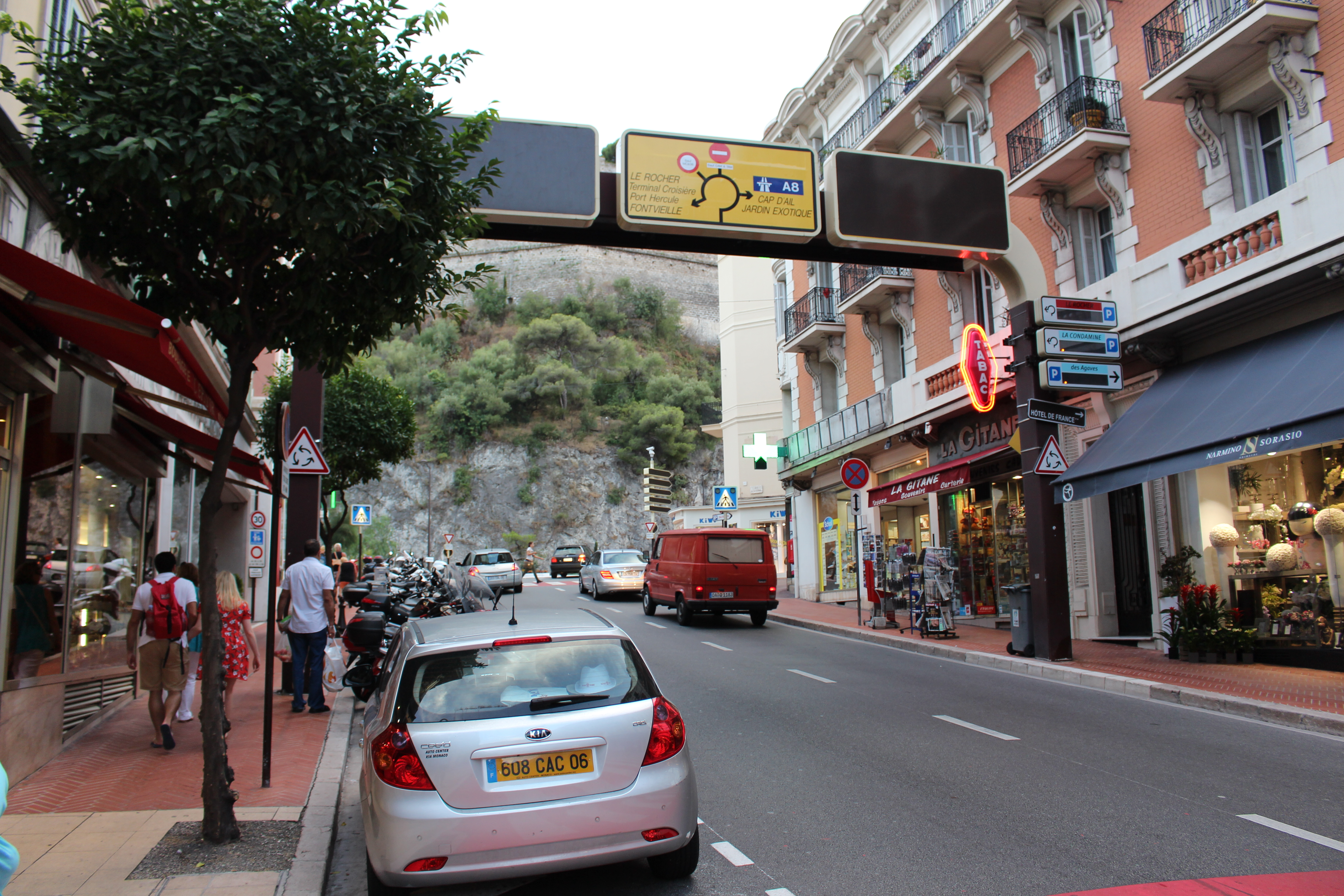
Rue Grimaldi

Tour Simona at Av. Crovetto Frères

== See also ==
- Municipality of Monaco
