= Port Hercules =

Main port of Monaco

Coordinates: 43.735°N 7.426°E

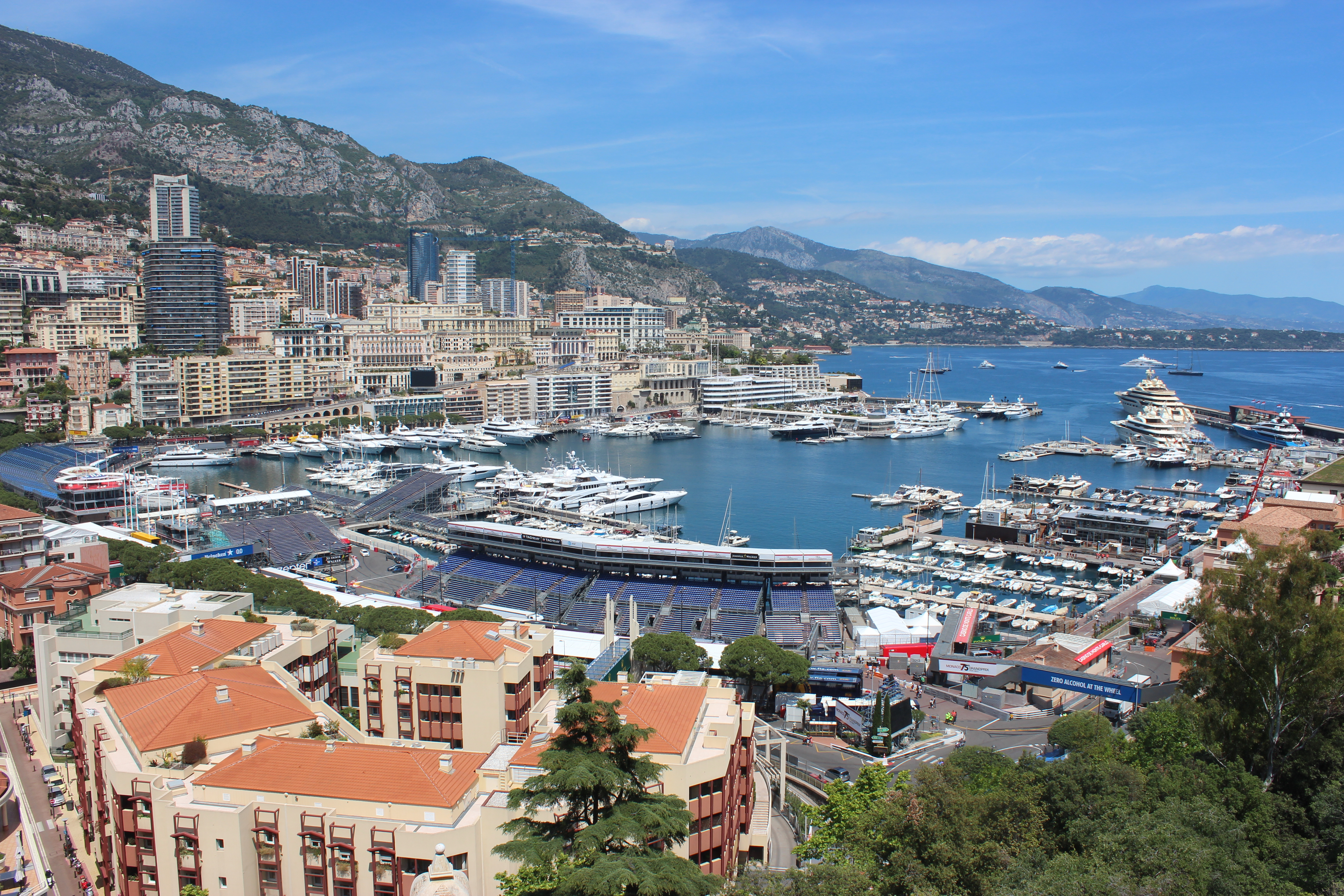
Port Hercules

Port Hercules (French: Port Hercule [pɔʁ ɛʁkyl]) is the only deep-water port in Monaco. The port has been in use since ancient times. The modern port was completed in 1926, and underwent substantial improvements in the 1970s. It covers almost 40 acres (160,000 m^{2}), enough to provide anchorage for up to 700 vessels. The port is located in the La Condamine district. Harbour pilots are required for all vessels longer than 30 metres. The depth of water in the harbour ranges from seven metres for standard berths and up to 40 metres for the outer piers and cruise ship docks.

== History ==
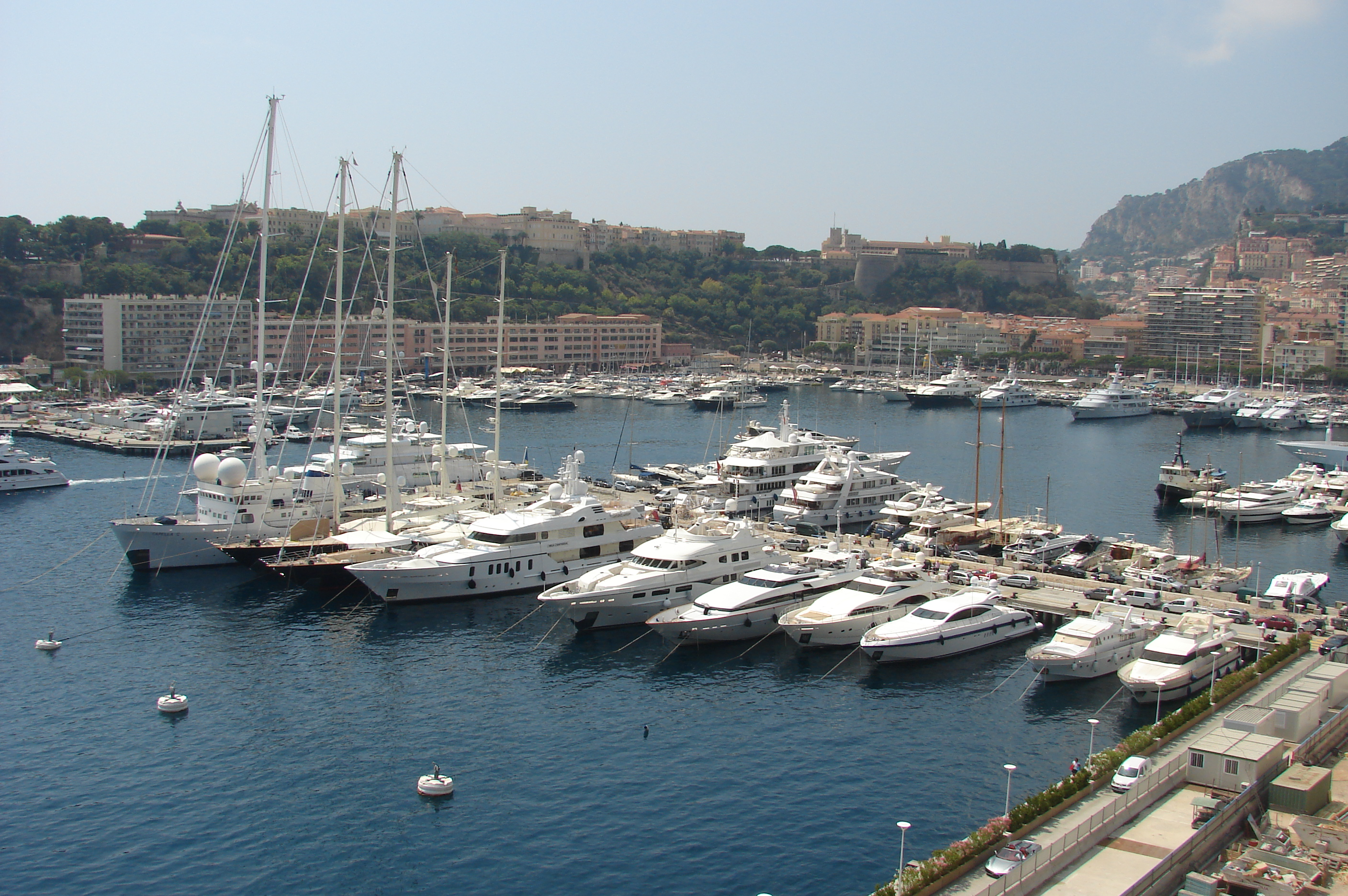
Port Hercules

During the 6th-century BC Phocaeans Greeks from Massalia (modern day Marseille) founded the colony of Mònoikos. The name of the colony derives from the local veneration of the Greek demigod and mythological hero Hercules, also later adopted by the Romans, who was said to have constructed the ancient path that passed through the region from Spain to Italy. The Roman emperor Julian also wrote of Hercules's construction of Monaco's port and a coastal road. The road was dotted with altars to Hercules, and a temple dedicated to him was established on the Rock of Monaco. The name Port Hercules was subsequently used for the ancient port. Monoeci meaning "Single One" or Monoikos meaning "Single House" could be a reference to Hercules or his temple, or the isolated community inhabiting the area around the rock.

According to the "travels of Hercules" theme, also documented by Diodorus Siculus and Strabo, both Greeks and native Ligurian people asserted that Hercules passed through the area.

After the Gallic Wars, Monoecus, which served as a stopping-point for Julius Caesar on his way to campaign in Greece, fell under Roman control as part of the Maritime Alps province (Gallia Transalpina).

The Roman poet Virgil called it "that castled cliff, Monoecus by the sea" (Aeneid, VI.830). The commentator Servius's use of the passage (in R. Maltby, Lexicon of Ancient Latin Etymologies, Leeds) asserts, under the entry portus, that the epithet was derived:

dictus autem Monoecus vel quod pulsis omnibus illic solus habitavit, vel quod in eius templo numquam aliquis deorum simul colitur.
"either because Hercules drove off everyone else and lived there alone, or because in his temple no other of the gods is worshipped at the same time."

No temple to Hercules has been found at Monaco (see also Lucan 1.405.), although the rocky ground and dense conurbation make future excavations unlikely.

The port is mentioned in Pliny the Elder's Natural History (III.v) and in Tacitus' Histories (III.42), when Fabius Valens was forced to put into the port (Fabius Valens e sinu Pisano segnitia maris aut adversante vento portum Herculis Monoeci depellitur).

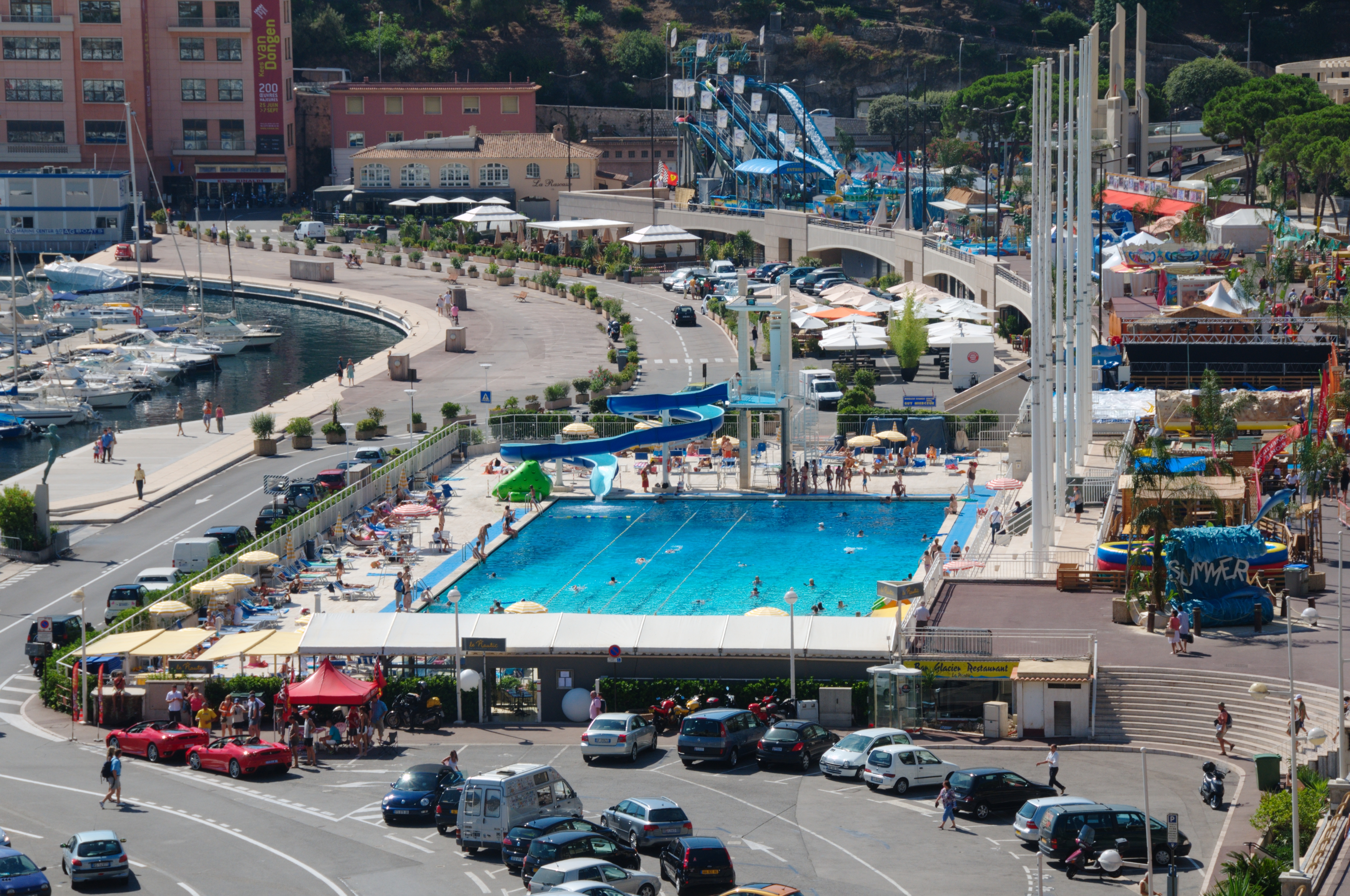
Port Hercules heated olympic-sized pool

In 2010, the Finnish manufacturer of marinas and pontoons Marinetek was hired to deliver three new pontoons to Port Hercule. Monaco's old fixed piers were replaced by Marinetek's floating concrete pontoons. The renovation was completed in 2011.

== Events ==
In 2011, Jean Michel Jarre performed a free concert in front of 85,000 spectators, to celebrate the wedding of Prince Albert II and Charlene Wittstock.

The Port Hercule is home to the Foire de Monaco, an annual fair that runs from October to November.

== In popular culture ==
In 1995, the harbour was used as a location in the James Bond film GoldenEye. Bond (played for the first time by Pierce Brosnan) tries to stop the villainous Xenia Onatopp (Famke Janssen) from stealing a helicopter, but she escapes when Bond is foiled by the local police who are unaware of who he is.

== Views ==
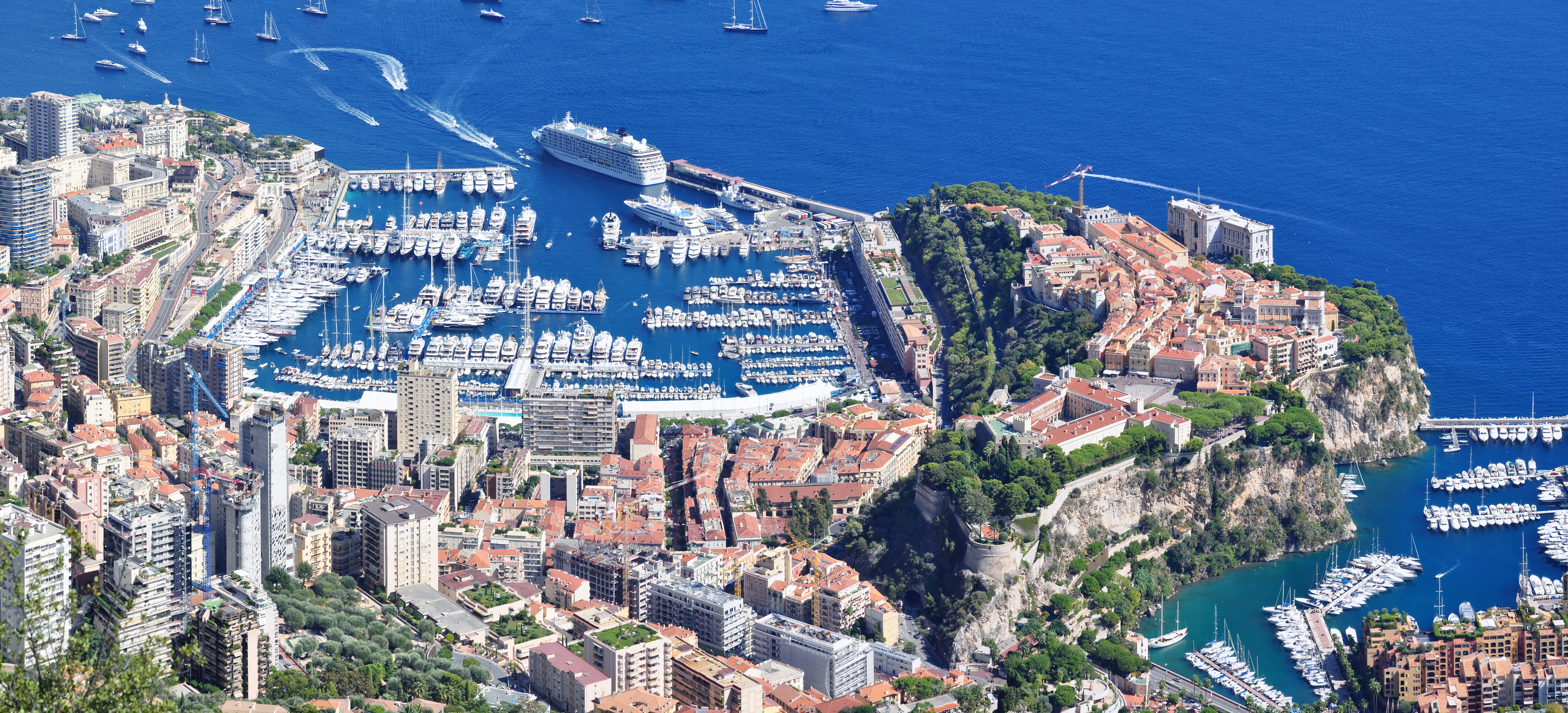
Panoramic view of Monaco City and the port of Fontvieille
