= Princess Antoinette Park =

Municipal park in Monaco

Coordinates: 43°44′1.28″N 7°24′54.59″E

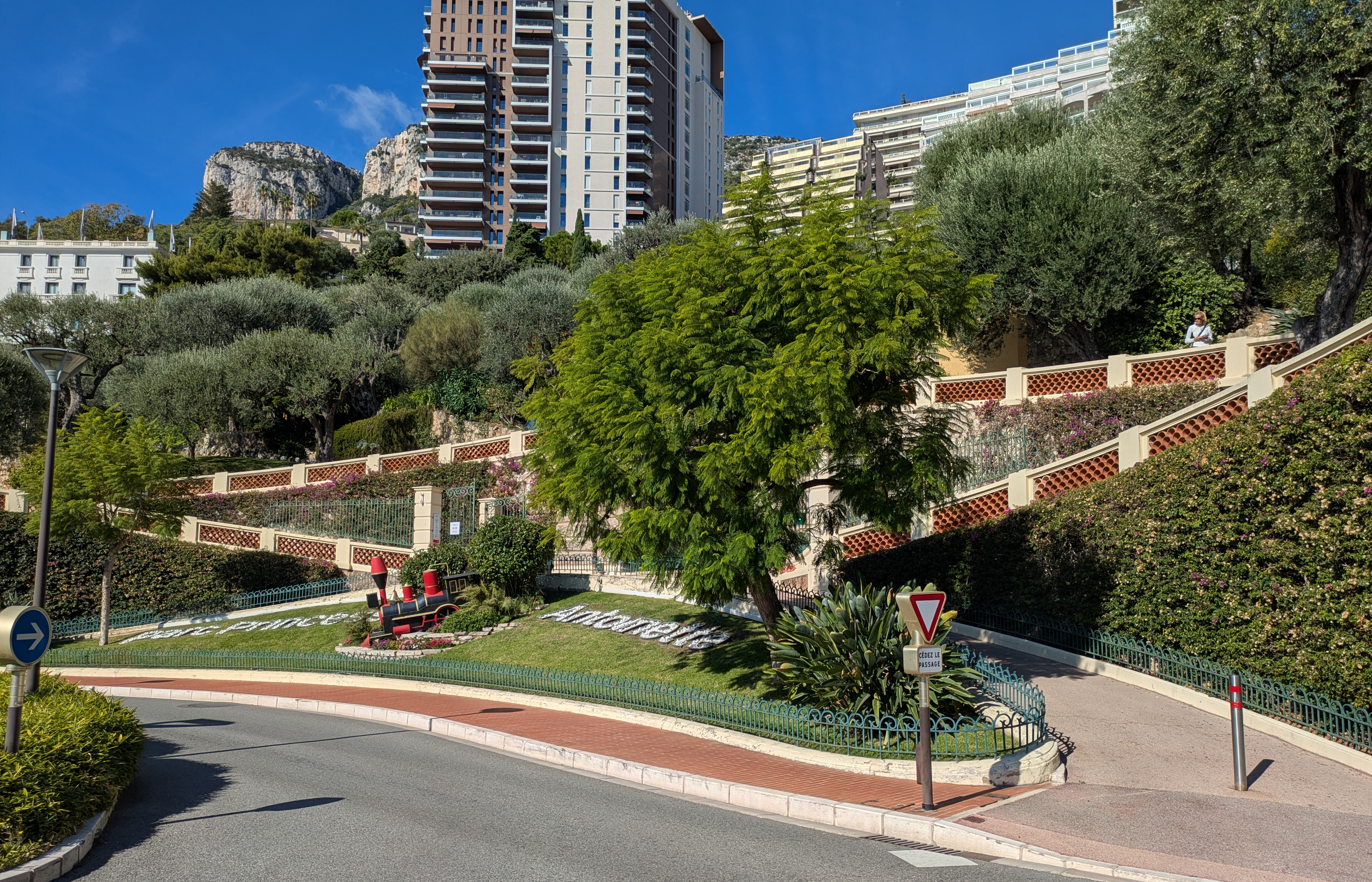
Princess Antoinette Park

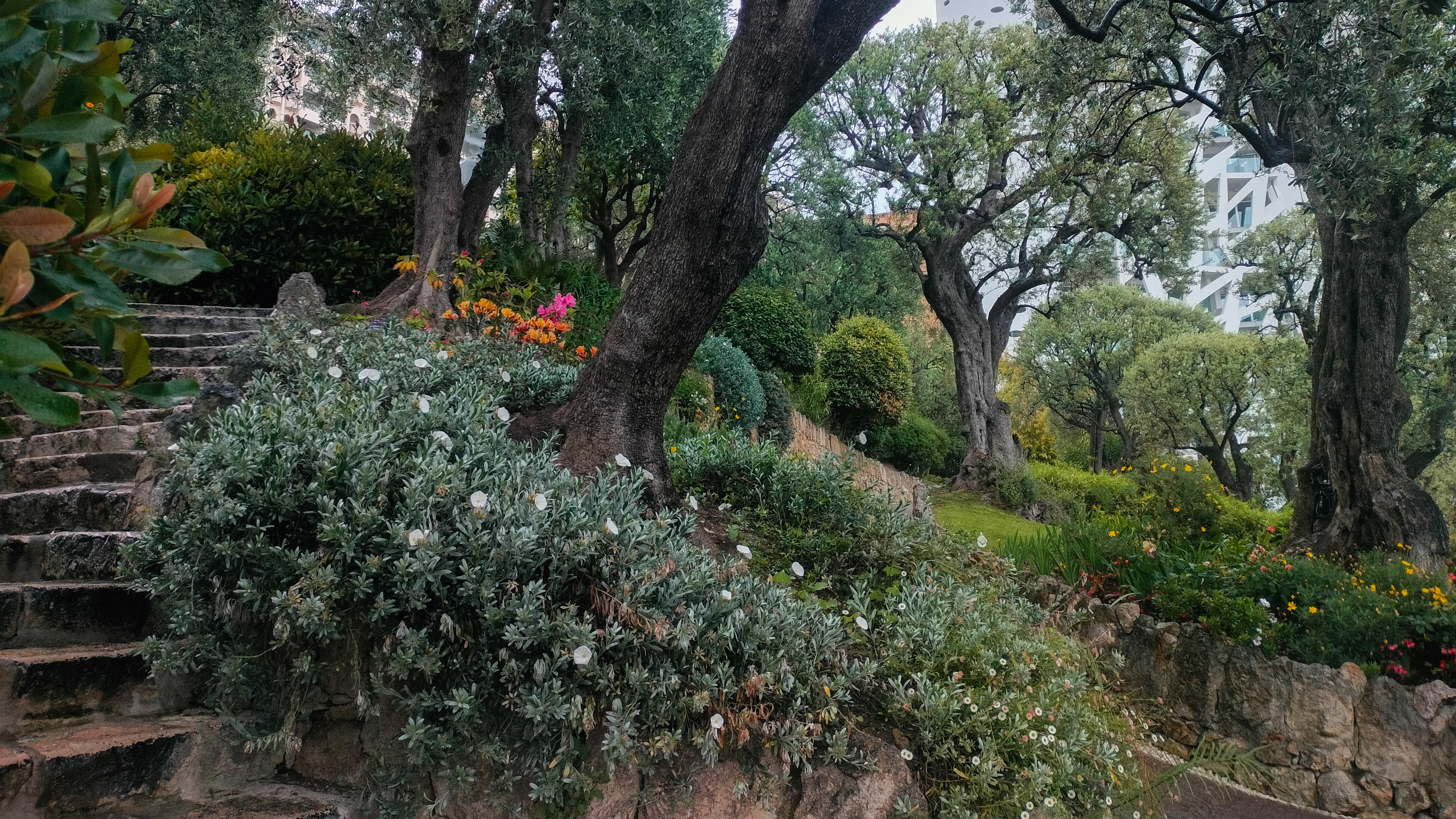
Olive trees in the Princess Antoinette park (2024)

The Princess Antoinette Park on the Boulevard de Jardin Exotique is a municipal park in the Jardin Exotique ward of Monaco. It is named for Princess Antoinette of Monaco, the elder sister of Rainier III, Prince of Monaco. The garden is dedicated to the sacred olive tree.

An annual open air meal in the Princess Antoinette Park is organised by the Municipality of Monaco at the end of June, continuing the Monegasque tradition of picnics.

The famous mini-golf has reopened on 2021 and remains an inescapable place for Monaco families' gathering.
