= Princess Grace Hospital Centre =

Coordinates: 43.7306°N 7.4114°E

Geography
- Location: 1 avenue Pasteur, La Colle, Monaco

Organisation
- Type: Teaching

Services
- Emergency department: Yes
- Beds: 631

History
- Founded: 1902

The Princess Grace Hospital Centre (French: Centre hospitalier Princesse-Grace, CHPG), named after Grace Kelly, is the only public hospital in Monaco.

== History ==
The hospital was opened in 1902 by Prince Albert I as the Monaco Hospital. A service of pediatrics was created in 1949. In 1958, the hospital was further expanded and a polyclinic was added to the complex. The health institution was renamed after Princess Grace of Monaco.

=== Births ===
- Andrea Casiraghi (born 8 June 1984)
- Charlotte Casiraghi (born 3 August 1986)
- Pierre Casiraghi (born 5 September 1987)
- Louis Ducruet (born 26 November 1992)
- Pauline Ducruet (born 4 May 1994)
- Princess Gabriella, Countess of Carladès (born 10 December 2014)
- Jacques, Hereditary Prince of Monaco (born 10 December 2014)
- Chloe Cornelia Jennifer Tops, daughter of Jan Tops and Edwina Alexander (born 30 July 2017)
- Charles Leclerc, il Predestinato (born 16 October 1997)

=== Deaths ===
- Ernest Marples (died 6 July 1978)
- Princess Grace of Monaco (died 14 September 1982)
- Princess Antoinette of Monaco (died 18 March 2011)
- Baroness Elizabeth-Ann de Massy (died 10 June 2020)

== Other ==
In 2015, it was certified by the Haute Autorité de Santé.

In 2020, a portrait of Princess Grace by Marcos Marin was installed in the hospital.
