= Christian Louis de Massy =

Monegasque noble (born 1949)

- Baron of Massy
- Full name: Christian Louis Rainier Alexandre de Massy
- Born: 17 January 1949 (age 77); Monaco
- Spouses: María Marta Quintana y del Carril (m. 1970; div. 1978) Anne Michelle Lütken (m. 1982; div. 1987) Julia Lakschin (m. 1992; div. 1995) Cécile Irène Gelabale (m. 1996; div. 2015)
- Issue: Leticia de Massy; Brice Souleyman Gelabale-de Massy; Antoine Alexandre Denis de Massy
- Father: Alexandre-Athenase Noghès
- Mother: Princess Antoinette, Baroness of Massy

Christian Louis de Massy, Baron de Massy (born 17 January 1949) is the son of Princess Antoinette of Monaco, Baroness de Massy, and her husband, international tennis champion Alexandre-Athenase Noghès. His grandfather, Antony Noghès, created the world-famous Monaco Grand Prix. He was one of the two page boys at the wedding of his uncle Rainier III with Grace Kelly.

== Biography ==
De Massy is a first cousin of the reigning Prince Albert II and nephew of Prince Rainier III. He was born out of wedlock, his parents marrying on 4 December 1951. The second of three siblings, his two sisters were Elizabeth-Ann (1947–2020) and Christine Alix (1951–1989).

== Status ==
By 1951, Rainier was the prince of Monaco, but was unmarried and had no children. Antoinette began exploring the possibility of replacing Rainier and passing the throne to her son. The Franco-Monegasque Treaty of 1918 already provided that a childless sovereign of Monaco could adopt an heir to the throne. Therefore, had Rainier then chosen to adopt Christian, that would have made him the heir presumptive (although he would lose his place in the order of succession to any children born of a subsequent marriage of Rainier).

Regardless, once Rainier married Grace Kelly and had children, Princess Antoinette's concern over succession waned and the possibility of Christian acceding to the throne became more remote. Princess Antoinette then threw her full support behind the succession of her brother. The family presented a unified front thenceforth, with Prince Rainier III granting his sister the title of Baroness of Massy, and young Christian serving as ring bearer at the marriage of his uncle to Grace Kelly.

In 2002, the constitution was adjusted to allow siblings of the reigning prince and their descendants to succeed to the throne if the sovereign lacked legitimate descendants, and Christian thereupon became 11th in line of succession to the Monegasque throne. When Albert succeeded on the death of Rainier, Antoinette was no longer the sibling of the sovereign, so she and her children lost their places in the line of succession. They and their descendants do, however, remain eligible for selection by the Crown Council to accede if the current line fails.

== Education ==
Christian de Massy was, initially, educated at the Institut Le Rosey in Switzerland. He was expelled. He then became a pupil at Downside School, Somerset, UK (September 1963-July 1967). He obtained a place at the University of Cambridge but left before completion of a degree course.

More inspired by adventure than the classroom, de Massy's self-education in the real world saw him become a professional race driver in Europe, before motorcycling the entire 7400 km coast of Brazil. He returned to a motorcycle to crisscross North America from east to west, north to south in 1994. He has lived in Spain, Zimbabwe, Argentina, Brazil, Italy, France, Hungary, Panama and the US, in addition to his homeland of Monaco. He is claimed to speak English, French, Italian, Spanish and Portuguese.

== Career ==
Christian de Massy is presently the economic attaché to the embassy of Monaco in Washington, D.C, having been appointed by Prince Albert II in 2010.

From March 2009 until his current diplomatic assignment, de Massy held the office of diplomatic advisor to the Ministry of Foreign, Economic and Financial Affairs on appointment by Albert II following nomination on 26 February 2009. His diplomatic endeavors began in 2008, when he was likewise appointed Monegasque chargé d'affaires for Latin America and the Caribbean.

Prior to holding diplomatic posts, de Massy opened the first foreign office of the Société des bains de mer de Monaco in Manhattan, New York, in 1979. Soon after he began the first mail order company to operate in Eastern Bloc countries, "Top Trading", in Hungary before the fall of the Iron Curtain.

In 1972–1973, he was a driver for Formula Renault Europe Marlboro racing team.

In 1987, he published an autobiography ghosted by celebrity biographer Charles Higham. The book was reviewed in the Tatler by Stephen Fry.

== Marriages and issue ==
Christian de Massy has been married and divorced four times.

=== First ===
He married María Marta Quintana y del Carril (b. London, 17 June 1951), daughter of Enrique Quintana y Achával, an Argentine ambassador, and his wife Marta Juana del Carril y Aldao (remarried to the 7th Duke of Tamames), in Buenos Aires on 14 November 1970. This marriage ended in 1978, with one daughter:

- Leticia de Massy (Noghès) (b. Buenos Aires, 16 May 1971) married to Jonkheer Thomas de Brouwer.

=== Second ===
He married Anne Michelle Lütken (b. 28 November 1959 – d. London, 25 November 2001) in Ramatuelle on 11 September 1982. She was the first child of Carl Fredrik Lütken and his first wife Bjørg, née Christiansen. This marriage ended in 1987, without issue.

=== Third ===
He married Julia Lakschin (b. 6 November 1968), daughter of Roman Lakschin and his wife Ludmila, in Geneva in April 1992. This marriage ended in 1995, without issue. Roman Lakschin is the Dominican ambassador to the United Nations and to the World Trade Organization. She is remarried to Ivan Mikhailovich Musatov and has issue.

=== Fourth ===
He married Cécile Irène Gelabale (b. Guadeloupe, 1968), daughter of Denis Gelabale and his wife Lucie Darius Denon, in 1996. This marriage ended in 2015 after separation since 2008. Cécile has since reverted to her maiden name and no longer uses the title of Baroness. They have two sons:

- Brice Souleyman Gelabale-de Massy (by adoption) (b. Abymes, Guadeloupe, 2 Nov 1987)
- Antoine Alexandre Denis de Massy (b. 15 January 1997; d. Monaco, 25 October 2026)

== Sources ==
- The Grimaldis of Monaco: The Centuries of Scandal, The Years of Grace by Anne Edwards. (New York, William Morrow and Company, Inc. 1992, ISBN 0-688-08837-6
