= Princess Antoinette, Baroness of Massy =

Monégasque princess (1920–2011)

Princess Antoinette
- Baroness of Massy
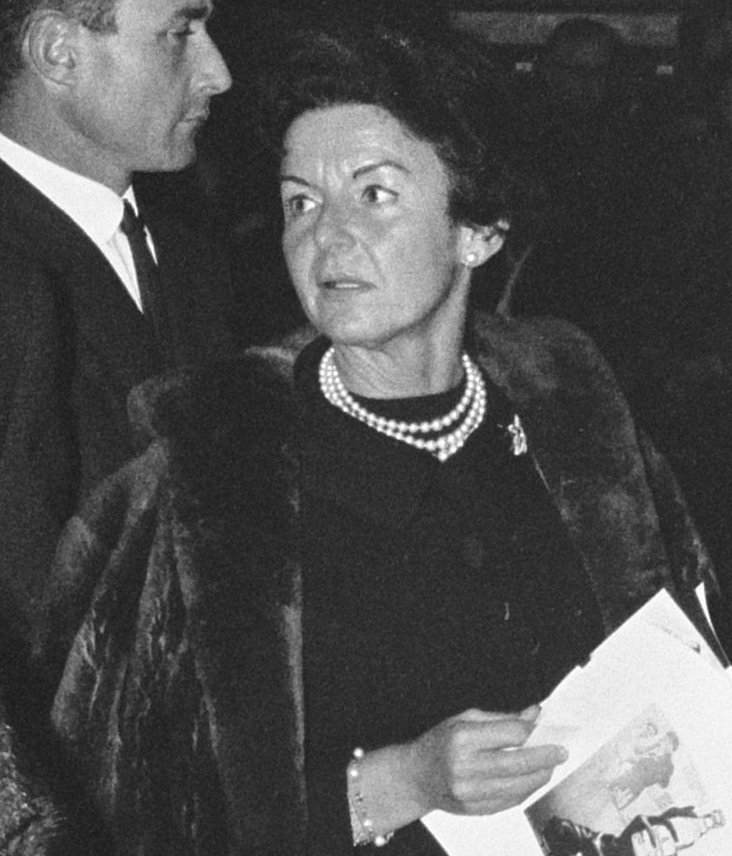
- Princess Antoinette in 1962
- Born: 28 December 1920; Paris, France
- Died: 18 March 2011 (aged 90); Princess Grace Hospital Centre, Monaco
- Burial: Chapel of Peace, Monaco
- Spouses: Alexandre-Athenase Noghès (m. 1951; div. 1954) Jean-Charles Rey (m. 1961; div. 1974) John Brian Gilpin (m. 1983; died 1983)
- Issue: Elizabeth-Ann de Massy; Christian Louis de Massy, Baron de Massy; Christine Alix de Massy
Names
- Antoinette Louise Alberte Suzanne Grimaldi
- House: Grimaldi
- Father: Count Pierre de Polignac
- Mother: Princess Charlotte, Duchess of Valentinois

Princess Antoinette, Baroness of Massy (Antoinette Louise Alberte Suzanne Grimaldi; 28 December 1920 – 18 March 2011) was a member of the princely family of Monaco. She was the elder sister of Prince Rainier III. Her parents were Princess Charlotte, Duchess of Valentinois and Count Pierre de Polignac. After plotting to depose her brother, she was effectively exiled from the royal family.

She was born in Paris, of French and Monegasque ancestry.

== Early life ==
Princess Antoinette was born on 28 December 1920 in Paris, during the reign of her great-grandfather Prince Albert I, Prince of Monaco. She was the elder child and only daughter of Princess Charlotte of Monaco and her husband Count Pierre de Polignac. Her mother was the only child of Prince Louis, Hereditary Prince of Monaco.

She was named Antoinette Louise Alberte Suzanne, after her maternal great-great-grandmother Princess Antoinette; her maternal grandfather, Prince Louis; her maternal great-grandfather, Prince Albert I; and her paternal grandmother, Countess Susana de Polignac. She was third in the line of succession at the time of her birth, preceded by her grandfather and mother, and then second in the line after the ascension of Prince Louis II, though later moved down the line after the birth of her younger brother, Prince Rainier in 1923.

== Children ==
Princess Antoinette had a long-term liaison with Alexandre-Athenase Noghès, a Monegasque-born attorney and international tennis champion, in the mid-1940s. The couple had three children born out-of-wedlock who were legitimated by their parents' subsequent marriage (on December 4, 1951) and, henceforth, included in the line of succession to the Monegasque throne until the death of Antoinette's brother, Prince Rainier III, in 2005; Elizabeth-Ann de Massy (1947–2020), Christian Louis de Massy (born 1949), and Christine Alix de Massy (1951–1989). Furthermore, there was no hereditary devolution of the title of « Baroness de Massy » but the children of Princess Antoinette, by Sovereign Ordinance of November 15, 1951, bear however the patronymic name of « de Massy ».

== Marriages ==
1. Princess Antoinette and Alexandre-Athenase Noghès subsequently married at the Monaco consulate in Genoa on 4 December 1951 (her first, his second) and divorced in 1954.
  On 15 November 1951, Antoinette was created Baroness of Massy (Baronne de Massy). Her children (Elizabeth-Ann, Christian Louis and Christine Alix) were named Grimaldi at birth. They subsequently had their names changed to de Massy. Christian Louis claimed the title of Baron through his mother. His use of the title of Baron of Massy (Baron de Massy) was subsequently approved by Prince Albert II, but only on a non-hereditary basis.
2. She married her second husband, Dr. Jean-Charles Rey (Monaco, 22 October 1914 – Monaco, 17 September 1994), president of the Conseil National (the Parlement of Monaco) in The Hague on 2 December 1961 and they divorced in 1974.
3. Her third and last husband was John Brian Gilpin (Southsea, Hampshire, 10 February 1930 – London, 5 September 1983), a British ballet dancer, whom she married in Monaco on 28 July 1983. He died suddenly six weeks later.

== Life account ==
Having divorced Noghès, she and her lover Jean-Charles Rey hatched a plan to depose her brother Rainier III, Prince of Monaco, and declare herself regent on the basis of having a son who would one day inherit the throne. This led to the breakup of the relationship.

Rainier's marriage to Grace Kelly in 1956 and the arrival of his heirs, Princess Caroline in 1957 and Prince Albert in 1958, effectively scuttled Antoinette's plans. She was removed from the Palace by her sister-in-law, Princess Grace, and thereafter was estranged from the princely family for many years.

She was known to be somewhat eccentric and was described as "completely mad" by her servants. Having been banished from Monaco in the late 1950s, she lived down the coast from Monaco at Èze, with a large collection of dogs and cats. She was the president of Monaco's Society for the Protection of Animals and Refuge and a patron of the UK-based Battersea Dogs and Cats Home.

Upon the accession of Albert II in 2005, Antoinette and her descendants lost their place in the line of succession to the Monegasque throne, which is limited to the current sovereign's descendants, siblings, and siblings' descendants.

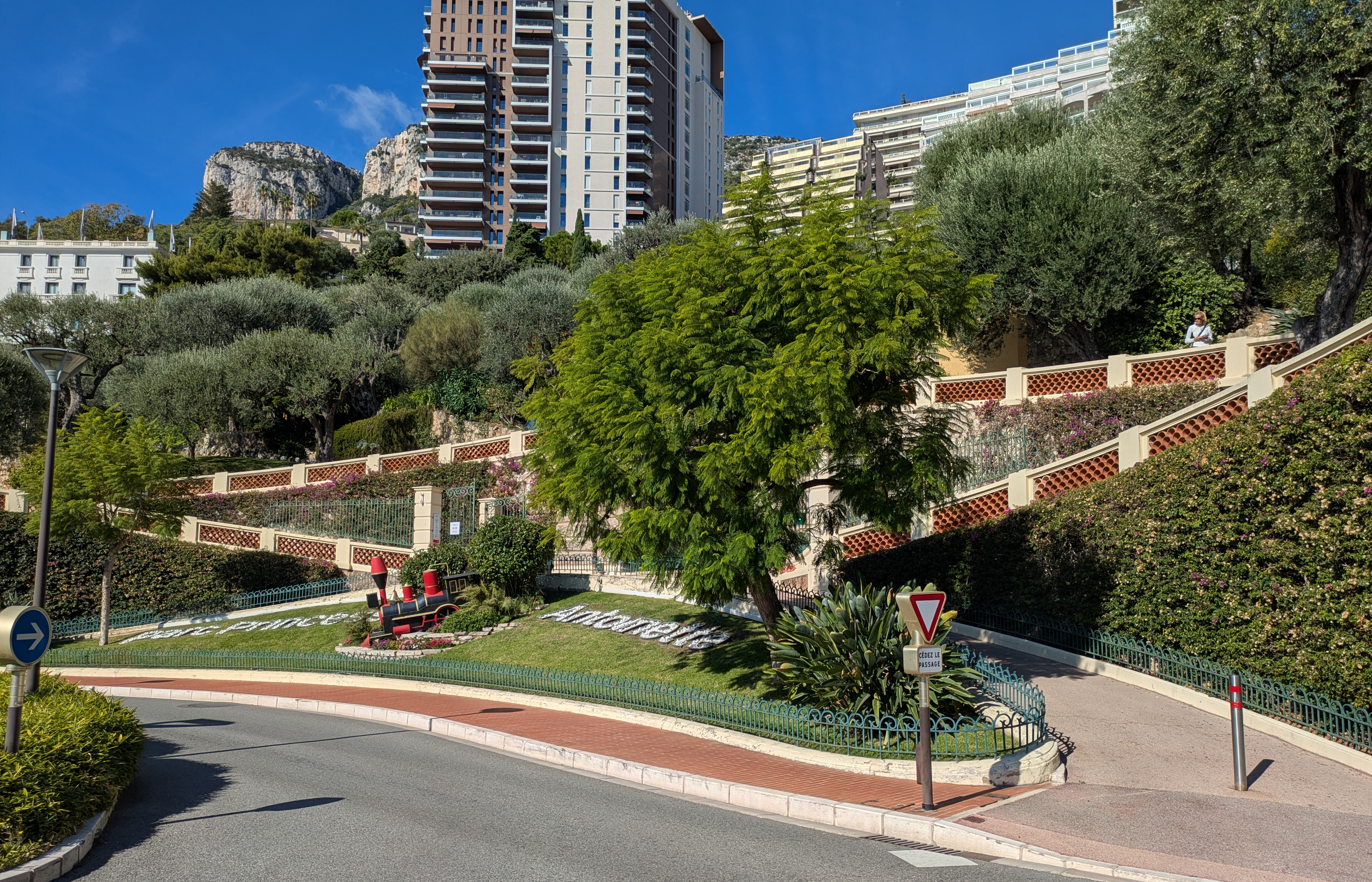
Princess Antoinette Park

The Princess Antoinette Park in Monaco's La Condamine district was named in her honour.

== Death ==
On 18 March 2011 Princess Antoinette died at The Princess Grace Hospital Centre, aged 90. Her funeral took place on 24 March 2011. She is buried in the Chapel of Peace in Monaco beside her parents, her daughters Elizabeth-Ann and Christine Alix, her last husband John Brian Gilpin and her nephew by marriage, Stefano Casiraghi.

== Patronages ==
- President of the Society for the Protection of Animals and Refuge of Monaco.
- President of the Canine Society of Monaco.
- President of the “Monaco Interviews on Energy Medicines”, which became, the “Monaco International Interviews”.
- President of the Monegasque Tennis Federation.
- President of the Monte Carlo Country Club.
- Vice-President of the Monegasque Red Cross.
- Patron of The Puppy and Kitten Clinic

== Honours ==
- Monaco: Knight Grand Cross of the Order of Saint-Charles (28 December 1938)
- Monaco: Medal for Physical Education and Sports, First Class
- Monaco: Medal of Recognition of the Monegasque Red Cross

== Bibliography ==
- Palace: My Life in the Royal Family of Monaco by Baron Christian de Massy & Charles Higham (1986, Atheneum, ISBN 0-689-11636-5)
