= Elizabeth-Ann de Massy =

Monegasque noble (1947–2020)

- Full name: Elizabeth-Ann Charlotte Mary Kathleen Dévote
- Born: 3 July 1947; Monaco
- Died: 10 June 2020 (aged 73); Princess Grace Hospital Centre, Monaco
- Buried: Chapel of Peace, Monaco
- Noble family: Grimaldi
- Spouses: Baron Bernard Alexandre Taubert-Natta (m. 1974; div. 1980) Nicolai Vladimir Costello (m. 1984; div. 1985)
- Issue: Jean-Léonard Taubert de Massy, Baron Taubert; Mélanie-Antoinette Costello de Massy
- Father: Alexandre-Athenase Noghès
- Mother: Princess Antoinette, Baroness of Massy

Elizabeth-Ann (Noghès) de Massy (3 July 1947 – 10 June 2020) was the daughter of Princess Antoinette of Monaco and Alexandre-Athenase Noghès. She was a first cousin of the reigning Prince Albert II and niece of Prince Rainier III. She was the godmother of her first cousin, Princess Stéphanie of Monaco.

== Biography ==
She was born in 1947 to Princess Antoinette of Monaco and her partner Alexandre-Athenase Noghès during the reign of her maternal great-grandfather Prince Louis II, Prince of Monaco, himself the father of Elizabeth-Ann‘s maternal grandmother Princess Charlotte, Duchess of Valentinois

Although Elizabeth-Ann was born out of wedlock, her parents married in 1951, thus legitimizing her, and placing her in line to the throne. Elizabeth-Ann could represent the Sovereign Prince of Monaco at official events.

She was the eldest of three siblings; the others were Christian Louis (born 1949) and Christine Alix (1951–1989). She was one of the four junior bridesmaids at the wedding of her uncle Rainier III with Grace Kelly.

Elizabeth-Ann was married twice.

She married firstly in Monaco on 19 January 1974 and divorced on 30 October 1980 Baron Bernard Alexandre Taubert-Natta (Geneva, 2 July 1941 – Geneva, 13 April 1989), and had one son:

- Jean-Léonard Taubert de Massy, Baron Taubert (b. Geneva, 3 June 1974). He is the godson of Prince Albert II. He married in Monaco on 25 April 2009 Suzanne Chrimes. He has one son named Melchior.

She married secondly in London on 18 October 1984 and divorced on 28 March 1985 choreographer Nicolai Vladimir Costello a.k.a. de Lusignan (b. Lees, 24 December 1943). The bride was pregnant and together they had one daughter:

- Mélanie-Antoinette Costello de Massy (b. Monaco, 18 January 1985).

She was well known for her charity work in Monaco. She was President of the Monegasque Tennis Federation and of the Monte Carlo Country Club.

She lost her place in the line of succession to the Monegasque throne upon the death of Rainier III, but remained a member of the Princely Family's "pool" of familial collaterals eligible to be selected for the Crown in the event of the extinction of the descendants of Prince Rainier.

== Patronages ==
- Vice-president of the Society for the Protection of Animals and Refuge of Monaco (1984).
- Vice-president of the Canine Society of Monaco (1985).
- Vice-president of the “Monaco Interviews on Energy Medicines” (1988), which became, the “Monaco International Interviews” (1989).
- President of the Monegasque Tennis Federation (1992).
- President of the Monte Carlo Country Club (2008).

== Honours ==
- Monaco:
  - Knight Commander of the Order of Grimaldi (17 November 2009).
  - Medal for Physical Education and Sports, Second Class (18 November 1983).
  - Medal for Physical Education and Sports, First Class (18 November 1999).
