= Family tree of Monegasque monarchs =

The following is a family tree of the Princes of Monaco.

Rainier I 1297-1314
Charles I 1342-1357
Rainier II; 1357-1407
Anthony; 1419-1427	John I 1419-1454	Pomelline Fregoso regent for Claudine	Ambrosius; 1419-1427
Niccolo Grimaldi; Lord of Antibes	Catalan; 1454- 1457
Lambert; 1420 - 1458 - 1494	Claudine; 1457-1458
John II; 1468 - 1494 - 1505	Lucien; 1487 - 1505 - 1523	Augustine Grimaldi; 1482 - 1523 - 1532
Honoré I 1522 - 1523 - 1581
Charles II; 1555 - 1581 - 1589	Hercules; 1562 - 1589 - 1604
Honoré II; 1597 - 1604 - 1662 declared Prince 1612
Hercules, Marquis of Baux; 1623 - 1651
Louis I 1642 - 1662 - 1701	Catherine-Charlotte de Gramont; 1639 - 1678
Marie of Lorraine; 1674 - 1724	Anthony I 1661 - 1701 - 1731	Elisabeth Dufort
Jacques de Goyon de Matignon, later James I 1689 - 1731 - 1733 - 1751	Louise-Hippolyte; 1697 - 1731 - 1731	Chevalier de Grimaldi; 1697 - 1784 regent 1732 - 1784
Maria-Caterina di Brignole-Sale; 1733 - 1814	Honoré III; 1720 - 1733 - 1793 - 1795
Honoré IV; 1758 - 1814 - 1819	Louise d'Aumont Mazarin; 1759 - 1826
Honoré V 1778 - 1819 - 1841	Florestan I 1785 - 1841 - 1856	Maria Caroline Gibert de Lametz; 1793 - 1879
Antoinette de Mérode-Westerloo; 1828 - 1864	Charles III; 1818 - 1856 - 1889	Princess Florestine of Monaco; 1833 - 1897	Wilhelm, 1st Duke of Urach; 1810 - 1869
Albert I 1848 - 1889 - 1922	Mary Victoria Douglas-Hamilton; 1850 - 1922	Mindaugas II of Lithuania; 1864 - 1928 heir to the Monegasque throne
Marie Juliette Louvet; 1867- 1930	Louis II; 1870 - 1922 - 1949
Prince Pierre, Duke of Valentinois; 1895 - 1964	Princess Charlotte, Duchess of Valentinois; 1898 - 1977
Princess Antoinette, Baroness of Massy; 1920 - 2011	Rainier III; 1923 - 1949 - 2005	Grace Kelly; 1929 - 1982
Caroline, Princess of Hanover b. 1957	Albert II; 1958 - 2005 - present	Charlene Wittstock b.1978	Princess Stéphanie of Monaco b. 1965
Princess Gabriella b. 2014	Prince Jacques b. 2014
