= List of rulers of Monaco =

This article lists the rulers of Monaco. Most belong to the House of Grimaldi; exceptions, which consist primarily of the principality's administrators under periods of foreign occupation, are noted.

== History ==
The House of Grimaldi, descended from Otto Canella, a statesman from the Republic of Genoa, and taking their name from his son Grimaldo, were an ancient and prominent Guelphic Genoese family. Members of this family, in the course of the civil strife in Genoa between the Guelphs and Ghibellines, were banned from Genoa in 1271 and took refuge in Monaco.

François Grimaldi seized the Rock of Monaco in 1297, starting the Grimaldi dynasty, under the Genoese sovereignty. The Grimaldis acquired Menton in 1346 and Roquebrune in 1355, enlarging their possessions. These two towns (some 95% of the country's territory) were eventually ceded to France by the Franco-Monégasque Treaty in 1861.

France recognized the sovereignty of the Lordship of Monaco in 1489 and the sovereignty of the Principality of Monaco in 1641.

The Grimaldis used the title of Lord until 1612. Then, Lord Honoré II started using the title of Prince, thereby becoming the first Prince of Monaco. Afterwards, Honoré II secured recognition of his independent sovereignty from Spain in 1633, and then from France by the Treaty of Péronne in 1641. Since then the area has remained under the control of the Grimaldi family to the present day, except when under French control from 24 February 1793 to 17 May 1814.

== Rulers of Monaco ==
Name (Birth–Death)	Portrait	Reign start	Reign end	Notes
François Grimaldi (?–1309)		8 January 1297	10 April 1301	François Grimaldi was the leader of a group of Genoese that seized the Rock of Monaco.; His cousin Rainier was the first Grimaldi ruler of the area now known as Monaco.
Rainier I, Lord of Cagnes (1267–1314)		8 January 1297	10 April 1301	François Grimaldi was the leader of a group of Genoese that seized the Rock of Monaco.; His cousin Rainier was the first Grimaldi ruler of the area now known as Monaco.
Under Genoese control from 10 April 1301 to 12 September 1331
Lords of Monaco
Charles I (?–1357)		12 September 1331	15 August 1357	Son of Rainier I, he retook the Rock from the Genoese.; Won Menton (1346) and Roquebrune (1355).; After 29 June 1352 co-rulership with; Anthony I (?-1358), youngest brother of Rainier I; Rainier II (1350–1407), son of Charles I; Gabriel, son of Charles I
Anthony I (?–1358)		29 June 1352	15 August 1357	Co-ruler
Rainier II (1350–1407)		29 June 1352	15 August 1357	Son of Charles I; Co-ruler since 29 June 1352; Yielded Monaco to the besieging Genoese for 20,000 fl. but retained Menton and Roquebrune.
Gabriel (?–?)		29 June 1352	15 August 1357	Co-ruler
Under Genoese control from 15 August 1357 to January 1395
Louis (?–1402)		January 1395	19 December 1395	Son of Charles I; Ruled jointly with Jean I
Jean I (1382–1454)		January 1395	19 December 1395	Son of Rainier II; Ruled jointly with Louis
Under Genoese control from 19 December 1395 to 11 May 1397
Louis (?–1402)		11 May 1397	5 November 1402	
Under Genoese control from 5 November 1402 to 5 June 1419
Jean I (1382–1454)		5 June 1419	8 May 1454	Sons of Rainier II, Jean, Ambroise and Antoine, bought back Monaco from Genoa and ruled it jointly until 1427. After Antoine's death, Jean bought out his brothers in exchange for the rule over Menton and Roquebrune.; Monaco was occupied by the Duchy of Milan under the governorship of Genoese Biagio Assereto from 3 October to November 1436.; On 20 November 1441, Jean gained sovereignty for Monaco.; Jean's testament replaced the Lex Salica with Male-preference primogeniture, thus allowing for female succession (then British system).
Ambroise (?–1433)		5 June 1419	1427	
Anthony II (?–1427)		5 June 1419	1427	
Catalan (?–1457)		8 May 1454	July 1457	
Claudine (c. 1451–1515)		July 1457	16 March 1458 (de facto); 19 November 1515 (de jure)	Under the regency of her paternal grandmother Pomellina Fregoso; Ruled jointly with her cousin Lamberto, whom she married in 1465.
Lamberto (c. 1420–1494)		16 March 1458	March 1494	
Jean II (1468–1505)		March 1494	11 October 1505	Son of Lamberto and Claudine; Murdered by his brother, Lucien
Lucien (1487–1523)		11 October 1505	22 August 1523	Son of Lamberto and Claudine; Murdered his brother, Jean II; Murdered by his nephew, Bartholomew Doria of Dolceacqua
Augustine (1482–1532)		22 August 1523	14 April 1532	Son of Lamberto and Claudine
Honoré I (1522–1581)		22 August 1523 (de facto); 14 April 1532 (de jure)	7 October 1581	Son of Lucien; During his minority under the regency of; Augustine Grimaldi, bishop of Grasse (de facto regent; de jure Lord), 22 August 1523 – 14 April 1532; Nicholas Grimaldi, 14–23 April 1532; Blanche Grimaldi, baronne de Tourette (co-regent), 14 April– 1 July 1532.; Étienne Grimaldi, 23 April 1532 – 16 December 1540
Charles II (1555–1589)		7 October 1581	17 May 1589	Son of Honoré I
Ercole (1562–1604)		17 May 1589	29 November 1604	Son of Honoré I; Murdered
Honoré II (1597–1662)		29 November 1604	10 January 1662	Son of Ercole; Until 1616 under the regency of Prince Francis Landi of Valdetare; Starting in 1612, Honoré II was the first Monegasque ruler to adopt the personal style of Prince, to which the Grimaldi rulers of Monaco were already entitled to through their possession in Italy. Monaco was recognized as a sovereign principality by Philip IV of Spain in 1633 and by Louis XIII of France in the Treaty of Péronne of 1641.
Sovereign Princes of Monaco
Louis I (1642–1701)		10 January 1662	3 January 1701	Grandson of Honoré II
Antonio I (1661–1731)		3 January 1701	20 February 1731	Son of Louis I
Louise Hippolyte (1697–1731)		21 February 1731	29 December 1731	Daughter of Antonio I
Jacques I (1689–1751)		29 December 1731	7 November 1733	Husband of Louise Hippolyte; Left the country on 20 May 1732, with his brother-in-law, Antoine Grimaldi acting as regent.; Abdicated on 7 November 1733.
Honoré III (1720–1795)		7 November 1733	19 January 1793	Son of Jacques I and Louise Hippolyte; Until 28 November 1784 under the regency of his uncle, Antoine Grimaldi
French occupation (19 January 1793 – 17 May 1814)
National Convention		19 January 1793	24 February 1793	President: Joseph Barriera
Annexed by France		24 February 1793	17 May 1814	Governed by: Armand Louis de Gontaut, French military commandant 24 February 1793 – 1 March 1793; Henri Grégoire, French commissioner after 1 March 1793; Grégoire Marie Jagot, French commissioner
Allied occupation (17 May – 17 June 1814)
Honoré IV (1758–1819)		30 May 1814	16 February 1819	Son of Honoré III; Titular prince since 21 March 1795; Under the regency of; Joseph Grimaldi, his brother, 17–23 June 1814; the State Council, 23 June 1814 – 4 March 1819 Members: Louis Millo-Terrazzani, Horace Pretti de Saint-Ambroise, Antoine Sigaldi, Joseph Rey, Honoré Albini.; Honoré Grimaldi, his son, 3 March 1815 – 16 February 1819
Honoré V (1778–1841)		16 February 1819	2 October 1841	Son of Honoré IV; Regent for his father since 3 March 1815
Florestan (1785–1856)		2 October 1841	20 June 1856	Son of Honoré IV
Charles III (1818–1889)		20 June 1856	10 September 1889	Son of Florestan
Albert I (1848–1922)		10 September 1889	26 June 1922	Son of Charles III
Louis II (1870–1949)		26 June 1922	9 May 1949	Son of Albert I
Rainier III (1923–2005)		9 May 1949	6 April 2005	Grandson of Louis II; From 31 March to 6 April 2005 under the regency of his son, Albert
Albert II (born 1958)		6 April 2005	Incumbent	Son of Rainier III; Regent for his father from 31 March to 6 April 2005

== See also ==
- Monarchy of Monaco
- Family tree of Monegasque monarchs
- Hereditary Prince of Monaco
- List of Monégasque consorts

== Sources ==
- Burke's Royal Families of the World, Vol. 1: Europe and Latin America. London: Burke's Publishing Co., 1977. ISBN 0-85011-029-7
- Cahoon, Benjamin. "Monaco". World Statesmen.
- Velde, François. "Monaco". Heraldica.
