= Coat of arms of Monaco =

Versions
- Version with buglers (commonly seen on vehicle registration plates)
- Armiger: Albert II, Prince of Monaco
- Shield: Fusily argent and gules
- Supporters: Two Franciscan monks haired, bearded, and vested, each holding a raised sword, standing on a ribbon with the motto
- Motto: Deo Juvante (Latin for "With God's Help")
- Order: Order of Saint-Charles

The coat of arms of Monaco, referred to also as an armorial achievement or an arms of dominion, is the symbolic representation of the House of Grimaldi, the current sovereigns of the principality of Monaco.

The armorial achievement carries important symbolic meaning and not only represents the Grimaldis' pedigree, but also their rule over the territories they possess. In this case, the Franciscan Friars, the crown, collar of the Order of Saint Charles, and lozenge of red and argent all link to events in history relevant to their rise in Monaco as sovereigns, dating as far back as the 13th Century.

As to the origins of this achievement: traditionally borne by the eldest male of each generation and tailored to their individuality, the modern image we see today is reminiscent of hundreds of years of tradition rather than a single heir. Being of Italian descent themselves, the Grimaldi connection to Genoese aristocracy is old but strong; their influence over Monaco has lasted over several hundred years – originating in their ascent to power beginning in the late 11th Century.

== Official description ==
The government of Monaco describes the coat of arms as follows:

Shield: fusily argent and gules, surrounded by a collar of the Order of Saint Charles, placed on a red mantle doubled ermine, topped with the Princely Crown.

Supporters: two Franciscan monks, haired, bearded and vested, each holding a raised sword, standing on a ribbon with the motto: DEO JUVANTE.

== Grimaldi Origins ==
The House of Grimaldi originated in Genoa, Italy, as a prominent family who sourced their wealth mainly through maritime trade and rose to prominence during the 12th Century. With regard to personal linkage, Otto Canella is believed to be the first recorded member of this family who held significance, where his role as Consul to the Republic of Genoa in 1133 arguably marked the establishment of the family as its own authority along the Franco-Italian coast. His heir, Grimaldo Canella, also graced the offices of Genoa, in the same role but this time elected thrice over, with the last year of this role being in 1184. Following this, his son, Oberto also followed in his predecessor's footsteps but no longer bore the last name "Canella" – instead replacing it with the patronymic "Grimaldi". According to some accounts, it has been argued that this name change was due to the considerable affluence that the family had attained and the thought that a 'grander' name was required to differentiate themselves from the more commonly heard surnames (therefore, families). It was at this time, that the first armorial representation of the Grimaldi family appeared. Further information on this is explained in the Lozengy Gules and Argent section.

== Armoured friars ==
The armoured friars on either side of the shield reflect the creation of Monaco under Grimaldi rule, involving one François Grimaldi also known as the "Malizia". These supporters serve as a reminder of the victory of François Grimaldi over the Ghibellines, whose failed attempt to guard the Rock of Monaco meant the eventual conquest and consequently, the beginning of Grimaldi dominance over this region in 1297. Symbolically, the monks are a core part of this history because François Grimaldi was said to have disguised himself as one in order to penetrate the fortress without detection, hence, the unusual combination of a religious figure defiantly holding a weapon as a dominant theme in this armorial achievement. January 4 of that year has been regarded as the birth of the Monaco that stands today, where the Grimaldi family still holds significant (if not all) power over this territory, giving great historical value to the symbols associated with this story.

With regard to the lineage of this figure, despite François Grimaldi's familiar surname, the current sovereigns in power today are technically not the direct descendants of the famous "Malizia"; due to the fact that no children were borne from his own marriage, it was his cousin, Rainier I who became his successor and Lord of Monaco. Despite this slight variation in direct blood ties, the armorial achievement still remained very much the same, as the tale of the "Malizia" was a great source of pride for the Monégasque people, especially given the metaphorical significance of the Guelph victory over the Ghibellines. Further, as illustrated in historical records, the armoured monks' presence on the family achievement has lasted for over 700 years, origins of which are clearly regarded as of legendary status to the Monégasque community, therefore, highly valuable to their heritage.

== Lozengy Gules and Argent ==
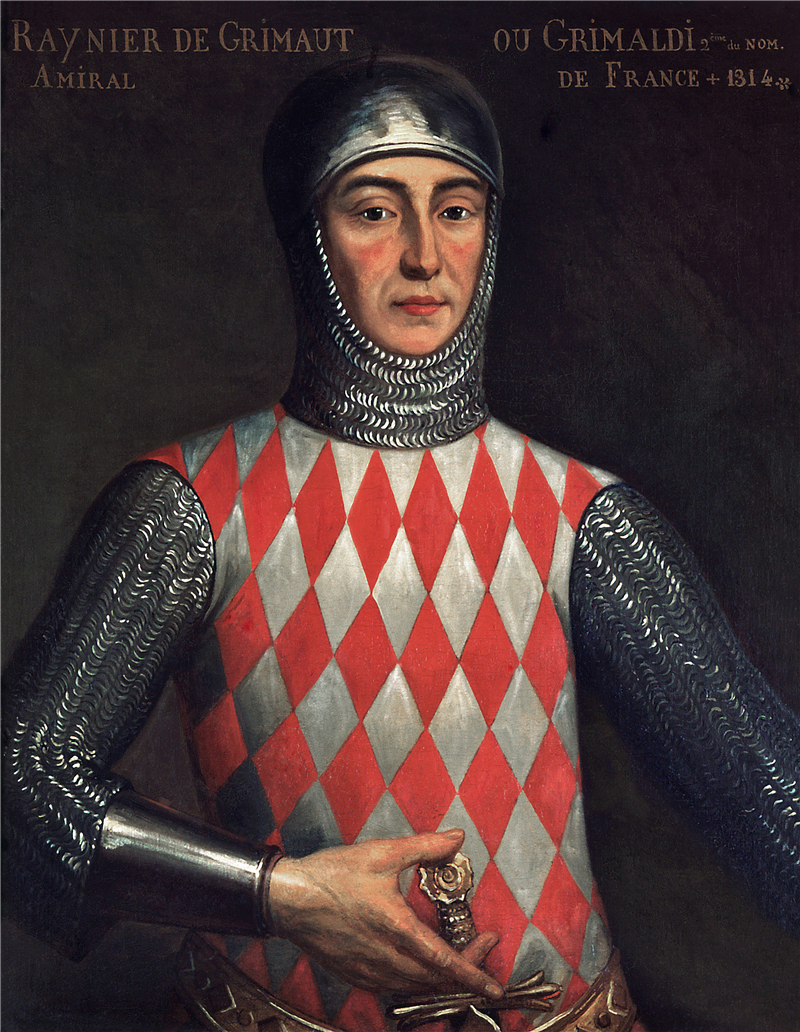
Rainier I wearing lozengy gules and argent tabard, painted in 1861.

Lozengy gules and argent refers to the repetitive red and silver diamond pattern on the main shield. The meaning behind this particular lozenge points to individuals of noble birth, and accordingly, explain the origins of the House of Grimaldi as a high-ranking family in society. The current-day relevance of this pattern for these sovereigns is rooted in their ancestor, Grimaldo Canella, whose armorial achievement consisted solely of the lozengy of gules and argent.

The significance of Grimaldo Canella as another core detail of this armorial achievement is rooted in his major role in the establishment of the Grimaldi name itself. Grimaldi as a surname began with the lozengy gules and argent shield, which has been carried through the generations to honour the beginning of this dynasty, while also being built upon as the family went from successful merchants to the sovereigns of Monaco. As indicated by this, the maintenance of this pattern as a central part of the Grimaldi armorial achievement shows a continuous acknowledgment of their ties to Genoese aristocracy alluding to the historical struggle of the region between rulers, and the eventual domination of the Grimaldi family over it.

The nature of the lozenge pattern itself also indicates a possible link to French roots of some kind, most of which could be explained through the diplomatic relations held between Monaco and France ever since its establishment as a Grimaldi region. Here, a heraldic pattern rooted in French origins could be symbolic of a very early acknowledgement of Franco-Monégasque relations; an especially useful display of loyalty for leaders seeking to be acknowledged as a sovereign by powerful allies of the time. Regardless of the validity of this notion, the red and silver lozenge pattern is certainly an incredibly historically wealthy aspect of the armorial achievement – a status of which is shown through its usage in many aspects of everyday tools of Monégasque classification.

== The Order of Saint Charles collar and the crown ==
Both the Order of Saint Charles collar and the inclusion of a crown in the achievement are important in learning about the family itself, where both elements indicate high status and illustrate the Grimaldi family's rise to power. The Order of Saint Charles, being an order of knighthood bestowed by the sovereign as a reward of high honour, is an affirmation of Monaco's sovereignty. Meanwhile, the crown is hugely significant because it illustrates an acknowledgement of Monaco as possessing its own political autonomy – a process which has been arguably worked towards since 1419. All symbolic ties previously borne by the family were merged to also represent the state.

== Motto ==
The motto "Deo Juvante" means 'with the help of God' and illustrates the Grimaldi family's long history with the belief of the Catholic Church as a Holy power. The phrase is said to have been taken from another Grimaldi ancestor who supposedly illustrated the favour of their cause in a letter, illustrating their confidence against a said plot to remove the Grimaldi family from power in 1458, a plan which was foiled.

Another link here is to the aforementioned religious symbolism of the armoured Monks, connecting back to the seizure of the fortress atop the Rock of Monaco and the even further back to the Grimaldi connection to the Guelphs versus Ghibellines conflict in the 12th and 13th centuries, which formed an integral part of their past struggles for power. The nature of this historical conflict has confirmed their strong support for the papacy as an opposing power to the Germans (in support of the Holy Roman Emperors), and with it, the significance of incorporating these beliefs into the very emblem that represents the House of Grimaldi. Knowing this, despite the fact that the country is largely dominated by French culture, many of the conflicts that formed Monaco today are Italian in origin, which gives further reason to this rich religious and familial history.

== The Armorial Achievement in Monaco today ==
Today, the armorial achievement of Monaco is more of a national emblem rather than a status symbol of the Grimaldi family itself. However, Albert II, the current Prince of Monaco does bear this symbol as his heraldic representation, and given the historical significance of this achievement, it will certainly be passed on through each heir as future sovereigns emerge. In addition, some parts of this emblem have been used in other parts of everyday life in Monaco; the motto is not only on the armorial achievement but on the coins, and a simplified variant of the arms is used on number plates for vehicles – further evidence that though the armorial achievement is reminiscent of much older times, it now represents Monaco and its people more so than the family itself.

== Historical Arms of Monaco ==

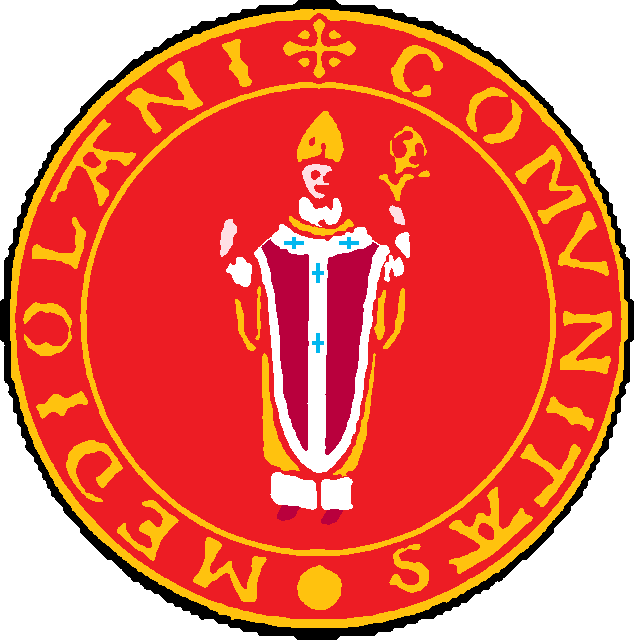

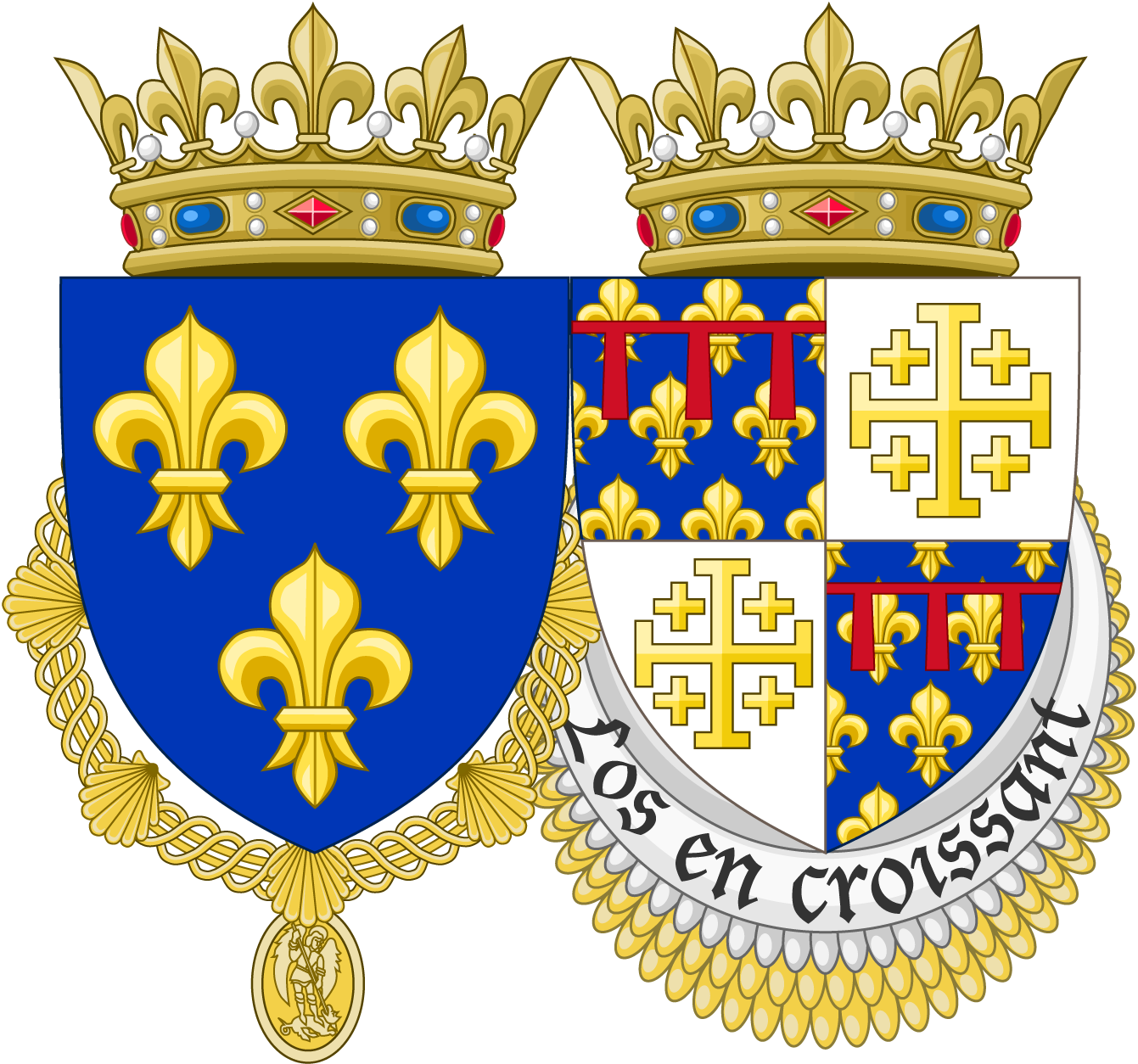

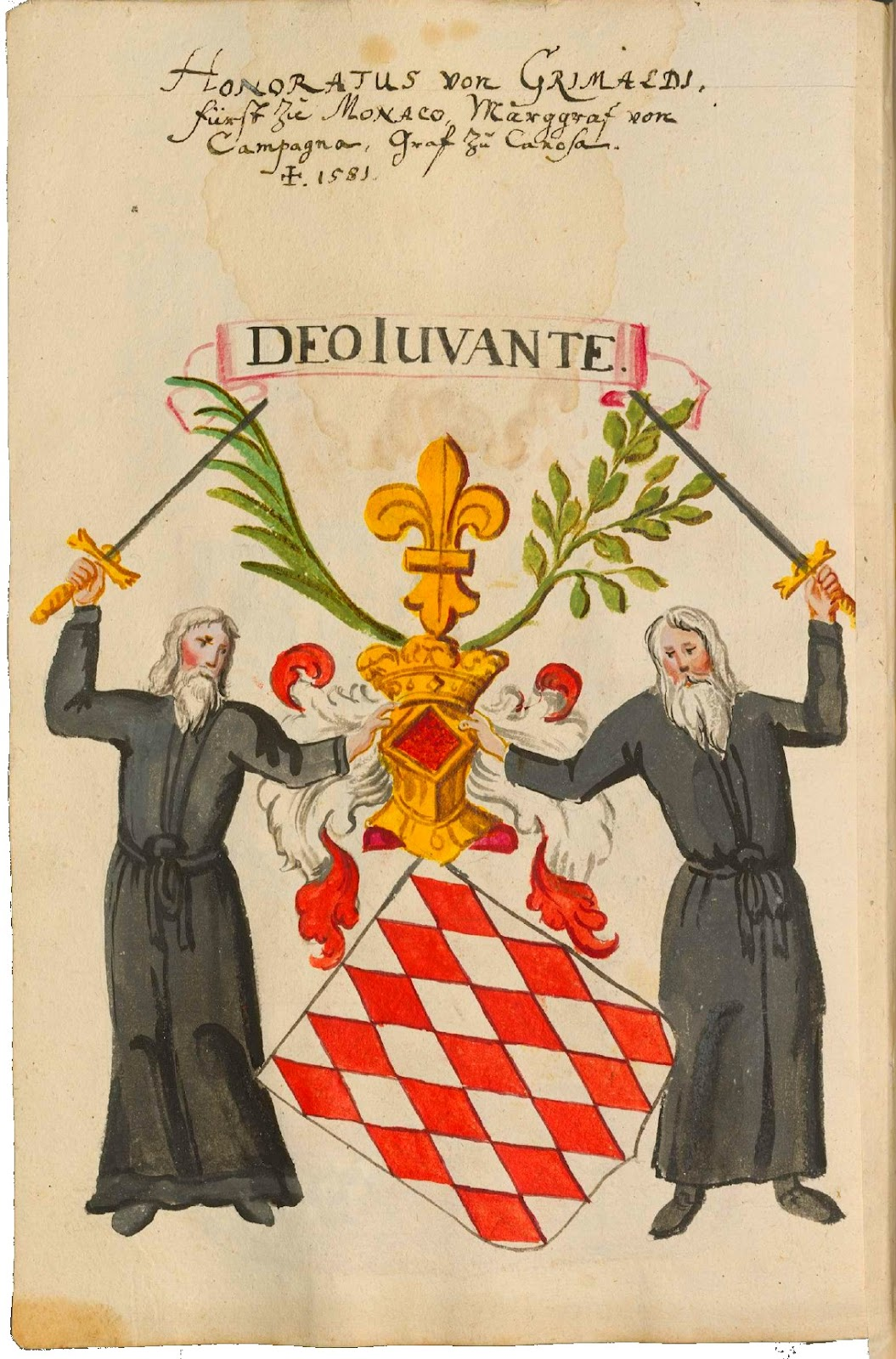

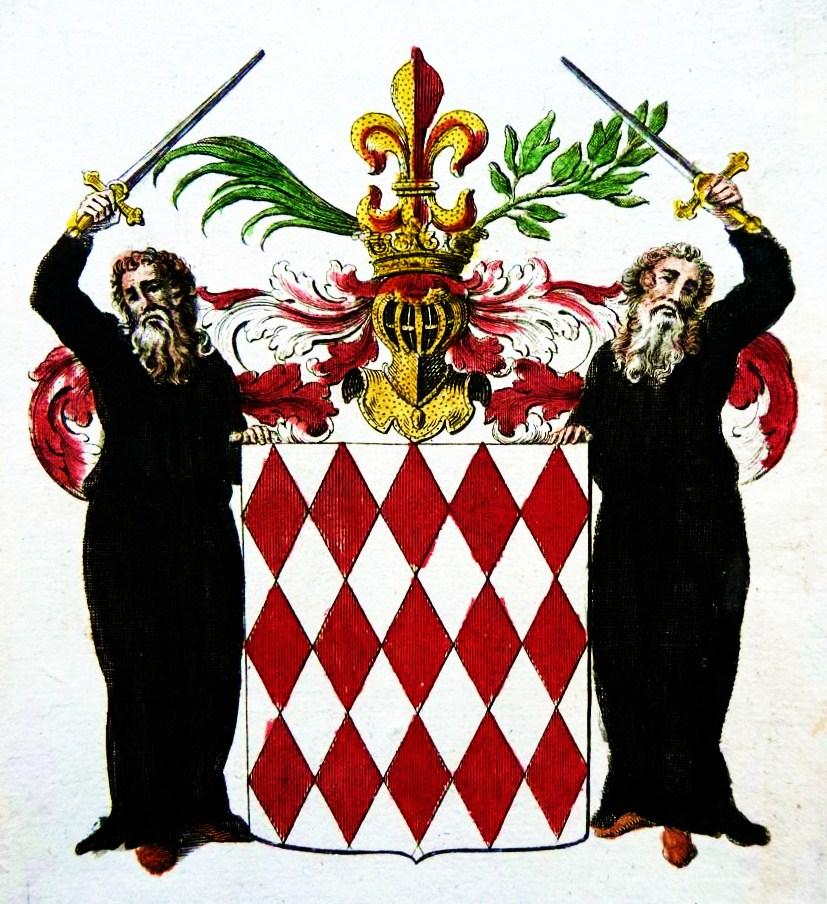

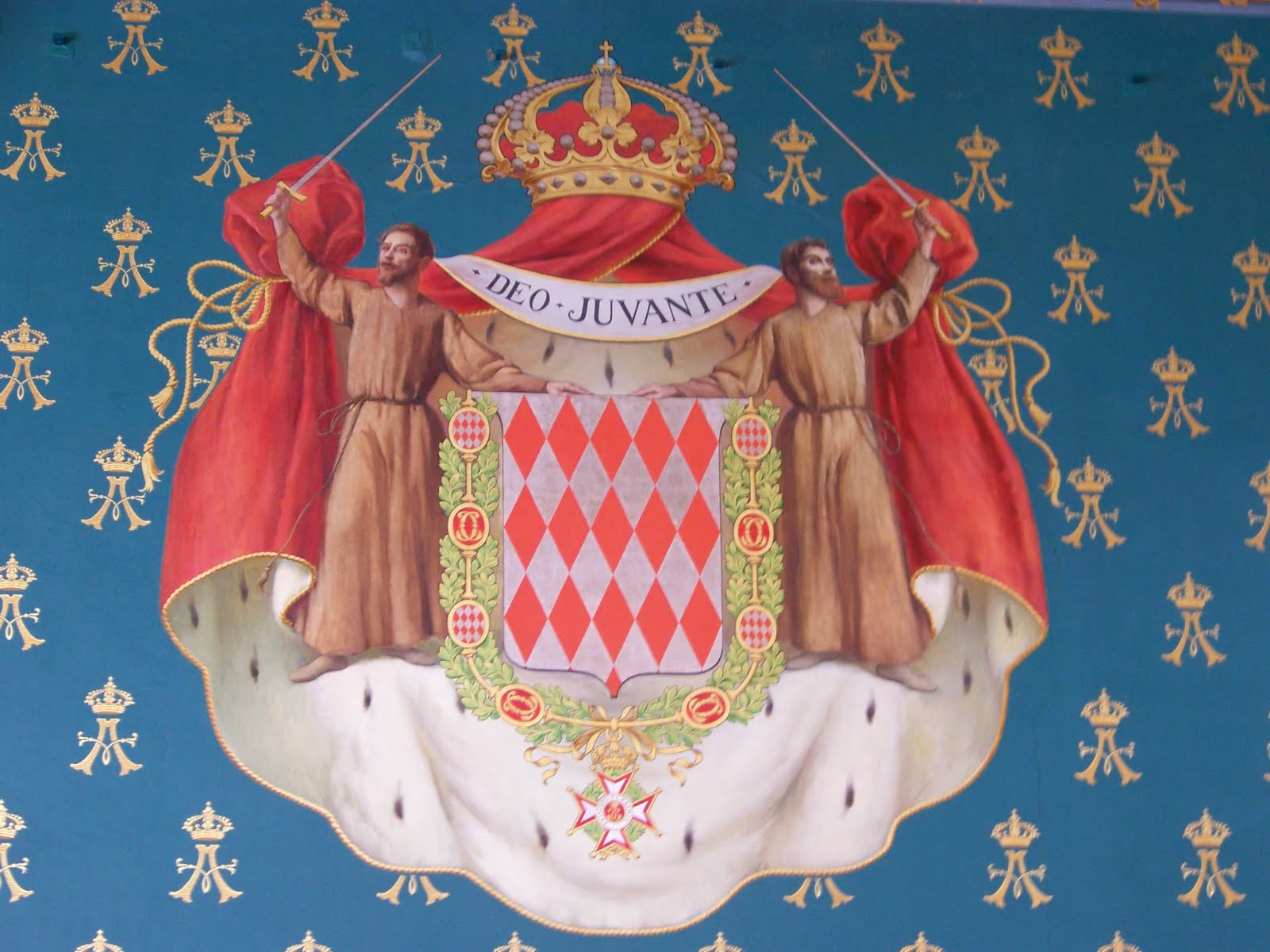
