= Rainier of Monaco =

Rainier of Monaco may refer to:

- Rainier I of Monaco, Lord of Cagnes (1267–1314)
- Rainier II, Lord of Monaco (1350–1407)
- Rainier III, Prince of Monaco (1923–2005)
