= 1357 =

Common year starting on Sunday of the Julian calendar

1357 in various calendars
- Gregorian calendar: 1357; MCCCLVII
- Ab urbe condita: 2110
- Armenian calendar: 806; ԹՎ ՊԶ
- Assyrian calendar: 6107
- Balinese saka calendar: 1278–1279
- Bengali calendar: 763–764
- Berber calendar: 2307
- English Regnal year: 30 Edw. 3 – 31 Edw. 3
- Buddhist calendar: 1901
- Burmese calendar: 719
- Byzantine calendar: 6865–6866
- Chinese calendar: 丙申年 (Fire Monkey); 4054 or 3847 — to — 丁酉年 (Fire Rooster); 4055 or 3848
- Coptic calendar: 1073–1074
- Discordian calendar: 2523
- Ethiopian calendar: 1349–1350
- Hebrew calendar: 5117–5118
- Hindu calendars
- Vikram Samvat: 1413–1414
- Shaka Samvat: 1278–1279
- Kali Yuga: 4457–4458
- Holocene calendar: 11357
- Igbo calendar: 357–358
- Iranian calendar: 735–736
- Islamic calendar: 758–759
- Japanese calendar: Enbun 2 (延文２年)
- Javanese calendar: 1269–1270
- Julian calendar: 1357; MCCCLVII
- Korean calendar: 3690
- Minguo calendar: 555 before ROC 民前555年
- Nanakshahi calendar: −111
- Thai solar calendar: 1899–1900
- Tibetan calendar: མེ་ཕོ་སྤྲེ་ལོ་ (male Fire-Monkey); 1483 or 1102 or 330 — to — མེ་མོ་བྱ་ལོ་ (female Fire-Bird); 1484 or 1103 or 331

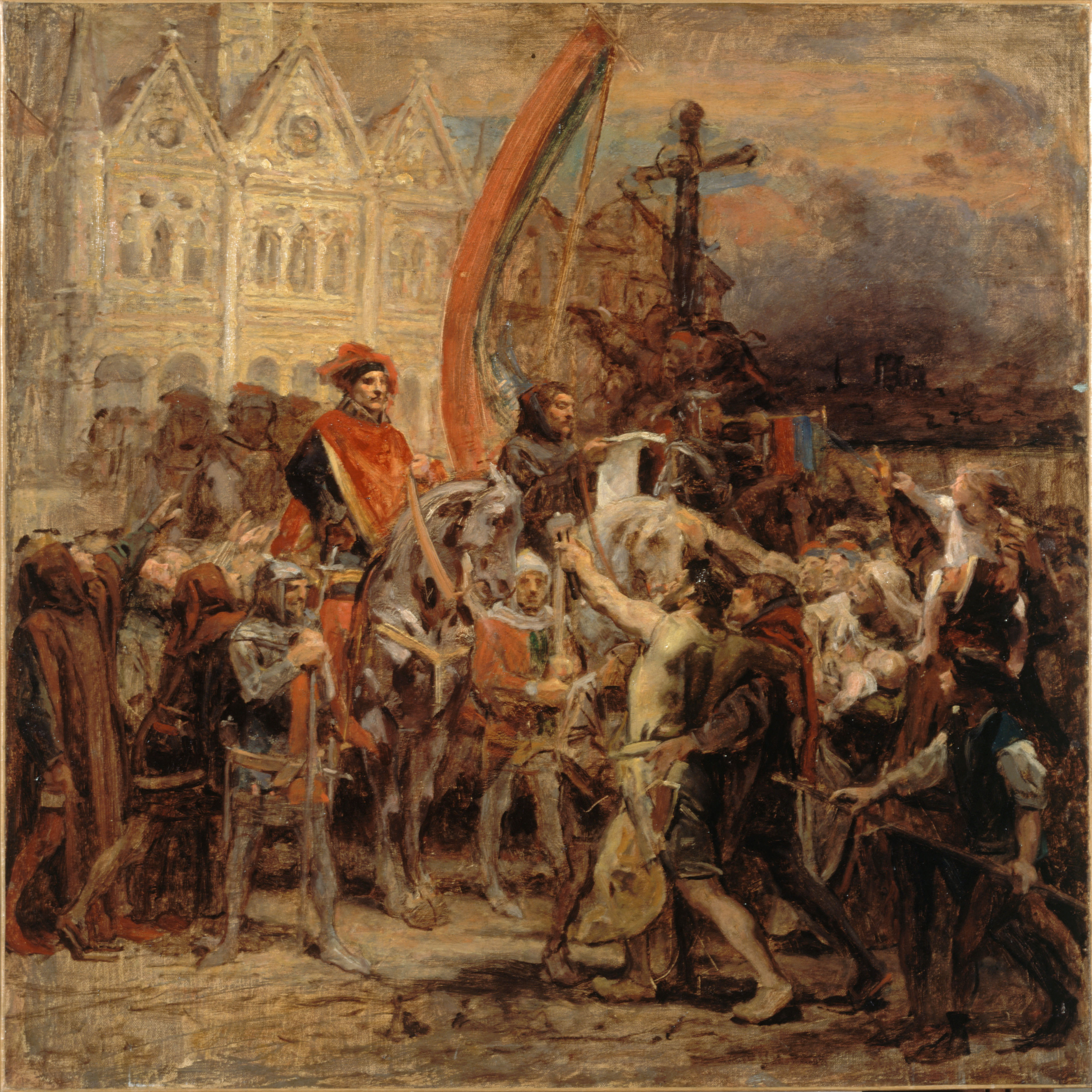
February 3: The Grand Ordinance of 1357 is passed by the Estates General of France.

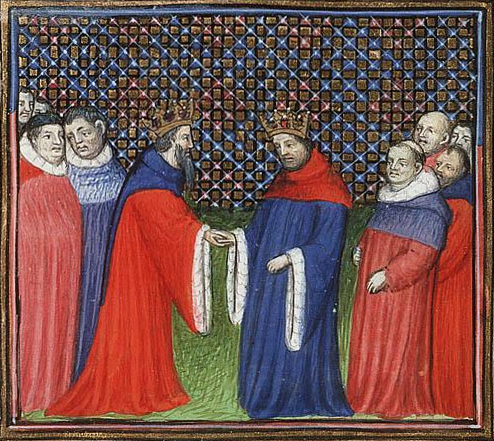
October 3: King David II of Scotland (right) is released by King Edward III of England (left) after 11 years as a prisoner of war.

Year 1357 (MCCCLVII) was a common year starting on Sunday of the Julian calendar.

== Events ==
=== January–March ===
- January 7 – The Diet of Metz, which had been convened in the French city by the Holy Roman Emperor Charles V on November 17, is closed after two months.
- February 3 – The Estates General in France meets and passes Étienne Marcel's Great Ordinance in an attempt to impose limits on the monarchy, in particular in fiscal and monetary matters.
- February 15 – King Edward III summons the English Parliament and directs its members to assemble at Westminster on April 17, 1357.
- March 16 – Brancaleone Doria of the Republic of Genoa, who will gain control of most of the island of Sardinia, agrees to become a vassal of King Pedro of Aragon, the nominal King of Sardinia, in order to be recognized as owner of the Doria ancestral lands and castles of northern Sardinia, and the lordships of Castelgenovese, Monteleone, Castel Doria, Nucara, Cabuabbbas, Anglona and Bisarcio.
- March 21 – ("first day of the third month of the 17th year of the Zhizheng era", the third month corresponding to March 21 to April 19, 1357) The Ispah rebellion by Persian Shia Muslims in Yuan dynasty China begins. Rebels led by Sayf ad-Din and Amir ad-Din take control of the city.
- March 23 – Edward the Black Prince, who has been residing in France with his men at English-controlled Bordeaux and is the eldest son of King Edward III of England, concludes a two-year truce with France in order to be able to return home after the Battle of Poitiers.

=== April–June ===
- April 6 – King Jean II of France, acting from his imprisonment at Bordeaux, overules the Great Ordinance that had been approved on February 3 by the Estates General.
- April 17 – The English Parliament assembles at Westminster for a 29-day session.
- April 28 – Erik Magnusson is recognized as king of most of Sweden, in opposition to his father, King Magnus. The action takes place at a meeting of the Swedish nobility at Jönköping, and Erik is granted control of Finland, Scania, the southern half of Halland, and other parts of the Kingdom of Sweden.
- May 17 – The English Parliament adjourns and King Edward III gives royal assent to numerous acts of legislation passed, including a confirmation of the Great Charter and the Charter of the Forest, including regulations for the sale and pricing of dogger-fish and for herrings, the Default of Victuallers in London Act, regulations defining the measurement and the contents of a tun (252 wine gallons, now equivalent to 954 liters).
- May 24 – Edward the Black Prince returns to London in triumph with his prisoner of war from the Battle of Poitiers, King Jean II of France.
- May 28 – King Pedro the Just becomes King of Portugal, after the death of his father, King Afonso the Brave.
- June 4 – The War of the Brabantian Succession, a conflict over the successor to the late Jan III of the Duchy of Brabant, comes to an end almost a year after it began on June 15, 1356, when the Peace of Ath is signed between the belligerents after being brokered by Willem III, Count of Hainaut.

=== July–September ===
- July 9 – Construction formally begins on Charles Bridge in Prague.
- July 22 – On the death of Jani Beg, he is succeeded as Khan of the Blue Horde by his son Berdi Beg who orders the death of at least 12 of his close kinsmen to secure his position.
- July 26 – (8 Sha'ban 758 AH) A Mamluk assassin attacks Sheikh Al-Omari Al-Nasiri, the chief minister of the Sultan Al-Nasir Hasan of Egypt, and severely injures him with a sword.
- August 15 – What is now the Principality of Monaco comes under the control of the Republic of Genoa and the Geonese Doge Simone Boccanegra, upon the death of the Lord Charles of the House of Grimaldi. Boccanegra removes the co-ruler, Antoine Grimaldi, from office.
- September 26 – The Scottish Parliament approves the agreement to pay a ransom for the return of King David II.

=== October–December ===
- October 3 – The Treaty of Berwick ends the Second War of Scottish Independence and King David II of Scotland is released by the English in return for a ransom of 100,000 marks at a rate of 10,000 marks per year for ten years.
- November 6 – Meeting at Scone, the Scottish Parliament votes to ratify the Treaty of Berwick and King David II returns home after 11 years.
- November 9 – King Carlos II of Navarre, held prisoner in Paris by King Jean II of France after being arrested on April 5, 1356, is rescued from his cell at the Arleux Castle in an operation by 30 men under the guidance of Jean de Picquigny, Viceroy of Languedoc.
- November 21 – (26 Dhu'l-Qa'da 758 AH) Sheikh Al-Omari Al-Nasiri dies from his injuries four months after being wounded by an assassin.
- December 15 – King Edward III summons the English Parliament and directs its members to assemble at Westminster on February 5.

=== Date unknown ===
- The Blue Horde unseats Ghazan II as the ruler of the Il-Khanate, and appoints their own governor.
- Battle of Bubat: The Sundanese royal family is massacred by the Majapahit Army on the orders of Gajah Mada; the death toll includes Sundanese King Lingga Buana and Princess Dyah Pitaloka Citraresmi, who commits suicide.
- Rao Kanhadev becomes Rathore ruler of Marwar (part of modern-day India).
- Construction started on Charles Bridge in Prague.
- Influenza is first identified as a disease.
- The first public exhibition of the Shroud of Turin is recorded.
- The Wat Phra Si Rattana Mahathat (Famous Wat Yai) Temple is constructed in Phitsanulok, Thailand.

== Births ==
- April 11 – King John I of Portugal (d. 1433)
- date unknown
  - Art mac Art MacMurrough-Kavanagh, King of Leinster (d. 1417)
  - Hugo von Montfort, Austrian minstrel (d. 1423)
  - Anna of Trebizond, Queen of Georgia (d. 1406)
  - Fang Xiaoru, Confucian scholar (d. 1402)
  - Je Tsongkhapa, founder of the Geluk school of Tibetan Buddhism (d. 1419)

== Deaths ==
- January 18 – Maria of Portugal, infanta (b. 1313)
- May 28 – King Afonso IV of Portugal (b. 1291)
- July 13 – Bartolus de Saxoferrato, Italian jurist (b. 1313)
- date unknown
  - Usman Serajuddin, court scholar of the Bengal Sultanate (b. 1258)
  - Ziauddin Barani, historian and political thinker of the Delhi Sultanate (b. 1285)
  - Jani Beg, Khan of the Blue Horde
  - Kazerouni, Masoud, Persian physician
  - Rao Tida, Rathore ruler of Marwar
