= Louis, Lord of Monaco =

Lord of Monaco from 1395 to 1402

Louis Grimaldi
- Lord of Monaco
- Reign: 1395–1402
- Predecessor: Charles I, Anthony I, Gabriel, and Rainier II
- Successor: Jean I, Anthony II, and Ambroise
- Born: Unknown
- Died: 5 November 1402
- House: House of Grimaldi
- Father: Charles I of Monaco
- Mother: Lucchina Spinola

Louis Grimaldi (died 5 November 1402) was Lord of Monaco from 1395 to 1402, although he was held captive by the Genoese from December 1395 to May 1397.

== Notes ==
Louis, Lord of Monaco House of Grimaldi Born: ? Died: 1402
| Preceded by Charles I, Anthony I, Gabriel and Rainier II | Lord of Monaco; 1395–1402 | Succeeded by Jean I, Anthony II and Ambroise |
