= Gabriel, Lord of Monaco =

Lord of Monaco (1352-1357)

Gabriele Grimaldi (13?? – after 1357) was Lord of Monaco from 1352 until 1357. He was the son of Charles I and Lucchina Spinola. He ruled jointly with his father Charles I, his father's paternal uncle Antonio and his brother Rainier II.

Gabriel, Lord of Monaco House of Grimaldi Born: 13? Died: 1358
Preceded by Charles I	Lord of Monaco; Jointly with Charles I, Rainier II and Anthony I: 1352–1357	Succeeded by Louis I and Jean I
