= Oberto Grimaldi =

Genoese admiral

Oberto Grimaldi was an admiral of the Genoese fleet at Damietta and commissioner of Genoa. Grimaldi was one of the four sons of Grimaldo Canella and, therefore, one of the grandsons of Otto Canella.

The historian Gustave Saige wrote that Oberto Grimaldi was "one of the greatest personages" of the Republic of Genoa. He and his brother-in-law, Oberto Spinola, founded Genoa's Church of St. Luke.

Oberto was married to Conradina Spinola, and was the first of the family known to use the patronymic Grimaldi (as in "Oberto son of Grimaldo").
