= Anthony I of Monaco =

Lord of Monaco (1352-1357)

Anthony I (13?? – 1358) was Lord of Monaco from 1352 until 1357. He was the youngest brother of Rainier I of Monaco, Lord of Cagnes. He ruled jointly with his nephew Charles I and his nephew's sons, Rainier II and Gabriele.

== Notes ==
Anthony I of Monaco House of Grimaldi Born: 13? Died: 1358
Preceded by Charles I	Lord of Monaco; Jointly with Charles I, Rainier II and Gabriele: 1352–1357	Succeeded by Louis I and Jean I
