= Rainier II =

Rainier II may refer to:

- Rainier II of Hainaut (890–932)
- Rainier II, Lord of Monaco (1350–1407)
