= Monégasque franc =

Currency of Monaco before 1995

franc monégasque (French)
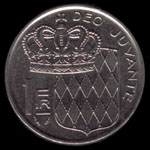
- 1978 1 Monégasque franc (reverse)

ISO 4217
- Code: None (MCF unofficial)

Unit
- Symbol: fr. or F

Denominations
- Subunit
- 1/100: centime
- Coins: 1, 5, 10, 20, 50 centimes, 1/2, 1, 2, 5, 10, 20 francs

Demographics
- User(s): None, previously: Monaco, France, Andorra

Issuance
- Mint: Monnaie de Paris
- Website: www.monnaiedeparis.com

Valuation
- Pegged with: French franc at par
- This infobox shows the latest status before this currency was rendered obsolete.

The franc (unofficially MCF) was the official currency of the Principality of Monaco until 1995 (de facto, 1996 de jure), when it changed to the French franc which was replaced by the euro in 2002. The franc was subdivided into 100 centimes or 10 décimes. The Monégasque franc circulated alongside the French franc with the same value. Like the French franc, the Monégasque franc was revalued in 1960 at a rate of 100 old francs = 1 new franc. The official euro-to-franc exchange rate was MCF 6.55957 to EUR 1.

Today, Monégasque coins have only numismatic value, including the fleurs de coins, or proof-like coins. The period for exchange of the coins for euros has expired.

The Monégasque franc was legal tender in Monaco, France and Andorra.

== Coins ==
Monaco's first decimal coins were issued in 1837 and 1838, in denominations of 5 centimes, 1 decime and 5 francs. The 5 centimes and 1 decime were minted in both copper and brass and were the same size as the earlier French coins (France was not minting these denominations at the time) whilst the 5 francs matched the French coin. No further issues were made until 1879, from when gold franc coins were issued until 1904.

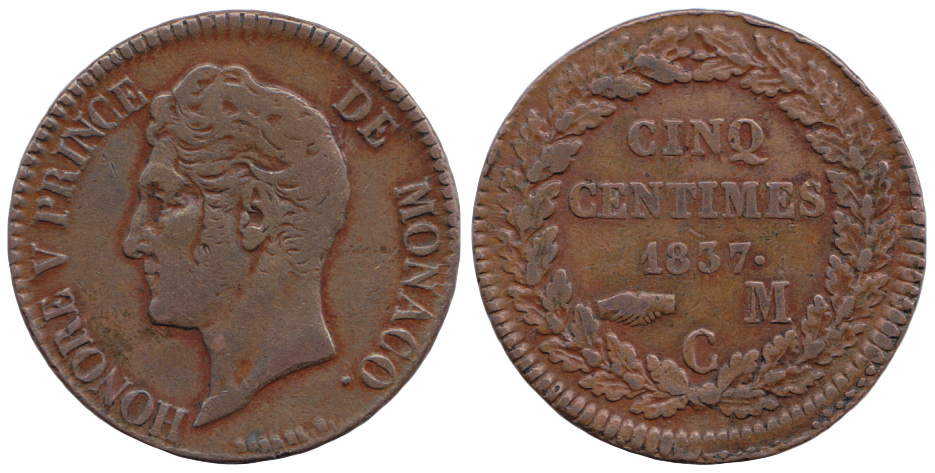
5 centimes 1837, Honoré V

Between 1924 and 1926, aluminium-bronze 50 centimes, 1 and 2 francs were issued of the same size as the French coins. In 1943, aluminium 1 and 2 francs were introduced followed by aluminium-bronze versions in 1945, alongside aluminium 5 francs. In 1946, cupronickel 10 francs were introduced, followed by 20 francs in 1947, a coin to which there was no corresponding French coin. In 1950, aluminium-bronze 10, 20 and 50 francs and cupro-nickel 100 francs were issued, with the size of the 100 francs reduced to match the French coin in 1956.

When the franc was revalued in 1960, Monaco issued nickel 1 franc and silver 5 franc coins. In 1962, aluminium-bronze 10, 20, and 50 centime coins were added, followed by nickel 1/2 franc coins in 1965, nickel-clad cupronickel 5 francs in 1971, nickel-brass 10 francs in 1974, stainless steel 1 centime and aluminium-bronze 5 centimes in 1976, bi-metallic 10 francs in 1989, and tri-metallic 20 francs 1992, respectively. All of these coins matched the sizes and compositions of corresponding French coins.

Coins of the Monégasque franc ("Old franc (Ancien franc) issue")
Image	Value	Technical parameters				Description			Date of first minting
Image	Value	Diameter	Thickness	Mass	Composition	Edge	Obverse	Reverse	Date of first minting
	50 centimes	18 mm		2 g	Aluminum-bronze	Reeded	Crowned monogram of Louis II, Hercules with bow	Sword, coat of arms of the House of Grimaldi	1924
	1 franc	23 mm		4 g	Aluminum-bronze	Reeded	Crowned monogram of Louis II, Hercules with bow	Sword, coat of arms of the House of Grimaldi	1924
	1 franc	22.9 mm	1.5 mm	1.3 g	Aluminum	Smooth	Louis II	Coat of arms of Monaco	1943
	1 franc	23 mm	1.55 mm	4 g	Aluminum-bronze	Smooth	Louis II	Coat of arms of Monaco	1945
	2 francs	27 mm	2 mm	2.25 g	Aluminum	Smooth	Louis II	Coat of arms of Monaco	1943
	2 francs	27 mm	2 mm	8 g	Aluminum-bronze	Smooth	Louis II	Coat of arms of Monaco	1945
	5 francs	31 mm	2.4 mm	3.7 g	Aluminum	Smooth	Louis II	Coat of arms of Monaco	1945
	10 francs	26.1 mm	1.8 mm	7 g	Copper-nickel	Reeded	Louis II	Coat of arms of Monaco between olive sprigs	1946
	10 francs	20 mm	1.5 mm	3 g	Aluminum-bronze	Smooth	Rainier III	Crowned shield, text "10 FRS", "DEO JUVANTE"	1950
	20 francs	30 mm	2.05 mm	10 g	Copper-nickel	Reeded	Louis II	Coat of arms of Monaco between olive sprigs	1947
	20 francs	23.5 mm	1.6 mm	4.1 g	Aluminum-bronze	Smooth	Rainier III	Crowned shield, text "20 FRS", "DEO JUVANTE"	1950
	50 francs	27 mm	2 mm	8 g	Aluminum-bronze	Smooth	Rainier III	Armoured equestrian, text "DEO JUVANTE", "50 FRANCS"	1950
	100 francs	30 mm	2.40 mm	12 g	Copper-nickel	Reeded	Rainier III	Armoured equestrian, text "DEO JUVANTE", "100 FRANCS"	1950
	100 francs	24 mm		6 g	Copper-nickel	Reeded	Rainier III	Crowned shield, text "DEO JUVANTE", "100 FRANCS"	1956

Coins of the Monégasque franc ("New franc (Nouveau franc) issue")
Image	Value	Technical parameters				Description			Date of first minting
Image	Value	Diameter	Thickness	Mass	Composition	Edge	Obverse	Reverse	Date of first minting
	1 centime	15 mm	1.5 mm	1.65 g	Stainless steel	Smooth	Coat of arms of Monaco; text "PRINCIPAUTE DE MONACO"	Olive sprig; denomination "1 Cme"; year of issue	1976
	5 centimes	17 mm		2 g	Aluminum-bronze	Smooth	Rainier III	Armoured friar; text "5 CENTIMES"; "DEO JUVANTE"	1962
	10 centimes	20 mm	1.38 mm	3 g	Aluminum-bronze	Smooth	Rainier III	Armoured friar; text "10 CENTIMES"; "DEO JUVANTE"	1962
	20 centimes	23.5 mm	1.4 mm	4 g	Aluminum-bronze	Smooth	Rainier III	Armoured friar; text "20 CENTIMES"; "DEO JUVANTE"	1962
	50 centimes	25 mm	2 mm	7 g	Aluminum-bronze	Smooth	Rainier III	Armoured friar; text "50 CENTIMES"; "DEO JUVANTE"	1962
	1/2 franc	19.5 mm	2 mm	4.5 g	Nickel	Reeded	Rainier III	Crown overlapping shield; text "1/2 FR"; "DEO JUVANTE"	1965
	1 franc	24 mm	2 mm	6 g	Nickel	Reeded	Rainier III	Crown overlapping shield; text "1 FR"; "DEO JUVANTE"	1960
	2 francs	26.5 mm		7.5 g	Nickel	Reeded	Rainier III	Monogram of Rainier III	1979
	5 francs	29 mm		12 g	.835 silver	Reeded	Rainier III	Coat of arms of Monaco; text "5 F"; "DEO JUVANTE"	1960
	5 francs	29 mm	2 mm	10 g	Copper-nickel	Reeded	Rainier III	Monogram of Rainier III	1971
	10 francs	26 mm		10 g	Copper-aluminum-nickel	Reeded	Rainier III	Monogram of Rainier III superimposed on the coat of arms of Monaco	1975
	10 francs	23 mm	2.13 mm	6.5 g	Bi-metallic (Nickel center in an aluminum-bronze ring)	Segmented (Plain and reeded sections)	Armoured knight; text "DEO JUVANTE"	Denomination and monogram of Rainier III; text "PRINCIPAUTÉ DE MONACO"; "10F"	1989
	20 francs	26.8 mm	0.3 mm	9 g	Tri-metallic (Aluminum-bronze center plug, with a nickel middle ring and an aluminum-bronze outer ring)		Prince's Palace ("Palais Princier"); text "DEO JUVANTE"	Denomination and monogram of Rainier III; text "PRINCIPAUTÉ DE MONACO"; "20F"	1992

== Banknotes ==
The only Monégasque banknotes are dated 20 MARS 1920. There was an initial emergency issuance of 25 and 50 centime and 1 franc notes on 28 April 1920, followed by a second issued of 25 centime and 1 franc notes with different color schemes. The violet 25 centime notes are available with and without embossing, which was used to validate the notes, but the process was soon discontinued as a cost-cutting measure. The embossed notes have a crowned shield with diamond pattern at center, encircled by the text Principauté de Monaco, and are available with circles of two different diameters.

== See also ==
- Monégasque euro coins
