= François Grimaldi =

1309 Genoese nobleman; leader of the Guelphs

- Lord of Monaco
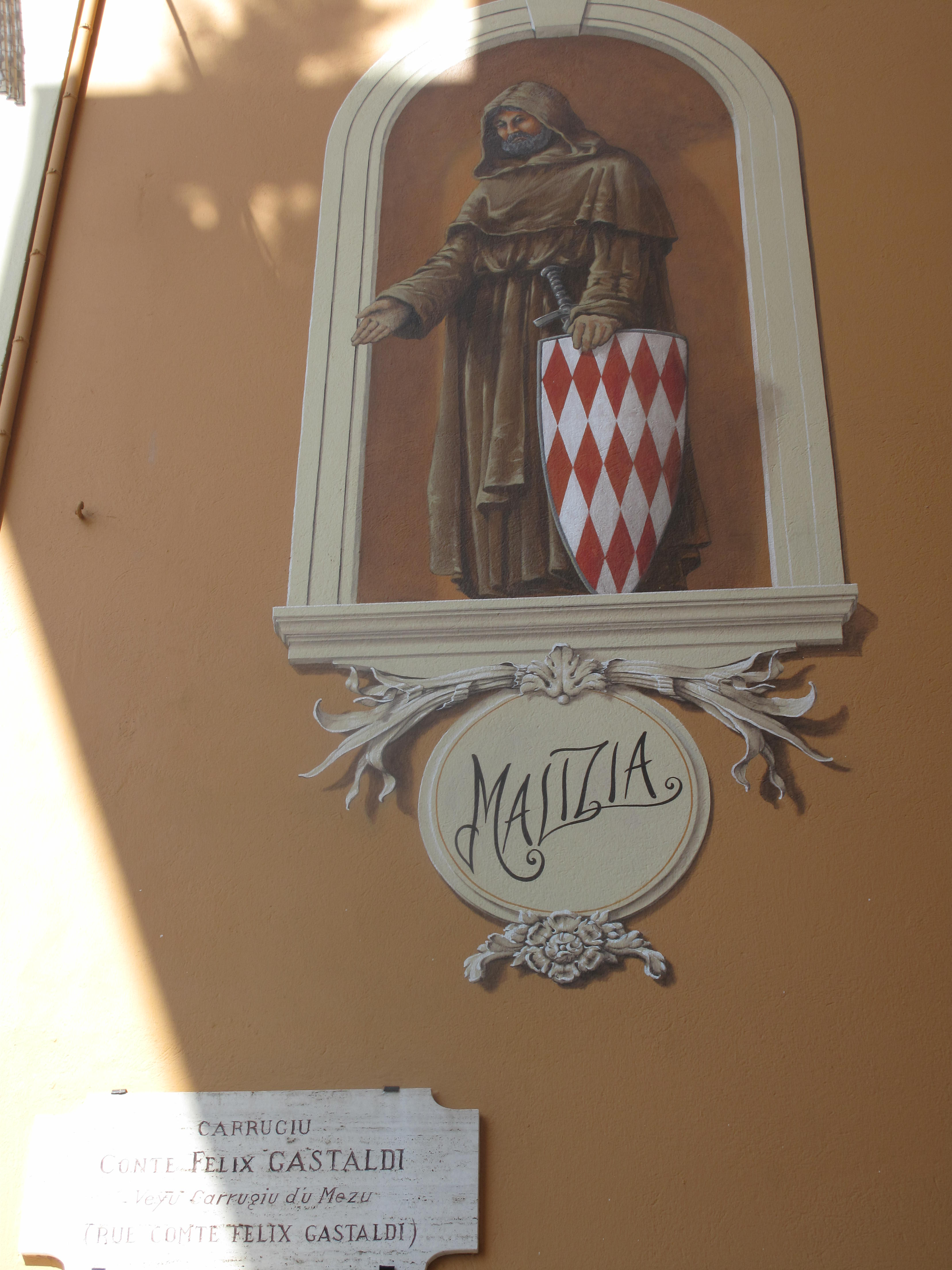
- Fresco with François Grimaldi, nickname "Malizia", on a wall of the rue Comte Félix Castaldi in Monaco
- Born: c. 12?? Genoa, Republic of Genoa
- Died: 1309; Ventimiglia, Republic of Genoa
- Noble family: House of Grimaldi
- Spouse: Aurelia del Carretto
- Father: Guglielmo Grimaldi
- Mother: Giacoba

Francesco Grimaldi (French: François; English: Francis), called il Malizia (from Italian: "the malicious") was the Genoese leader of the Guelphs who captured the Rock of Monaco on the night of 8 January 1297. He was the son of Guglielmo Grimaldi by his wife Giacobina or Giacoba, a Genoese noble.

== Capture of Monaco ==
The capture of Monaco happened at a time during a long conflict in medieval Italy between the Guelphs and Ghibellines. The Guelph and Ghibelline members were of two opposing factions in German and Italian politics during the Middle Ages, which sparked conflict that would last centuries and contributed to chronic strife within the cities of Northern Italy spanning over the course of the 13th and 14th century. The house Grimaldi was one of the most influential and powerful families in Genoa having allegiance to the Pope, against Ghibelline support of the Holy Roman Emperor. In 1295, Guelph forces from Liguria led by Francesco Grimaldi, were routed by a successful advance from the Ghibelline army and were forced to take refuge on the Rock of Monaco. The assault culminated two years later on January 8, 1297, when Grimaldi, dressed as a Franciscan friar, lead a small contingent of followers and was greeted at the gates of Monaco's castle, only then to seize the castle with his cousin Rainier I, Lord of Cagnes. The event is commemorated on the Monegasque coat of arms, represented as two friars brandishing swords with the motto "Deo Juvante" which translates as "With the Help of God."

The citadel of Monaco was held for four years until the Ghibelline stronghold was compromised over time under prolonged Genoese attack. Francesco thus failed to establish the Grimaldis' rule over Monaco, in this instance, but this was the first attempt to do so. The Grimaldi family subsequently resolved to regain the territory due to its advantageous potential as a base for the maritime trade business; responsible for the family's generational affluence.

== Family ==
The Grimaldi lineage descended from Grimaldo Canella. Originating from Genoa, Grimaldo was a twelfth-century statesman and served as Consul of Genoa several times, whose forename adorned his predecessors; becoming the family's accepted surname.

Francesco was married in 1295 to Aurelia del Carretto, widow of his cousin, Lanfranco Grimaldi. The marriage was childless, thus the modern Grimaldis are therefore not descendants of Francesco. After his death, in 1309, he was succeeded by his cousin (and stepson), Rainier I of Monaco, Lord of Cagnes.

His cousin's descendants, the Grimaldi family, still rule Monaco today. Over one hundred years after the coup, the Grimaldis purchased Monaco from the crown of Aragon in 1419, and became the official and undisputed rulers of "the Rock of Monaco". Rainier Il's three sons-Ambroise, Antoine and Jean purchased Monaco in the name of Grimaldi from its then owner, Queen Yolande of Aragon.

== Sources ==
- Françoise de Bernardy, Princes of Monaco: the remarkable history of the Grimaldi family, ed. Barker, 1961.
