= Gustave Saige =

French archivist

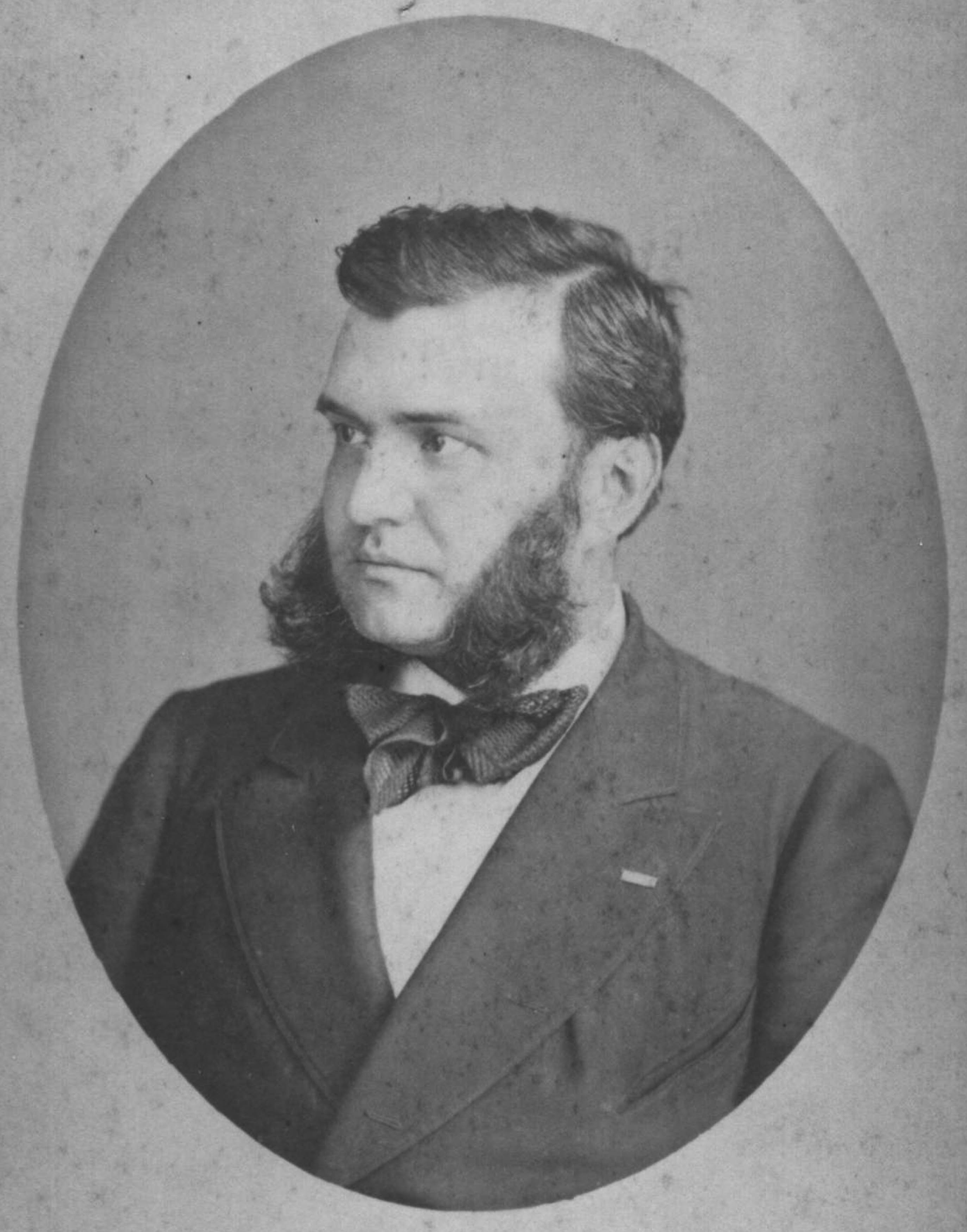
- Born: Gustave, Marie, Joseph, Jules Saige; 20 August 1838; Paris, France
- Died: 5 December 1905 (aged 67); Monaco
- Education: École Nationale des Chartes
- Occupation: Archivist

Gustave Saige (1838–1905) was a French archivist. He was the archivist of the Prince's Palace of Monaco from 1881 to 1905.

== Early life ==
Gustave Saige was born on 20 August 1838 in Paris, France. He graduated from the École Nationale des Chartes in 1862, where his classmates included Paul Viollet and Gaston Paris.

== Career ==
Saige served as the archivist of the Prince's Palace of Monaco from 1881 to 1905. It was Saige who discovered that the House of Grimaldi descended from Otto Canella, not Grimaldi I, Lord of Antibes. However, his research was not published under the reign of Charles III, Prince of Monaco. When Albert I, Prince of Monaco came to power in 1889, Saige was able to publish it. By 1895, the Almanach de Gotha had updated its entry on the House of Grimaldi with Otto Canella as its founder.

Additionally, Saige was a member of the Council of State. He was a correspondent to the Académie des Inscriptions et Belles-Lettres.

Saige was the author of many books about the Languedoc and Monaco. His Les Juifs du Languedoc antérieurement au XIVe siècle is a "classic archival [study] of Jewish life in Languedoc" prior to the 14th century. Additionally, Saige intended to work on the history of Jews in Toulouse, but he died before he was able to write about it.

Saige was a Knight of the Legion of Honour and Grand Officer of the Order of Saint-Charles.

== Personal life ==
Saige was married.

== Death ==
Saige died on 5 December 1905 in Monaco. He was sixty-seven years old. After his death, he was succeeded as the archivist of the Prince's Palace of Monaco by Léon-Honoré Labande.

== Bibliography ==
=== As an author ===
- Une Alliance défensive entre propriétaires allodiaux au XIIe siècle (Paris: A. Franck, 1861).
- Les Juifs du Languedoc antérieurement au XIVe siècle (Paris: Alphonse Picard, 1881).
- Honoré II et le palais de Monaco (Monaco: Imprimerie du Journal de Monaco, 1883).
- Les beaux-arts au Palais de Monaco avant la révolution: I. Les princes et le palais depuis le seizième siècle (Monaco: Imprimerie de Monaco, 1884).
- Les Archives du palais de Monaco et l'intérêt de ses collections pour l'histoire de France (Orléans: Imprimerie de P. Girardot, 1888).
- Documents historiques relatifs à la Principauté de Monaco (Monaco : Imprimerie de Monaco, 1888-1890).
- Abrégé de l'histoire de Monaco à l'usage des écoles de la principauté (Monaco : Imprimerie de Monaco, 1894).
- La seigneurie de Monaco au milieu du xvie siécle (Monaco: Imprimerie de Monaco, 1896).
- Monaco, ses origines et son histoire (Monaco: Imprimerie de Monaco, 1897).
- Glanes d'archives. Les Grimaldi chez eux et en voyage (Monaco, 1906).

=== As an editor ===
- François-Nicolas Baudot, sieur du Buisson et d'Aubenay, Journal des guerres civiles de 1648-1652 (publié par Gustave Saige, 2 volumes, Paris : H. Champion, Libraire de la Société de l'Histoire de Paris, 1883-1885).
