= Treaty of Péronne (1641) =

1641 treaty between France and Monaco

- Signed: September 14, 1641
- Location: Péronne, Kingdom of France
- Signatories: (Kingdom of France) Louis XIII; (Monaco) Honoré II
- Parties: Kingdom of France; Principality of Monaco

The Treaty of Péronne was signed on September 14, 1641, in Péronne, France between Honoré II, Prince of Monaco, and Louis XIII, King of France. Based on the terms of the treaty, Prince Honoré permitted Monaco to become a French protectorate in return for guarantees entailing the preservation of his rights as sovereign. Moreover, Honoré wanted to be included in all French treaties and be given grants of land in France as compensation for any privately owned territories he might lose in Habsburg Spain. Overall, the treaty led to the removal of the Spanish garrison in Monaco by the French and ultimately regulated the relations between France and Monaco for 150 years.

== Background ==
In the context of Franco-Spanish rivalry and the Thirty Years' War, the Prince of Monaco sought to get rid of Spanish tutelage. Cardinal Richelieu, Chief Minister of France, sought to take advantage of weakening Habsburg power and strengthen France by extending French influence over the Rock of Monaco.

== Main clauses ==
- The 14-article treaty removed the Prince of Monaco from Spanish protection, instead accepting the protection of the king of France. Article 6 provided for France to recognise the prince's sovereignty over Monaco, Menton and Roquebrune.
- A garrison of 500 men would permanently be stationed in the princely territory, at the expense of the royal treasury but placed under the direct orders of the prince, in order to protect the principality. In the absence of the prince, the command of the garrison would be entrusted to a lieutenant appointed by the king but approved by the prince.
- As protector of the prince, his family, his privileges and his property, the king of France would pay the prince an annual rent of 75,000 livres.
- With the Spanish properties of Honoré II having been confiscated by Philip IV of Spain, the king of France granted to the prince the Duchy of Valentinois, the Marquisate of Baux, the County of Carladès, the city of Chabeuil, the Baronies of Calvinet and Buis and the Lordship of Saint-Rémy-de-Provence in compensation.
- The territorial clauses of the treaty were confirmed by letters patent awarded at Saint-Germain-en-Laye in February 1643.

== See also ==
- List of treaties

== Sources ==
- Duursma, Jorri C. Fragmentation and the International Relations of Micro-states: Self-determination and Statehood. Cambridge University Press, 1996. ISBN 0-521-56360-7
- The Gentleman's Magazine (printed by F. Jefferies), 1900.
