= Anthony II of Monaco =

Lord of Monaco from 1419 to 1427

Anthony II (c. 13?? – 1427) was Lord of Monaco from 1419 until 1427. He ruled jointly with his brothers Jean I and Ambroise.

== Notes ==
Anthony II of Monaco House of Grimaldi Born: ? Died: 1427
Preceded by Louis I	Lord of Monaco; Jointly with Jean I and Ambroise: 1419–1427	Succeeded by Jean I
