= Charles I of Monaco =

Lord of Monaco from 1331 to 1357

Charles I

Lord of Monaco
- Reign: 1331–1357
- Died: 15 August 1357
- Spouse: Lucchina Spinola
- Issue: Louis, Lord of Monaco; Rainier II, Lord of Monaco; Francesco; Gabriel, Lord of Monaco; Charles; Lancelot; Ruffo; Anastasia
- House: House of Grimaldi
- Father: Rainier I
- Mother: Salvatica del Carretto

Charles I of Monaco (Note: Also Charles Grimaldi or Carlo Grimaldi) (died 15 August 1357), Lord of Monaco, was a 14th century soldier and noble. He was a member of the Grimaldi dynasty.

== Biography ==
The oldest son of Rainier I by his first wife, Salvatica del Carretto, Charles was forced to flee into exile following the Rock of Monaco falling into Genoese control on April 10, 1301.

He was appointed Admiral of France.

After thirty years of Genoese rule, Charles retook the Rock on 12 September 1331, and ruled until his death, when the Rock was again conquered by the Genoese army.

Also he was Baron of San Demetrio, in the Kingdom of Naples.

In 1346 he acquired the Lordship of Menton and, in 1355, he conquered the Lordship of Roquebrune.

On 29 June 1352, Charles designed a co-rulership of Monaco between his uncle Antonio (his father's youngest brother), and his own sons, Rainier II and Gabriele.

== Family ==
Charles I married Lucchina Spinola, a daughter of Girardo Spinola, Lord of Dertonne. They had eight children:

- Louis, his successor.
- Rainier II
- Francesco
- Gabriele, married to a member of the Orsini family
- Charles, Co-Lord of Mentone; he had a son, Luca, who inherited Mentone. Luca had two sons, Pietro and Filippo, also Lords of Mentone; both brothers died without issue, and Mentone passed to the older branch of the family.
- Lancelot
- Ruffo
- Anastasia

== Notes ==
Charles I of Monaco House of Grimaldi Born: 13? Died: 1357
Preceded by None (Rainier I, controlled the lordship of Cagnes)	Lord of Monaco; Jointly with Rainier II, Anthony I and Gabriel: 1331–1357	Succeeded by Louis I and Jean I
