= Ambroise, Lord of Monaco =

Lord of Monaco from 1419 to 1427

Ambroise Grimaldi (c. 13?? – 1433) was Lord of Monaco from 1419 until 1427. He ruled jointly with his brothers Jean I and Antonie.

Ambroise, Lord of Monaco House of Grimaldi Born: ? Died: 1433
Preceded by Louis I	Lord of Monaco; Jointly with Jean I and Antonie: 1419–1427	Succeeded by Jean I
