= Vehicle registration plates of Monaco =

Principality of Monaco
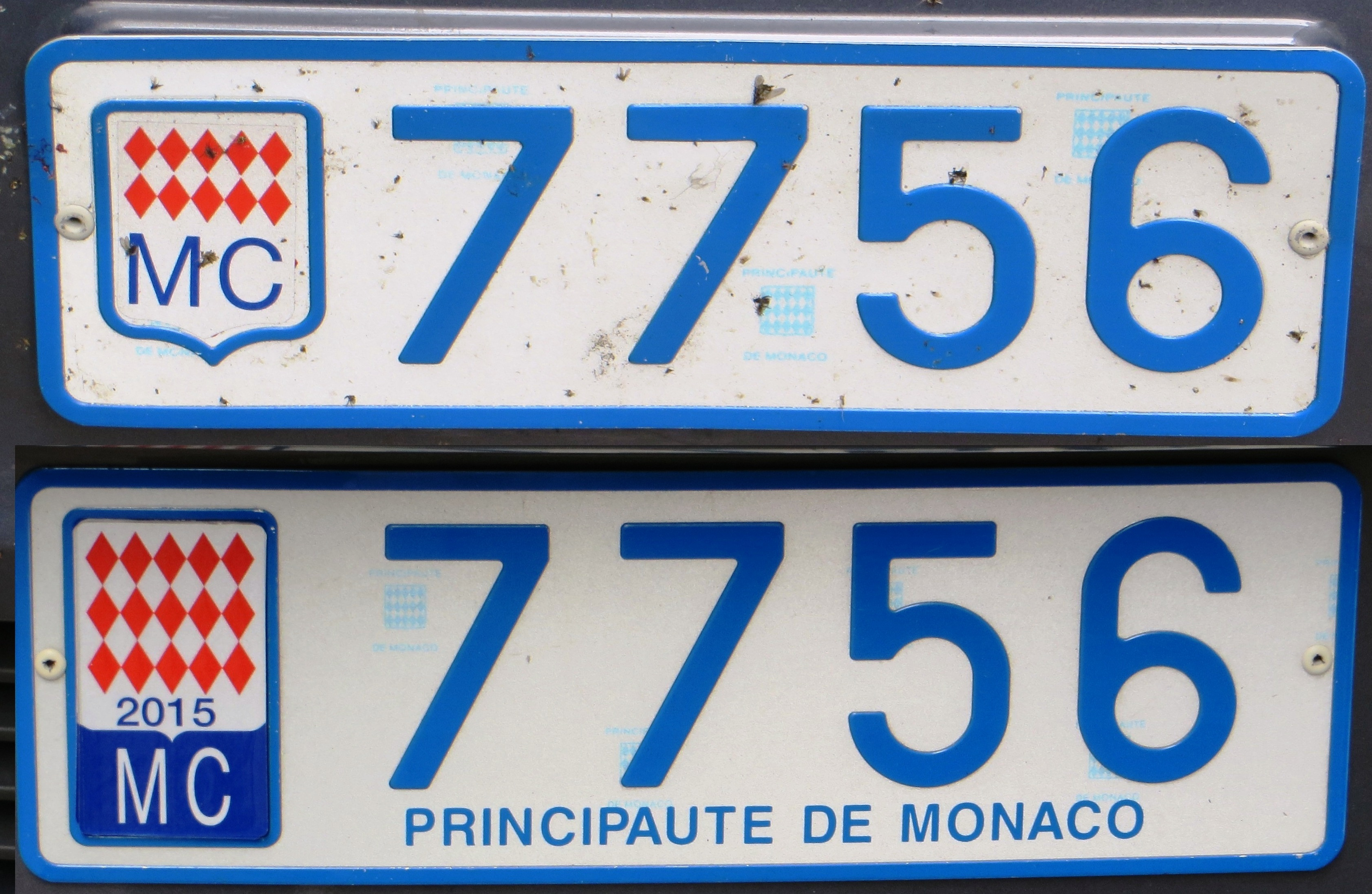
- Registration plates of Monaco (front above and rear below).
- Country: Monaco
- Country code: MC

Current series
- Slogan: Principauté de Monaco (rear only)
- Size: 340 mm × 110 mm 13.4 in × 4.3 in (rear plate) 260 mm × 90 mm 10.2 in × 3.5 in (front plate)
- Serial format: One letter and three digits or four digits or three digits and one letter
- Colour (front): Light blue on white
- Colour (rear): Light blue on white

Number plates of Monaco are used to identify registered vehicles in Monaco. The plates are 260 by 110 millimeters, making them significantly smaller than most other European countries, and contain four ciphers and/or letters. The number plates have a blue font on a white background and have the coat of arms of Monaco on the left side with the country code (MC) below. The rear plates also contain the annum number to attest that tax has been paid between the coat of arms and country code and "Principauté de Monaco" ("Principality of Monaco" in French) in blue below the serial. All plates starting with 000 belong to the family of Albert II, Prince of Monaco.

== Special plates ==
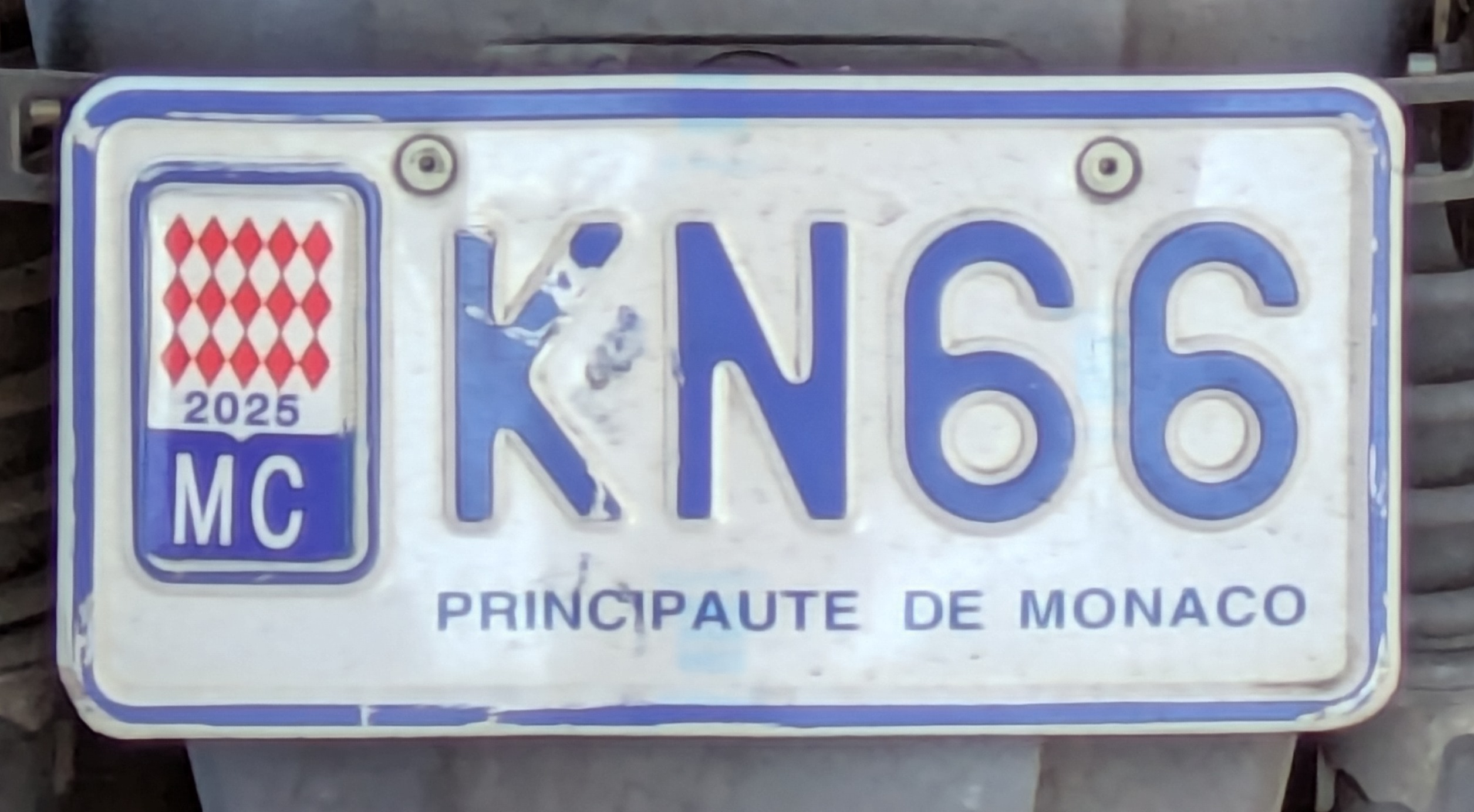
A rear motorcycle plate

- Motorcycle number plates contain two letters and two digits.
- Provisional car number plates have white font on a red background. They later have series of nnnn WW MC in same background before 1979.
- Pending number plates have series of nnnn WWn MC, in the same background before 1979.
- Diplomatic number plates have the prefix CC or CD, and are respectively lettered blue and green. Italian consulate-general have CC in middle.
- International Atomic Energy Agency and the International Hydrographic Bureau number plates have white font on a green background.
- Tourist number plates have red font on a white background. The number plates are prefixed TT.
- Royal Family number plates have three ciphers to as a prefix. They have a different coat of arms.
- In 1997, Prince Rainier III was given the number plate AN 1997.
