= Jean I of Monaco =

Jean I
- Lord of Monaco
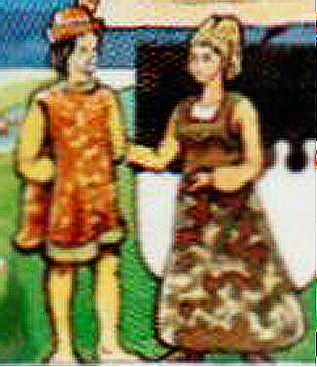
- Born: c. 1382
- Died: 8 May 1454
- Spouse: Pomellina Fregoso
- Issue: Catalan, Lord of Monaco
- Father: Rainier II, Lord of Monaco
- Mother: Isabella Asinari

Jean I Grimaldi (Giovanni I Grimaldi) (c. 1382 – 1454) was Lord of Monaco three times: as co-ruler with Louis in 1395; as co-ruler with his brothers Ambroise and Anthony II from 1419 to 1427; and as sole ruler from 1427 until 1454. He died on 8 May 1454, aged 71 or 72, and was succeeded by his son Catalan I Grimaldi.

== Sources ==
Jean I of Monaco House of Grimaldi Born: c. 1382 Died: 1454
Preceded by Charles I, Anthony I, Gabriele and Rainier II	Lord of Monaco; 1395	Succeeded by Louis I
Preceded by Republic of Genova (1402–1419)	Lord of Monaco; Until 1427 jointly with Ambroise and Anthony II: 1419–1454	Succeeded by Catalan
