= Otto Canella =

Consul of Genoa (died 1143)

Consul of Genoa
- In office 1133–1133

Personal details
- Born: c. 1070 Genoa, Republic of Genoa
- Died: c. 1143
- Children: 1. Bellamuto; 2. Grimaldo
- Occupation: Politician

Otto Canella (born in the middle of the 11th century, died in 1143) was Consul of the Republic of Genoa in 1133, and an ancestor of the House of Grimaldi, the family that currently rules Monaco. According to the 19th-century historian Gustave Saige, Canella's eldest son, Bellamuto, was also a Consul of Genoa, even nine years before Canella himself achieved the position. The Princely Family of Monaco take their name, Grimaldi, from his youngest son Grimaldo. Grimaldo became a Consul of Genoa in 1162.

Anne Edwards wrote: "They were an ambitious tribe, greedy for power within Genoa, always with an eye toward their own enrichment. The family, who were Ghibellines in the long struggle between the popes (Guelfs) and the emperors (Ghibellines), were pitted against the Doria and Spinola families on the Guelf side."
