= Grimaldo Canella =

Progenitor and eponym of the House of Grimaldi

Consul of Genoa
- In office 1162–1162
- In office 1170–1170
- In office 1184–1184

Personal details
- Born: c. 1110 Genoa, Republic of Genoa
- Died: c. 1184 (aged around 74)
- Children: Oberto Grimaldi; Pietro Grimaldi; Raimondo Grimaldi; Adelasia Grimaldi; Grimaldina Grimaldi; Anna Grimaldi
- Parent: Otto Canella (father)

Grimaldo Canella (c. 1110 – c. 1184) was the youngest son of Otto Canella and Consul of Genoa in 1162, 1170, and 1184. Grimaldo is considered the progenitor and eponym of the House of Grimaldi.

== Origins ==
Canella was probably born in Genoa around 1110, son of Genoese patrician Otto Canella, then Consul of Genoa, who would originate from the Lords of Vezzano Ligure, and his wife, Adelasia, probably a local noblewoman. Grimaldo was the youngest of the brothers: Rubaldo, Bellamunto, Otto, Bulzaneto and Anna Canella.

== Career ==
Politician and man-at-arms, Grimaldo appears for the first time in a document dated October 2, 1158.

Grimaldo Canella was several times Consul of Genoa, and served as ambassador to Federico Barbarossa in 1158 and to the Emir of Morocco in 1169.

He is attested in various notarial deeds between 1162 and 1184. As a man of arms, in October 1170 he led eight Genoese galleys who, under his command, pursued a small army of Pisan galleys and conquered one.

== Family ==
He married a local noblewoman, and had several children, including Oberto, who was known as "Oberto, son of Grimaldo." In patronymic terms, this was "Oberto Grimaldi," making this son of Grimaldo the first of the family known to bear the surname of Grimaldi.

During Grimaldo's lifetime his family already lived in the Genoese area between what would be the Church of San Luca, erected by his son Oberto and his father-in-law around 1180, and the sestiere called della Maddalena. In this age the Grimaldi began their ascent among the largest families of the Republic of Genoa, involved in the first struggles of the time.

In this context, the figure of Grimaldo therefore stands as that of the eponymous progenitor, the famous consul whose descendants wanted to keep his name as the surname of the same family. As progenitor Grimaldo is placed between the dark history and the beginning of the fame of the family. In fact, historians and heraldists have fabled about him ancestries and mythical origins.

Instead, his figure began to have serious studies only in the modern age even if the unknown on the real origin of the Canella still remains. After nine centuries the name and memory of Grimaldo are still preserved and he is looked upon as the founder of the Grimaldi family.

A century later, in 1270, the families of Grimaldi and Fieschi were forced into exile from Genoa. The Grimaldis ended up in the towns around Nice. They made their first attempt to seize the fortress of Monaco in 1297, although they did not control it permanently until 1419. Thus the family became Princes of Monaco.
