= Rainier II of Monaco =

Lord of Monaco from 1352 to 1357

Rainier II, Lord of Monaco (1350–1407), was the monarch of Monaco from June 29, 1352 to August 15, 1357. He was the son of Charles I, Lord of Monaco, and Lucchina Spinola. He ruled jointly with his father, his father's uncle Antonio, Lord of Monaco and his brother Gabriele, Lord of Monaco. He yielded Monaco to the besieging Genoese for 20,000 fl. but retained Menton and Roquebrune.

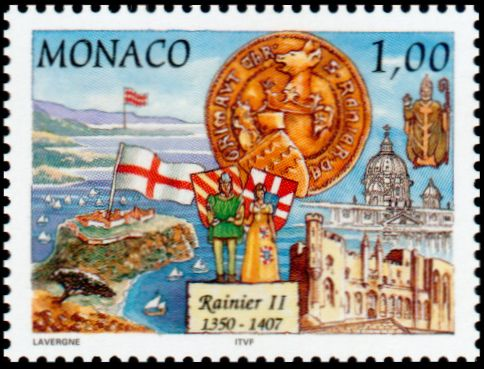
A stamp that features Ranier II and his consort Isabella

He was Admiral of Languedoc and Seneschal of Piedmont. He fought with the French army in the Battle of Poitiers. France's terrible losses in that epic battle led to sweeping military reforms by King Charles V of France. Monaco's port benefited directly from these. While escorting convoys of French merchant ships in the English Channel, he was captured by Edward the Black Prince. Edward sold his noble prisoner to his father, Edward III of England.

== Marriage and issue ==
First childless marriage to Maria del Carretto, daughter of Giorgio Marchese di Finale e Noli (Marquis/Margrave of Final and Noli) and Leonora Fieschi. They had no children.

He married secondly to Isabella Asinari. They had nine children:

1. Ambroise, Lord of Monaco
2. Anthony II, Lord of Monaco (alternately Antoine)
3. Giacomo of Monaco
4. Giovanna of Monaco
5. Giovanni I (Jean I, Lord of Monaco)
6. Gaspare of Monaco
7. Maria of Monaco
8. Griffeta of Monaco
9. Enrico of Monaco

== Succession ==
He was succeeded by his three sons Ambroise, Antoine, and Jean who ruled Monaco jointly.

== Notes ==
Rainier II of Monaco House of Grimaldi Born: 13? Died: 1407
Preceded by Charles I	Lord of Monaco; Jointly with Charles I, Antonio and Gabriele: 1352–1357	Succeeded by Louis I and Jean I
