= Rainier I of Monaco, Lord of Cagnes =

Monégasque ruler (c. 1267–1314)

Admiral of France Rainier I
- Lord of Cagnes
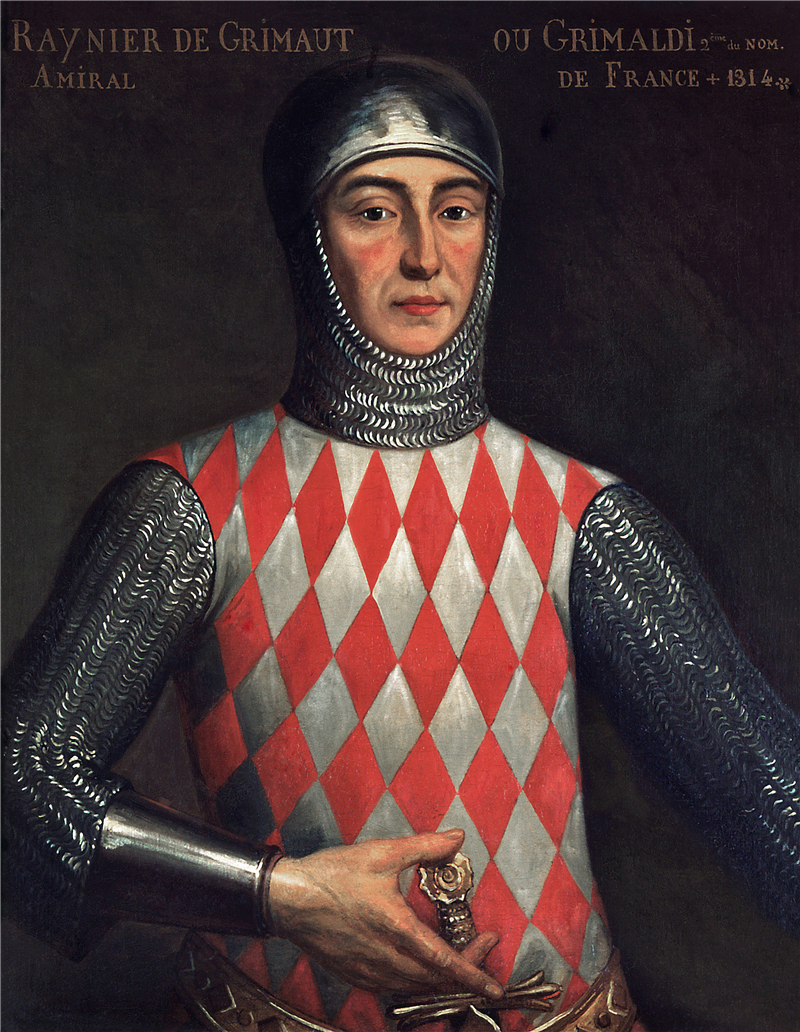
- Rainier I of Monaco.
- Born: c. 1267; Genoa, Republic of Genoa
- Died: 1314 (aged 46–47); Naples, Kingdom of Naples
- Noble family: Grimaldi
- Spouses: Salvatica del Carretto; Andriola Grillo
- Issue: Charles I, Lord of Monaco; Vinciguerra of Monaco; Salvaggia of Monaco; Luca, Lord of Villefranche
- Father: Lanfranco Grimaldi
- Mother: Aurelia del Carretto

Rainier I of Monaco (1267–1314) was the first sovereign Grimaldi ruler of the area now known as Monaco. He also held the title of Lord of Cagnes. Cagnes was the town where in 1309 he established a stronghold, today known as the Château Grimaldi.

Additionally, he was Baron of San Demetrio (Kingdom of Naples).

He was the eldest of the three sons of Lanfranco Grimaldi, French Vicar of Provence, by his wife, Aurelia del Carretto (who later remarried her husband's cousin, François Grimaldi).

In 1297, Rainier joined his stepfather (François) and a group of men to take the castle on the Rock of Monaco. The event is commemorated on the Monegasque coat of arms, where the supporters are two monks armed with swords (because François dressed as monk and opened the gates of Monaco's castle). Rainier held the citadel of Monaco for four years before departing on April 10, 1301. In 1304, he was appointed Admiral of France after winning the Battle of Zierikzee.

He married twice. Firstly, Salvatica del Carretto, daughter of Giacomo del Carretto, Margrave of Finale. They had four children:

- Charles I, his successor.
- Vinciguerra, who married Costanza Ruffa.
- Salvaggia, who married Gabriele Vento.
- Luca, Lord of Villefranche; married firstly Tedise, daughter of Daniel Cybo, and secondly Caterina Caracciolo.

Secondly, Rainier I married Andriola Grillo. This marriage was childless.
