= Rock of Monaco =

Rock and old town district in Monaco

Coordinates: 43.731°N 7.424°E

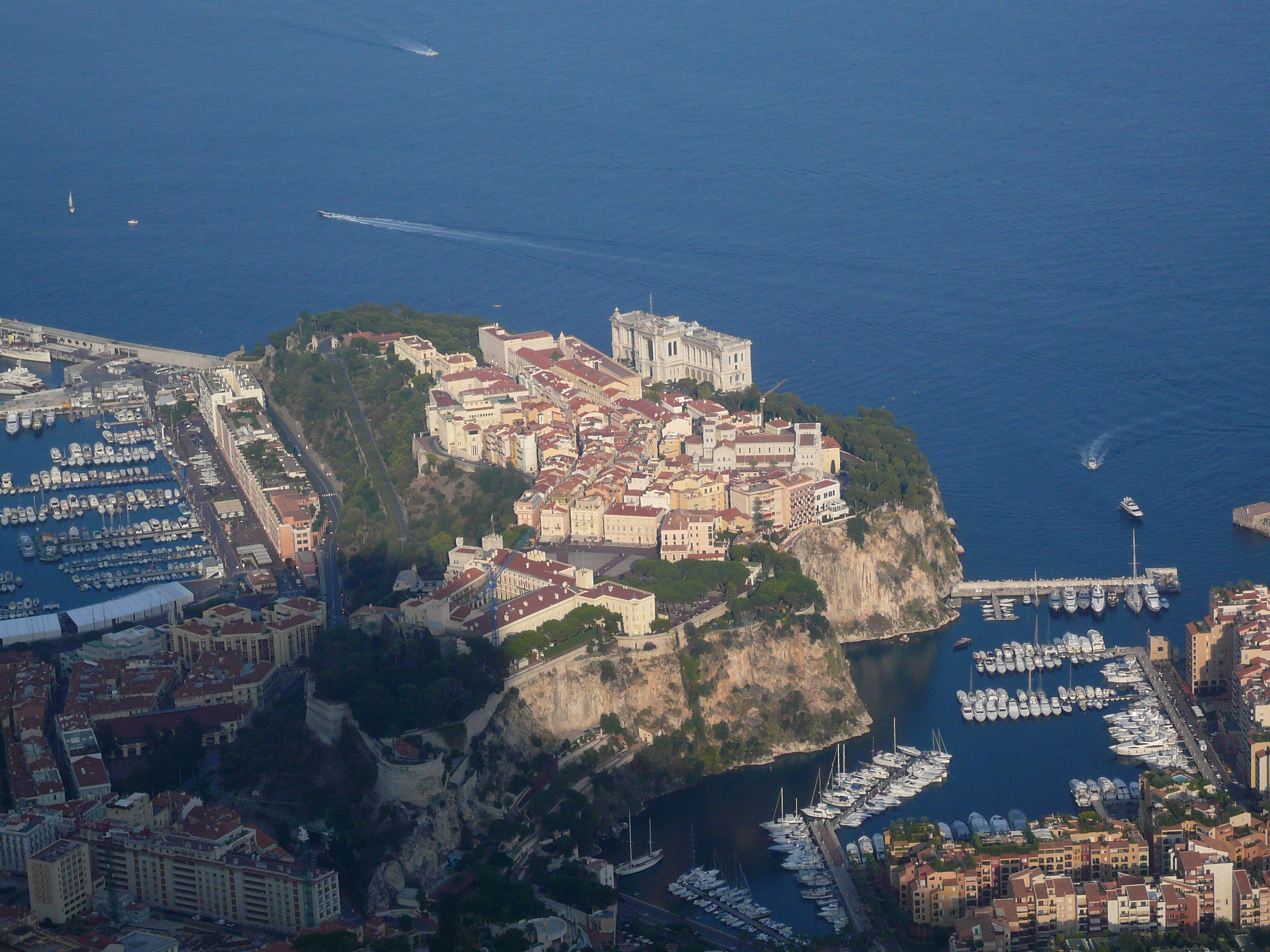
View of the Rock from Tête de Chien

The Rock of Monaco (French: Rocher de Monaco; Monégasque: Roca de Mu̍negu) is a 62-metre (203 ft) tall monolith on the Mediterranean coast of the Principality of Monaco. It overlooks the Mediterranean Sea and the Port Hercules.

== History ==
The Rock has been a coveted possession from the beginning of the ancient Massilian colony of Monoïkos (Greek: Μόνοικος), named for the Ligurian tribes who occupied the area and vied for control of it; even earlier, it was a shelter for primitive populations. The Rock of Monaco was also the first conquest of the Grimaldi dynasty, the rulers of the country for more than 700 years, founded when the Guelph Francesco Grimaldi disguised himself as a Franciscan friar in order to gain entry to the city and open the gates for his soldiers.

== Today ==
Today, the Rock is in the oldest of Monaco's four quarters, Monaco-Ville, which is also the location of Old Town, the oldest part of the city, not far from the Prince's Palace (French: Le Palais Princier), home of the current monarch Albert II and the princely family, the Cathedral and the Oceanographic Museum of Monaco. The Rock of Monaco is a popular attraction where tourists view the palace and the changing of the guards.

== Image gallery ==
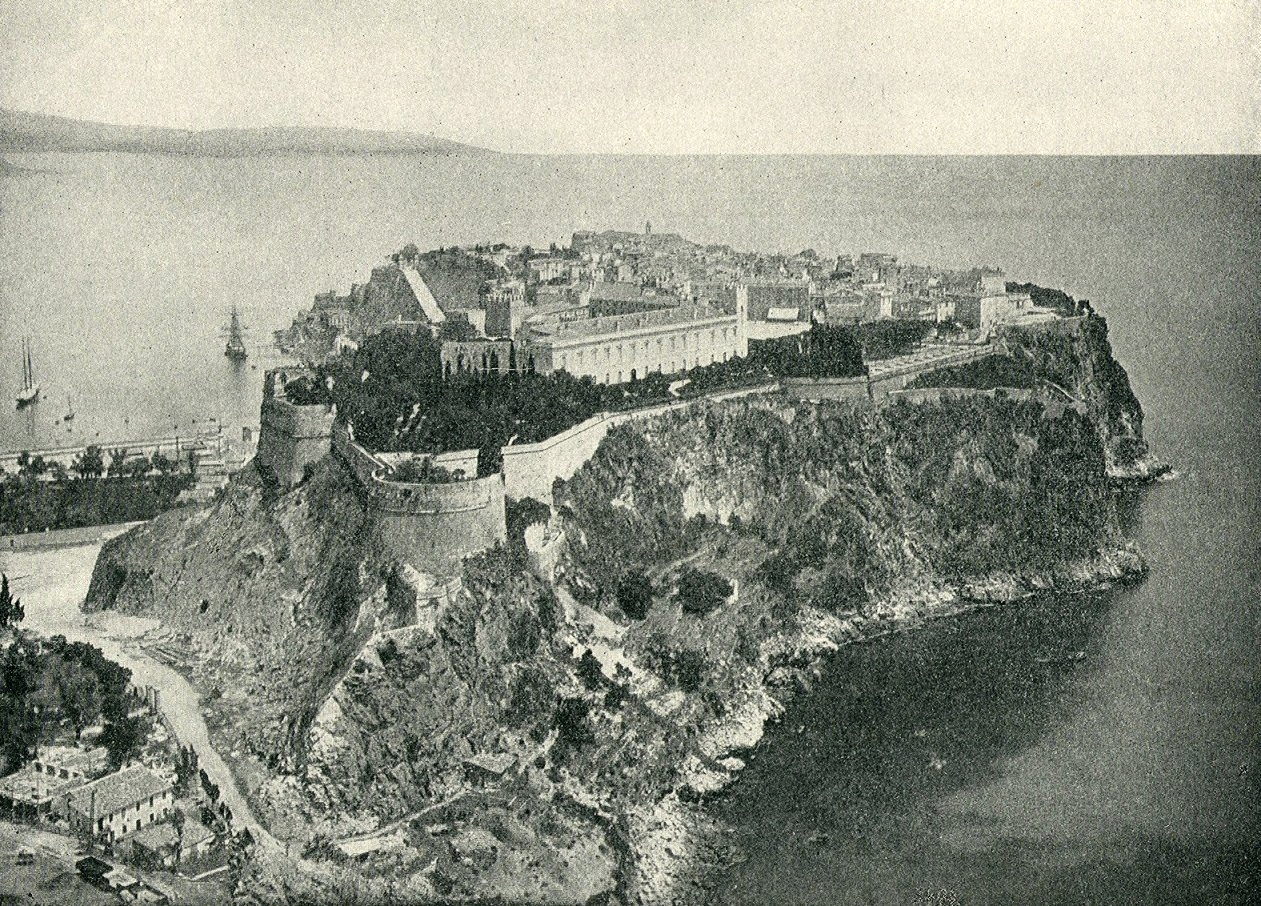
The Rock in 1890

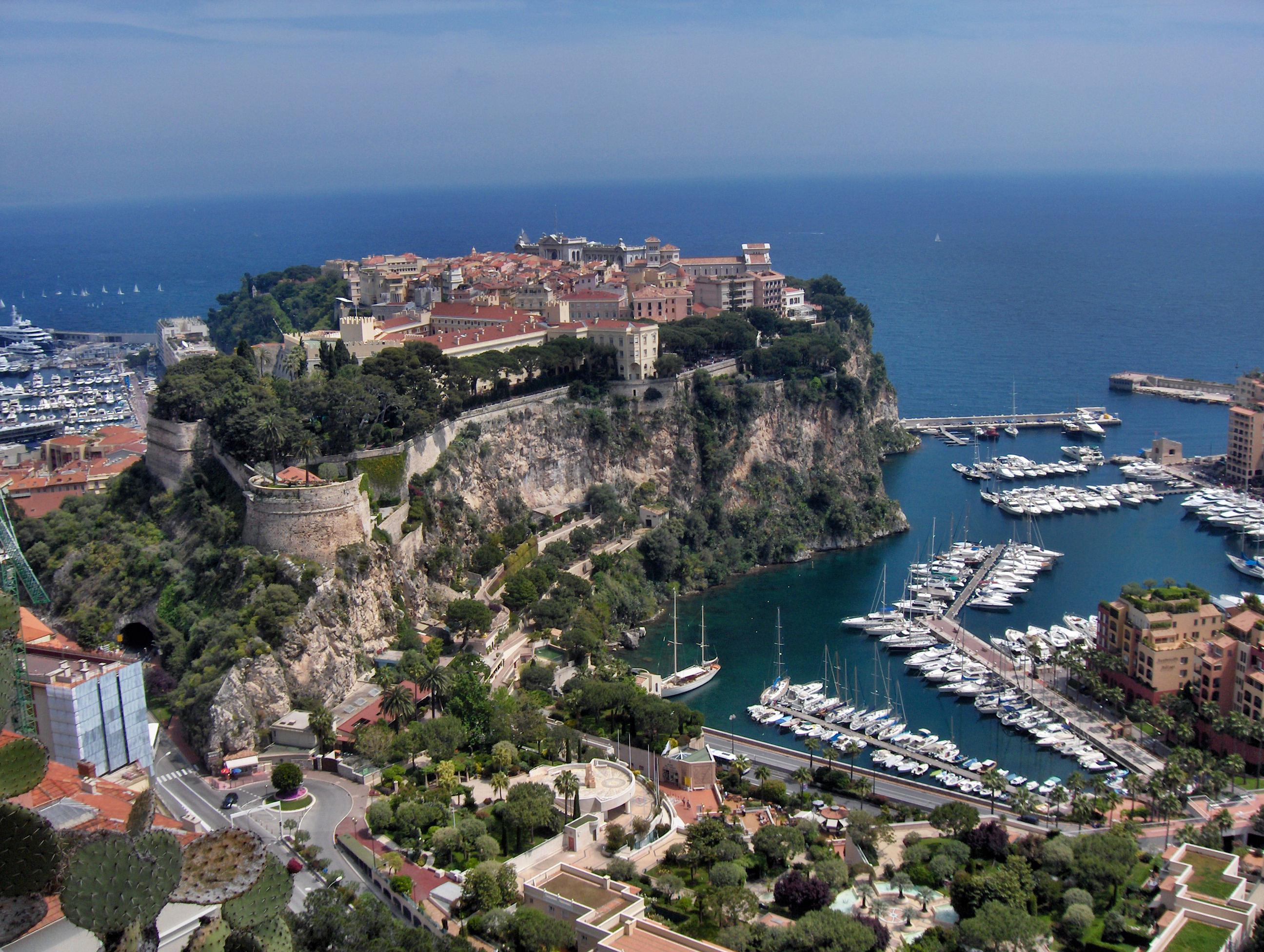
Monaco-Ville and harbour of Fontvieille today
