= House of Grimaldi =

Ruling dynasty of Monaco since 1297

- Parent house: Goyon (1731–1949); Polignac (1949–present)
- Country: Genoa, Monaco, France
- Origin: Genoa, Italy
- Founded: 1160; 866 years ago
- Founder: Grimaldo Canella
- Current head: Albert II, Prince of Monaco
- Titles: Prince of Monaco; Doge of Genoa (nonhereditary); Duke of Valentinois; Duke of Grimaldi; Marquis of Baux; Lord of Monaco
- Style: His/Her Serene Highness
- Estate: Prince's Palace of Monaco
- Dissolution: 29 December 1731 (in agnatic line after death of Louise Hippolyte)
- Cadet branches: Grimaldi de Puget

The House of Grimaldi is the reigning house of the Principality of Monaco. The house was founded in 1160 by Grimaldo Canella in Genoa and became the ruling house of Monaco after Francesco Grimaldi captured the Rock of Monaco in 1297.

Every Prince of Monaco has been a member of the House of Grimaldi. Since the 18th century, the princes have been agnatic descendants of other families that have inherited through the female line and adopted the Grimaldi name. In 1715, Jacques Goyon de Matignon married Louise Hippolyte, Princess of Monaco, the last Grimaldi agnatic heir. He and his male-line descendants adopted the Grimaldi name and ruled as princes of Monaco from 1731 to 1949. During much of the Ancien Régime, the family resided at the French royal court, where they used the title of Duke of Valentinois from 1642 to 1715.

The current head of the house is Albert II of Monaco, Sovereign Prince of Monaco. He is the only son of Prince Rainier III and his princess consort, who was formerly known as Grace Kelly.

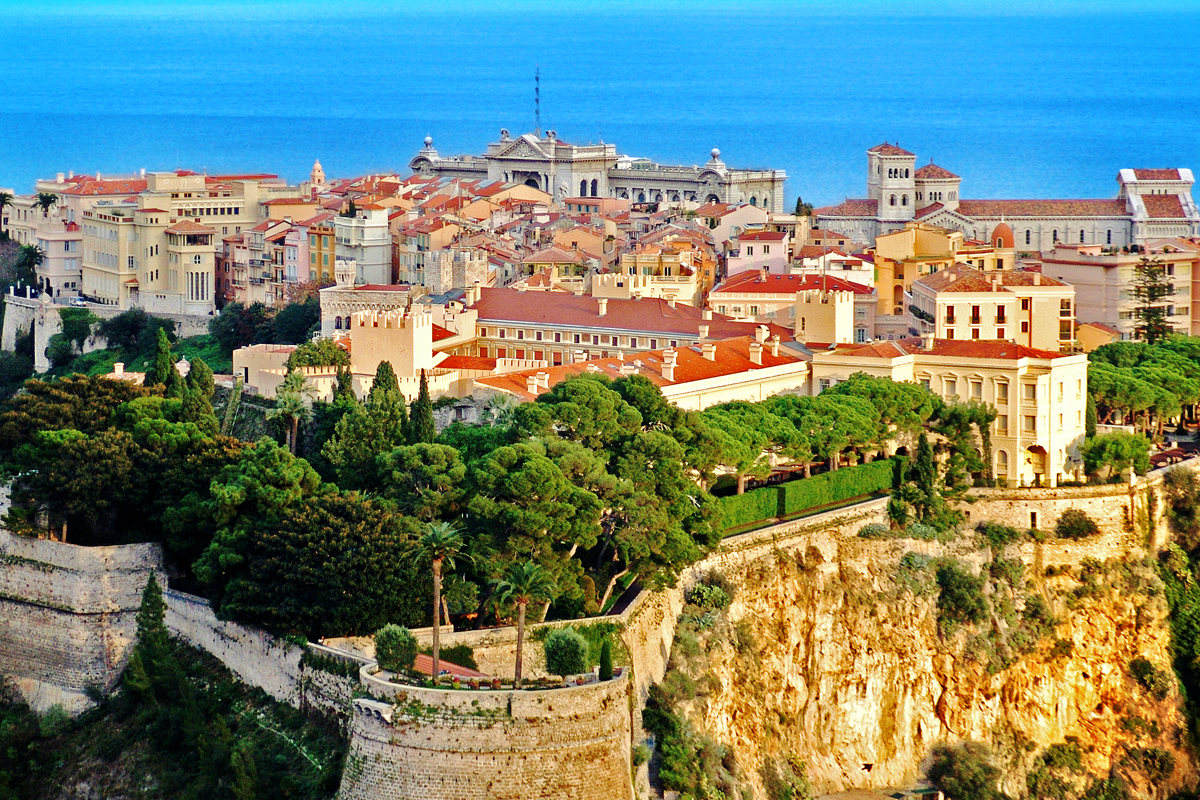
Prince's Palace of Monaco

== Beginnings in Genoa ==
The Grimaldi family, originally from France, moved to Genoa in 1070 with Inigo Grimaldo. In the capital, several families united under the name of Grimaldi and became one of the most powerful families in Genoa, later leading the Guelph political faction, which supported the Pope's interests and opposed the Ghibellines, who supported the Holy Roman Empire.

The Grimaldis descend from Grimaldo, a Genoese consul who lived during the time of the early Crusades. He may have been a son of Otto Canella, an earlier consul of the Republic of Genoa. His numerous descendants led maritime expeditions throughout the Mediterranean, the Black Sea, and the North Sea. They quickly became one of the most powerful families of Genoa.

The Grimaldis feared that the head of a rival Genoese family could break the fragile balance of power in a coup and become lord of Genoa, as had happened in other Italian cities. They entered into a Guelphic alliance with the Fieschi family. In 1271, the Guelphs were banned from Genoa, and the Grimaldi took refuge in their castles in Liguria and Provence. They signed a treaty with Charles of Anjou, King of Sicily and Count of Provence to retake control of Genoa. In 1276, they accepted a peace under the auspices of the Pope, but the civil war continued. Not all the Grimaldis chose to return to Genoa and instead settled in their fiefdoms, where they could raise armies.

In 1299, the Grimaldis and their allies launched a few galleys to attack the port of Genoa before taking refuge on the Western Riviera. During the following years, the Grimaldis entered into different alliances that would allow them to return to power in Genoa. This time, it was the turn of their rivals, the Spinola family, to be exiled from the city. During this period, both the Guelphs and Ghibellines took and abandoned the castle of Monaco, which was ideally located to launch political and military operations against Genoa. Therefore, the tale of Francis Grimaldi and his faction – who took the castle of Monaco disguised as friars in 1297 – is largely anecdotal.

In the early 14th century, the Aragonese raided the shores of Provence and Liguria, challenging Genoa and King Robert of Provence. In 1353, the combined fleet of eighty Venetian and Aragonese galleys gathered in Sardinia to meet the fleet of sixty galleys under the command of Anthony Grimaldi. Only nineteen Genoese vessels survived the battle. Fearing an invasion, Genoa requested the protection of the Lord of Milan.

Several of the oldest feudal branches of the House of Grimaldi appeared during these conflicts, such as the branches of Antibes, Beuil, Nice, Puget, and Sicily. In 1395, the Grimaldis took advantage of the discords in Genoa to take possession of Monaco, which they then ruled as a condominium. This is the origin of today's principality.

As was customary in Genoa, the Grimaldis organised their family ties within a corporation called albergo. In the political reform of 1528, the Grimaldi became one of the 28 alberghi of the Republic of Genoa, which included the Doria and Pallavicini families, and to which other families were formally invited to join. The House of Grimaldi provided several doges, cardinals, cabinet ministers, and military officers of historical note.

== Territories in Italy ==
From 1532 to 1641, the town of Campagna in southern Italy was ruled by the Grimaldi family, princes of Monaco, after Emperor Charles V granted them the Marquisate of Campagna as their Italian capital; during this “Golden Century,” the city flourished with noble palaces, monasteries, fountains, bridges, an active diocese, a humanistic and scientific university, one of Italy’s earliest printing presses, and hydromechanical industries, while the dominion also included Canosa di Puglia, Terlizzi, Monteverde, Ripacandida, Ginestra, and Garagnone. Although Grimaldi rule ended in 1641, its legacy remains visible in Campagna’s architecture and urban fabric; ties with Monaco were renewed in 1991 by Prince Rainier III and later strengthened by visits of Prince Albert II in 1997 and 2018 within the Historic Sites of the Grimaldis of Monaco program.

== French influences ==
Provence became a part of the Kingdom of France from 1486, and occasionally the Grimaldi relied upon French support to preserve their independence from the Republic of Genoa and the Duchy of Savoy. In the process they married into the French nobility in the 1600s, inherited French estates, and often lived in Paris, latterly at the Hôtel Matignon, until the French Revolution of 1789. Monaco and the neighbouring County of Nice were taken by the revolutionary army in 1792, and were French-controlled until 1815. Nice passed back to the Kingdom of Sardinia in 1815; then it was ceded to France by the Treaty of Turin in 1860. Monaco was re-established by the Congress of Vienna in 1815, with a brief Italian occupation in 1940–43.

== Modern succession ==
By convention, membership of sovereign European houses is through the male line. By that definition, from 1731, the French noble House of Goyon-Matignon ruled as Princes of Monaco until 1949. However, one of the terms of James de Goyon de Matignon becoming Prince of Monaco jure uxoris was that he adopt the name and arms of Grimaldi so that the house would be preserved on the throne, and the right of succession was through his wife Louise-Hippolyte Grimaldi, who abdicated in her husband's favor. Similarly, when Charlotte Louvet was legitimised in 1911 and made successor to Monaco, her husband, Count Pierre de Polignac, adopted, as a condition of the marriage, the name and arms of Grimaldi, but from this moment all his direct descendants Grimaldi would also have the title of Counts of Polignac. In this way the "Grimaldi" name and arms were continued.

Under the succession rules prior to 1911, Monaco's throne would have passed to Prince Wilhelm of Urach. However, French president at the time Raymond Poincaré had threatened that if the throne was inherited by a German, France would annex the principality.

In 2018 a Grimaldi cousin, Count Louis de Causans, who hailed from a cadet branch of the family, sued France for €351m compensation, claiming that it had deceived his family during the succession crisis of 1911, and that his great-grandfather, Count Aynard de Chabrillan, should have inherited Monaco's throne.

Until 2002, a treaty between Monaco and France stated that if the reigning Prince ever failed to leave dynastic offspring, then sovereignty over the Grimaldi realm would revert to France. The 2002 agreement modified this to expand the pool of potential heirs to dynastic collaterals of the reigning Prince (excluding adoptive heirs, hitherto allowed, e.g. Princess Charlotte and her descendants), guaranteeing Monegasque independence. Article I of Monaco's house law requires that the reigning Prince or Princess bear the surname of Grimaldi.

The coat of arms of the House of Grimaldi is simply described as fusily argent and gules, i.e., a red and white diamond pattern, with no further modifiers.

== Main living members ==
- Albert II of Monaco, Sovereign Prince of Monaco, son and successor of Rainier III and Grace Kelly.
- Charlène de Monaco, Princess Consort of Monaco.
  - Jacques, Hereditary Prince of Monaco, Marquis of Baux, Count of Polignac, son of Albert II and Charlène.
  - Princess Gabriella, Countess of Carladès, Mademoiselle of Polignac, daughter of Albert II and Charlène.
- Caroline, Princess of Hanover, Mademoiselle of Polignac, older sister of Albert II and Stéphanie.
  - Andrea Casiraghi, Charlotte Casiraghi, and Pierre Casiraghi, children of Caroline and her late husband, Stefano Casiraghi.
  - Princess Alexandra of Hanover, daughter of Caroline and her present husband, Ernst August, Prince of Hanover.
- Princess Stéphanie of Monaco, Mademoiselle of Polignac, younger sister of Albert II and Caroline.
  - Louis Robert Paul Ducruet, Pauline Grace Maguy Ducruet, and Camille Marie Kelly Gottlieb, children of Stéphanie.
- Christian Louis de Massy, cousin of Albert II. Married four times and with offspring.

== Family tree ==
Otto Canella
Grimaldo Canella
Oberto Grimaldi
Grimaldo	Ingo
Lanfranco	Luca
Rainier I Lord of Monaco	Gabriele
Charles I Lord of Monaco	Gaspare
Rainier II; Lord of Monaco	Antonio
Jean I Lord of Monaco	Luca; Lord of Antibes
Catalan; Lord of Monaco	Niccolo; Lord of Antibes
Claudine; Lady of Monaco	Lamberto; Lord of Monaco
Jean II; Lord of Monaco	Lucien; Lord of Monaco	Augustine; Ruler of Monaco
Honore I Lord of Monaco
Charles II; Lord of Monaco	Ercole; Lord of Monaco
Honoré II; Prince of Monaco
Ercole; Marquis of Baux
Louis I Prince of Monaco
Antoine I Prince of Monaco
Louise; Princess of Monaco	Jacques I Prince of Monaco
Honoré III; Prince of Monaco
Honoré IV; Prince of Monaco
Honoré V Prince of Monaco	Florestan I Prince of Monaco
Charles III; Prince of Monaco
Albert I Prince of Monaco
Louis II; Prince of Monaco
Princess Charlotte; Duchess of Valentinois
Rainier III; Prince of Monaco
Albert II; Prince of Monaco

== Select list of Grimaldis ==
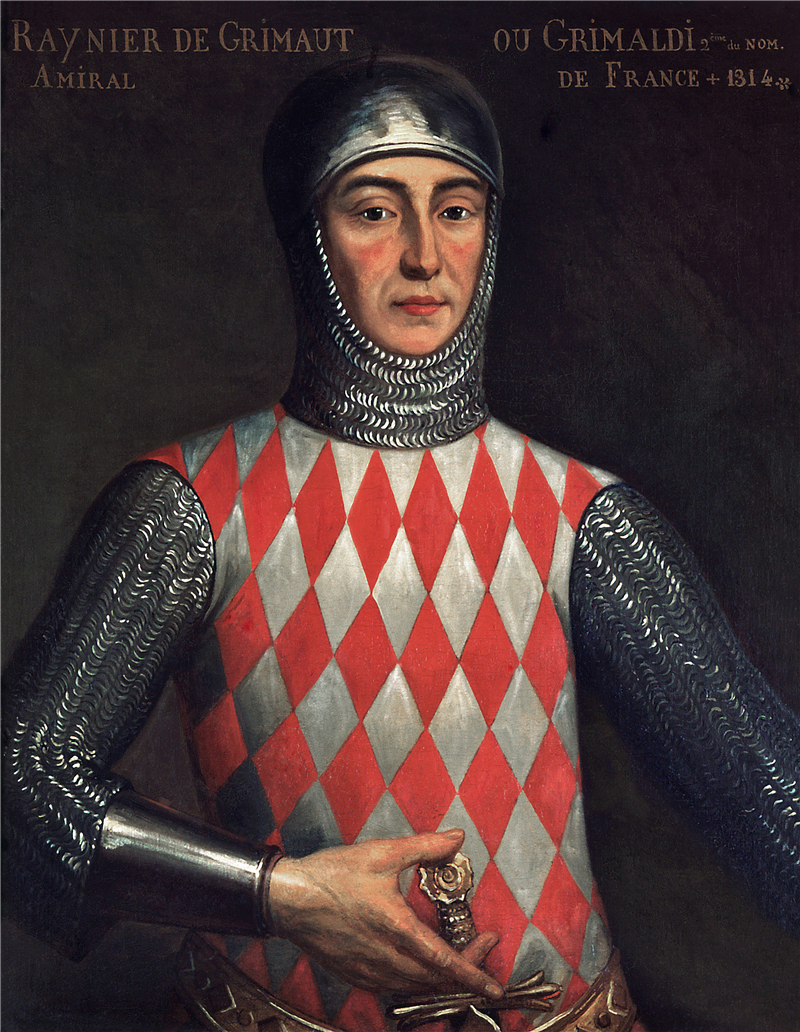
Rainier I. Grimaldi (1267-1314)

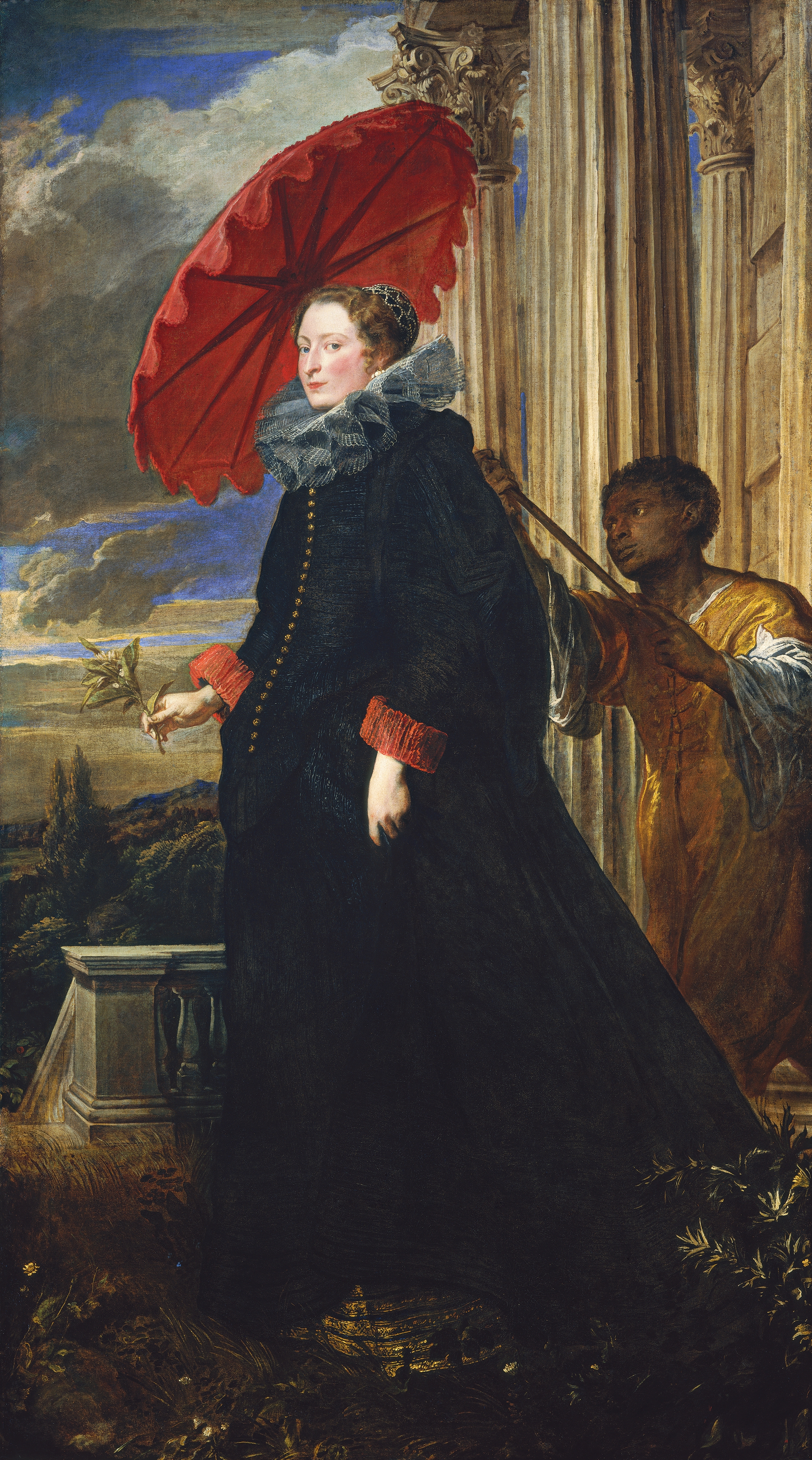
Elena Grimaldi, as painted by Anthony van Dyck, c. 1623

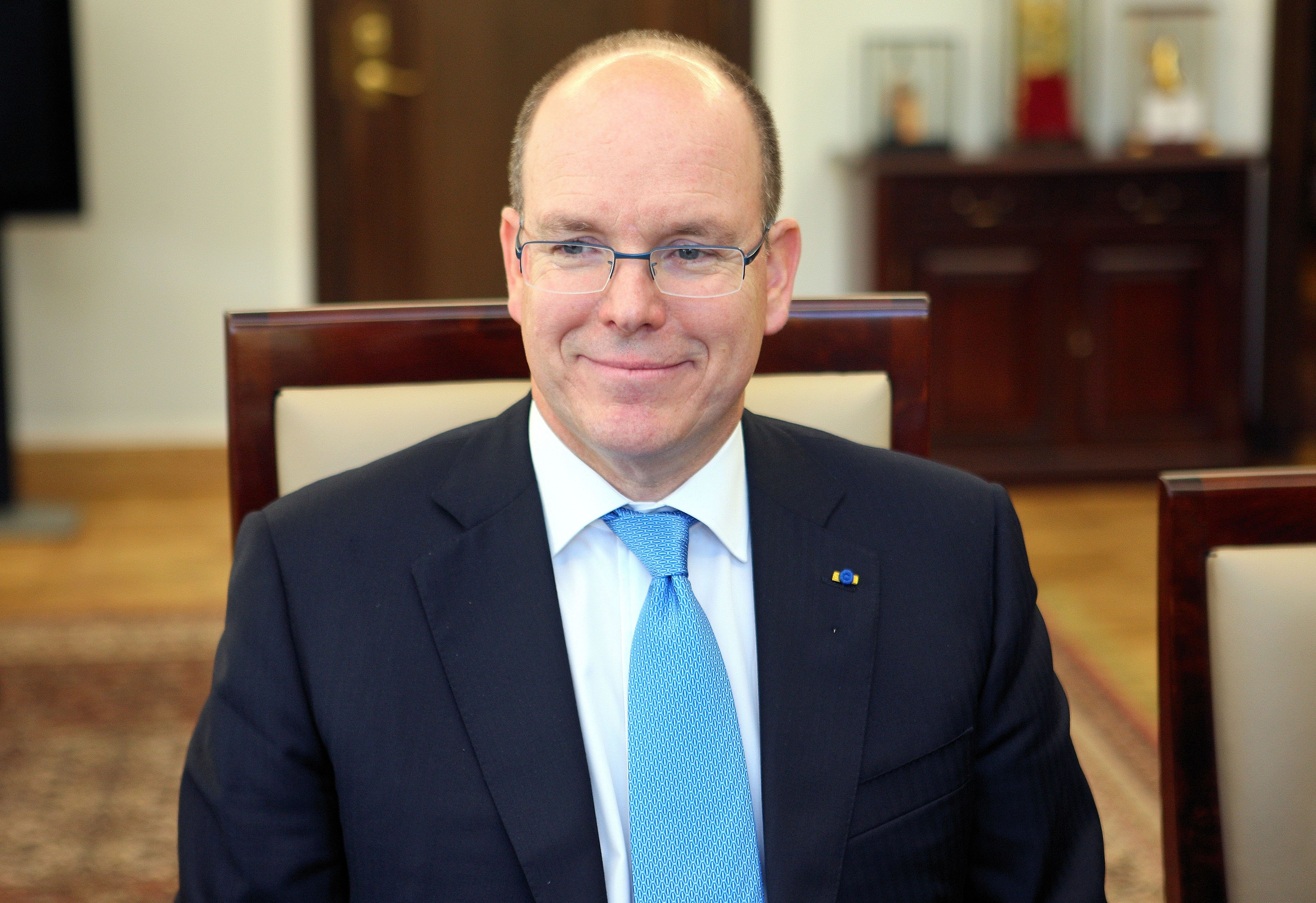
Albert II, Prince of Monaco

- Grimaldo Canella, consul of the Republic of Genoa, founder of this House
- Hubert Grimaldi, first to bear the Grimaldi patronymic name
- Luca Grimaldi, troubadour and podestà of Milan and Ventimiglia
- Rainier I, lord of Cagnes, admiral of France
- Charles I, lord of Monaco, Cagnes, and Menton
- Anthony, lord of Monaco, admiral of Genoa
- Luc and Marc Grimaldi of Antibes, lords of Menton, Cagnes, and Antibes
- Lamberto Grimaldi and Claudia of Monaco
- Augustin, archbishop
- Nicolas, prince of Salerno
- Louis I, prince of Monaco, ambassador of Louis IV
- Girolamo (died 1543). Created a Cardinal in 1527. He married Francisca Cattaneo of Genoese and had five children. After her death he entered holy orders. He was a Senator of Genoa.
- Domenico, Archbishop of Avignon and uncle of Girolamo Grimaldi-Cavalleroni (see below)
- Girolamo (1597–1683). Cardinal and Archbishop of Aix
- Elena Grimaldi, painted by Anthony van Dyck
- Girolamo (1674–1733). Created a Cardinal 1731
- Alexander, doge of Genoa
- John Baptist, doge of Genoa
- Peter Francis, doge of Genoa
- Honoré II, Prince of Monaco (1597–1662)
- Jacques François Leonor Grimaldi. Prince of Monaco and father of Honoré III, Prince of Monaco
- Nicola (1645–1717). Created cardinal deacon in the consistory of 17 May 1706
- Jerónimo Grimaldi, 1st Duke of Grimaldi (1710-1789)
- Louise-Hippolyte, Princess of Monaco - mother of Honoré III, Prince of Monaco
- Honoré III, Prince of Monaco (1720–1795)
- Honoré IV, Prince of Monaco (1758–1819)
- Honoré V, Prince of Monaco (1778–1841)
- Florestan I, Prince of Monaco (1785–1856)
- Charles III, Prince of Monaco (1818–1889)
- Albert I, Prince of Monaco (1848–1922)
- Louis II, Prince of Monaco (1870–1949)
- Princess Charlotte, Duchess of Valentinois (1898–1977)
- Prince Pierre, Count of Polignac (1895–1964)
- Rainier III, Prince of Monaco (1923–2005)
- Princess Antoinette, Baroness of Massy (1920–2011)
- Caroline Louise Marguerite Grimaldi (born 1957)
- Albert II, Prince of Monaco (born 1958)
- Stéphanie Marie Elisabeth Grimaldi (born 1965)
- Jacques, Hereditary Prince of Monaco (born 2014)
- Princess Gabriella, Countess of Carladès (born 2014)

== See also ==
- House of Goyon de Matignon (fr)
- House of Polignac (fr)
- Monarchy of Monaco
- Prince's Palace of Monaco
- Succession to the Monegasque throne
- Tour Grimaldi
