= Celles =

Celles is the name of several places:

== Wallonia, Belgium ==
- Celles, Hainaut, a municipality located in the province of Hainaut
- Celles, Houyet, a village in the municipality of Houyet, province of Namur. It marks the furthest point the German Army advanced during the Battle of the Bulge in World War II
- Celles, Faimes, a village in the municipality of Faimes, province of Liège

== France ==
- Celles, Ariège, a commune in the Ariège département
- Celles, Cantal, a commune in the Cantal département
- Celles, Charente-Maritime, a commune in the Charente-Maritime département
- Celles, Dordogne, a commune in the Dordogne département
- Celles, Hérault, a commune in the Hérault département
- Celles-en-Bassigny, a commune in the Haute-Marne département
- Celles-lès-Condé, a commune in the Aisne département
- Celles-sur-Aisne, a commune in the Aisne département
- Celles-sur-Belle, a commune in the Deux-Sèvres département
- Celles-sur-Durolle, a commune in the Puy-de-Dôme département
- Celles-sur-Ource, a commune in the Aube département
- Celles-sur-Plaine, a commune in the Vosges département

== Spain ==
- Celles (Noreña), a parish of Noreña, Asturias
