= Apance =

River in France

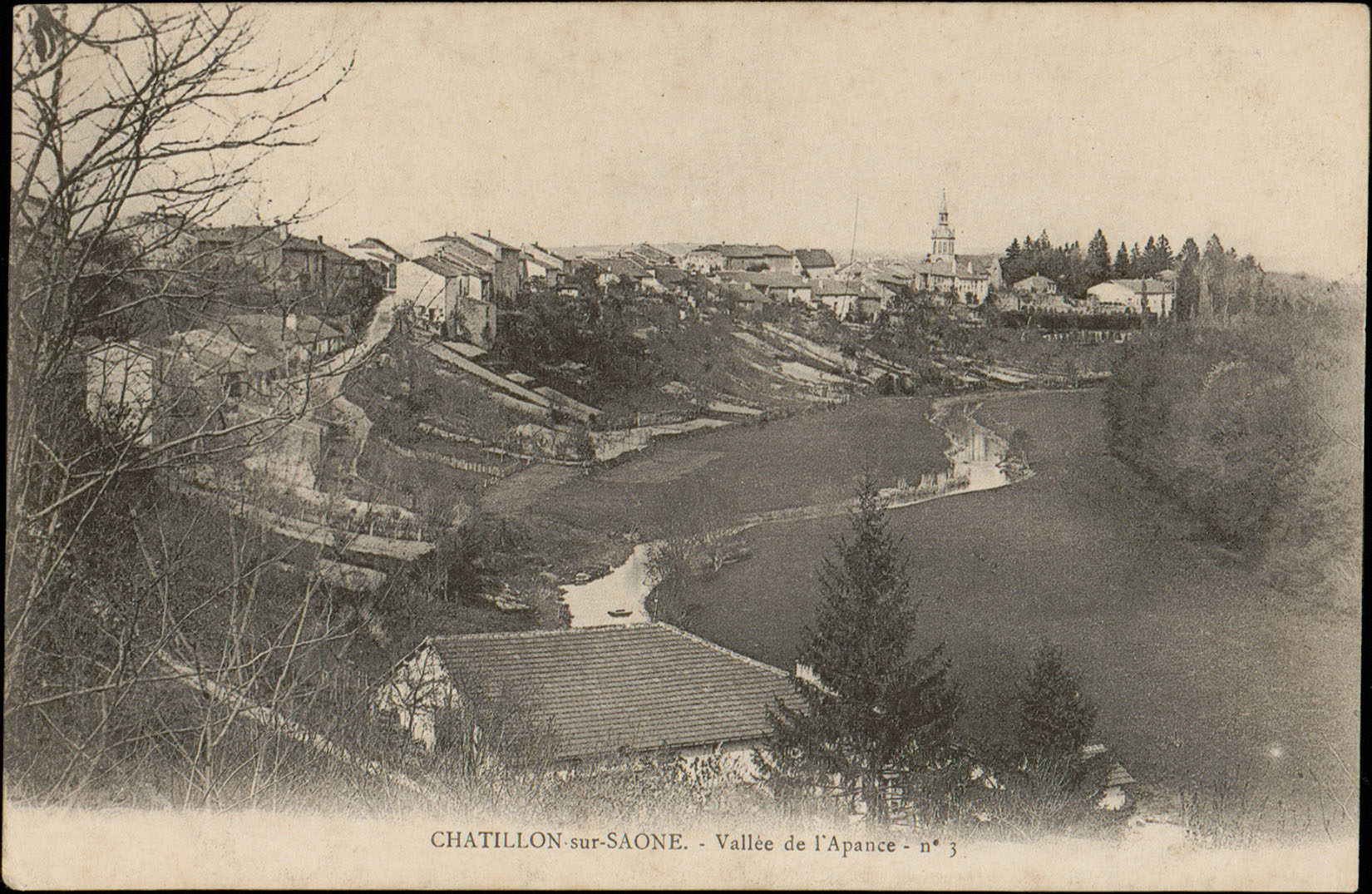

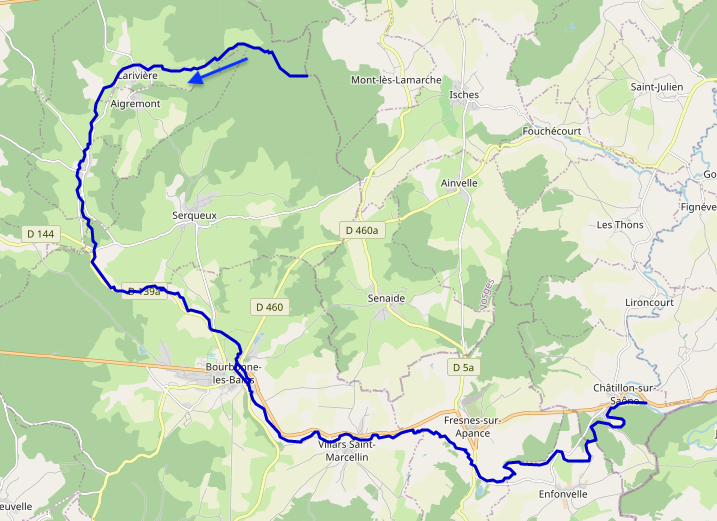

- Location within France Location within Grand Est

Location
- Country: France
- Region: Grand Est

Physical characteristics
- Mouth
  - location: Saône
  - coordinates: 47.947°N 5.8925°E
- Length: 34.4 km (21.4 mi)
- Basin size: 195 km^{2} (75 sq mi)

Basin features
- Progression: Saône→ Rhône→ Mediterranean Sea

The Apance (French pronunciation: [apɑ̃s]) is a river in the East of France. It is one of the main tributaries to the Upper Saône from the Grand Est region. It is 34.4 km (21.4 mi) long.

== Etymology ==
The name Apance is of unclear origin, but occurs as early as the 7th century, as "Spancia".

== Geography ==
The Apance is a right tributary of the Upper Saône (which refers to the part of the Saône upstream of its confluence with the Doubs. It rises in the northern border of Apance-Amance, a natural micro-region covering the south-western protrusions of the Saône plateaux where the Saône itself rises. Apance-Amance occupies the eastern part of the Langres arrondissement which forms the south of the Haute-Marne department, at the extreme south-east of the Champagne-Ardenne region. The name "Apance-Amance" refers to both the Apance river and another tributary of the upper Saône which rises in the region. The main part of the Apance's course occurs within the Bourbonne-les-Bains canton, which is the furthest east in Langres and the Champagne-Ardenne region.

The final part of the river and its confluence with the Upper Saône occur with the historic regions of Champagne, Lorraine and Franche-Comté. This is in the territory of the Châtillon-sur-Saône commune under the Vosges department, at the extreme south-west of Lorraine. The village from which the commune takes its name, is built on a spur between the two rivers whose eastern foot dominates their confluence. The confluences is on the south-west border of la Vôge, the highest area in the Saône plateaux. These plateaux form the high upper-basin of the Vôge river, whose source is approximately 27 kilometres (17 mi) north-east of its confluence with the Apnace. The Vôge river marks the north-eastern boundary of Apance-Amance, and covers part of the south-west quarter of the Vosges department and the far-North of the Haute-Saône department.

=== Tributaries ===
The main tributaries of the Apance are, from upstream to downstream:

- Fort-Ferré
- Roteux
- Beaucharmoy
- Jean Paillard
- Médet
- Clan
- Le Vaulis

=== Communes ===
The Apance flows through the following communes and localities, from upstream to downstream:

- Serqueux
- Larivière-Arnoncourt
- Aigremont
- Arnoncourt-sur-Apance
- Bourbonne-les-Bains
- Villars-Saint-Marcellin
- Fresnes-sur-Apance
- Enfonvelle
- Châtillon-sur-Saône

All these communes lie in the Bourbonne-les-bains Canton in the Haute-Marne department, except for Châtillon-sur-Saône, which lies in the Lamarche Canton in the Vosges department.

== Hydrology ==
The Apance rises in the south side of a line of crests oriented north-north-east/south-south west, closing the east of Bassigny where the Meuse rises. In the north-east, this line is the continuation of the "Monts Faucilles", the name of the line of crests closing the north of la Vôge and where the Saône rises. The waters of the northern side of these "mountains" are shared between the Meuse to the west and the Moselle to the east. To the south-west, the line of crests connects to that at the far north-east of the Langres plateau, the Langrois ouvert, where the Marne rises. The waters of the southern slope of this terrain which extends from the Langres plateau to the "Monts Faucilles" feed into the Upper Saône basin.

The Apance forms at the far north-east of the territory of the Serqueux commune within the territories of the communes of Larivière-Arnoncourt and Mont-lès-Lamarche, the latter being within the Vosges department in the Lorraine region. The springs which form the Apance run through the combe of Bas du Vau at the western border of a southern finger of the Morimond plateaux. The waters of the northern side of this plateau which seals the north-east of Bassigny feed into the upper Meuse basin. The aquifer at the origin of this plateau is at the seat of sandstone beds infraliasic of the Lower Rhaetian. The lower bed is made of iridescent marls from the Upper Keuper. The springs which flow out of this aquifer are at an elevation of about 460 metres (1,510 ft).

The dominant east-west direction of the middle to lower course of the Apance, notwithstanding a southerly-oriented diversion, results from the orientation of main faces of the sides. Downstream of Larivière-Arnoncourt, the river valley progressively widens until its outflow into the weak depression of Bourbonne-les-bains. From Villars-Saint-Marcellin to Fresnes-sur-Apance, the lower valley tightens again before its intersection with the valley of the Saône, opening to the south towards the Jussey depression. The Apance drops by about 230 metres (750 ft) from origin to its mouth, a gradient of just less than 0.7 percent.

== See also ==
- List of rivers of France
