= Châtelet =

Châtelet or Chatelet may refer to:

- Châtelet, a type of large gatehouse, a fortified entry point of a castle

== Places ==
=== Belgium ===
- Châtelet, Belgium, a municipality in the province of Hainaut

=== France ===
- Grand Châtelet, a former stronghold with courts, police, and prisons on the site of the Place du Châtelet
- Place du Châtelet, a public square in Paris, on the right bank of the Seine on the border of the 1st and 4th arrondissements
- Théâtre du Châtelet, a theatre in Paris, on the Place du Châtelet
- Châtelet station, a Paris Metro station, located near the Place du Châtelet
- Châtelet–Les Halles station, a major RER station in Paris, attached to both the Châtelet and Les Halles metro stations
- Le Châtelet-sur-Meuse, a commune in Haute-Marne that is near the source of the Meuse

=== Switzerland ===
- Le Châtelet (mountain), in Switzerland

== Other uses ==
- Châtelet surface, a surface in algebraic geometry

== People with the surname ==
- Albert Châtelet (1883–1960), French mathematician and politician
- Émilie du Châtelet (1706−1749), French mathematician, physicist, and author
- François Châtelet (1925−1985), French historian of political philosophy
- François Châtelet (mathematician) (1912–1987), French mathematician
- Gilles Châtelet (1944–1999), French philosopher and mathematician

== See also ==
- Châtelain (female chatelaine), the French title for the keeper of a castle
- Chastellet, a Templar castle lost to Saladin at the Siege of Jacob's Ford
