= Voisey =

Voisey may refer to:

- Robert Voisey (born 1969), composer and impresario
- William Voisey (1891–1964), football player and manager
- Neuvelle-lès-Voisey, commune in France
- Voisey, Haute-Marne, a commune in the Haute-Marne department, France
- Voisey's Bay, a bay in eastern Canada
