= Serqueux =

Serqueux may refer to the following places in France:

- Serqueux, Haute-Marne, a commune in the Haute-Marne department
- Serqueux, Seine-Maritime, a commune in the Seine-Maritime department
