= Vicq =

Vicq may refer to the following places in France:

- Vicq, Allier, a commune in the department of Allier
- Vicq, Haute-Marne, a commune in the department of Haute-Marne
- Vicq, Nord, a commune in the department of Nord
- Vicq, Yvelines, a commune in the department of Yvelines
- Vicq-d'Auribat, a commune in the department of Landes
- Vicq-Exemplet, a commune in the department of Indre
- Vicq-sur-Breuilh, a commune in the department of Haute-Vienne
- Vicq-sur-Gartempe, a commune in the department of Vienne
- Vicq-sur-Nahon, a commune in the department of Indre
- Pressignac-Vicq, a commune in the department of Dordogne

== People ==
- Henri de Vicq, Lord of Meuleveldt; Flemish Ambassador.
- Vicq, the pseudonym for Raymond Antoine, Belgian comics artist and writer
