= Frécourt =

- Commune
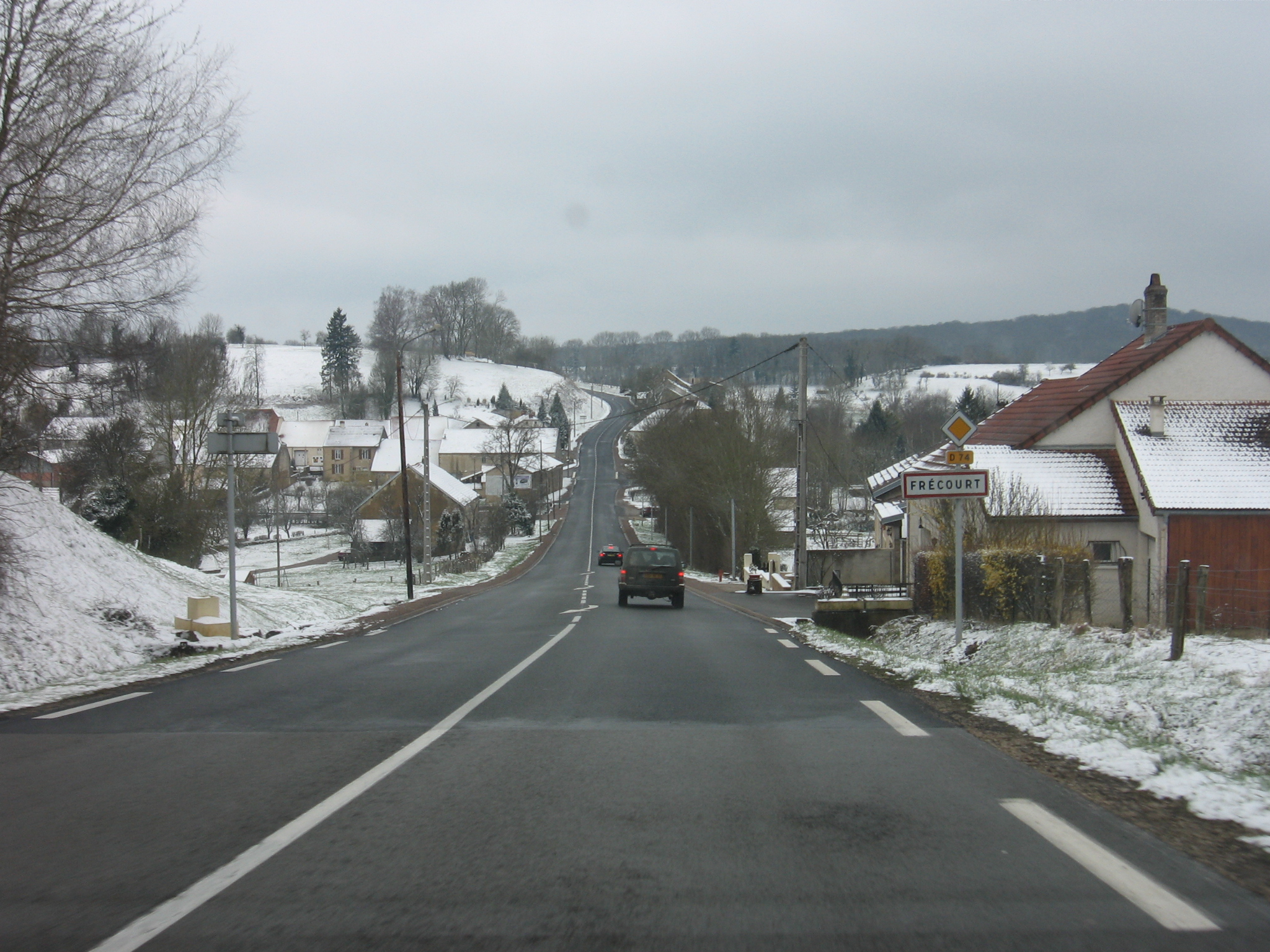
- Frécourt (Haute-Marne)
- Location of Frécourt
- Location within France Location within Grand Est
- Coordinates: 47°57′08″N 5°27′29″E
- Country: France
- Region: Grand Est
- Department: Haute-Marne
- Arrondissement: Langres
- Canton: Bourbonne-les-Bains
- Intercommunality: Grand Langres

Government
  - Mayor (2020–2026): Dominique Delaborde
- Area^{1}: 6.22 km^{2} (2.40 sq mi)
- Elevation: 350 m (1,150 ft)
- Highest elevation: 473 m (1,552 ft)
- Lowest elevation: 371 m (1,217 ft)
- Population (2023): 86
  - Density: 14/km^{2} (36/sq mi)
- Time zone: UTC+01:00 (CET)
  - Summer (DST): UTC+02:00 (CEST)
- INSEE/Postal code: 52207 /52360
- ^{1} French Land Register data, which excludes lakes, ponds, glaciers > 1 km^{2} (0.386 sq mi or 247 acres) and river estuaries.

Frécourt (French pronunciation: [fʁekuʁ]) is a commune in the Haute-Marne department in north-eastern France.

== See also ==
- Communes of the Haute-Marne department
