= Aineffe =

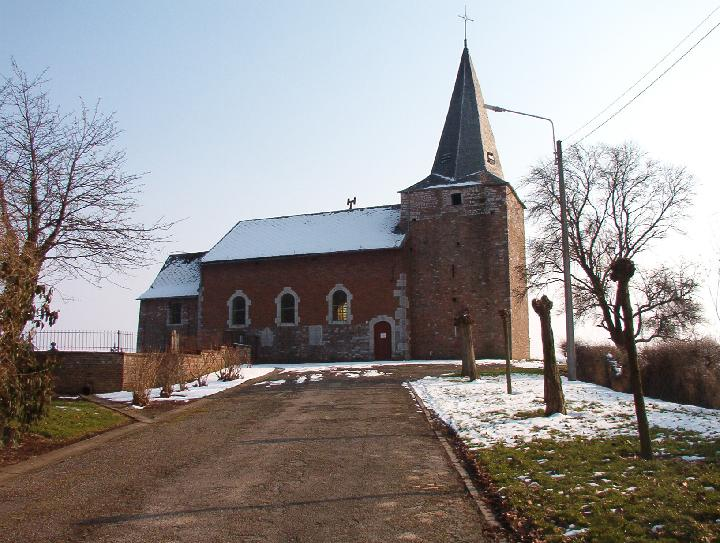
- Aineffe, chapel of Saint Sulpice

- Location within Belgium Location within Europe
- Coordinates: 50°37′19″N 05°15′24″E
- Country: Belgium
- Region: Wallonia
- Province: Liège
- Municipality: Faimes

Aineffe (French pronunciation: [ɛnɛf]) is a village and district of the municipality of Faimes, located in the province of Liège in Wallonia, Belgium.

The earliest mention of the village in written sources dates to 911. There is a small chapel dedicated to Saint Sulpice in the village, originally from the 11th century and still containing some Romanesque elements. There is also a small château in the village.
