= Melay, Haute-Marne =

Melay
- Commune
- Coat of arms
- Location of Melay
- Location within France Location within Grand Est
- Coordinates: 47°53′32″N 5°48′46″E
- Country: France
- Region: Grand Est
- Department: Haute-Marne
- Arrondissement: Langres
- Canton: Bourbonne-les-Bains

Government
  - Mayor (2020–2026): Didier Mourey
- Area^{1}: 13.95 km^{2} (5.39 sq mi)
- Elevation: 275 m (902 ft)
- Population (2023): 240
  - Density: 17/km^{2} (45/sq mi)
- Time zone: UTC+01:00 (CET)
  - Summer (DST): UTC+02:00 (CEST)
- INSEE/Postal code: 52318 /52400
- ^{1} French Land Register data, which excludes lakes, ponds, glaciers > 1 km^{2} (0.386 sq mi or 247 acres) and river estuaries.

Melay (French pronunciation: [məlɛ]) is a commune in the Haute-Marne department in north-eastern France.

== See also ==
- Communes of the Haute-Marne department
