= Dammartin-sur-Meuse =

- Commune
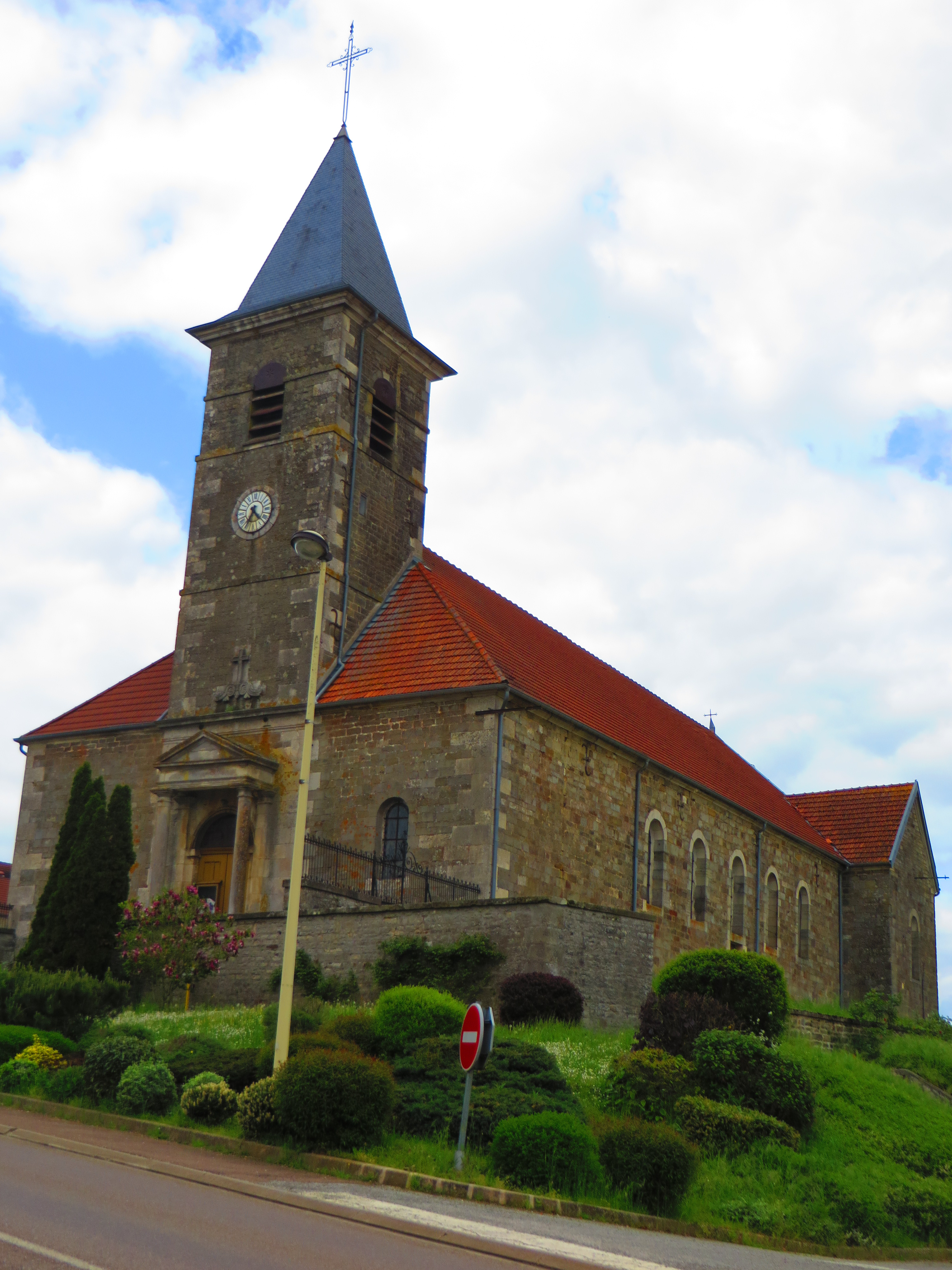
- The church in Dammartin-sur-Meuse

- Coat of arms
- Location of Dammartin-sur-Meuse
- Location within France Location within Grand Est
- Coordinates: 47°58′45″N 5°34′40″E
- Country: France
- Region: Grand Est
- Department: Haute-Marne
- Arrondissement: Langres
- Canton: Bourbonne-les-Bains
- Intercommunality: Grand Langres

Government
  - Mayor (2020–2026): Joël Millé
- Area^{1}: 15.58 km^{2} (6.02 sq mi)
- Elevation: 430 m (1,410 ft)
- Population (2023): 206
  - Density: 13.2/km^{2} (34.2/sq mi)
- Demonym(s): Dammartinois, Dammartinoises
- Time zone: UTC+01:00 (CET)
  - Summer (DST): UTC+02:00 (CEST)
- INSEE/Postal code: 52162 /52140
- ^{1} French Land Register data, which excludes lakes, ponds, glaciers > 1 km^{2} (0.386 sq mi or 247 acres) and river estuaries.

Dammartin-sur-Meuse (French pronunciation: [damaʁtɛ̃ syʁ møz], literally Dammartin on Meuse) is a commune in the Haute-Marne department in north-eastern France.

== See also ==
- Communes of the Haute-Marne department
