= Perrusse =

- Commune
- Location of Perrusse
- Location within France Location within Grand Est
- Coordinates: 48°05′51″N 5°28′55″E
- Country: France
- Region: Grand Est
- Department: Haute-Marne
- Arrondissement: Chaumont
- Canton: Bourbonne-les-Bains

Government
  - Mayor (2020–2026): Frédéric Laurent
- Area^{1}: 5.61 km^{2} (2.17 sq mi)
- Elevation: 441 m (1,447 ft)
- Population (2023): 28
  - Density: 5.0/km^{2} (13/sq mi)
- Time zone: UTC+01:00 (CET)
  - Summer (DST): UTC+02:00 (CEST)
- INSEE/Postal code: 52385 /52240
- ^{1} French Land Register data, which excludes lakes, ponds, glaciers > 1 km^{2} (0.386 sq mi or 247 acres) and river estuaries.

Perrusse (French pronunciation: [peʁys]) is a commune in the Haute-Marne department in north-eastern France.

== See also ==
- Communes of the Haute-Marne department
