= Marcilly-en-Bassigny =

- Commune
- Location of Marcilly-en-Bassigny
- Location within France Location within Grand Est
- Coordinates: 47°53′47″N 5°31′24″E
- Country: France
- Region: Grand Est
- Department: Haute-Marne
- Arrondissement: Langres
- Canton: Bourbonne-les-Bains
- Intercommunality: Grand Langres

Government
  - Mayor (2020–2026): Jean-François Koch
- Area^{1}: 19.56 km^{2} (7.55 sq mi)
- Elevation: 362 m (1,188 ft)
- Population (2023): 220
  - Density: 11/km^{2} (29/sq mi)
- Time zone: UTC+01:00 (CET)
  - Summer (DST): UTC+02:00 (CEST)
- INSEE/Postal code: 52311 /52360
- ^{1} French Land Register data, which excludes lakes, ponds, glaciers > 1 km^{2} (0.386 sq mi or 247 acres) and river estuaries.

Marcilly-en-Bassigny (French pronunciation: [maʁsiji ɑ̃ basiɲi]) is a commune in the Haute-Marne department in north-eastern France.

== See also ==
- Communes of the Haute-Marne department
