= Coiffy-le-Haut =

- Commune
- Coat of arms
- Location of Coiffy-le-Haut
- Location within France Location within Grand Est
- Coordinates: 47°54′34″N 5°42′01″E
- Country: France
- Region: Grand Est
- Department: Haute-Marne
- Arrondissement: Langres
- Canton: Bourbonne-les-Bains

Government
  - Mayor (2022–2026): Aurore Vincent
- Area^{1}: 9.65 km^{2} (3.73 sq mi)
- Highest elevation: 426 m (1,398 ft)
- Lowest elevation: 248 m (814 ft)
- Population (2023): 106
  - Density: 11.0/km^{2} (28.4/sq mi)
- Demonym: Cofféens
- Time zone: UTC+01:00 (CET)
  - Summer (DST): UTC+02:00 (CEST)
- INSEE/Postal code: 52136 /52400
- ^{1} French Land Register data, which excludes lakes, ponds, glaciers > 1 km^{2} (0.386 sq mi or 247 acres) and river estuaries.

Coiffy-le-Haut (French pronunciation: [kwafi lə o]) is a commune in the Haute-Marne department in north-eastern France. The current mayor of Coiffy-le-Haut is Aurore Vincent who will be in office until 2026.

== See also ==
- Communes of the Haute-Marne department
