= Chauffourt =

- Commune
- Location of Chauffourt
- Location within France Location within Grand Est
- Coordinates: 47°58′31″N 5°25′58″E
- Country: France
- Region: Grand Est
- Department: Haute-Marne
- Arrondissement: Langres
- Canton: Bourbonne-les-Bains
- Intercommunality: Grand Langres

Government
  - Mayor (2020–2026): Nicolas Thomassin
- Area^{1}: 9.63 km^{2} (3.72 sq mi)
- Elevation: 392 m (1,286 ft)
- Population (2023): 180
  - Density: 19/km^{2} (48/sq mi)
- Demonym(s): Chauffourtois, Chauffourtoises
- Time zone: UTC+01:00 (CET)
  - Summer (DST): UTC+02:00 (CEST)
- INSEE/Postal code: 52120 /52140
- ^{1} French Land Register data, which excludes lakes, ponds, glaciers > 1 km^{2} (0.386 sq mi or 247 acres) and river estuaries.

Chauffourt (French pronunciation: [ʃofuʁ]) is a commune in the Haute-Marne department in north-eastern France.

== See also ==
- Communes of the Haute-Marne department
