= Neuvelle-lès-Voisey =

- Commune
- Location of Neuvelle-lès-Voisey
- Location within France Location within Grand Est
- Coordinates: 47°52′05″N 5°47′29″E
- Country: France
- Region: Grand Est
- Department: Haute-Marne
- Arrondissement: Langres
- Canton: Bourbonne-les-Bains

Government
  - Mayor (2020–2026): Daniel Pluriel
- Area^{1}: 5.65 km^{2} (2.18 sq mi)
- Elevation: 246 m (807 ft)
- Highest elevation: 378 m (1,240 ft)
- Lowest elevation: 225 m (738 ft)
- Population (2023): 68
  - Density: 12/km^{2} (31/sq mi)
- Time zone: UTC+01:00 (CET)
  - Summer (DST): UTC+02:00 (CEST)
- INSEE/Postal code: 52350 /52400
- ^{1} French Land Register data, which excludes lakes, ponds, glaciers > 1 km^{2} (0.386 sq mi or 247 acres) and river estuaries.

Neuvelle-lès-Voisey (French pronunciation: [nøvɛl lɛ vwazɛ], literally Neuvelle near Voisey) is a commune in the Haute-Marne department in north-eastern France. As of 1 January 2022, the village had 67 resident inhabitants plus a large number of second home owners that spend only part of the year there. The village belongs to the arrondissement of Langres. The inhabitants are called Neuvillois and Neuvilloises .

== See also ==
- Communes of the Haute-Marne department
