= List of protected heritage sites in Faimes =

This table shows an overview of the protected heritage sites in the Walloon town Faimes. This list is part of Belgium's national heritage.

Object	Year/architect	Town/section	Address	Coordinates	Number^{?}	Image
Shell keep ^{(nl)} ^{(fr)}		Faimes	rue Armand Heptia, à côté du n°1 (M), et alentours (S)	50.663211°N 5.259786°E	64076-CLT-0001-01 Info	Motte
farmhouse ^{(nl)} ^{(fr)}		Faimes	rue Armand Heptia, n°1	50.662514°N 5.259377°E	64076-CLT-0002-01 Info	
Tumulus of Saivres ^{(nl)} ^{(fr)}		Faimes		50.658203°N 5.239377°E	64076-CLT-0003-01 Info	Tumulus van Saives, het ensemble dat de grafheuvel vormt met zijn directe omgeving
Castle Pecsteen and Lambrechts ^{(nl)} ^{(fr)}		Faimes		50.663836°N 5.237018°E	64076-CLT-0004-01 Info	Ensemble, bestaande uit kasteel Pecsteen en Lambrechts, de kerk en gebied daaromheen
Chapel Saive ^{(nl)} ^{(fr)}		Faimes		50.663528°N 5.239309°E	64076-CLT-0005-01 Info	Kapel Saives
Chapel Saint-Sulpice ^{(nl)} ^{(fr)}		Faimes	rue Grimont	50.622115°N 5.257039°E	64076-CLT-0006-01 Info	
Castle Les Waleffes ^{(nl)} ^{(fr)}		Les Waleffes Faimes	rue de Borlez, n°s 43-45	50.636837°N 5.229075°E	64076-CLT-0007-01 Info	Les Waleffes (kasteel)
Chapel Our Lady of Mercy and two linden trees ^{(nl)} ^{(fr)}		Faimes	rue du Bon Dieu d'Ans	50.647282°N 5.247207°E	64076-CLT-0008-01 Info	
Church of St. Madelberte ^{(nl)} ^{(fr)}		Celles Faimes		50.654182°N 5.245268°E	64076-CLT-0009-01 Info	Kerk ('Sainte-Madelberte'): toren
Chapel St. Blaise ^{(nl)} ^{(fr)}		Faimes		50.663982°N 5.236757°E	64076-CLT-0010-01 Info	Kapel ('Saint-Blaise') en omgeving
Castle with lane of linden trees ^{(nl)} ^{(fr)}		Faimes		50.624440°N 5.256934°E	64076-CLT-0011-01 Info	
Chapel of St. Agrapha ^{(nl)} ^{(fr)}		Faimes	rue d'Aineffe	50.630388°N 5.248335°E	64076-CLT-0012-01 Info	Kapel ('Saint-Agrapha') en de omgeving met bomen
Tumulus of Saives archeological site ^{(nl)} ^{(fr)}		Faimes		50.658203°N 5.239377°E	64076-PEX-0001-01 Info	Tumulus van Saives, de archeologische site van de tumulus
Castle Les Waleffes ^{(nl)} ^{(fr)}		Les Waleffes Faimes		50.636837°N 5.229075°E	64076-PEX-0002-01 Info	Kasteel Les Waleffe: De gevels en daken van het kasteel van Waleffe-Saint-Pierre en bijgebouwen, binnen het centrale orgaan en de kapel, met uitzondering van de boerderij. Met betrekking tot de elementen van het interieur: het voorportaal, de grote trap, de Chinese kamer en de kapel

== See also ==
- List of protected heritage sites in Liège (province)
- Faimes
