= Sarrey =

- Commune
- Location of Sarrey
- Location within France Location within Grand Est
- Coordinates: 48°00′17″N 5°25′39″E
- Country: France
- Region: Grand Est
- Department: Haute-Marne
- Arrondissement: Langres
- Canton: Bourbonne-les-Bains
- Intercommunality: Grand Langres

Government
  - Mayor (2020–2026): Anne Debeury
- Area^{1}: 14.21 km^{2} (5.49 sq mi)
- Elevation: 351 m (1,152 ft)
- Population (2023): 363
  - Density: 25.5/km^{2} (66.2/sq mi)
- Time zone: UTC+01:00 (CET)
  - Summer (DST): UTC+02:00 (CEST)
- INSEE/Postal code: 52461 /52140
- ^{1} French Land Register data, which excludes lakes, ponds, glaciers > 1 km^{2} (0.386 sq mi or 247 acres) and river estuaries.

Sarrey (French pronunciation: [saʁɛ]) is a commune in the Haute-Marne department in north-eastern France.

== See also ==
- Communes of the Haute-Marne department
