= Noreña =

- Municipality
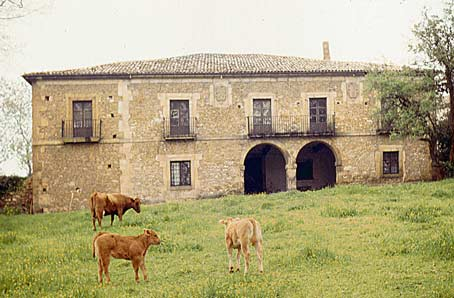
- Palacio del Rebollín

- Flag Coat of arms

- Location of Noreña

- Location in Spain Noreña (Spain)
- Coordinates: 43°23′36″N 5°42′15″W
- Country: Spain
- Autonomous community: Asturias
- Province: Asturias
- Comarca: Oviedo
- Capital: Noreña

Government
  - Alcalde: Amparo Antuña Suárez (IPÑ)

Area
  - Total: 5.29 km^{2} (2.04 sq mi)
- Elevation: 522 m (1,713 ft)

Population (2025-01-01)
  - Total: 5,131
  - Density: 970/km^{2} (2,510/sq mi)
- Demonym: noreñense
- Time zone: UTC+1 (CET)
  - Summer (DST): UTC+2 (CEST)
- Postal code: 33180, 33189, 33519
- Official language(s): Asturian, Spanish
- Website: Official website

Noreña is a municipality in the Autonomous Community of the Principality of Asturias, Spain. It is surrounded by the municipality of Siero. It is the smallest municipality in Asturias and the second smallest in Spain, and one of the ones with the highest per capita income and population density in the Principality. Noreña is also the name of a parish in the municipality, and the municipal capital.

== Parishes ==
- Celles (San Juan de Celles)
- Noreña (Santa María de Noreña)
- Santa Marina

== Notable people ==
- Alberto Colunga Cueto, Dominican priest and Bible translator, was born in Noreña.
- Enrique Rodríguez Bustelo, architect
- Pedro Álvarez de Asturias (d 1286) Lord of Norena

== Gallery ==
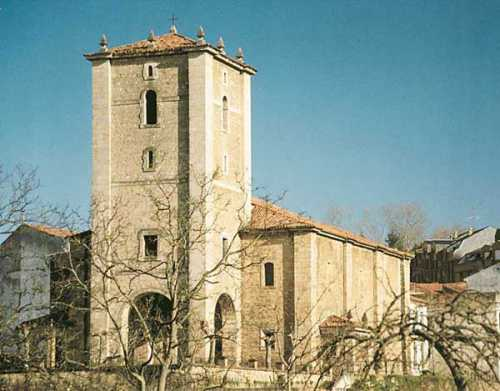
'Santa María de Noreña' Church

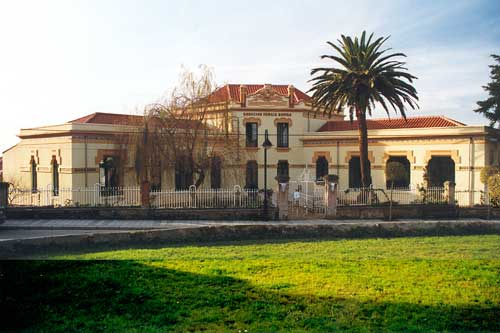
Rionda Alonso Foundation School

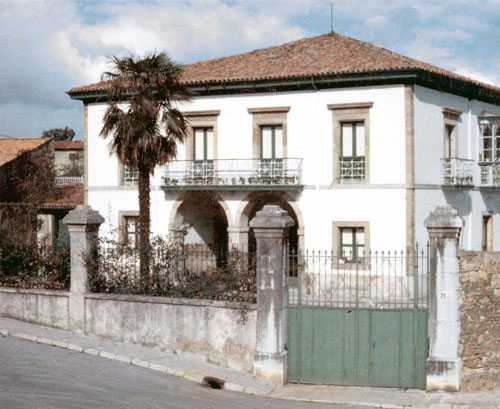
Typical house of this municipality

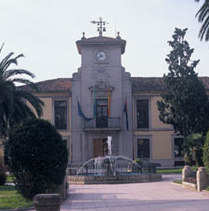
Townhall

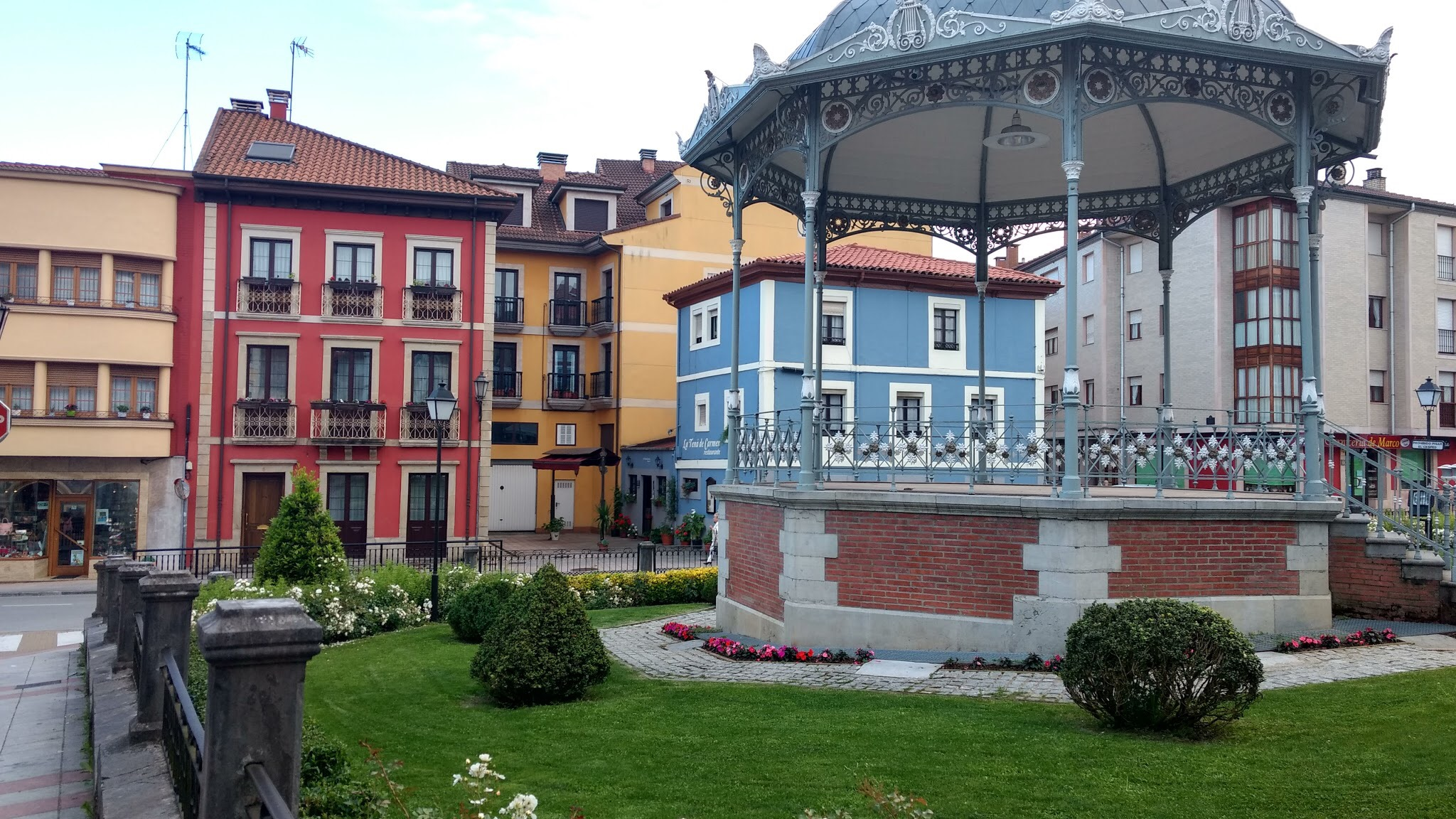
Bandstand Square

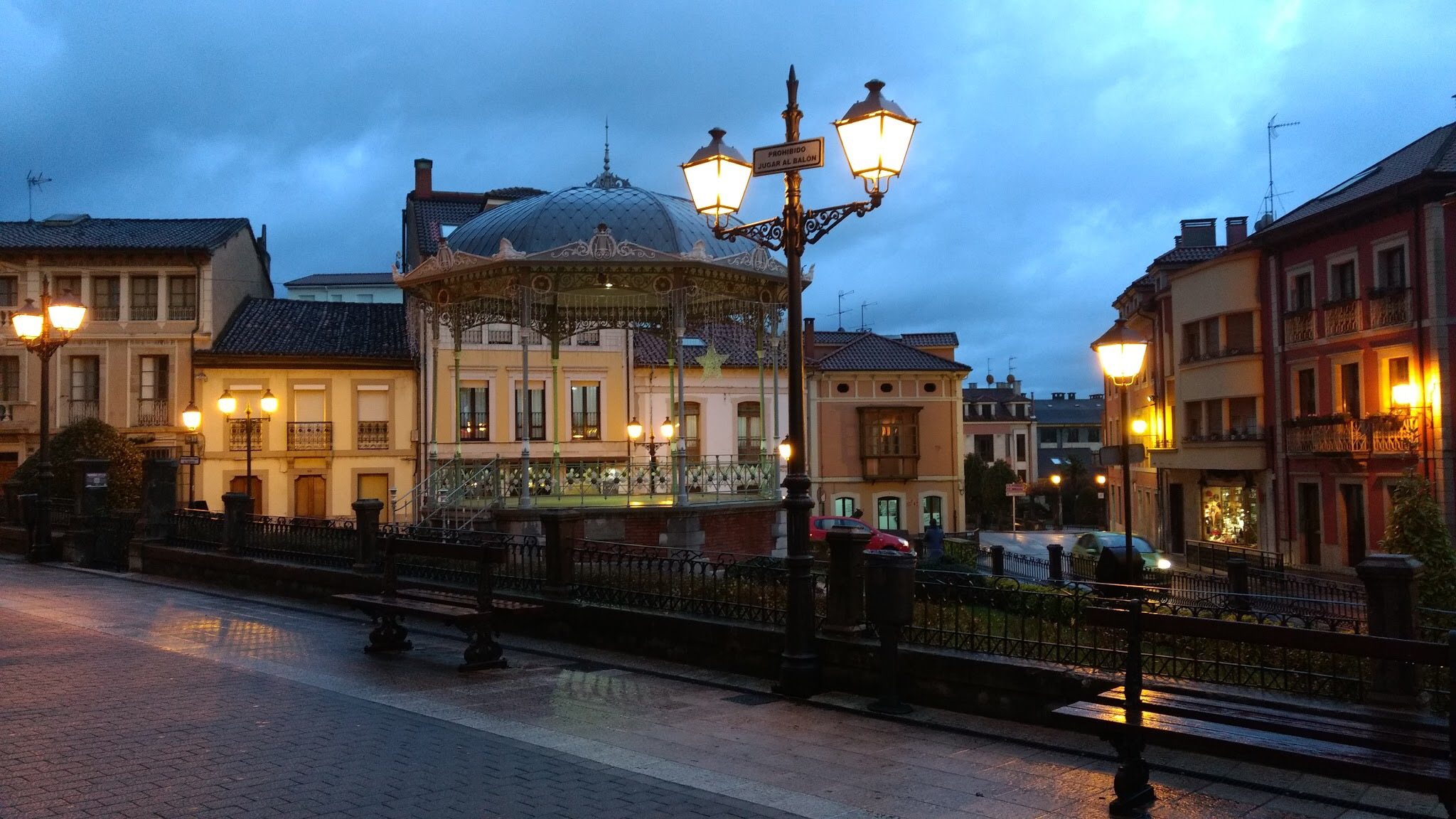
Bandstand Square

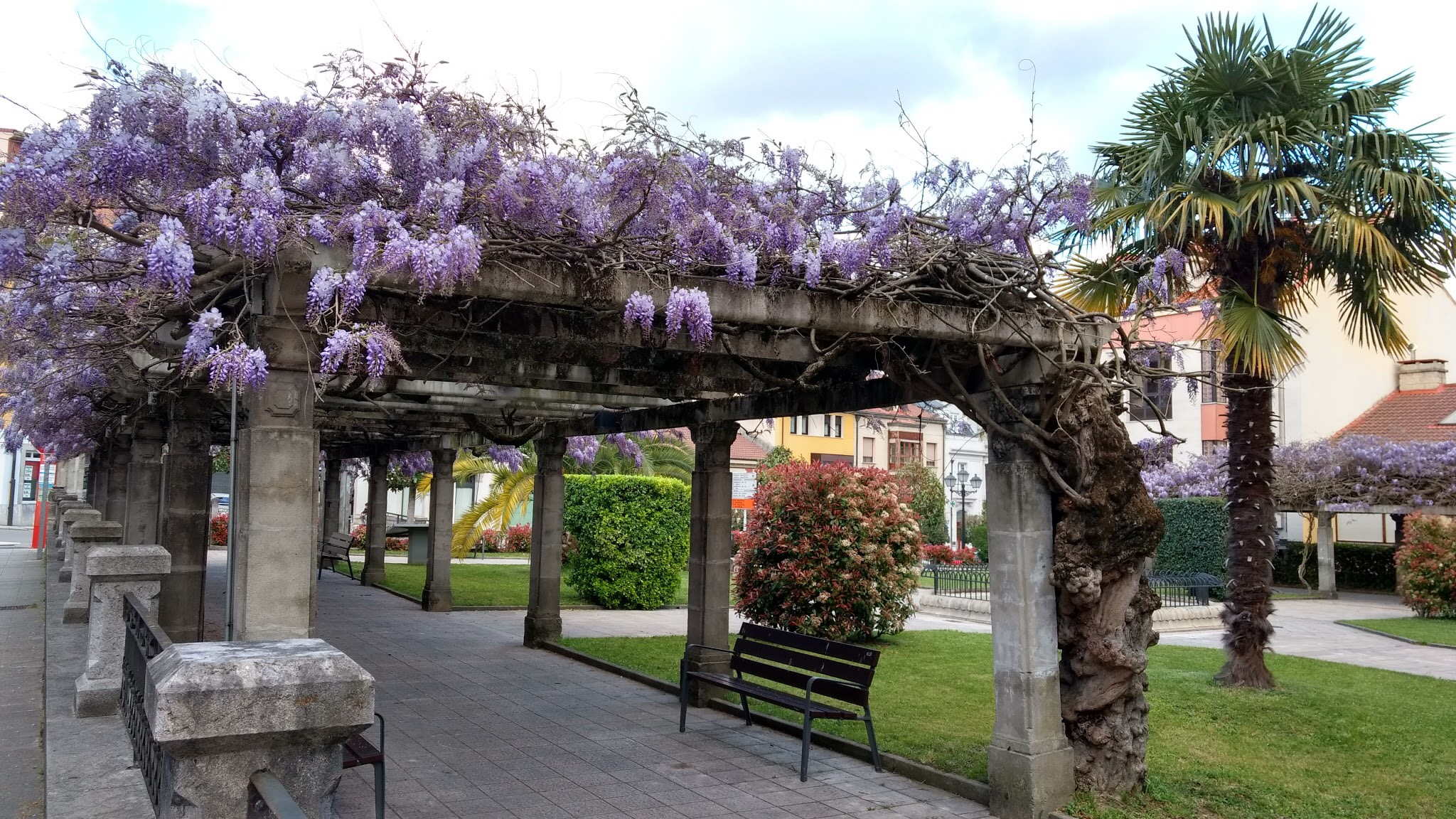
Townhall Square

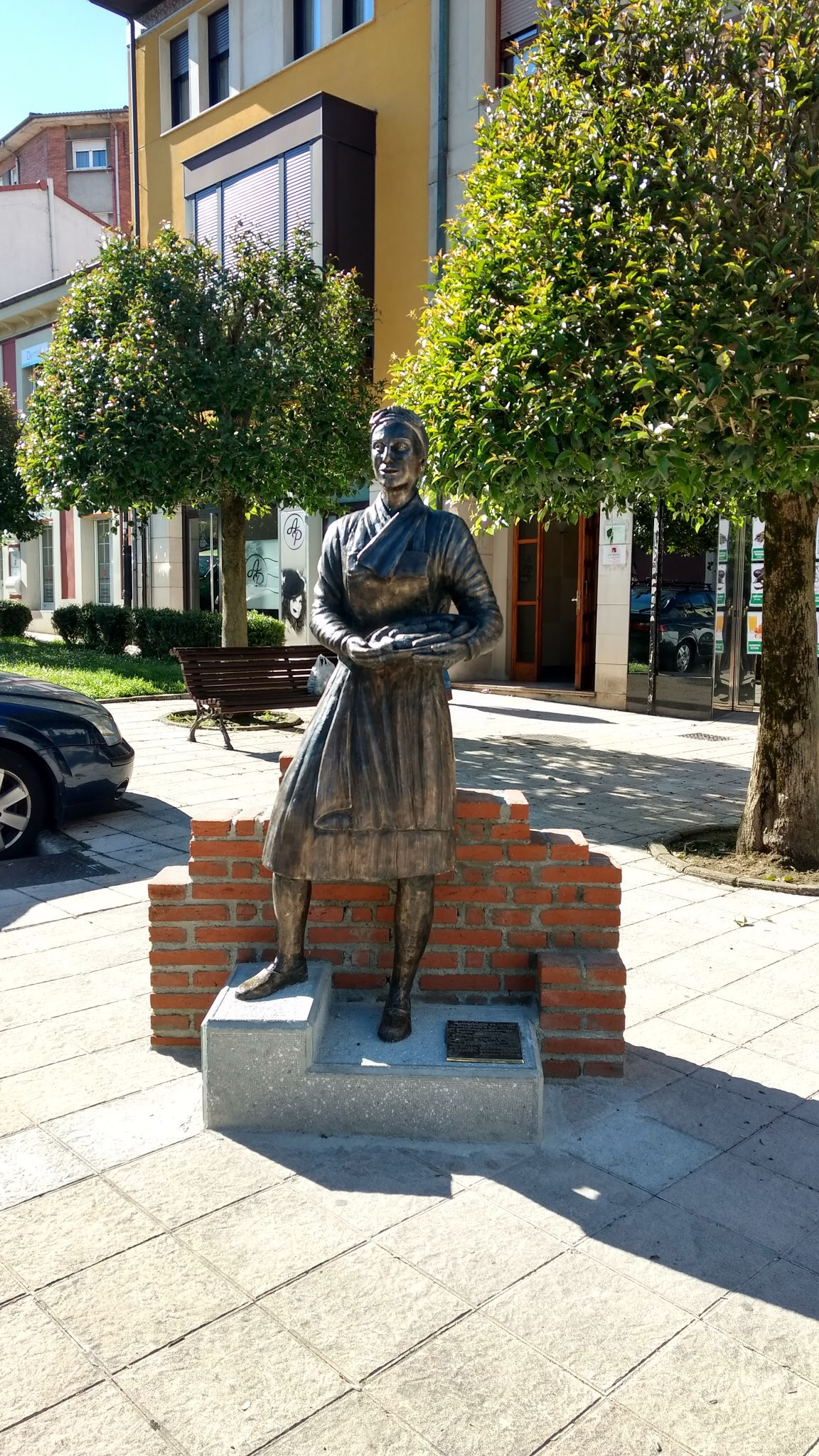
Woman Statue

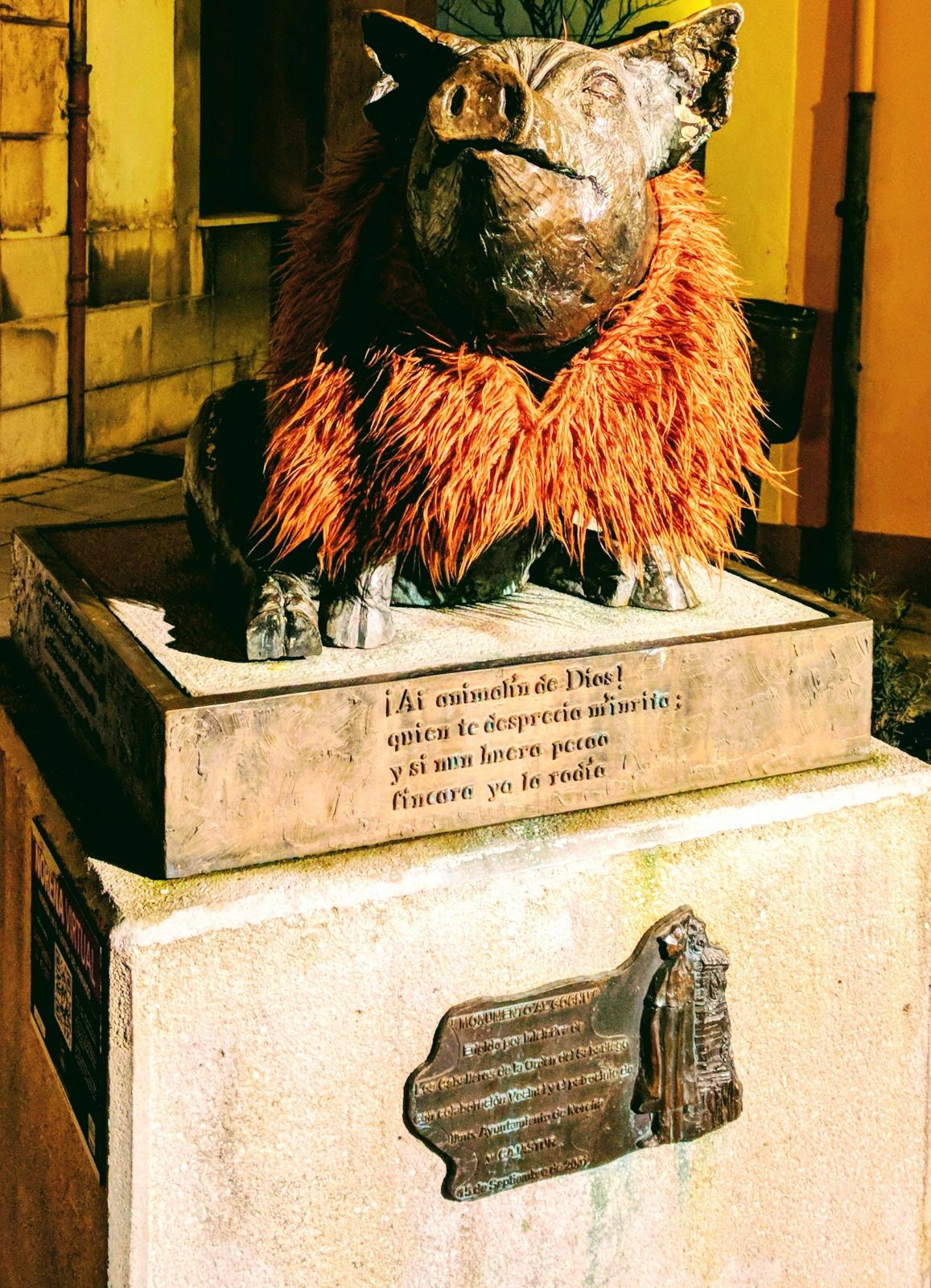
Pig Statue 'El Gochín'

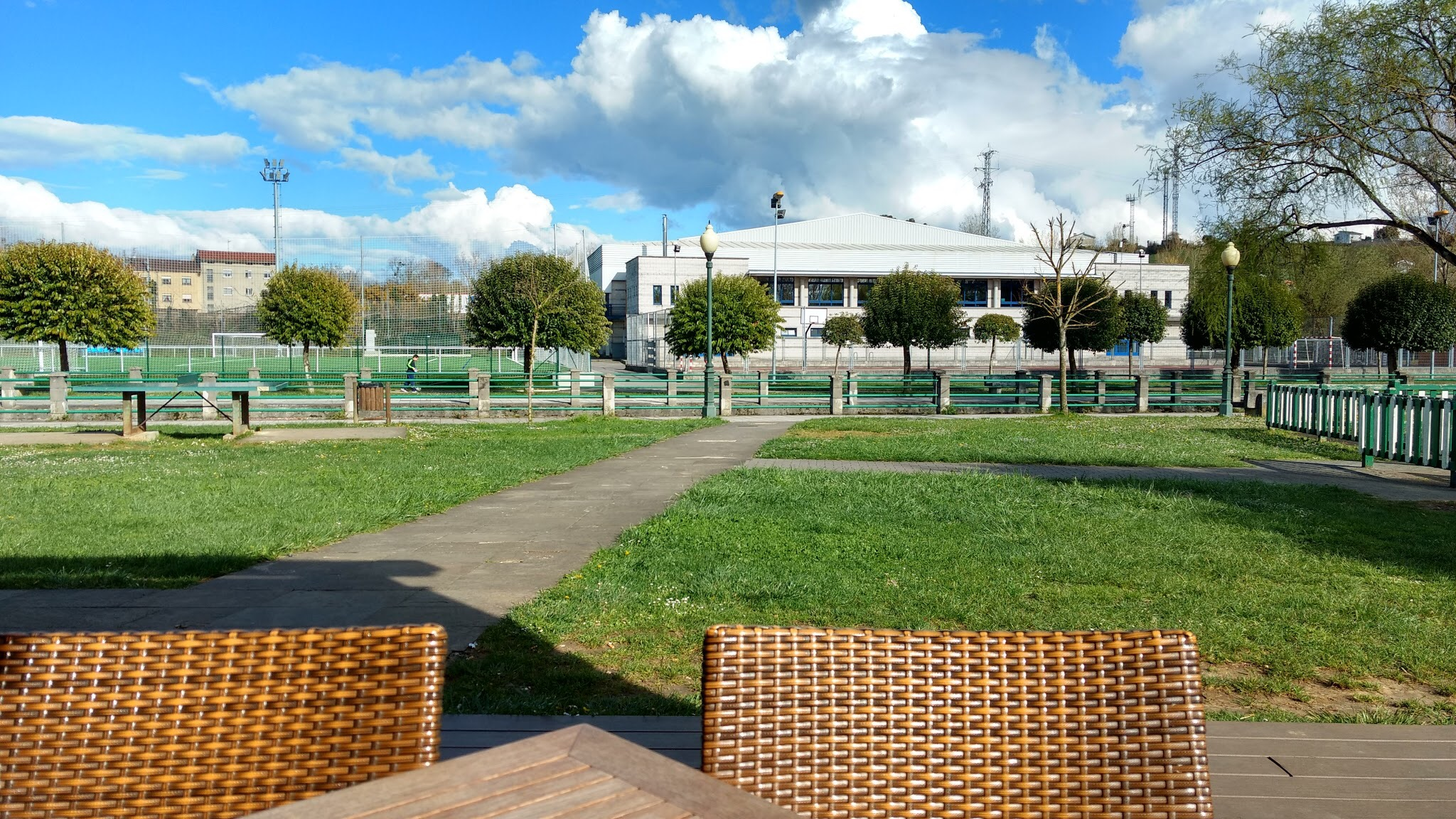
Sports Center

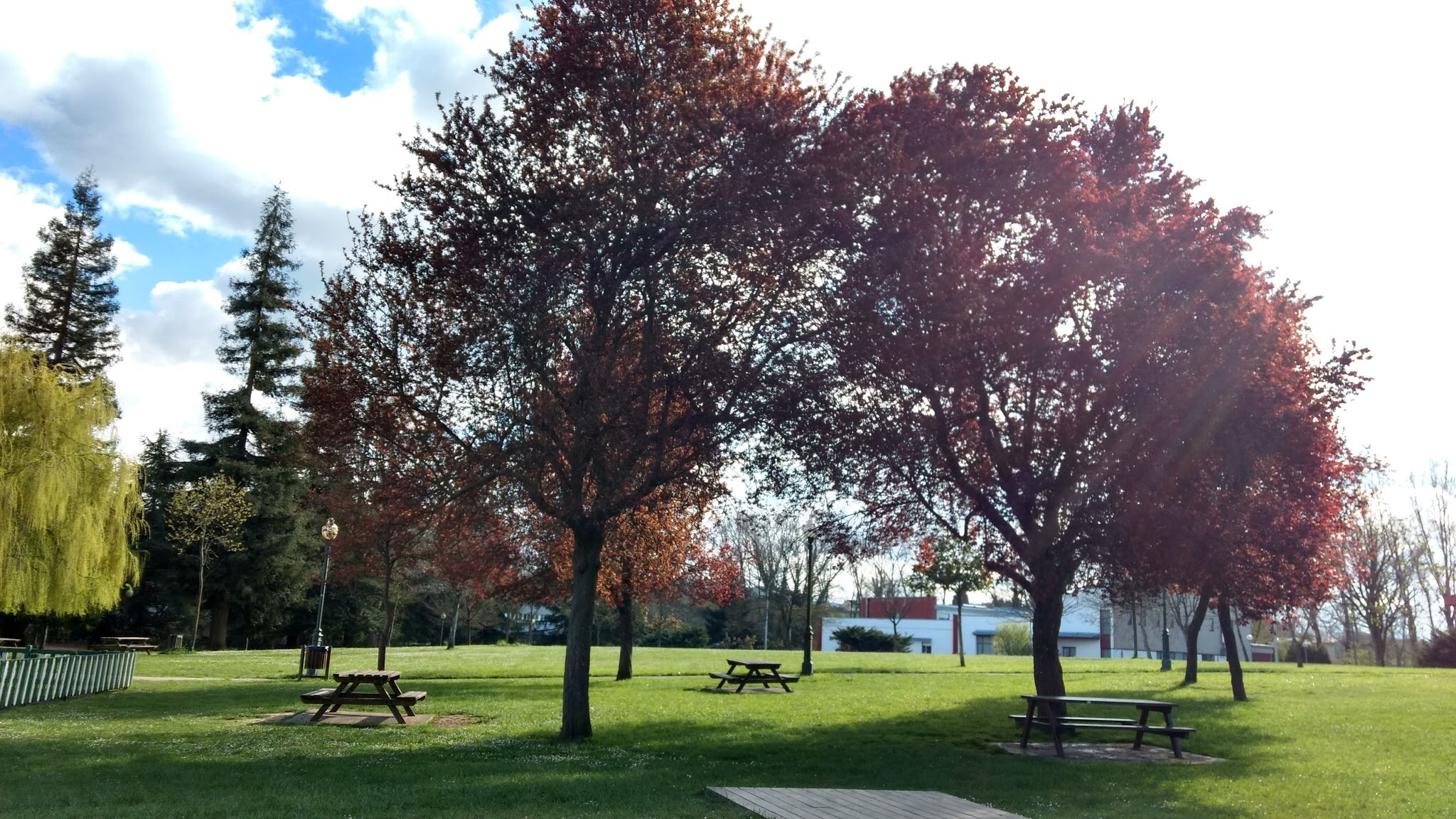
Los Riegos Park

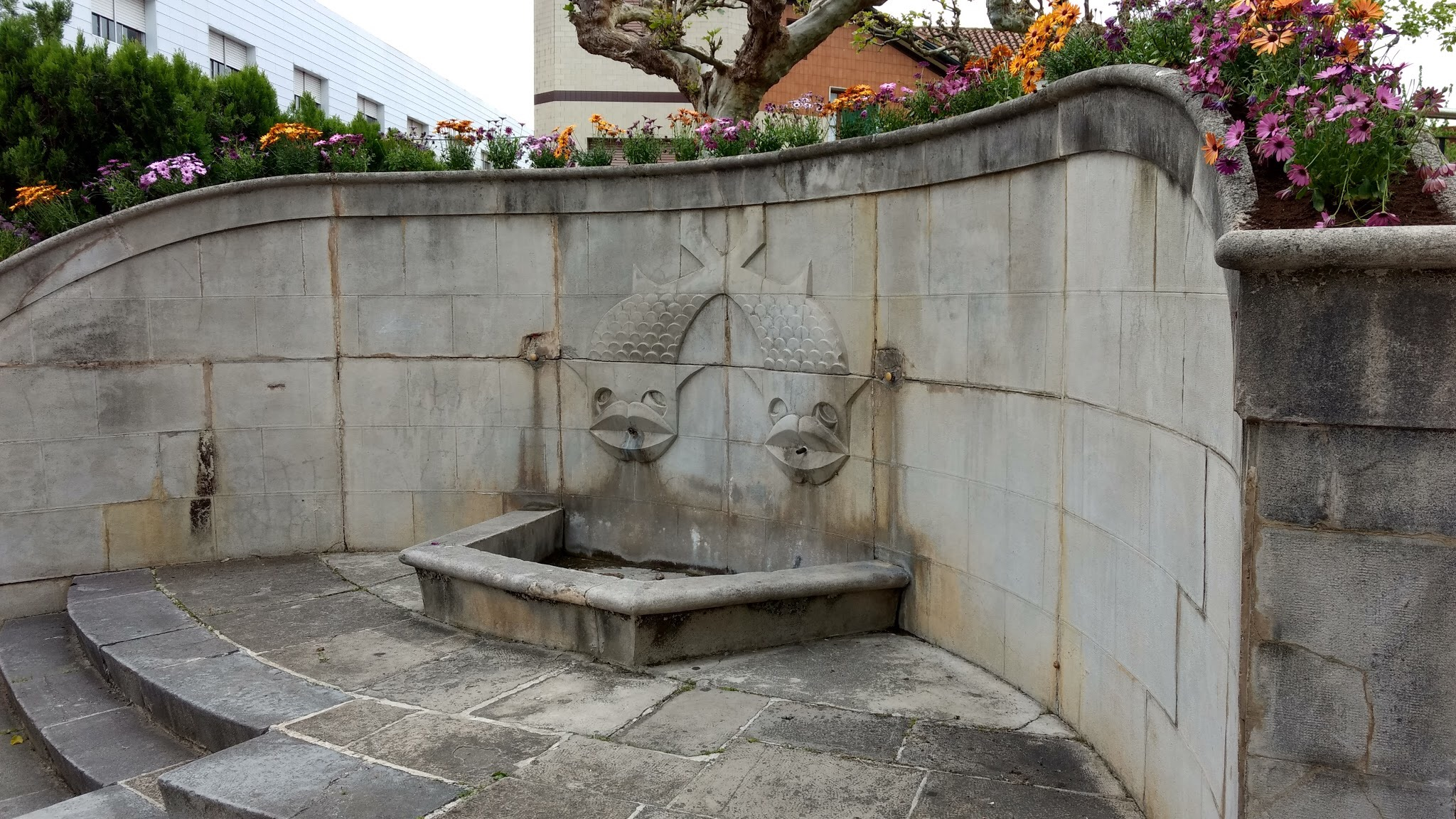
Fountain

== See also ==
- List of municipalities in Asturias
