= Is-en-Bassigny =

- Commune
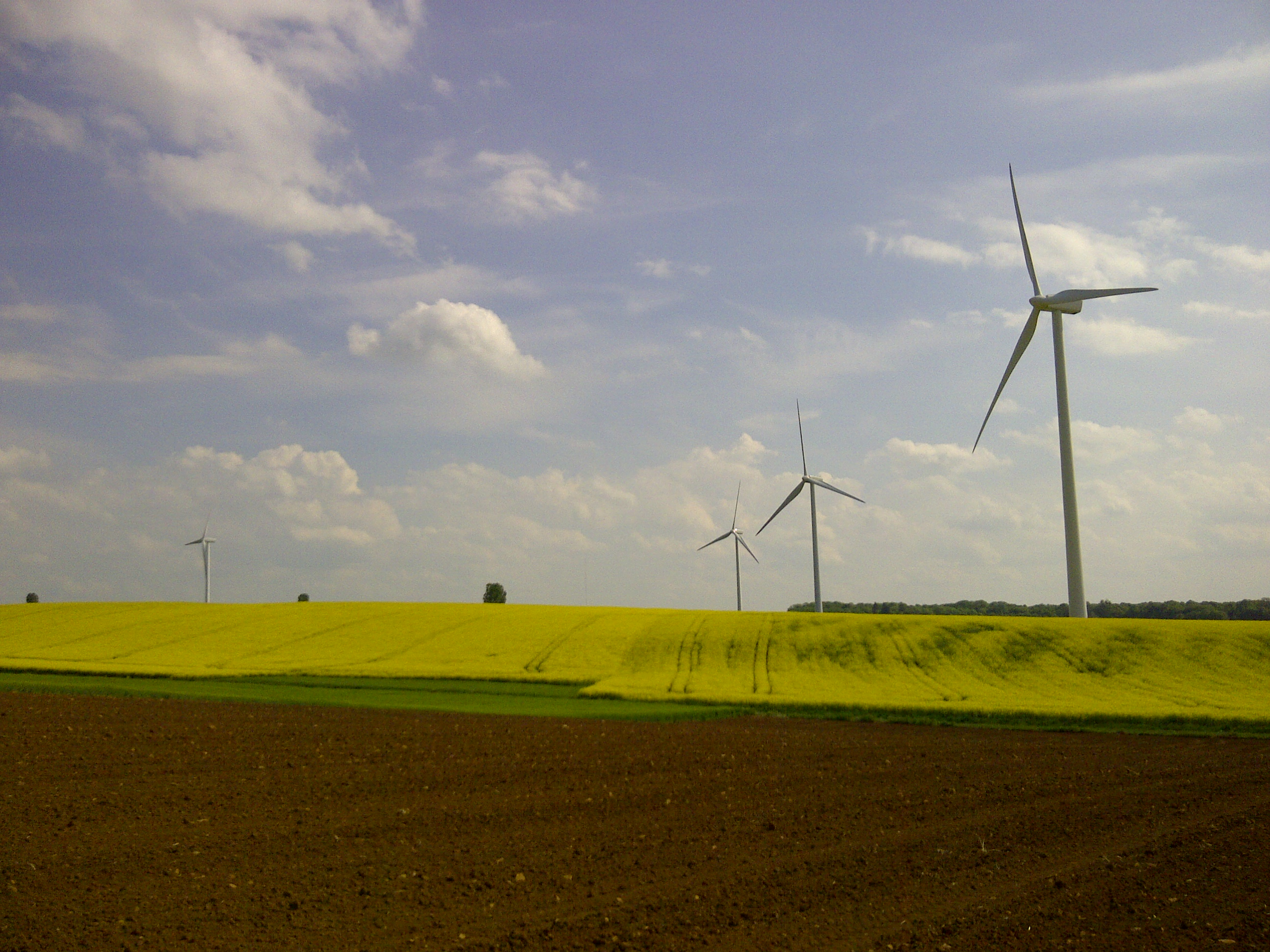
- The wind farm in Is-en-Bassigny
- Location of Is-en-Bassigny
- Location within France Location within Grand Est
- Coordinates: 48°01′58″N 5°26′52″E
- Country: France
- Region: Grand Est
- Department: Haute-Marne
- Arrondissement: Chaumont
- Canton: Bourbonne-les-Bains
- Intercommunality: Grand Langres

Government
  - Mayor (2020–2026): Charles Martin
- Area^{1}: 19.37 km^{2} (7.48 sq mi)
- Elevation: 401 m (1,316 ft)
- Population (2023): 530
  - Density: 27/km^{2} (71/sq mi)
- Time zone: UTC+01:00 (CET)
  - Summer (DST): UTC+02:00 (CEST)
- INSEE/Postal code: 52248 /52140
- ^{1} French Land Register data, which excludes lakes, ponds, glaciers > 1 km^{2} (0.386 sq mi or 247 acres) and river estuaries.

Is-en-Bassigny (French pronunciation: [is ɑ̃ basiɲi]) is a commune in the Haute-Marne department, northeastern France.

== Climate ==
On average, Is-en-Bassigny experiences 72.9 days per year with a minimum temperature below 0 °C (32.0 °F), 2.8 days per year with a minimum temperature below −10 °C (14.0 °F), 13.4 days per year with a maximum temperature below 0 °C (32.0 °F), and 8.8 days per year with a maximum temperature above 30 °C (86.0 °F). The record high temperature was 38.7 °C (101.7 °F) on July 25, 2019, while the record low temperature was −19.3 °C (−2.7 °F) on December 20, 2009.

Climate data for Is-en-Bassigny (1991–2020 normals, extremes 1991–present)
Month	Jan	Feb	Mar	Apr	May	Jun	Jul	Aug	Sep	Oct	Nov	Dec	Year
Record high °C (°F)	14.2 (57.6)	22.4 (72.3)	23.7 (74.7)	26.6 (79.9)	32.4 (90.3)	34.7 (94.5)	38.7 (101.7)	37.7 (99.9)	32.2 (90.0)	28.6 (83.5)	20.2 (68.4)	15.6 (60.1)	38.7 (101.7)
Mean daily maximum °C (°F)	4.2 (39.6)	6.0 (42.8)	10.4 (50.7)	14.5 (58.1)	18.5 (65.3)	22.4 (72.3)	24.7 (76.5)	24.3 (75.7)	19.6 (67.3)	14.3 (57.7)	8.3 (46.9)	5.0 (41.0)	14.4 (57.8)
Daily mean °C (°F)	1.7 (35.1)	2.8 (37.0)	6.0 (42.8)	9.2 (48.6)	13.1 (55.6)	16.6 (61.9)	18.7 (65.7)	18.4 (65.1)	14.4 (57.9)	10.5 (50.9)	5.5 (41.9)	2.6 (36.7)	10.0 (49.9)
Mean daily minimum °C (°F)	−0.8 (30.6)	−0.4 (31.3)	1.6 (34.9)	4.0 (39.2)	7.7 (45.9)	10.8 (51.4)	12.6 (54.7)	12.6 (54.7)	9.3 (48.7)	6.7 (44.1)	2.8 (37.0)	0.3 (32.5)	5.6 (42.1)
Record low °C (°F)	−15.6 (3.9)	−16.3 (2.7)	−16.7 (1.9)	−5.7 (21.7)	−1.7 (28.9)	0.5 (32.9)	4.1 (39.4)	3.1 (37.6)	−0.3 (31.5)	−6.7 (19.9)	−11.8 (10.8)	−19.3 (−2.7)	−19.3 (−2.7)
Average precipitation mm (inches)	79.6 (3.13)	61.1 (2.41)	65.5 (2.58)	58.9 (2.32)	81.1 (3.19)	61.3 (2.41)	73.0 (2.87)	66.3 (2.61)	63.0 (2.48)	85.9 (3.38)	88.5 (3.48)	89.4 (3.52)	873.6 (34.38)
Average precipitation days (≥ 1.0 mm)	12.6	10.4	10.4	10.2	11.4	9.3	9.6	9.3	8.5	11.7	12.2	13.6	129.2
Source: Meteociel

== See also ==
- Communes of the Haute-Marne department
