= Fresnes-sur-Apance =

- Commune
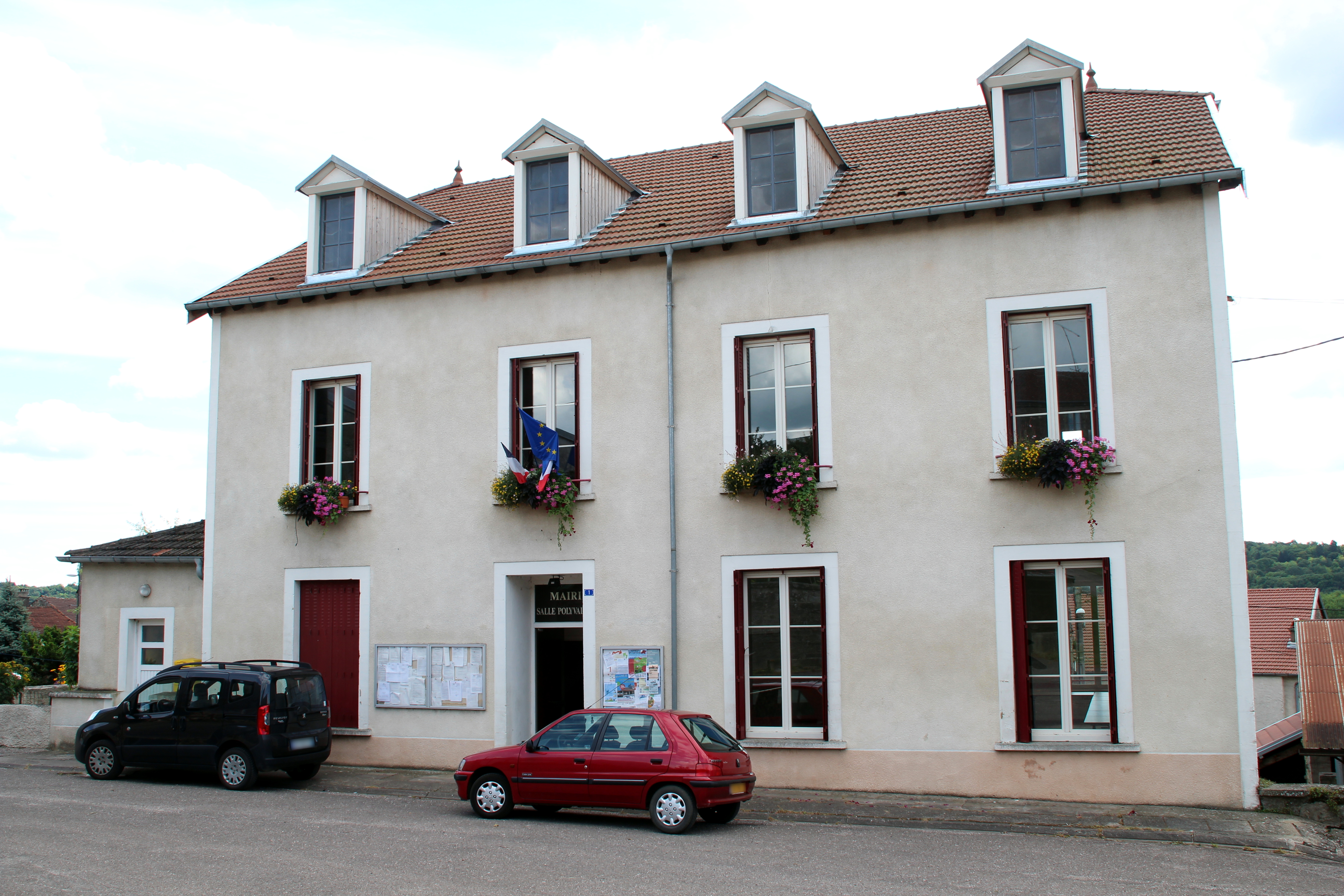
- The town hall in Fresnes-sur-Apance

- Coat of arms
- Location of Fresnes-sur-Apance
- Location within France Location within Grand Est
- Coordinates: 47°56′31″N 5°50′07″E
- Country: France
- Region: Grand Est
- Department: Haute-Marne
- Arrondissement: Langres
- Canton: Bourbonne-les-Bains

Government
  - Mayor (2021–2026): Nathalie Blanc
- Area^{1}: 16.47 km^{2} (6.36 sq mi)
- Elevation: 280 m (920 ft)
- Population (2023): 159
  - Density: 9.65/km^{2} (25.0/sq mi)
- Time zone: UTC+01:00 (CET)
  - Summer (DST): UTC+02:00 (CEST)
- INSEE/Postal code: 52208 /52400
- ^{1} French Land Register data, which excludes lakes, ponds, glaciers > 1 km^{2} (0.386 sq mi or 247 acres) and river estuaries.

Fresnes-sur-Apance (French pronunciation: [fʁɛn syʁ apɑ̃s], literally Fresnes on Apance) is a commune in the Haute-Marne department in north-eastern France.

== See also ==
- Communes of the Haute-Marne department
