= Val-de-Meuse =

- Commune
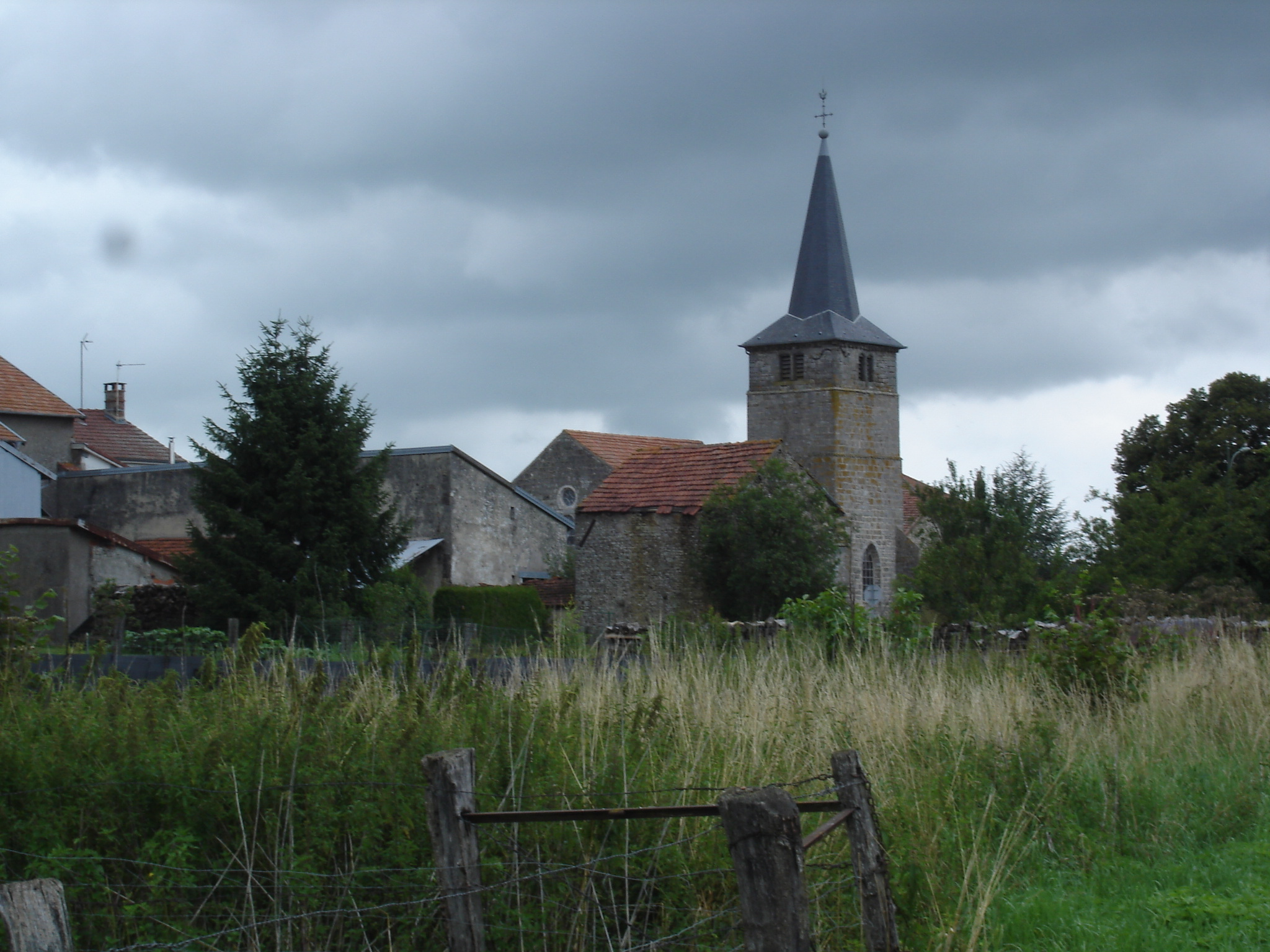
- The church of Lénizeul in Val-de-Meuse

- Coat of arms
- Location of Val-de-Meuse
- Location within France Location within Grand Est
- Coordinates: 48°00′01″N 5°29′48″E
- Country: France
- Region: Grand Est
- Department: Haute-Marne
- Arrondissement: Langres
- Canton: Bourbonne-les-Bains
- Intercommunality: Grand Langres

Government
  - Mayor (2020–2026): Romary Didier
- Area^{1}: 92.56 km^{2} (35.74 sq mi)
- Elevation: 420 m (1,380 ft)
- Population (2023): 1,801
  - Density: 19.46/km^{2} (50.40/sq mi)
- Time zone: UTC+01:00 (CET)
  - Summer (DST): UTC+02:00 (CEST)
- INSEE/Postal code: 52332 /52140
- ^{1} French Land Register data, which excludes lakes, ponds, glaciers > 1 km^{2} (0.386 sq mi or 247 acres) and river estuaries.

Val-de-Meuse (French pronunciation: [val də møz]; lit. 'Vale of Meuse') is a commune in the Haute-Marne department in northeastern France.

Val-de-Meuse was created in 1972 by the merger of the former communes of Avrecourt, Épinant, Lécourt, Maulain, Montigny-le-Roi (seat of the new commune), Provenchères-sur-Meuse, Ravennefontaines, Récourt and Saulxures and in 1974 Lénizeul. In 2012 Avrecourt and Saulxures became independent communes again.

== See also ==
- Communes of the Haute-Marne department
