= Noyers, Haute-Marne =

Noyers
- Commune
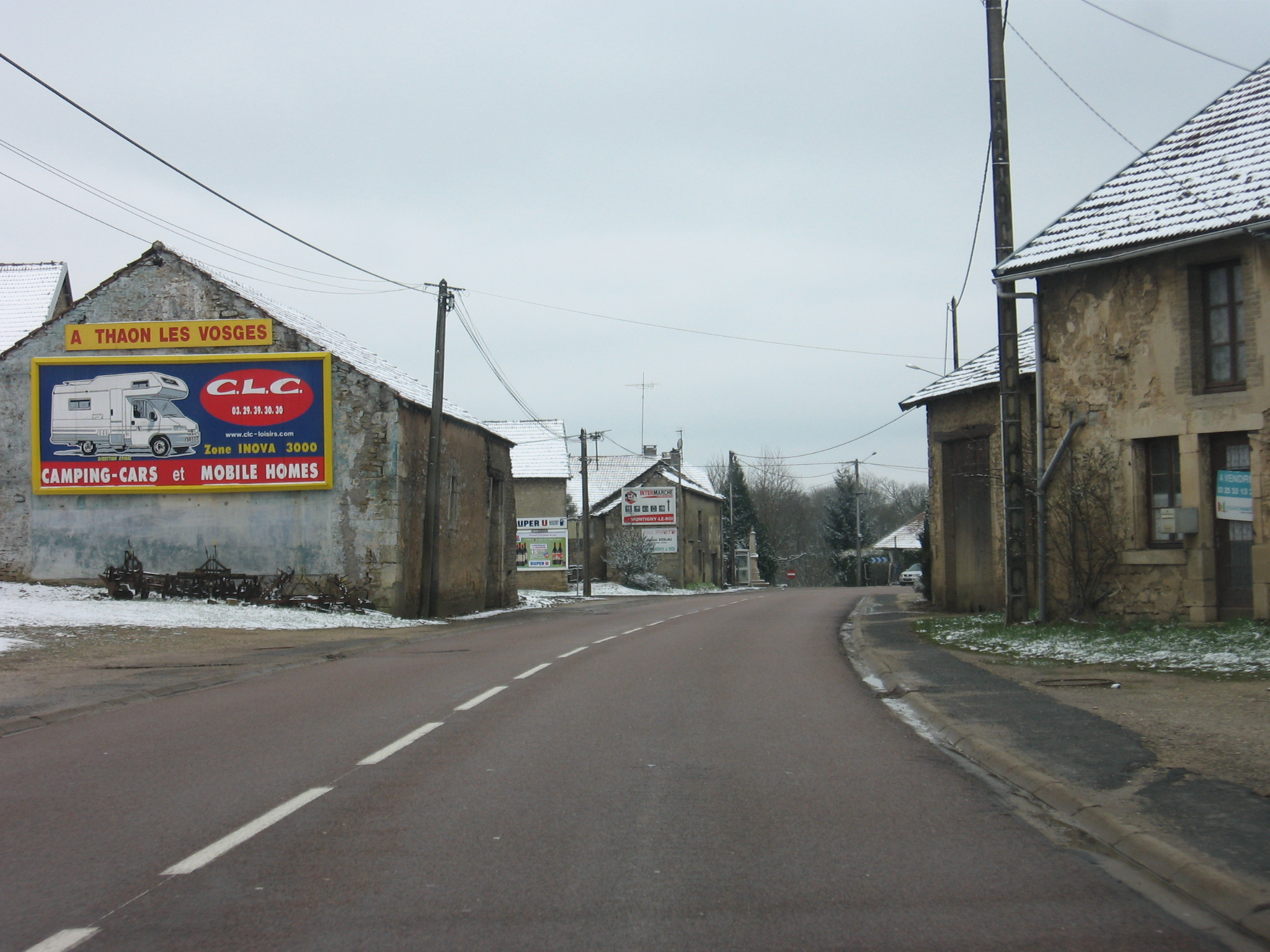
- A view within Noyers
- Location of Noyers
- Location within France Location within Grand Est
- Coordinates: 48°03′43″N 5°29′11″E
- Country: France
- Region: Grand Est
- Department: Haute-Marne
- Arrondissement: Chaumont
- Canton: Bourbonne-les-Bains

Government
  - Mayor (2020–2026): Christian Boilletot
- Area^{1}: 7.29 km^{2} (2.81 sq mi)
- Elevation: 405 m (1,329 ft)
- Population (2023): 97
  - Density: 13/km^{2} (34/sq mi)
- Time zone: UTC+01:00 (CET)
  - Summer (DST): UTC+02:00 (CEST)
- INSEE/Postal code: 52358 /52240
- ^{1} French Land Register data, which excludes lakes, ponds, glaciers > 1 km^{2} (0.386 sq mi or 247 acres) and river estuaries.

Noyers (French pronunciation: [nwaje]) is a commune in the Haute-Marne department in north-eastern France.

== See also ==
- Communes of the Haute-Marne department
