= Buxières-lès-Clefmont =

- Commune
- Coat of arms
- Location of Buxières-lès-Clefmont
- Location within France Location within Grand Est
- Coordinates: 48°05′42″N 5°27′40″E
- Country: France
- Region: Grand Est
- Department: Haute-Marne
- Arrondissement: Chaumont
- Canton: Bourbonne-les-Bains

Government
  - Mayor (2020–2026): Robert Magiron
- Area^{1}: 5.92 km^{2} (2.29 sq mi)
- Elevation: 425 m (1,394 ft)
- Population (2023): 25
  - Density: 4.2/km^{2} (11/sq mi)
- Time zone: UTC+01:00 (CET)
  - Summer (DST): UTC+02:00 (CEST)
- INSEE/Postal code: 52085 /52240
- ^{1} French Land Register data, which excludes lakes, ponds, glaciers > 1 km^{2} (0.386 sq mi or 247 acres) and river estuaries.

Buxières-lès-Clefmont is a commune in the Haute-Marne department in northeastern France.

== Population ==
Historical population
Year	Pop.	±% p.a.
1968	37	—
1975	23	−6.57%
1982	25	+1.20%
1990	16	−5.43%
1999	18	+1.32%
2007	23	+3.11%
2012	23	+0.00%
2017	26	+2.48%
2023	25	−0.65%
Source: INSEE

== See also ==
- Communes of the Haute-Marne department
