= Damrémont =

- Commune
- Location of Damrémont
- Location within France Location within Grand Est
- Coordinates: 47°57′13″N 5°38′30″E
- Country: France
- Region: Grand Est
- Department: Haute-Marne
- Arrondissement: Langres
- Canton: Bourbonne-les-Bains

Government
  - Mayor (2020–2026): David Vaure
- Area^{1}: 4.84 km^{2} (1.87 sq mi)
- Elevation: 427 m (1,401 ft)
- Highest elevation: 437 m (1,434 ft)
- Lowest elevation: 310 m (1,020 ft)
- Population (2023): 198
  - Density: 40.9/km^{2} (106/sq mi)
- Time zone: UTC+01:00 (CET)
  - Summer (DST): UTC+02:00 (CEST)
- INSEE/Postal code: 52164 /52400
- ^{1} French Land Register data, which excludes lakes, ponds, glaciers > 1 km^{2} (0.386 sq mi or 247 acres) and river estuaries.

Damrémont (French pronunciation: [dɑ̃ʁemɔ̃]) is a commune in the Haute-Marne department in north-eastern France.

== See also ==
- Communes of the Haute-Marne department
- Charles-Marie Denys de Damrémont
