= Rangecourt =

- Commune
- Coat of arms
- Location of Rangecourt
- Location within France Location within Grand Est
- Coordinates: 48°02′39″N 5°29′09″E
- Country: France
- Region: Grand Est
- Department: Haute-Marne
- Arrondissement: Chaumont
- Canton: Bourbonne-les-Bains
- Intercommunality: Grand Langres

Government
  - Mayor (2020–2026): Maurice Dartier
- Area^{1}: 6.81 km^{2} (2.63 sq mi)
- Elevation: 366 m (1,201 ft)
- Population (2023): 62
  - Density: 9.1/km^{2} (24/sq mi)
- Demonym(s): Rangecourtois, Rangecourtoises
- Time zone: UTC+01:00 (CET)
  - Summer (DST): UTC+02:00 (CEST)
- INSEE/Postal code: 52416 /52140
- ^{1} French Land Register data, which excludes lakes, ponds, glaciers > 1 km^{2} (0.386 sq mi or 247 acres) and river estuaries.

Rangecourt is a commune in the Haute-Marne department in north-eastern France.

== See also ==
- Communes of the Haute-Marne department
