= Avrecourt =

- Commune
- Coat of arms
- Location of Avrecourt
- Location within France Location within Grand Est
- Coordinates: 47°57′46″N 5°32′15″E
- Country: France
- Region: Grand Est
- Department: Haute-Marne
- Arrondissement: Langres
- Canton: Bourbonne-les-Bains

Government
  - Mayor (2020–2026): Alain Lambert
- Area^{1}: 10.1 km^{2} (3.9 sq mi)
- Population (2023): 117
  - Density: 11.6/km^{2} (30.0/sq mi)
- Time zone: UTC+01:00 (CET)
  - Summer (DST): UTC+02:00 (CEST)
- INSEE/Postal code: 52033 /52140
- ^{1} French Land Register data, which excludes lakes, ponds, glaciers > 1 km^{2} (0.386 sq mi or 247 acres) and river estuaries.

Avrecourt (French pronunciation: [avʁəkuʁ]) is a commune in the Haute-Marne department in north-eastern France. Between 1972 and 2012 it was part of the commune Val-de-Meuse.

== See also ==
- Communes of the Haute-Marne department
