= Canton of Bourbonne-les-Bains =

Coordinates: 47.95°N 5.75°E

The canton of Bourbonne-les-Bains is an administrative division of the Haute-Marne department, northeastern France. Its borders were modified at the French canton reorganisation which came into effect in March 2015. Its seat is in Bourbonne-les-Bains.

It consists of the following communes:

1. Aigremont
2. Avrecourt
3. Bourbonne-les-Bains
4. Buxières-lès-Clefmont
5. Celles-en-Bassigny
6. Le Châtelet-sur-Meuse
7. Chauffourt
8. Choiseul
9. Clefmont
10. Coiffy-le-Haut
11. Daillecourt
12. Dammartin-sur-Meuse
13. Damrémont
14. Enfonvelle
15. Frécourt
16. Fresnes-sur-Apance
17. Is-en-Bassigny
18. Laneuvelle
19. Larivière-Arnoncourt
20. Lavernoy
21. Lavilleneuve
22. Marcilly-en-Bassigny
23. Melay
24. Montcharvot
25. Neuvelle-lès-Voisey
26. Noyers
27. Parnoy-en-Bassigny
28. Perrusse
29. Rançonnières
30. Rangecourt
31. Sarrey
32. Saulxures
33. Serqueux
34. Val-de-Meuse
35. Vicq
36. Voisey
