= Saulxures, Haute-Marne =

Saulxures
- Commune
- Location of Saulxures
- Location within France Location within Grand Est
- Coordinates: 47°57′18″N 5°35′13″E
- Country: France
- Region: Grand Est
- Department: Haute-Marne
- Arrondissement: Langres
- Canton: Bourbonne-les-Bains
- Area^{1}: 8.3 km^{2} (3.2 sq mi)
- Population (2023): 137
  - Density: 17/km^{2} (43/sq mi)
- Time zone: UTC+01:00 (CET)
  - Summer (DST): UTC+02:00 (CEST)
- INSEE/Postal code: 52465 /52140
- ^{1} French Land Register data, which excludes lakes, ponds, glaciers > 1 km^{2} (0.386 sq mi or 247 acres) and river estuaries.

Saulxures is a commune in the Haute-Marne department in north-eastern France. Between 1972 and 2012 it was part of the commune Val-de-Meuse.

== See also ==
- Communes of the Haute-Marne department
