= Celles, Faimes =

Celles
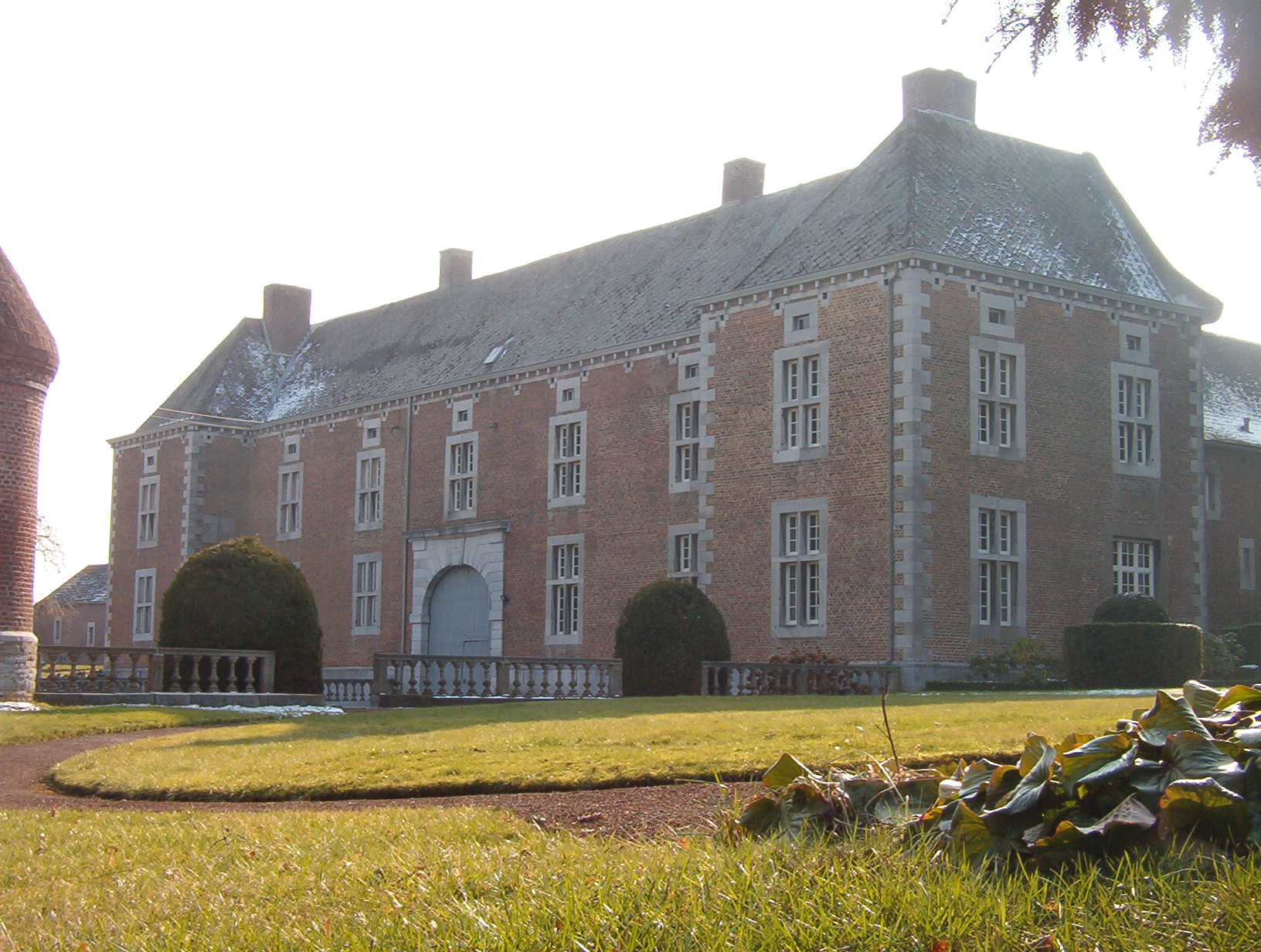
- Celles, the château in Saives

- Location within Belgium Location within Europe
- Coordinates: 50°39′15″N 05°14′43″E
- Country: Belgium
- Region: Wallonia
- Province: Liège
- Municipality: Faimes

Celles (French pronunciation: [sɛl]) is a district of the municipality of Faimes, located in the province of Liège in Wallonia, Belgium. It consists of the village of Celles and the hamlet of Saives.

The oldest discovered human settlements in the area date from prehistoric times. Celles has a village church with an intact medieval tower. In Saives, there is a château dating from the 16th century and a chapel built in 1754.
