= Gilles Châtelet =

French philosopher and mathematician

- Born: 2 February 1944; Paris, France
- Died: 11 June 1999 (aged 55); Paris, France

Philosophical work
- Era: 20th-century philosophy
- Region: Western philosophy Mathematics
- Main interests: Mathematics, Geometry, Culture Industry, Political economy

Gilles Châtelet (2 February 1944 – 11 June 1999) was a French philosopher and mathematician.

== Biography ==
Châtelet began studying at the École Normale Supérieure Fontenay-Saint-Cloud-Lyon in 1963. During the student upheavals of the late 1960s and the following years, he was a member of the Communist Party and associated with the Front homosexuel d'action révolutionnaire (FHAR). He became a gay activist due to his time in California in 1969, but went to the FHAR as a "way of finding again the ambiance of the United States." He later studied at University of Paris XI where he obtained his PhD in pure mathematics on 20 December 1975 and wrote his thesis on differential topology.

Châtelet became a professor of mathematics in 1979 at the University of Paris VIII St. Denis (the Free University of Vincennes). From 1981 to 1983 he was the scientific attaché at the French embassy in Israel. He was the program director at the International College of Philosophy from 1989 to 1995. He is known to have designed a seminar titled "Love Science Philosophy". In 1994 he joined the Laboratory of Thinking Science which was just founded by Charles Alunni where until his death he taught an influential seminar titled "Action, Power and Virtuality".

He died by suicide in Paris on 11 June 1999.

== Selected works ==
In 1986, he began writing for L'Autre until the journal's closure by its publisher Michel Butel in 1990.

In 1993 Éditions du Seuil published his book Les Enjeux du mobile (Figuring Space), a study of mathematics, physics, and philosophy. In this book, Châtelet tries to reflect on the perception of movement in philosophy, mathematics, and physics by way of using concepts of virtuality and intensive quantities borrowed from Nicole Oresme and Gottfried Wilhelm Leibniz. He presents his conception of the deafening but complicated relationship between mathematics, physics, and philosophy through a comparison between intuition and discourse, and sense and speech.

Chatelet is well known in France for his political pamphlet Vivre et penser comme des Porcs, De l'incitation à l'envie et à l'ennui dans les démocraties-marchés (1998). It was translated as To Live and Think Like Pigs: Envy and Boredom in Market-Economy Democracies (2014). In this polemical essay, he denounced liberalism, arguing that its effectiveness relied on a triple alliance between the tertiary spheres of politics, economics, and cybernetics (or communication technologies).

In a collection of his political writing titled Les Animaux malades (Sick Animals of Consensus), he rejected what he considered as a widespread human domestication process imposed by the New World Order. He called for a new philosophy to combat the disastrous effects of the decomposition of both the libertarian optimism and cynicism which in his opinion had become a pseudo-liberal sham.

== Citation ==
Quotation from To Think and Live Like Pigs: "To promote a work without its own temporality, totally indentured to the social order—whether it comes from the whip and from hunger for indentured labour, or from the mutilated psychology of the cyberzombie for the overclass—a work that cannot be articulated with an intensification of individuation for the great mass of humanity; in short, to content oneself with proliferating particular cases of a species: is this all that we can now hope for from humanity?"
