= Larivière-Arnoncourt =

- Commune
- Location of Larivière-Arnoncourt
- Location within France Location within Grand Est
- Coordinates: 48°01′25″N 5°43′03″E
- Country: France
- Region: Grand Est
- Department: Haute-Marne
- Arrondissement: Langres
- Canton: Bourbonne-les-Bains

Government
  - Mayor (2020–2026): Gilles Collin
- Area^{1}: 20.32 km^{2} (7.85 sq mi)
- Elevation: 350 m (1,150 ft)
- Population (2023): 120
  - Density: 5.9/km^{2} (15/sq mi)
- Time zone: UTC+01:00 (CET)
  - Summer (DST): UTC+02:00 (CEST)
- INSEE/Postal code: 52273 /52400
- ^{1} French Land Register data, which excludes lakes, ponds, glaciers > 1 km^{2} (0.386 sq mi or 247 acres) and river estuaries.

Larivière-Arnoncourt (French pronunciation: [laʁivjɛʁ aʁnɔ̃kuʁ]) is a commune in the Haute-Marne department in north-eastern France.

== History ==
On 1 September 1973, the communes of Arnoncourt-sur-Apance and Larivière-sur-Apance joined together as part of the associated communes movement, creating Larivière-Arnoncourt.

== See also ==
- Communes of the Haute-Marne department
