= Celles-en-Bassigny =

- Commune
- Location of Celles-en-Bassigny
- Location within France Location within Grand Est
- Coordinates: 47°54′56″N 5°32′36″E
- Country: France
- Region: Grand Est
- Department: Haute-Marne
- Arrondissement: Langres
- Canton: Bourbonne-les-Bains
- Intercommunality: Grand Langres

Government
  - Mayor (2020–2026): Anne-Marie Rousseau
- Area^{1}: 8.92 km^{2} (3.44 sq mi)
- Elevation: 330 m (1,080 ft)
- Population (2023): 71
  - Density: 8.0/km^{2} (21/sq mi)
- Time zone: UTC+01:00 (CET)
  - Summer (DST): UTC+02:00 (CEST)
- INSEE/Postal code: 52089 /52360
- ^{1} French Land Register data, which excludes lakes, ponds, glaciers > 1 km^{2} (0.386 sq mi or 247 acres) and river estuaries.

Celles-en-Bassigny (French pronunciation: [sɛl ɑ̃ basiɲi]) is a commune in the Haute-Marne department in north-eastern France.

== See also ==
- Communes of the Haute-Marne department
