= Celles (Noreña) =

Celles/Ceis
- Parish
- Location within Spain
- Coordinates: 43.416667°N 5.683333°W
- Country: Spain
- Autonomous community: Asturias
- Province: Asturias
- Municipality: Noreña

Celles (in Asturian Ceis and officially Celles/Ceis) is one of three parishes (administrative divisions) in Noreña, a municipality within the province and autonomous community of Asturias, in northern Spain.

== Villages ==
- La Braña
- La Carril
- La Felguera
- La Peral
- Otero
- San Andrés
- Serrapicón
