= Faimes =

Municipality in Liège Province, Wallonia, Belgium

Faimes Faime (Walloon)
- Municipality
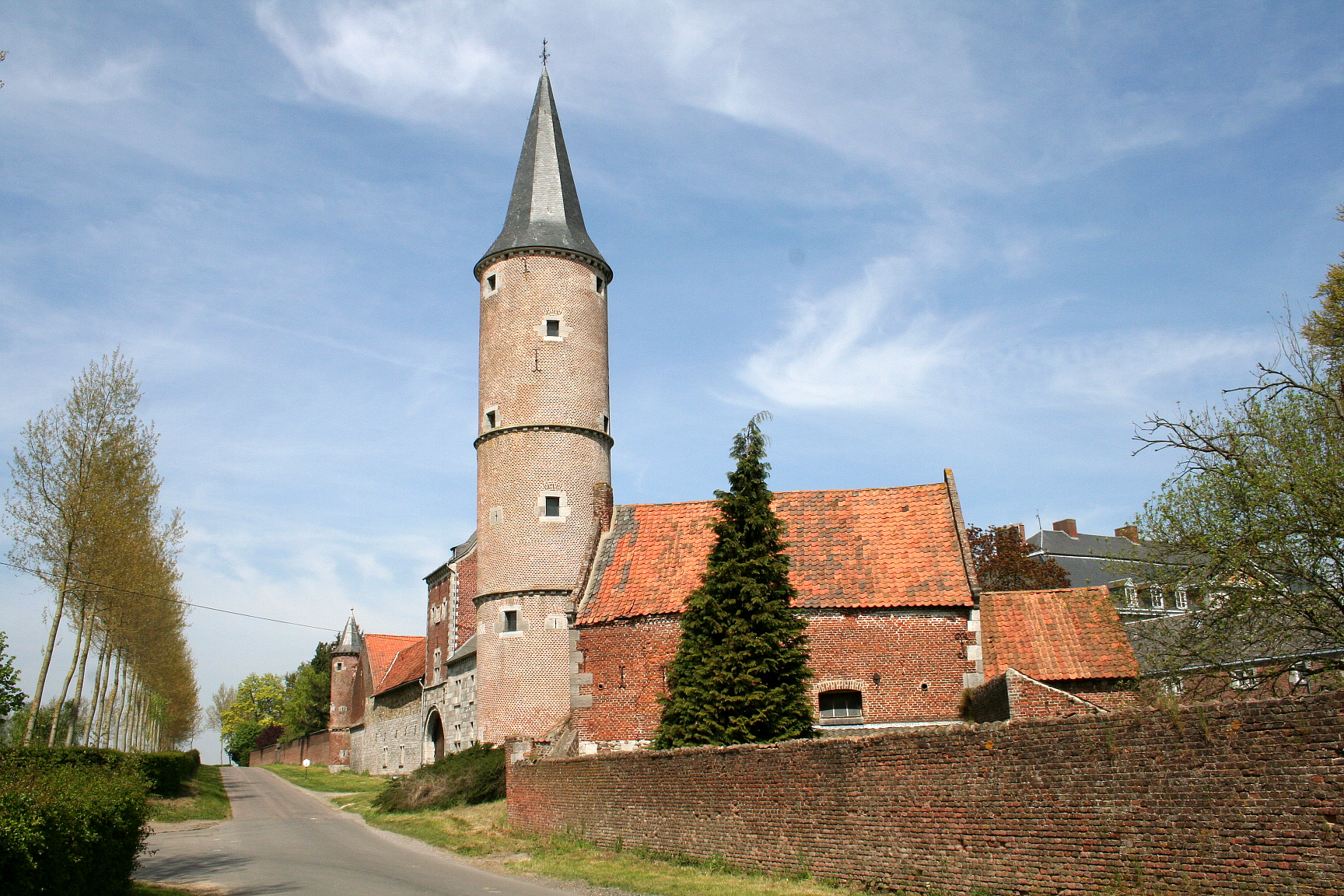
- Les Waleffes, the castle (18th century)

- Coat of arms

- Location of Faimes in the province of Liège
- Interactive map of Faimes
- Location in Belgium
- Coordinates: 50°40′N 05°16′E
- Country: Belgium
- Community: French Community
- Region: Wallonia
- Province: Liège
- Arrondissement: Waremme

Government
  - Mayor: Jean-Marc Delchambre (MR)
  - Governing party: Équipe de Faimes (EDF)

Area
  - Total: 28.53 km^{2} (11.02 sq mi)

Population (2018-01-01)
  - Total: 3,947
  - Density: 138.3/km^{2} (358.3/sq mi)
- Postal codes: 4317
- NIS code: 64076
- Area codes: 019
- Website: www.faimes.be

Faimes (French pronunciation: [fɛm]; Walloon: Faime) is a municipality of Wallonia located in the province of Liège, Belgium.

On January 1, 2025, Faimes has a total population of 4,201. The total area is 28.47 km^{2} (10.99 sq mi) which gives a population density of 148 inhabitants per km^{2}.

The municipality consists of the following villages: Aineffe, Borlez, Celles, Les Waleffes, and Viemme. The eponymous Faimes is a hamlet within Celles.

== Image gallery ==
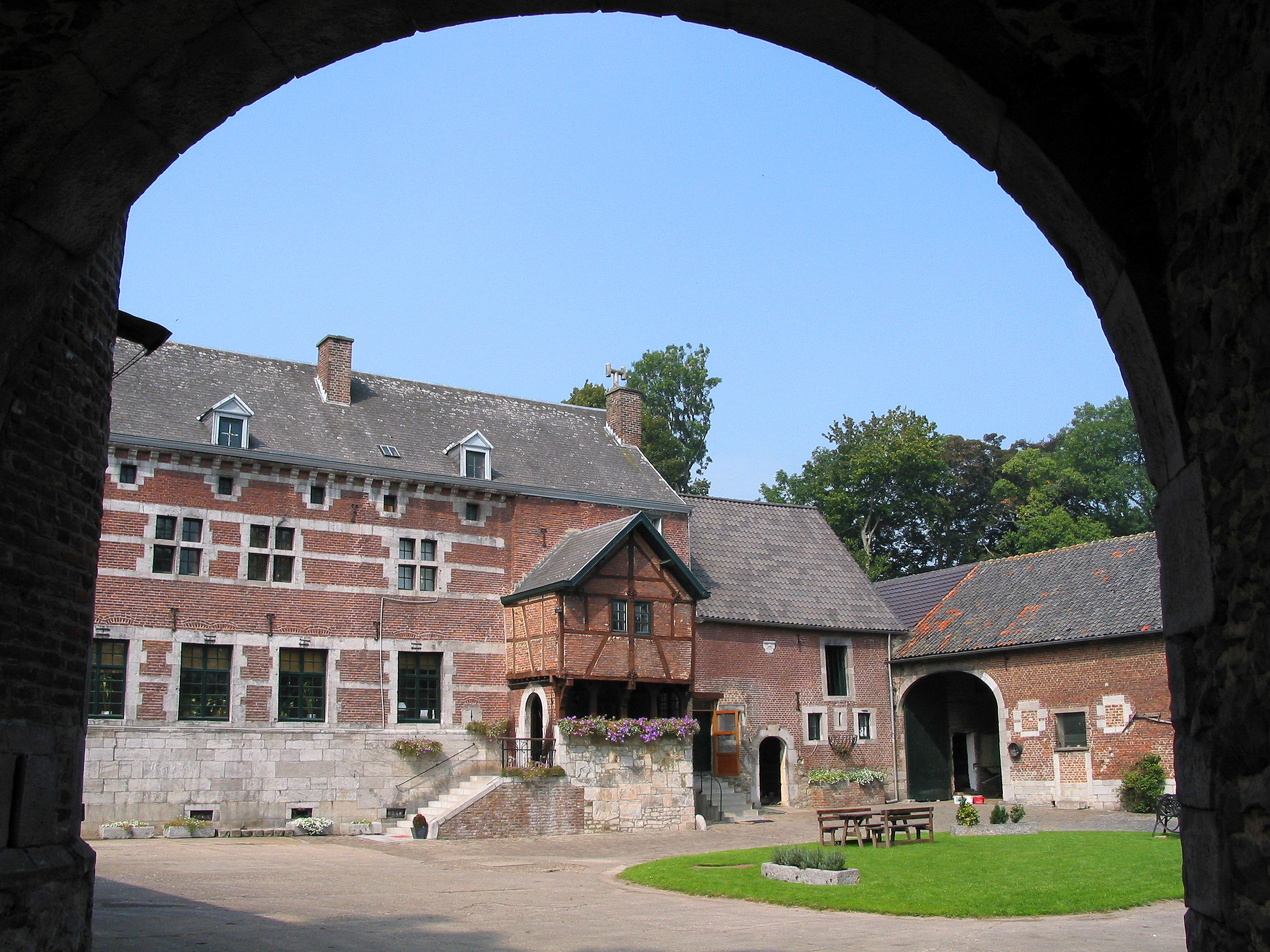
Les Waleffes, the Saint-Pierre farm (1644)

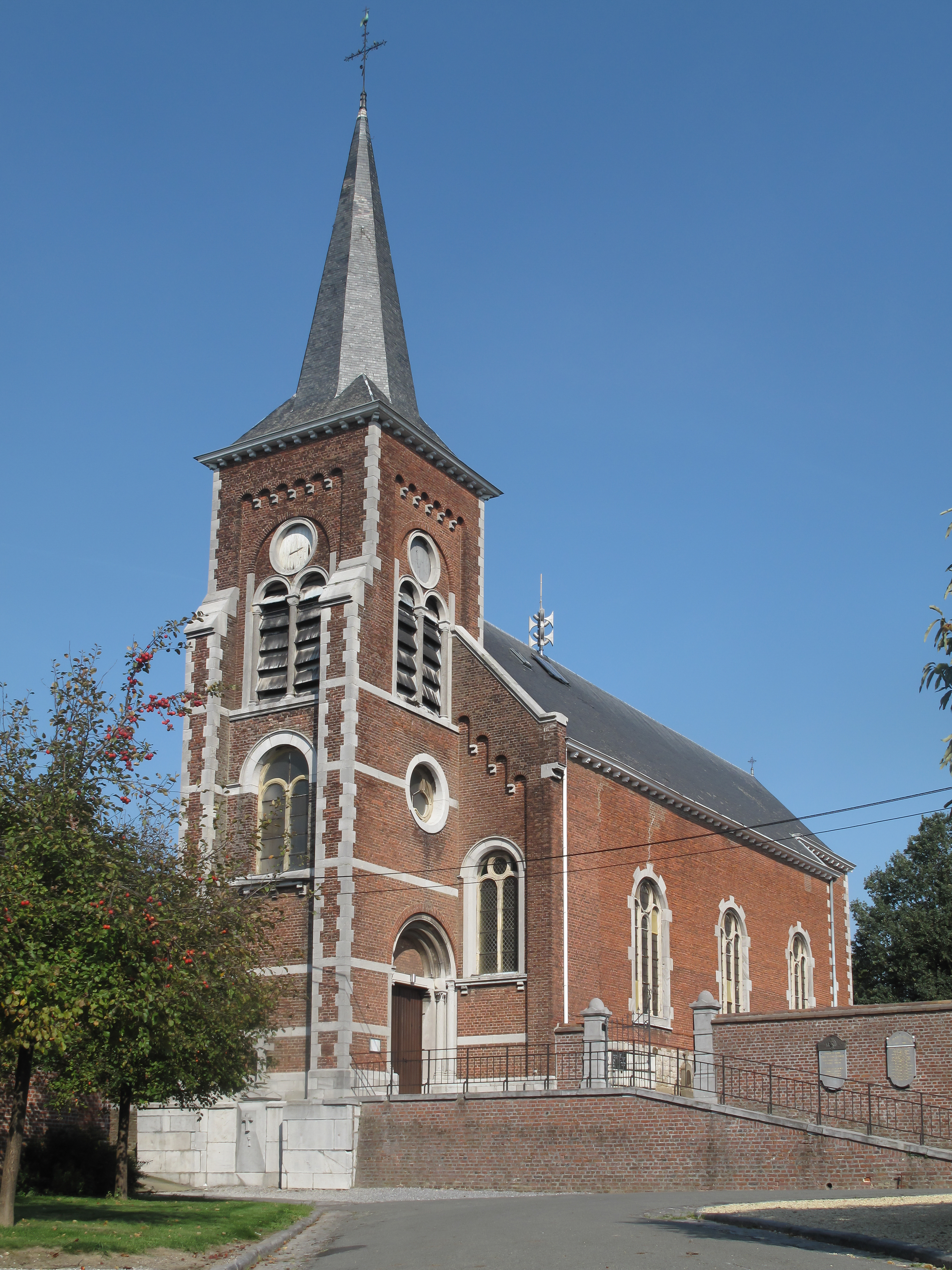
Viemme, church

== See also ==
- List of protected heritage sites in Faimes
