= Vicq, Haute-Marne =

Vicq
- Commune
- Location of Vicq
- Location within France Location within Grand Est
- Coordinates: 47°55′29″N 5°36′06″E
- Country: France
- Region: Grand Est
- Department: Haute-Marne
- Arrondissement: Langres
- Canton: Bourbonne-les-Bains

Government
  - Mayor (2020–2026): Jacky Horiot
- Area^{1}: 13.72 km^{2} (5.30 sq mi)
- Elevation: 278 m (912 ft)
- Population (2023): 161
  - Density: 11.7/km^{2} (30.4/sq mi)
- Time zone: UTC+01:00 (CET)
  - Summer (DST): UTC+02:00 (CEST)
- INSEE/Postal code: 52520 /52400
- ^{1} French Land Register data, which excludes lakes, ponds, glaciers > 1 km^{2} (0.386 sq mi or 247 acres) and river estuaries.

Vicq (French pronunciation: [vik]) is a commune in the Haute-Marne department in north-eastern France.

== See also ==
- Communes of the Haute-Marne department
