= Le Châtelet (mountain) =

Mountain in Switzerland

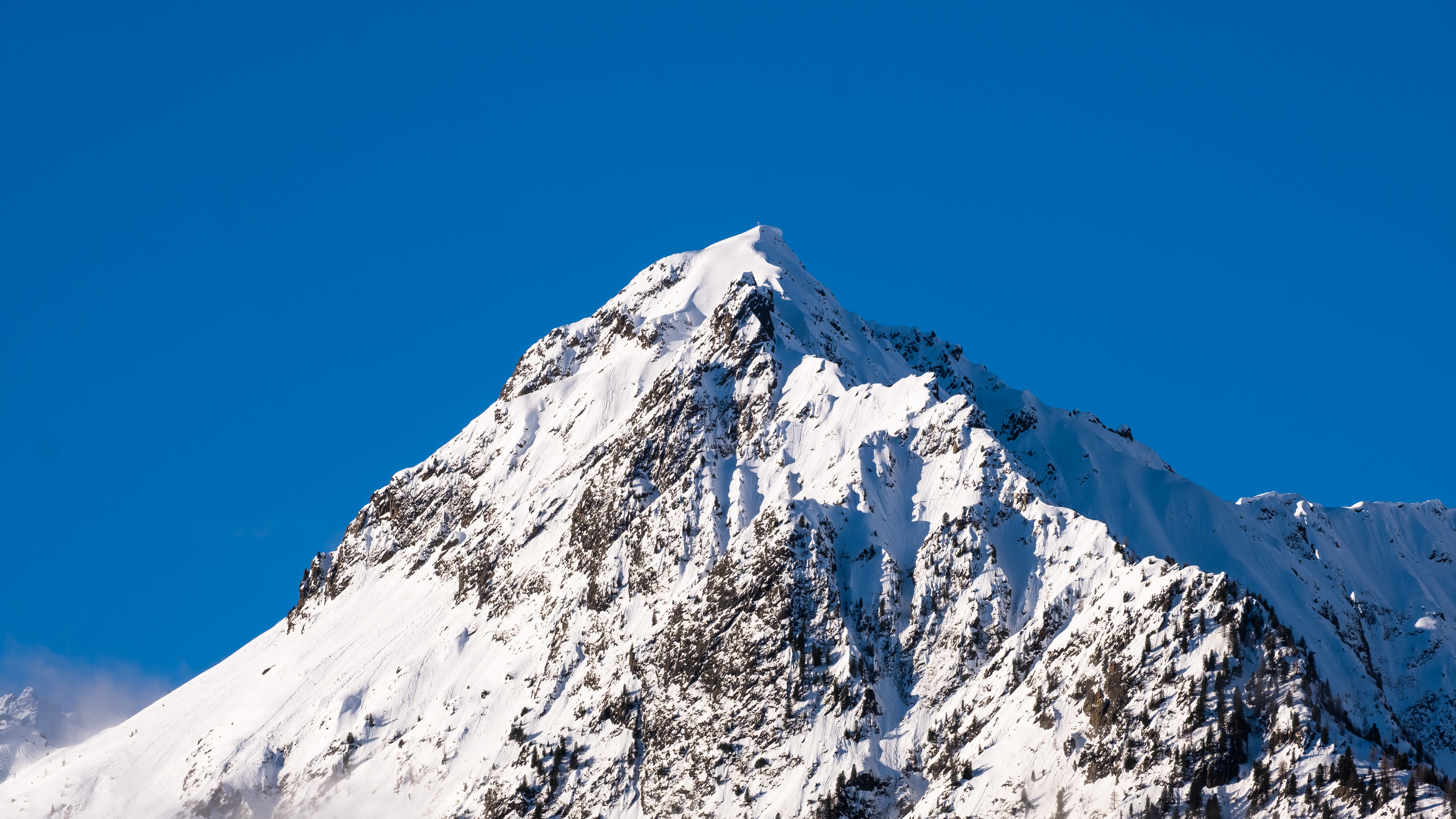
- Le Châtelet as seen from the north-west

Highest point
- Elevation: 2,537 m (8,323 ft)
- Prominence: 96 m (315 ft)
- Parent peak: Mont Blanc
- Coordinates: 45°59′54.7″N 7°05′59.1″E

Geography
- Location within Switzerland
- Location: Valais, Switzerland
- Parent range: Mont Blanc Massif

Le Châtelet (2,537 m) is a mountain of the Swiss Mont Blanc massif, overlooking Orsières in the canton of Valais. It lies between the valleys of Orny and Saleina.
