= Enfonvelle =

- Commune
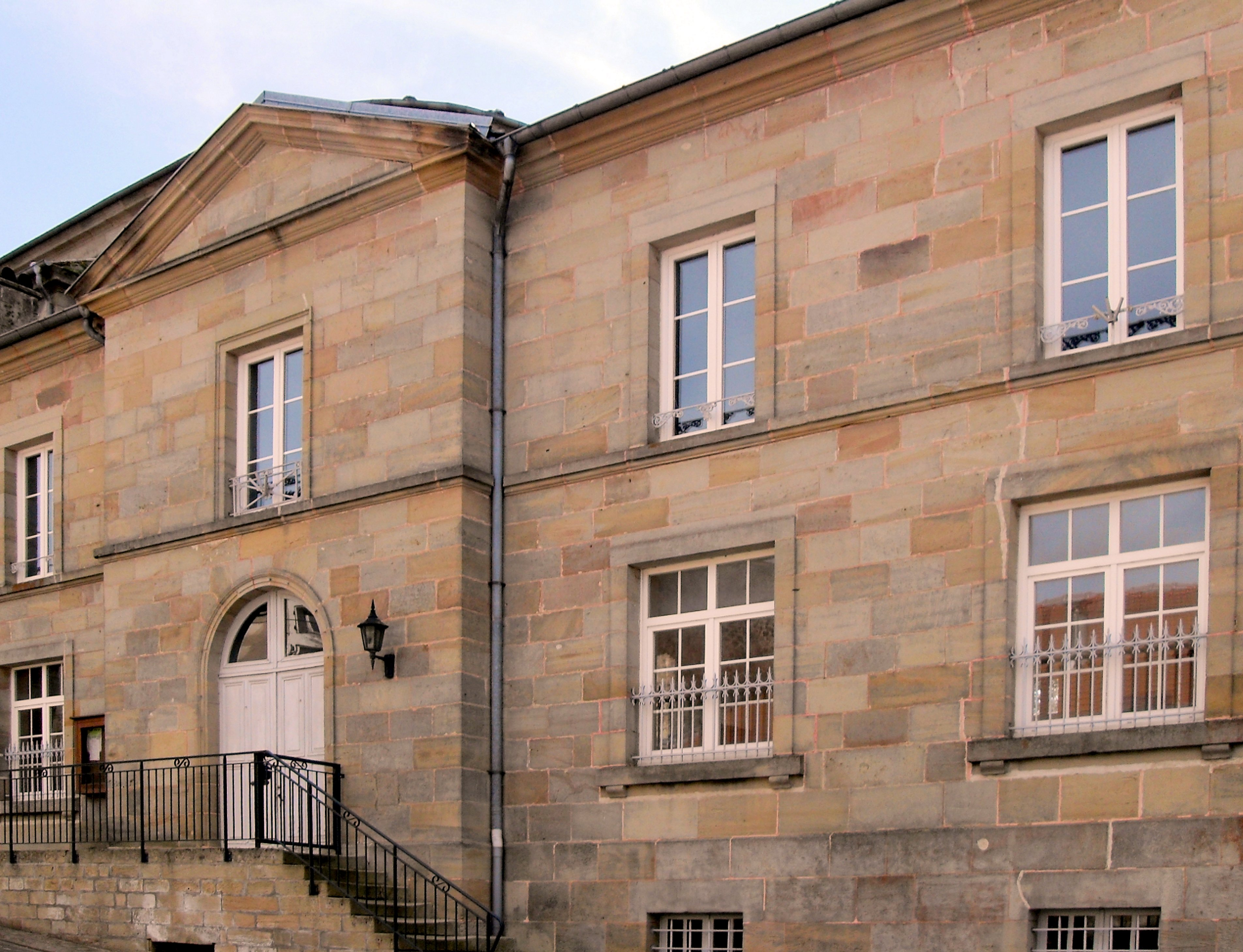
- The town hall in Enfonvelle
- Location of Enfonvelle
- Location within France Location within Grand Est
- Coordinates: 47°55′40″N 5°51′54″E
- Country: France
- Region: Grand Est
- Department: Haute-Marne
- Arrondissement: Langres
- Canton: Bourbonne-les-Bains

Government
  - Mayor (2020–2026): Jean-Claude Henry
- Area^{1}: 12.4 km^{2} (4.8 sq mi)
- Elevation: 310 m (1,020 ft)
- Population (2023): 70
  - Density: 5.6/km^{2} (15/sq mi)
- Time zone: UTC+01:00 (CET)
  - Summer (DST): UTC+02:00 (CEST)
- INSEE/Postal code: 52185 /52400
- ^{1} French Land Register data, which excludes lakes, ponds, glaciers > 1 km^{2} (0.386 sq mi or 247 acres) and river estuaries.

Enfonvelle (French pronunciation: [ɑ̃fɔ̃vɛl]) is a commune in the Haute-Marne department in north-eastern France.

== See also ==
- Communes of the Haute-Marne department
