= Celles, Charente-Maritime =

Celles
- Commune
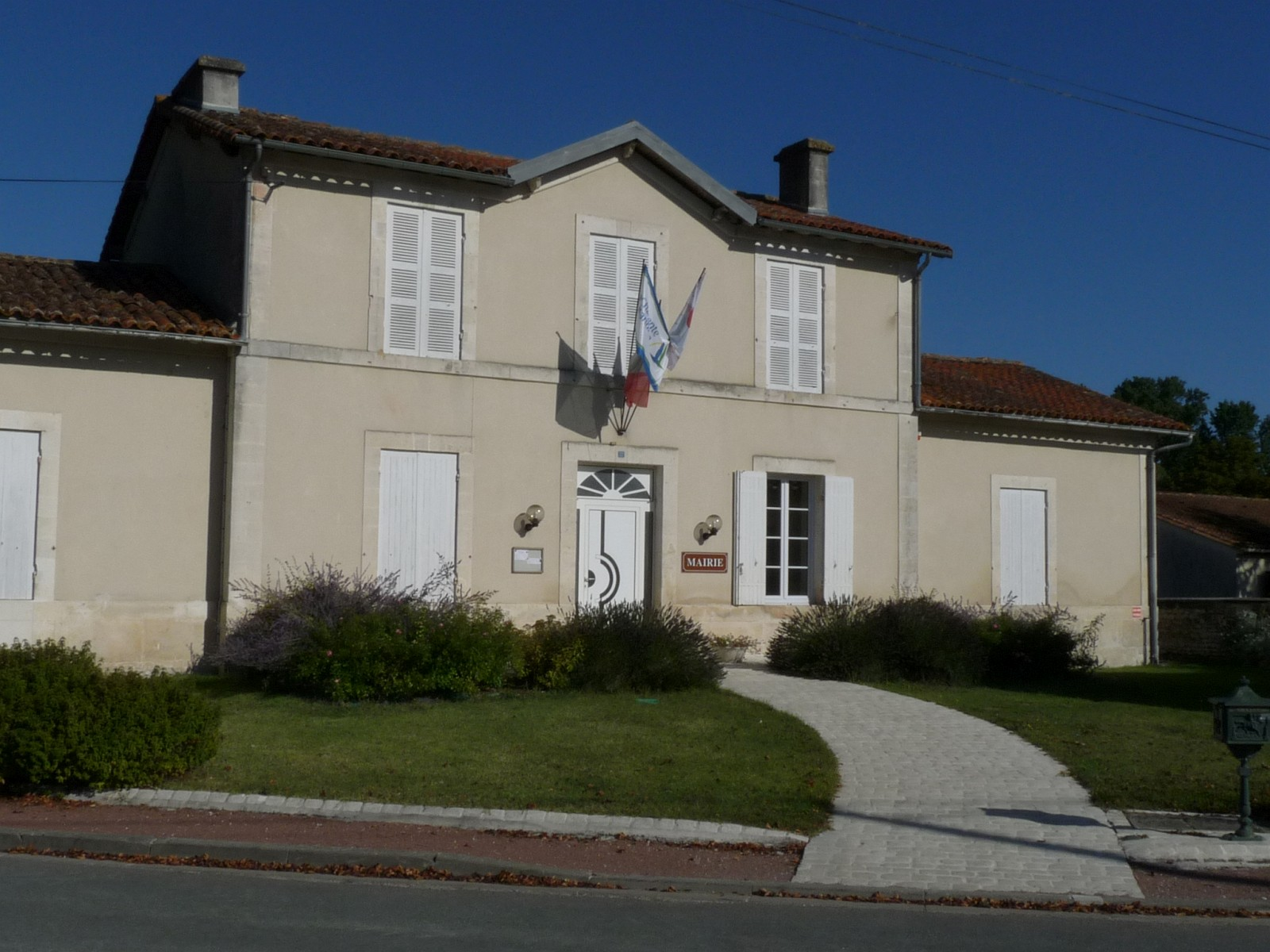
- The town hall in Celles
- Location of Celles
- Location within France Location within Nouvelle-Aquitaine
- Coordinates: 45°36′20″N 0°22′13″W
- Country: France
- Region: Nouvelle-Aquitaine
- Department: Charente-Maritime
- Arrondissement: Jonzac
- Canton: Jonzac

Government
  - Mayor (2020–2026): Pierre-Noël Roy
- Area^{1}: 6 km^{2} (2.3 sq mi)
- Highest elevation: 44 m (144 ft)
- Lowest elevation: 8 m (26 ft)
- Population (2023): 329
  - Density: 55/km^{2} (140/sq mi)
- Time zone: UTC+01:00 (CET)
  - Summer (DST): UTC+02:00 (CEST)
- INSEE/Postal code: 17076 /17520
- ^{1} French Land Register data, which excludes lakes, ponds, glaciers > 1 km^{2} (0.386 sq mi or 247 acres) and river estuaries.

Celles (French pronunciation: [sɛl]) is a commune in the Charente-Maritime department in the Nouvelle-Aquitaine region in southwestern France.

== Population ==
Historical population
| Year | Pop. | ±% p.a. |
|---|---|---|
| 1968 | 325 | — |
| 1975 | 267 | −2.77% |
| 1982 | 256 | −0.60% |
| 1990 | 280 | +1.13% |
| 1999 | 251 | −1.21% |
| 2007 | 289 | +1.78% |
| 2012 | 324 | +2.31% |
| 2017 | 323 | −0.06% |
| 2023 | 329 | +0.31% |
Source: INSEE

== See also ==
- Communes of the Charente-Maritime department
