= Le Châtelet-sur-Meuse =

- Commune
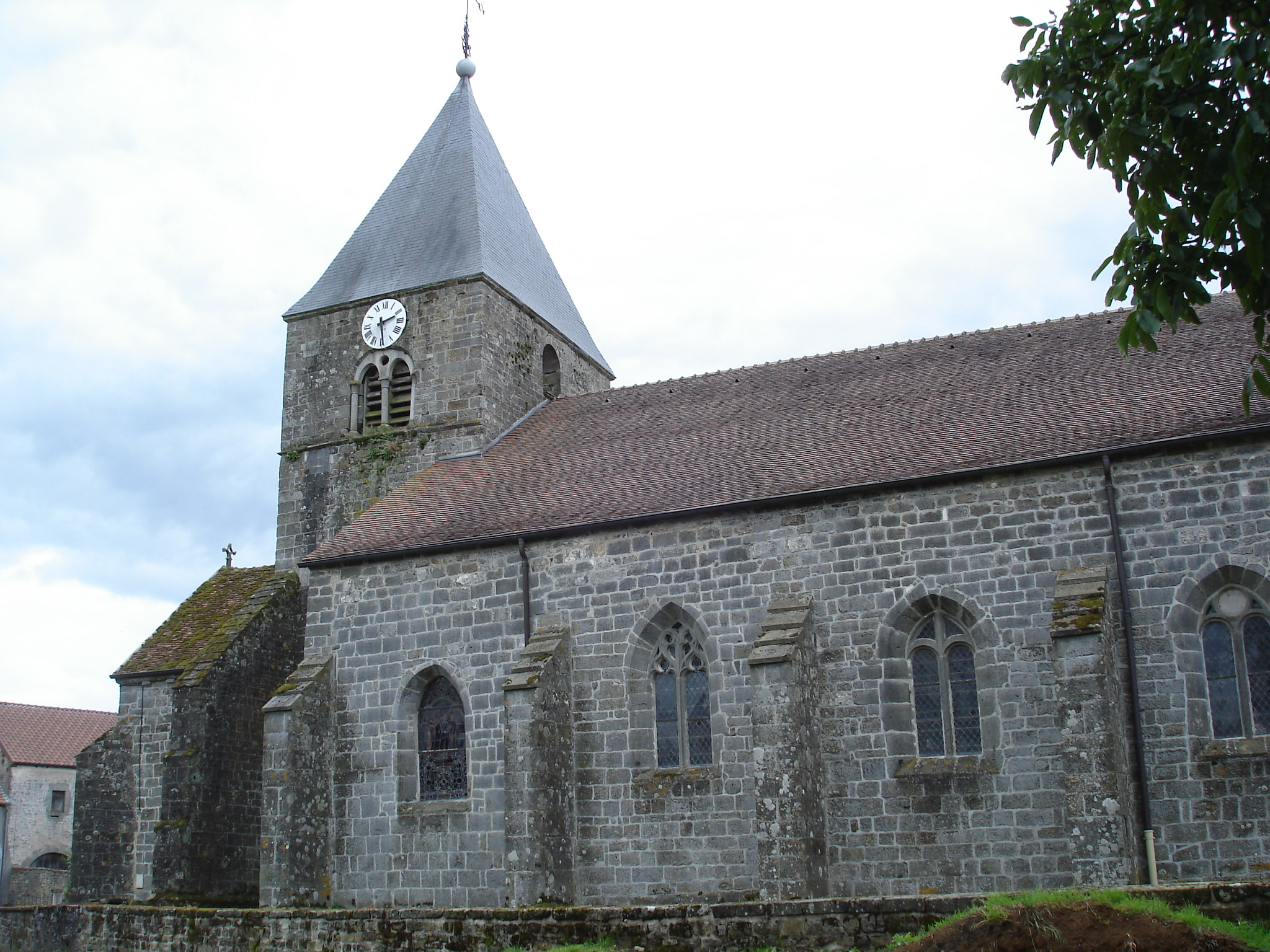
- The church in Pouilly-en-Bassigny
- Location of Le Châtelet-sur-Meuse
- Location within France Location within Grand Est
- Coordinates: 47°58′52″N 5°37′47″E
- Country: France
- Region: Grand Est
- Department: Haute-Marne
- Arrondissement: Langres
- Canton: Bourbonne-les-Bains

Government
  - Mayor (2020–2026): Dominique Daval
- Area^{1}: 21.31 km^{2} (8.23 sq mi)
- Elevation: 409 m (1,342 ft)
- Population (2023): 155
  - Density: 7.27/km^{2} (18.8/sq mi)
- Time zone: UTC+01:00 (CET)
  - Summer (DST): UTC+02:00 (CEST)
- INSEE/Postal code: 52400 /52400
- ^{1} French Land Register data, which excludes lakes, ponds, glaciers > 1 km^{2} (0.386 sq mi or 247 acres) and river estuaries.

Le Châtelet-sur-Meuse (French pronunciation: [lə ʃatlɛ syʁ møz], literally Le Châtelet on Meuse) is a commune in the Haute-Marne department in north-eastern France.

It contains the source of the River Meuse, which is very close to the commune's village of Pouilly-en-Bassigny.

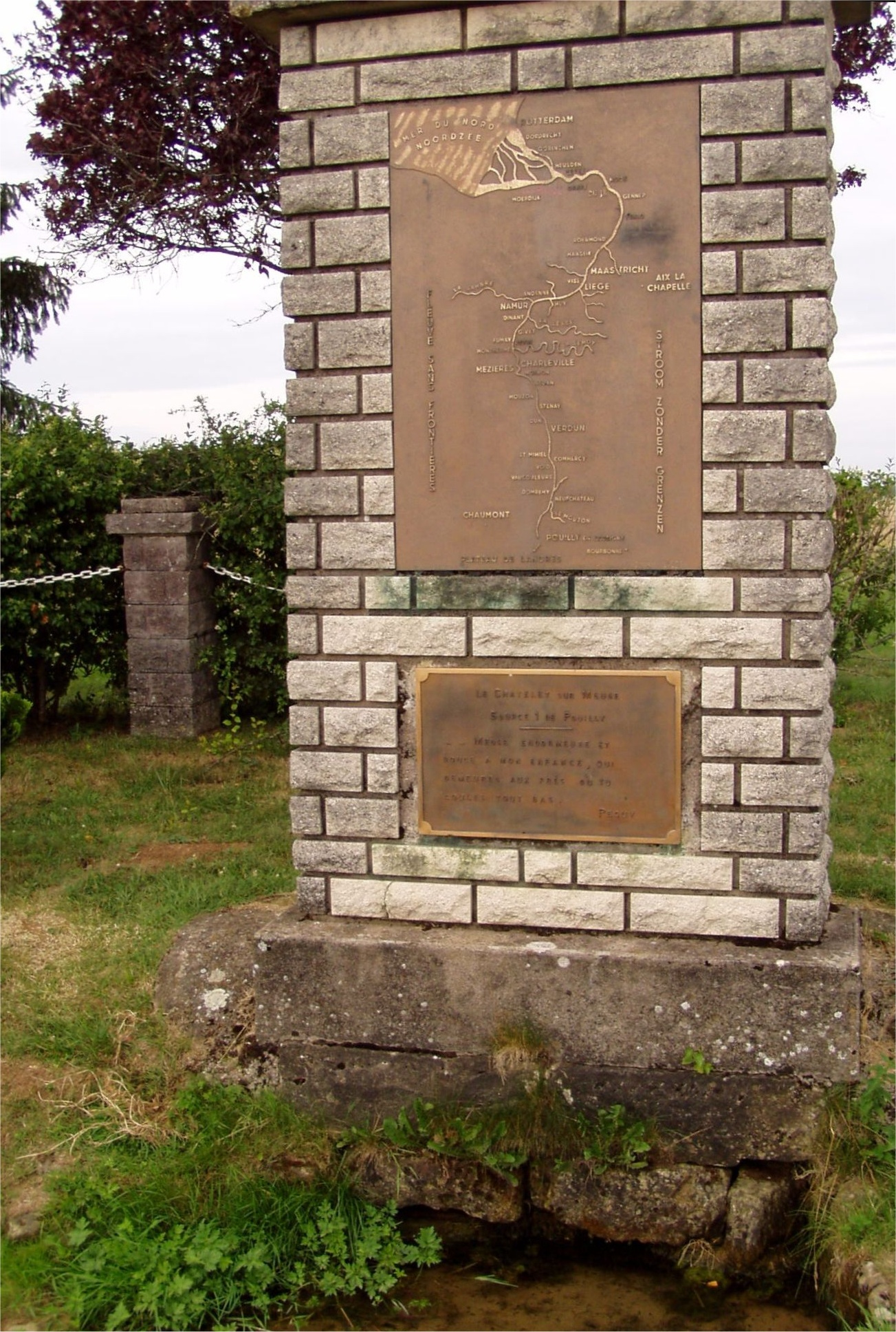

== See also ==
- Communes of the Haute-Marne department
