= Voisey, Haute-Marne =

Voisey
- Commune
- Location of Voisey
- Location within France Location within Grand Est
- Coordinates: 47°53′07″N 5°46′59″E
- Country: France
- Region: Grand Est
- Department: Haute-Marne
- Arrondissement: Langres
- Canton: Bourbonne-les-Bains
- Intercommunality: Savoir-Faire

Government
  - Mayor (2020–2026): Jany Garot
- Area^{1}: 31.6 km^{2} (12.2 sq mi)
- Elevation: 266 m (873 ft)
- Highest elevation: 427 m (1,401 ft)
- Lowest elevation: 222 m (728 ft)
- Population (2023): 272
  - Density: 8.61/km^{2} (22.3/sq mi)
- Time zone: UTC+01:00 (CET)
  - Summer (DST): UTC+02:00 (CEST)
- INSEE/Postal code: 52544 /52400
- ^{1} French Land Register data, which excludes lakes, ponds, glaciers > 1 km^{2} (0.386 sq mi or 247 acres) and river estuaries.

Voisey (French pronunciation: [vwazɛ]) is a commune in the Haute-Marne department in north-eastern France.

== See also ==
- Communes of the Haute-Marne department
