= Serqueux, Haute-Marne =

Serqueux
- Commune
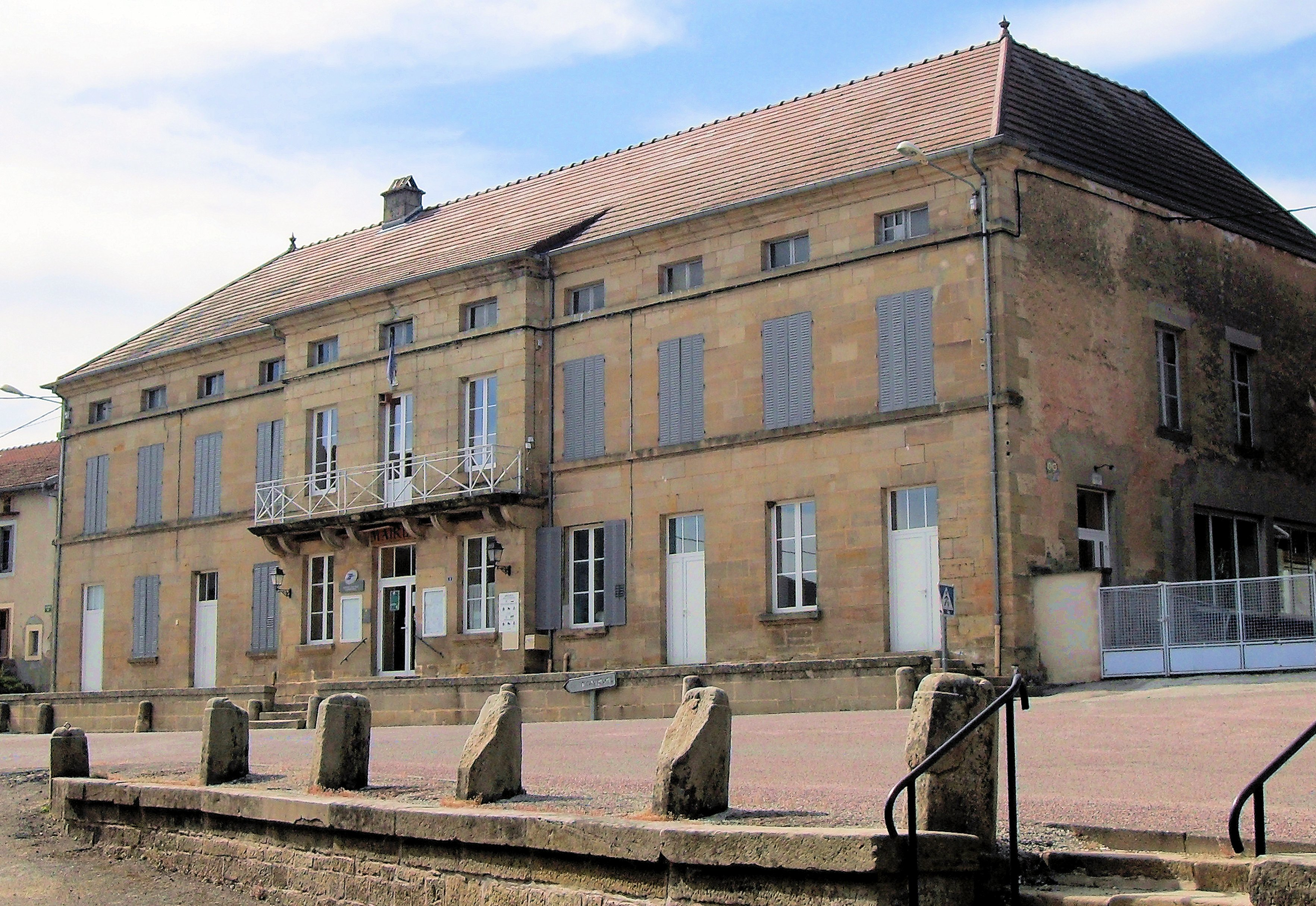
- The town hall in Serqueux

- Coat of arms
- Location of Serqueux
- Location within France Location within Grand Est
- Coordinates: 47°59′30″N 5°44′16″E
- Country: France
- Region: Grand Est
- Department: Haute-Marne
- Arrondissement: Langres
- Canton: Bourbonne-les-Bains
- Intercommunality: Savoir-Faire

Government
  - Mayor (2020–2026): Christelle Claude
- Area^{1}: 25.63 km^{2} (9.90 sq mi)
- Highest elevation: 485 m (1,591 ft)
- Lowest elevation: 269 m (883 ft)
- Population (2023): 377
  - Density: 14.7/km^{2} (38.1/sq mi)
- Demonym: Sarcophagiens
- Time zone: UTC+01:00 (CET)
  - Summer (DST): UTC+02:00 (CEST)
- INSEE/Postal code: 52470 /52400
- Website: serqueux52.fr
- ^{1} French Land Register data, which excludes lakes, ponds, glaciers > 1 km^{2} (0.386 sq mi or 247 acres) and river estuaries.

Serqueux (French pronunciation: [sɛʁkø]) is a commune in the Haute-Marne department in north-eastern France.

== See also ==
- Communes of the Haute-Marne department
