= Diocese of Langres =

Catholic diocese in France

Coordinates: 47.8598°N 5.33469°E

Diocese of Langres Dioecesis Lingonensis Diocèse de Langres

Catholic
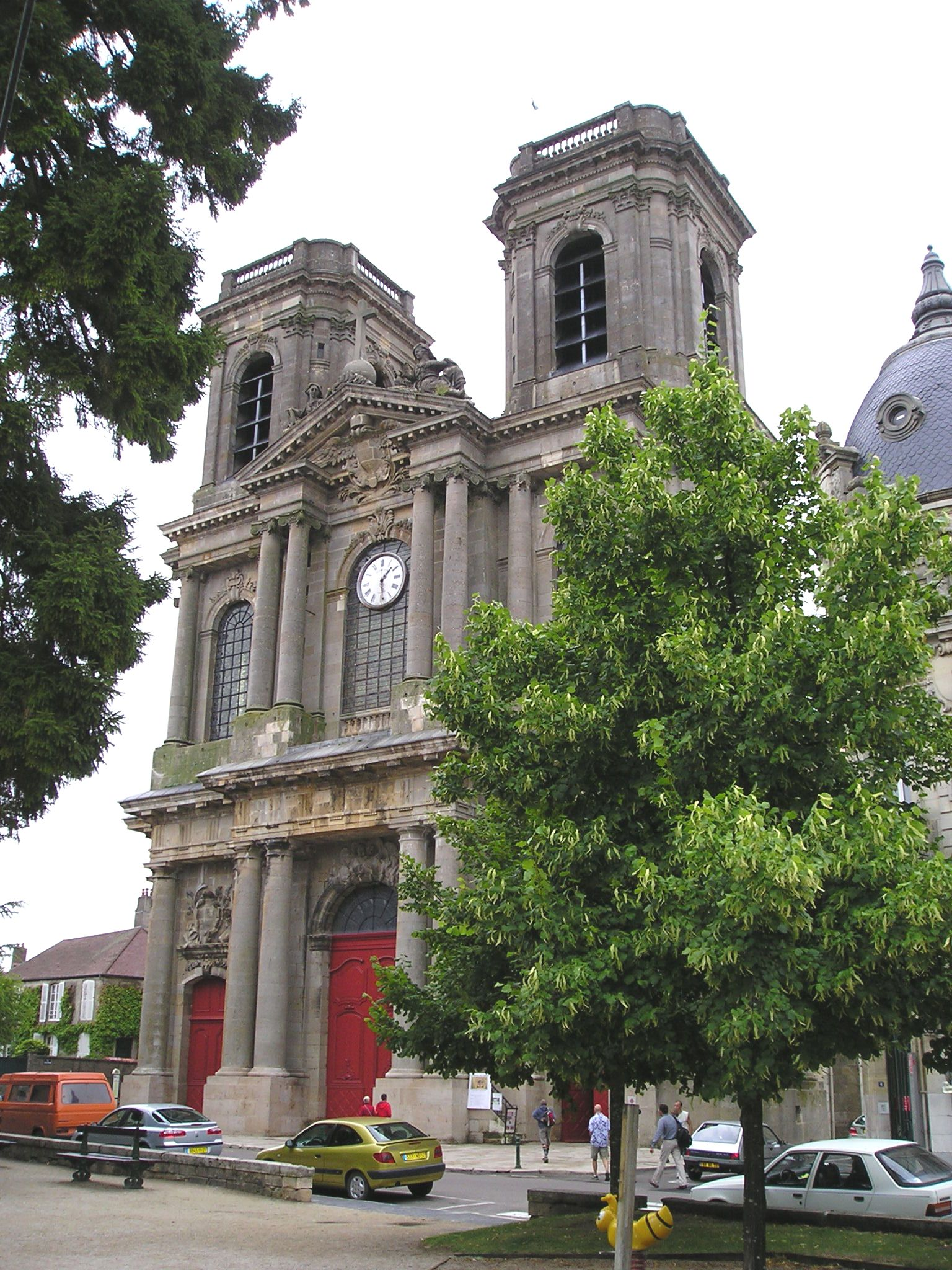
- Langres Cathedral

Location
- Country: France
- Metropolitan: Archdiocese of Reims
- Headquarters: Chaumont, Haute-Marne, France

Statistics
- Area: 6,210 km^{2} (2,400 sq mi)
- Population: Total; Catholics: (as of 2023); 173,900; 130,640 (75.1%)
- Parishes: 31

Information
- Denomination: Catholic
- Sui iuris church: Latin Church
- Rite: Roman Rite
- Established: 3rd Century
- Cathedral: Cathedral of St. Mammes in Langres
- Patron saint: St. Mammes of Caesarea
- Secular priests: 28 (Diocesan); 6 (Religious Orders); 18 Permanent Deacons

Current leadership
- Pope: Leo XIV
- Bishop: Sede vacante
- Metropolitan Archbishop: Éric de Moulins-Beaufort
- Bishops emeritus: Philippe Gueneley

Map

Website
- 52.catholique.fr

The Diocese of Langres (Latin: Dioecesis Lingonensis; French: Diocèse de Langres) is a Latin Church diocese of the Catholic Church comprising the département of Haute-Marne in France.

The diocese is now a suffragan in ecclesiastical province of the Archdiocese of Reims, having been a suffragan of Lyon until 2002. The current bishop is Joseph Marie Edouard de Metz-Noblat, who succeeded Bishop Philippe Jean Marie Joseph Gueneley on 21 January 2014. The diocese covers a territory of 6,250 km^{2} and its estimated catholic population is 128,000.

In 2021, in the Diocese of Langres there was one priest for every 2,782 Catholics.

== History ==
Louis Duchesne considers Senator, Justus and Didier de Langres, who was martyred during the invasion of the Vandals (about 407), the first three bishops of Langres. The See, therefore, must have been founded about the middle of the fourth century.

In 1179, Hugh III, Duke of Burgundy gave the city of Langres to his uncle, Gautier of Burgundy, then bishop, making him a prince-bishop. Later, Langres was made a duchy, which gave the Duke-Bishop of Langres the right of secular precedence over his Metropolitan, the Archbishop of Lyon, at the consecration of the kings of France.

The chief patron saint of the diocese is the martyr Mammes of Caesarea (third century), to whom the cathedral, a monument of the late twelfth century, is dedicated. The diocese of Langres honors as saints some martyrs who, according to legend, died in the persecution of Roman Emperor Marcus Aurelius. They are the triplets Speusippus, Eleusippus, and Melapsippus; Neo, the author of their Acts; Leonilla, their grandmother; and Junilla, their mother. Other saints honored there include:

- Valerius (Valier), a disciple of Desiderius, who was martyred by the Vandals in the fifth century
- the hermit Godo (or Gou), nephew of Vandrillus in the seventh century
- Gengulphus, martyr in the eighth century
- Gerard Voinchet (1640–95), canon regular of the Congregation of St. Geneviève in Paris
- Jeanne Mance (1606–73)
- Mariet, a priest who died in 1704
- Joseph Urban Hanipaux, a Jesuit.

The latter three were natives of the diocese and celebrated for their apostolic labors in Canada.

The diocese was also the birthplace of the theologian Nicolas de Clémenges (fourteenth or fifteenth century), who was canon and treasurer of the Church of Langres; of the Gallican canonist Edmond Richer (1560–1631); of the Jesuit Pierre Lemoine, author of an epic poem on St. Louis and of the work La dévotion aisée (1602–71); and of the philosopher Diderot (1713–84). The historian Raoul Glaber, monk of Cluny Abbey who died in 1050, was at the priory of St. Léger in this diocese when he experienced an apparition.

The Benedictine Poulangy Abbey was founded in the eleventh century. Morimond Abbey, the fourth foundation of Cîteaux, was established in 1125 by Odolric, lord of Aigremont, and Simon, Count of Bassigny. The Augustinian priory of the Val des Écoliers was founded in 1212 at Luzy, near Chaumont, by four doctors of the Paris University who were led into solitude by a love of retreat.

Otho, son of Leopold of Austria and Abbot of Morimond, became Bishop of Freising in Bavaria and returned in 1154 to die a simple monk in Morimond.

The "Scourging of the Alleluia," now no longer observed, was quite celebrated in this diocese in the Middle Ages. On the day when, according to tradition, the Alleluia was omitted from the liturgy, a top on which the word "Alleluia" was written was whipped out of the church, to the singing of psalms by the choirboys, who wished it bon voyage till Easter.

The "Pardon of Chaumont" is very celebrated. In 1475, Jean de Montmirail, a native of Chaumont and a particular friend of Pope Sixtus IV, obtained from him that each time the feast of St. John the Baptist fell on a Sunday, the faithful, who confessed their sins and visited the church of Chaumont, should enjoy the jubilee indulgence. Such was the origin of the great "Pardon" of Chaumont, celebrated sixty-one times between 1476 and 1905. At the end of the Middle Ages, this "Pardon" gave rise to certain festivities. Fifteen mysteries of the life of St. John the Baptist were represented on stages erected throughout the town on the Sunday preceding the "Pardon." The display drew multitudes to the festivities, which were finally called the "deviltries" of Chaumont. In the eighteenth century, the "Pardon" became a purely religious ceremony.

In the Diocese of Langres is Vassy, where, in 1562, riots took place between Catholics and Protestants that gave rise to the wars of religion (see Huguenots).

Numerous diocesan synods were held at Langres. The most important were those of 1404, 1421, 1621, 1628, 1679, 1725, 1733, 1741, 1783 and six successive annual synods held by Pierre Louis Parisis, from 1841 to 1846. These held a view to the re-establishment of the synodal organization, and also to impose on the clergy the use of the Roman Breviary (see Prosper Guéranger).

Principal pilgrimages are Our Lady of Montrol near Arc-en-Barrois (dating from the seventeenth century); Our Lady of the Hermits at Cuves; Our Lady of Victories at Bourmont; and St. Joseph, Protector of the Souls in Purgatory, at Maranville.

Suppressed by the Napoleonic Concordat of 1801, Langres was later united to the Diocese of Dijon. The bishop bore the title of Dijon and Langres, but the union was never quite complete. There was a pro-vicar-general for the Haute-Marne and two seminaries at Langres, the petit séminaire from 1809 and the grand séminaire from 1817. The See of Langres was re-established in 1817 by Pope Pius VII and King Louis XVIII. César Guillaume de La Luzerne, its pre-Revolution bishop, was to be re-appointed, but the parliament did not ratify this agreement and the bishops of Dijon remained administrators of the Diocese of Langres until 6 October 1822, when the Papal Bull "Paternae charitatis" definitely re-established the See. The new Bishop of Langres governed 360 parishes of the old Diocese of Langres, 70 of the old Diocese of Châlons, 13 of the old Diocese of Besançon, 13 of the old Diocese of Troyes and 94 of the old Diocese of Toul. For the legends concerning the Apostolic origin of the See of Langres and the mission of St. Benignus see Dijon.

== Bishops ==
The bishops, until 1016, resided at Dijon and until 1731, exercised spiritual jurisdiction over the territory of the present-day Diocese of Dijon. Following is a list of bishops of Langres.

=== To 1000 ===
- c. 200 Senator
- c. 240 Justus
- c. 264 Desiderius (Didier, Dizier)
- Vacant
- 284–301 Martin
- 301–327 Honoratius
- 327–375 Urban of Langres
- 375–422 Paulinus I
- St. Martin (411–420)?
- 422–448 Fraterne I
- 448–455 Fraterne II
- 456–484 Aprunculus, St. Aprunculus, the friend of St Sidonius Apollinaris and his successor as Bishop of Clermont
- 485–490 Armentaire
- 490–493 Venantius
- 493–498 Paulinus II (Paul)
- 498–501 Patiens
- 501–506 Albiso
- 506–539 Gregory of Langres, St. Gregory (509–539), great-grandfather of St. Gregory of Tours, who transferred the relics of St. Benignus
- 539–572 Tetricus of Langres, St. Tetricus, son of St. Gregory (539–572), whose coadjutor was St. Monderic, brother of Arnoul of Metz
- 572–583 Papoul
- 583–595 Mummole le Bon
- 595–618 Miget (Migetius)
- 618–628 Modoald
- 628–650 Berthoald
- 650–660 Sigoald
- 660–670 Wulfrand
- 670–680 Godin
- 680–682 Adoin
- 682–690 Garibald
- 690–713 Héron
- 713–742 Eustorge
- Died c. 759 Vaudier
- 752–772 Erlolf
- 772–778 Herulphe, Herulphus or Ariolf (759–774), founder of Ellwangen Abbey
- 778–790 Baldric
- 790–820 Belto, Betto (790–820), who helped to draw up the capitularies of Charlemagne
- 820–838 Albéric
- 838–856 Thibaut I
- 859–880 Isaac the Good, author of a collection of canons
- 880–888 Gilon de Tournus
- 888–890 Argrin, first time
- 890–894 Thibaut II
- 894–910 Argrin, second time
- 910–922 Garnier I
- 922–931 Gotzelin
- 932 Lethéric
- 932–948 Héric or Héry
- 948–969 Achard
- 969–980 Vidric
- 980–1015 Bruno of Roucy who brought in the monks of Cluny to reform the abbeys of the diocese

=== 1000–1300 ===
- 1016–1031 Lambert I, who ceded to Robert II of France the lordship and countship of Dijon, in 1016
- 1031 Richard
- 1031–1049 Hugo de Breteuil
- 1050–1065 Harduin
- 1065–1085 Raynard of Bar
- 1085–1111 Robert of Burgundy
- 1111–1113 Lambert II
- 1113–1125 Joceran de Brancion
- 1126–1136 Guillenc
- 1136–1138 Guillaume I de Sabran
- 1138–1163 Godefroy de la Roche Vanneau
- 1163–1179 Walter of Burgundy, Gauthier of Burgundy
- 1179–1193 Manasses of Bar
- 1193–1199 Garnier II de Rochefort
- 1200–1205 Hutin de Vandeuvre
- 1205–1210 Robert de Châtillon
- 1210–1220 Guillaume de Joinville († 1226) (Archbishop of Reims)
- 1220–1236 Hugues de Montréal
- 1236–1242 Robert de Torote († 1246), Prince-Bishop of Liège in 1240, and established the feast of the Blessed Sacrament, Elect of Châlon 1226
- 1242–1250 Hugues de Rochecorbon
- 1250–1266 Guy de Rochefort
- 1266–1291 Guy de Genève
- 1294–1305 Jean de Rochefort

=== 1300–1500 ===
- 1305–1306 Bertrand de Got († 1313) (also Bishop of Agen), uncle of Clement V
- 1306–1318 Guillaume de Durfort de Duras († 1330) (Archbishop of Rouen)
- 1318–1324 Louis of Poitiers-Valentinois († 1327) (also Bishop of Viviers and Bishop of Metz)
- 1324–1329 Pierre de Rochefort
- 1329–1335 Jean de Chalon-Arlay (also Bishop of Basel)
- 1335–1338 Guy Baudet (Chancellor of France)
- 1338–1342 Jean des Prez († 1349) (Bishop of Tournai)
- 1342–1344 Jean d'Arcy (Bishop of Autun)
- 1344–1345 Hugues de Pomarc
- 1345–1374 William of Poitiers
- 1374–1395 Bernard de la Tour
- 1395–1413 Louis I of Bar (Administrator from 1397; also Bishop of Poitiers 1391–1392, 1423–1424, Bishop of Beauvais 1395, 1397 Cardinal Deacon of S. Agatha dei Goti, 1409 Cardinal Priest of SS. Dodici Apostoli, 1412 Cardinal Bishop of Porto and S. Rufina and Administrator of the Bishopric of Verdun 1413–1420, 1424–1430)
- 1413–1433 Charles de Poitiers
- 1433 Jean Gobillon († c. 1435)
- 1433–1452 Philippe de Vienne
- 1452–1453 Jean d'Aussy
- 1453–1481 Guy Bernard
- 1481–1497 Jean I d'Amboise
- 1497–1512 Jean II d'Amboise

=== 1500–1700 ===
- 1512–1529 Michel Boudet
- 1530–1561 Claude de Longwy
- 1562–1565 Louis de Bourbon
- 1566–1568 Pierre de Gondi (also Bishop of Paris 1573–1588, Abbot of Saint-Aubin-d'Angers, La Chaume, Sainte-Croix de Quimperlé and Buzay)
- 1569–1614 Charles de Perusse des Cars
- 1615–1655 Sébastien Zamet, whose vicar-general, Charles de Condren, became later Superior General of the Oratorians and gave the college of Langres to the Society of Jesus in 1630
- 1655–1670 Louis Barbier de La Rivière
- 1671–1695 Louis Armand de Simiane de Gordes
- 1696–1724 François-Louis de Clermont-Tonnerre

=== 1700–1900 ===
- 1724–1733 Pierre de Pardaillan de Gondrin
- 1741–1770 Gilbert Gaspard de Montmorin de Saint-Hérem
- 1770–1802 César-Guillaume de La Luzerne
- 1791–1802 Hubert Wandilincourt
- vacancy
- 1817–1821 César-Guillaume de La Luzerne
- Gilbert-Paul Aragonès d'Orcet (1823–1832)
- Jacques-Marie-Adrien-Césaire Mathieu (1832–1834) (Archbishop of Besançon)
- Pierre-Louis Parisis (1834–1851) (Bishop of Arras), celebrated for the part he took in the Assembly of 1848 in the discussions on the liberty of teaching (liberté d'enseignement) and for founding the ecclesiastical college of St. Dizier even before the Loi Falloux (see Falloux du Coudray) was definitely passed
- Jean-Jacques-Marie-Antoine Guerrin (1851–1877)
- Guillaume-Marie-Frédéric Bouange (1877–1884)
- Alphonse-Martin Larue (1884–1899)
- Sébastien Herscher (1899–1911)

=== From 1900 ===
- Marie-Augustin-Olivier de Durfort de Civbac de Lorge (1911–1918) (also Bishop of Poitiers)
- Théophile-Marie Louvard (1919–1924) (Bishop of Coutances)
- Jean-Baptiste Thomas (1925–1929)
- Louis-Joseph Fillon (1929–1934) (Archbishop of Bourges)
- Georges-Eugène-Emile Choquet (1935–1938) (Bishop of Tarbes and Lourdes)
- Firmin Lamy (1938–1939)
- Louis Chiron (1939–1964)
- Alfred-Joseph Atton (1964–1975)
- Lucien Daloz (1975–1980) (Archbishop of Besançon)
- Léon Aimé Taverdet, F.M.C. (1981–1999)
- Philippe Jean Marie Joseph Gueneley (1999–2014)
- Joseph de Metz-Noblat (2014–2026)

== See also ==
- Catholic Church in France

== Sources and external links ==
- (in French) Centre national des Archives de l'Église de France, L'Épiscopat francais depuis 1919, retrieved: 2016-12-24.
