= Lambert of Vignory =

Lambert of Vignory, or Lambert II, was the bishop elect of Langres between the death of Bishop Robert in 1111 and the election of Joceran de Brancion in 1113. He is probably to be identified with the archdeacon of the same name who served Langres Cathedral in the same period. He was probably the son of Guy II, lord of Vignory, and Hildegarde. An earlier bishop, Lambert I, is sometimes (erroneously) called "Lambert of Vignory" also.

Lambert's episcopate is known from one charter of 1111, wherein Count William II of Nevers donated the proprietary church of Saint-Aignan de Tonnerre, which had been passed down in his family, to the abbey of Molême. He proclaimed he did this for the benefit of the souls of himself, his father, Count Reginald II of Nevers, his mother, Agnes, his uncle, Count William I, and his other uncle, the late bishop, Robert. He dated his charter to the time when "the lord Lambert was elected in the diocese of Langres".

== Sources ==
- Bouchard, Constance Brittain (1987). Sword, Miter, and Cloister: Nobility and the Church in Burgundy, 980–1198. Cornell University Press.
- Daguin, Arthur (1880–84). Les Évêques de Langres: Étude épigraphique, sigillographique et héraldique. Nogent.
