= Theutbald II (bishop of Langres) =

Theutbald II (or Theobald or Theobold, French: Thibaut, Thibaud, Latin: T(h)eutbaldus; died 894/5) was one of the rival bishops of Langres following the disputed election of 888. According to Flodoard of Reims, he was a relative of Charles the Simple, king of West Francia.

== Biography ==
The death of bishop Geilo of Langres on 28 June 888 came shortly after the death of the Emperor Charles III. The resulting election of the bishop's successor thus took place while the thrones of the various kingdoms of the empire were themselves in dispute. Following his canonical and popular election, Argrim was consecrated bishop by archbishop Aurelian of Lyon, but archbishop Fulk of Reims, who supported the claim of Charles the Simple to the throne, tried to force Theutbald on the church of Langres instead. He convinced Pope Stephen V to back him, and the pope wrote two letters to Aurelian to pressure him to consecrate Theutbald and withdraw his support from Argrim. It took two years and three months for Theutbald's party to gain the upper hand and remove Argrim from Langres. In the autumn of 890, at Pope Stephen's instruction, Theutbald was brought to Langres by Fulk and consecrated bishop.

In 894 Theutbald sent a delegation to the council of Chalon-sur-Saône. Late in 894, his enemies, led by Duke Richard of Burgundy, attacked him and gouged out his eyes. As a result, the temporalities which the bishops had possessed in and around the city of Langres since the time of the Emperor Louis the Pious passed to the duke of Burgundy, since the king of West Francia at the time, Odo, was too weak to intervene and had in 889 favoured Argrim. He died as a result of the procedure, and Argrim was restored.

== Sources ==
- Bouchard, Constance Brittain, ed. (1991). The Cartulary of Flavigny, 717–1113. Cambridge, MA: Medieval Academy of America.
- Dunbabin, Jean (2000). France in the Making, 843–1180. Oxford: Oxford University Press.
- Duchesne, Louis, ed. (1910). Fastes épiscopaux de l'ancienne Gaule, II: L'Aquitaine et les Lyonnaises (2nd ed.). Paris: A. Fontemoing.

Catholic Church titles
Preceded by Geilo	Bishop of Langres (888) 890–894	Succeeded by Argrim
