= Pierre Louis Parisis =

- Bishop of Arras
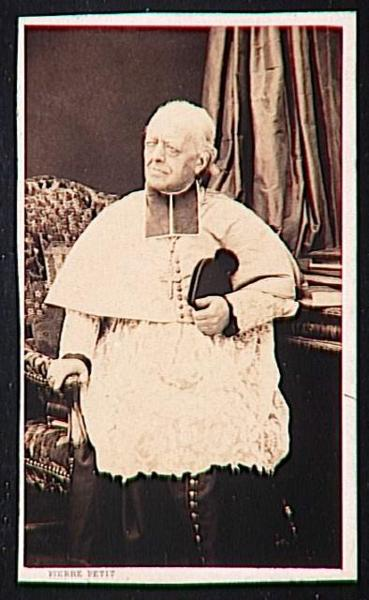
- Church: Catholic Church
- Diocese: Diocese of Arras
- In office: 5 September 1851 – 5 March 1866
- Predecessor: Hugues de La Tour d'Auvergne-Lauraguais
- Successor: Jean-Baptiste Joseph Lequette
- Previous post: Bishop of Langres (1834-1851)

Orders
- Ordination: 18 September 1819
- Consecration: 8 February 1835 by Hyacinthe-Louis de Quélen

Personal details
- Born: 12 August 1795 Orléans, Loiret, French Republic
- Died: 5 March 1866 (aged 70) Arras, Pas-de-Calais, French Empire

Pierre Louis Parisis (12 August 1795 – 5 March 1866) was the Roman Catholic bishop of the Bishopric of Langres in Haute-Marne, France, from 1835 to 1851. In 1851, he succeeded Hugues de La Tour d'Auvergne-Lauragais as Bishop of Arras.

== Biography ==
Parisis was born in 1795 in Orléans, the son of a baker. In 1819 he was ordained a priest for the diocese of Orléans.

=== Bishop of Langres ===
In 1834 he was appointed to succeed Jacques-Marie-Adrien-Césaire Mathieu as Bishop of Langres, and consecrated on 8 February 1835.

As bishop, Parisis issued pastoral instructions on the liturgy. In 1847 he founded the "Archconfraternity of Reparation for blasphemy and the neglect of Sunday" in the Church of St. Martin de La Noue at Saint-Dizier.

A well-known Catholic speaker and author, he was deputy for Morbihan from 1848 to 1851. He is noted for his discussions in the Assembly of 1848 concerning educational reform and for establishing the ecclesiastical College of St. Dizier. He was a member of the commission which prepared the draft for the Falloux Laws.

=== Bishop of Arras ===
In 1851 he was consecrated as Bishop of Arras, which included the former dioceses of Boulogne and St. Omer.

Parisis was the founder and editor of the Revue des sciences ecclesiastioues, and the author of some apologetical works.

Parisis died in Arras on 5 March 1866.
