= Domingos da Cunha =

Portuguese painter

Domingos da Cunha (c. 1598 – 11 May 1644), was a Portuguese painter.

Da Cunha, also known as the "Cabrinha" (due to being a mulatto), studied painting in Madrid with Eugenio Caxés. He primarily painted religious-themed works. He painted The Life of St. Ignatius of Loyola for the New Cathedral of Coimbra, and Visitation for Igreja de São Mamede. In March 1632 he became a lay brother Jesuit. By order of his superiors he wrote an autobiography titled Life of Brother Domingos Cunha.
