= Theutbald I (bishop of Langres) =

Theutbald I (or Theobald, French: Thibaut, Thibaud, Latin: Theutbaldus; died 16 August 856) was the bishop of Langres from when he was elected to succeed Alberic (died 838) until his death. He is first securely attested as bishop in 842. He may have belonged to the same Bavarian family that had dominated the episcopate of Langres since 769.

In 841, at the start of open war between the three sons of Emperor Louis the Pious, Thibaut and Count Warin of Langres joined the side of the youngest brother, Charles the Bald. On 13 April, Thibaut was with Charles and his army at Sens, and celebrated Easter with him at Troyes on 17 April. As a result of Warin and Thibaut's support, the county of Langres fell on Charles's side of the border after the Treaty of Verdun (843) ended the war between the brothers.

== Sources ==
- Nelson, J. L. (1985). "Public Histories and Private History in the Work of Nithard". Speculum. 60 (2): 251–93. doi:10.2307/2846472.
- Nelson, J. L. (1992). Charles the Bald. London: Longman.
- Gérard, Moyse (1988). "Review of Aux origines d'une seigneurie ecclésiastique, Langres et ses évêques, VIII^{e}–XI^{e} siècles: Actes du colloque Langres–Ellwangen, Langres, 28 juin 1985 (Langres: Société historique et archéologique de Langres, 1986)". Bibliothèque de l'école des chartes. 146: 439–41.
- Duchesne, Louis, ed. (1910). Fastes épiscopaux de l'ancienne Gaule, II: L'Aquitaine et les Lyonnaises (2nd ed.). Paris: A. Fontemoing.

Catholic Church titles
Preceded by Alberic	Bishop of Langres; 838/842–856	Succeeded by Isaac
