= Isaac the Good =

Isaac's name in bold in a manuscript of his Canones. The sentence reads: Idcirco ego Isaac indignus Lingonensis episcopus... [Therefore, I, Isaac, unworthy bishop of Langres...]

Isaac the Good (died 18 July 880) was the bishop of Langres in West Francia from 859 until his death.

== Life ==
Isaac was born around 820. He is supposed to have been present at the Council of Quierzy in 840 as a deacon of Laon. After the death of Bishop Theutbald I, Wulfad seized the bishopric of Langres in spite of all opposing canons; but Archbishop Hincmar declared against him, and King Charles the Bald compelled him to flee. Abbot Hilduin of Saint-Denis then proposed Isaac as bishop, and by his influence caused him to be appointed. He was bishop from 859.

Isaac's mildness caused him to be surnamed bonus ('the good'), and the martyrology of the monastery of Saint-Bénigne in Dijon praises him highly. On Charles's orders, he had rebuilt the monastery after it was sacked by Vikings. Abbot Bertilo of Saint-Bénigne served as Isaac's chorbishop. Charles also granted Isaac the right to mint coins at Langres and Dijon. Isaac's name is found among the attendees of the councils of Toul and Langres (859), of Tusey (860), of Pîtres (862), of Verberie and Soissons (866), and of Troyes (878)—evidence that he had gained great consideration and influence. Isaac died on 18 July 880. He was buried in Saint-Bénigne in Dijon. He is venerated as a saint, with his feast on 18 July.

== Works ==
Excerpt from Isaac's Canones in a 10th-century manuscript

A lasting monument of Isaac's efforts to effect a reform among the monastic orders is his work on canon law. Entitled Canones seu selecta capitula, it is a collection of statues drawn mainly from the forged capitularies attributed to Benedict Levita and organized under eleven headings. The Canones is found in eleven manuscripts. After Isaac's death, an unknown editor added a series of canons and this augmented list is found in five of the manuscripts.

In his own words, in his preface, Isaac claims that he compiled the canons to silence his critics, who claimed that his rules were his own fabrications (ficta et excogitata … et inventa). He uncritically accepted the forged capitularies at face value as the product of Boniface's Concilium Germanicum of 742. His selection of canons has a marked penitential character and emphasises the authority of the bishop, while limiting that of the chorbishop.

== Bibliography ==
- Csáky, M. (2003). "Isaac the Good of Langres, St." (PDF). New Catholic Encyclopedia. Vol. 7: Hol–Jub (2nd ed.). Gale. p. 590.
- Heinen, Semih (2017). "Handschrift des Monats November 2017: Paris, BnF, Lat. 3877 – Isaak von Langres und Pseudoisidor". Capitularia: Edition der fränkischen Herrschererlasse.
- Kéry, Lotte (1999). Canonical Collections of the Early Middle Ages (ca. 400–1140): A Bibliographical Guide to the Manuscripts and Literature. Catholic University of America Press.
- Proeschel, Jules N. (1872). "Isaac". In McClintock, John; Strong, James (eds.). Cyclopædia of Biblical, Theological and Ecclesiastical Literature. Vol. 4. New York: Harper and Brothers. p. 670. This article incorporates text from this source, which is in the public domain.
- Viard, Georges (1977). "Les visites pastorales dans l'ancien diocèse de Langres". Revue d'histoire de l'Église de France. 63 (171): 235–272.

Catholic Church titles
Preceded by Theutbald I	Bishop of Langres; 859–880	Succeeded by Geilo
