= Speusippus, Eleusippus and Melapsippus =

Saint Speusippus, Eleusippus and Melapsippus
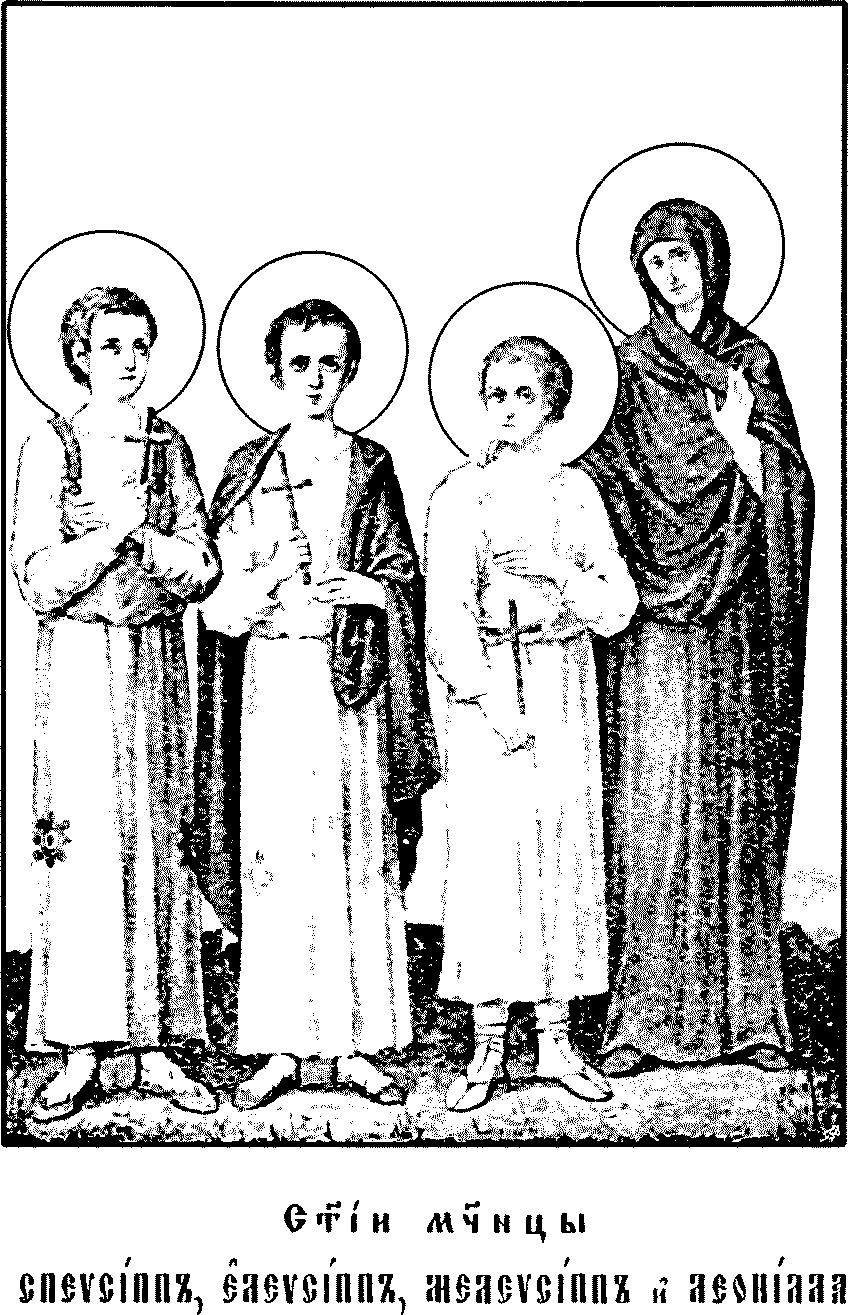

Martyrs
- Died: c. 175 AD
- Venerated in: Catholic Church, Eastern Orthodox Church
- Canonized: Pre-congregation
- Major shrine: Langres Cathedral, Langres, France
- Feast: January 17

Saints Speusippus, Eleusippus, and Melapsippus (Meleusippus) (died c. 175 AD) are venerated as Christian martyrs. Their legend states that Speusippus, Eleusippus, and Melapsippus were Cappadocian triplets who were martyred under Marcus Aurelius.

== Legend ==
Their eldest sister Leonilla was killed with them. Alternatively, Leonilla is stated to have been their grandmother and Junilla their mother, according to the Roman Martyrology.

The author of their Acts is called Saint Neo or Neon, who was himself a martyr.

== Relics ==
In 490, their purported relics were translated to St. Mammès' Cathedral, Langres. A church at Langres also containing their relics bears the name of Saints-Geosmes ("Holy Twins"). Most of their relics were later taken to Swabia and the church of Saint Guy in Ellwangen.

The Diocese of Langres honors as saints a number of martyrs who, according to the St. Benignus legend, died in the persecution of Marcus Aurelius: the triplets, Speusippus, Eleusippus, and Melapsippus; St. Neo their hagiographer, St. Leonilla, their grandmother (or possibly, sister), and St. Junilla, their mother.
