= Jean d'Arcy =

Jean d'Arcy (died August 13, 1344) was a French bishop. He was bishop of Mende (1330–1331), bishop of Autun (1331–1342) and bishop of Langres (1342–1344).
