= Bernard de La Tour (died 1395) =

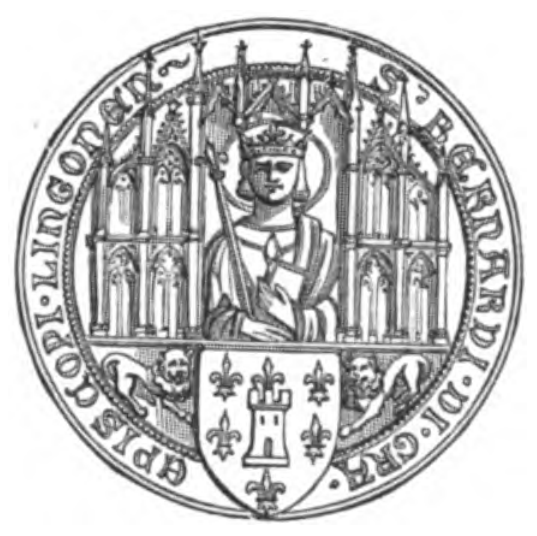
- Reconstructed seal of Bernard de La Tour

Personal details
- Died: 1395
- Parents: Bertrand III, Lord of La Tour; Isabelle de Lévis

Bishop of Langres
- In office 1374–1395
- Preceded by: William of Poitiers
- Succeeded by: Louis I, Duke of Bar

Bernard de La Tour (died 1395) was bishop of Langres from 1374 until his death.

== Life ==
He was the son of Bertrand III, Lord of La Tour and Isabelle de Lévis.

He was prior of Percey and Souvigny and later abbot of Tournus. In 1374 he was elected bishop of Langres by Gregory XI.

He died in 1395.

Catholic Church titles
Preceded by William	Bishop of Langres; 1374 - 1395	Succeeded by Louis
