= Argrim =

Argrim (French: Argrin, Latin: Argrimus) was one of the rival bishops of Langres following the disputed election of 888. He was the uncontested bishop after 899 until his retirement in 910. Before becoming bishop he was a monk of Saint-Bénigne de Dijon.

The death of bishop Geilo of Langres on 28 June 888 after the death of the Emperor Charles III in January resulted in the election of the bishop's successor taking place amidst political upheaval. Argrim was elected by the people in accordance with canon law, and was consecrated by archbishop Aurelian of Lyon. Despite the legality of the entire procedure, archbishop Fulk of Reims, a partisan of Carolingian legitimist claimant Charles III, opposed it and tried to install a rival bishop, Theutbald II. Although Pope Stephen V sided with Fulk, Aurelian refused to consecrate Theutbald and Argrim remained in power at Langres. During this time, Argrim had the support of King Odo of France, who issued a diploma to him on 19 December 889.

After two years and three months, in the autumn of 890, Argrim was forced to flee Langres and Theutbald was installed as bishop. According to the Annales Vedastini, in late 894 Theutbald was assassinated and Argrim returned to power. Pope Formosus immediately anathematised the assassins, but granted the pallium to Argrim. In 896, Pope Stephen VI, who had been an enemy of Formosus, declared Argrim deposed. Argrim went to Rome to protest, and in 899 John IX revoked the deposition. His successor, Benedict IV, confirmed the revocation. In 910 Argrim resigned and returned to Saint-Bénigne de Dijon. His tombstone is preserved in the museum of Chalon-sur-Saône. It reads:

+ IN HOC SEPVLCRO QVI
ESCIT ARGRIMVS MONV
QVONDAM EP'S LINGONI
QVI OBIIT VII KL' FB'R

== Sources ==
- Bouchard, Constance Brittain, ed. (1991). The Cartulary of Flavigny, 717–1113. Cambridge, MA: Medieval Academy of America.
- Duchesne, Louis, ed. (1910). Fastes épiscopaux de l'ancienne Gaule, II: L'Aquitaine et les Lyonnaises (2nd ed.). Paris: A. Fontemoing.
