= Godefroy de la Roche Vanneau =

12th-century French cleric

Godefroy de la Roche Vanneau was bishop of Langres from 1139. He was a prominent aide to his cousin, Bernard of Clairvaux. He was appointed a prior of the Clairvaux Abbey in 1128. He joined the Second Crusade and urged King Louis VII of France to attack Constantinople in 1147.

== Sources ==
- Bredero, Adrian H. (1996) [1993]. Bernard Of Clairvaux: Between Cult and History. T&T Clark. ISBN 0-567-08523-6.
- Lilie, Ralph-Johannes (1993) [1981]. Byzantium and the Crusader States 1096-1204. Oxford University Press. ISBN 0-19-820407-8.
