= Lambert I (bishop of Langres) =

Roman Catholic bishop

Venerable Lambert I (died 1031) was the count–bishop of Langres from 1016 until his death. He is sometimes called "Lambert of Vignory", but this is a result of confusion with bishop Lambert II. Nothing certain is known of his family, save that he had a married sister named Letgardis. Lambert was a cathedral provost under his predecessor, Bruno.

Lambert's election as bishop, after Bruno's death on 30 January 1016, was orchestrated by King Robert II of France, who in return received from the bishop the county of Dijon. Whereas Bruno had been a Carolingian legitimist, Lambert's election represented a shift in allegiance in the Duchy of Burgundy towards the new Capetian dynasty. In October 1016, Lambert presided over the dedication of the renovated abbatial basilica of Saint-Bénigne de Dijon, a project of Bruno's. According to the contemporary chronicler Radulfus Glaber, at the dedication the abbot, William of Volpiano, ranted about the unusual dress and hairstyle of those from southern France who had accompanied King Robert's wife, Constance of Arles. The rant probably belongs in the context of a dispute between old guard (anti-Capetian) and new (pro-Capetian).

In 1019, Lambert extended the proprietary rights of Aimo, count of Bolenois, over the abbacy (abbatia) of Sexfontaines. He granted him the abbey "to make improvements" (in melius augmentando), and permitted his wife and sons to inherit it in lordship (dominatio) under the bishop's authority. Upon their deaths it would have reverted to episcopal control, but in 1030 Lambert authorised its sale to William of Volpiano.

On 8 April 1022, Lambert made a grant to Count Humbert I of Savoy.

== Sources ==
- Bouchard, Constance Brittain (1987). Sword, Miter, and Cloister: Nobility and the Church in Burgundy, 980–1198. Cornell University Press.
- Cognasso, Francesco (1960). "Amedeo I, conte di Savoia". Dizionario Biografico degli Italiani. Vol. 2.
- Geary, Patrick J. (1994). Phantoms of Remembrance: Memory and Oblivion at the End of the First Millennium. Princeton University Press.
- Wood, Susan (2006). The Proprietary Church in the Medieval West. Oxford University Press.
