= Claude de Longwy de Givry =

Cardinal (RC) from 1533-1561

Cardinal Claude de Longwy de Givry
- Cardinal-Priest
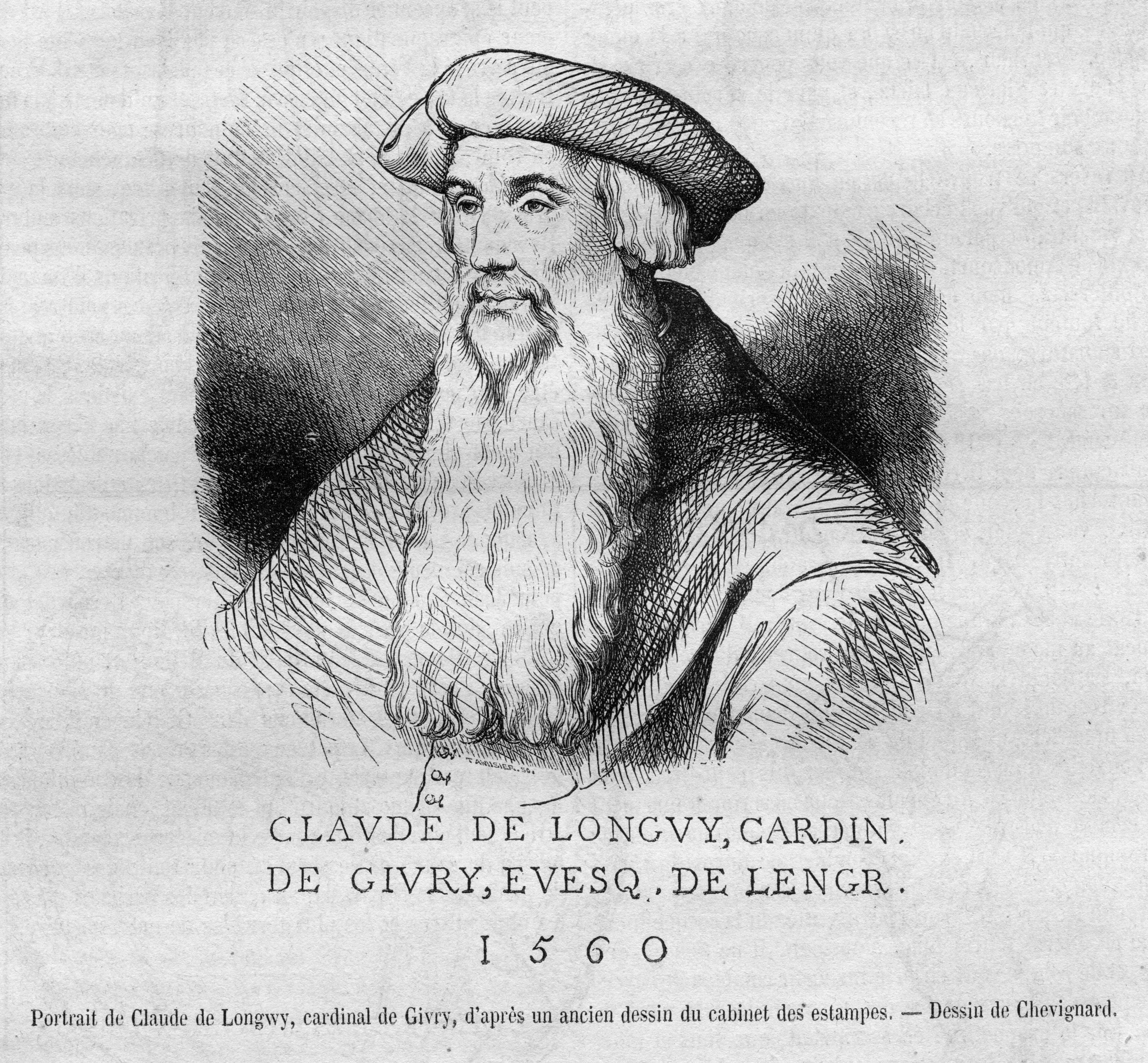
- Church: S. Agnese in Agone
- Diocese: Macon (1510-1529); Langres (1528-1561); Poitiers (1534-1550); Administrator of Périgueux (1540-1541); Administrator of Amiens (1540-1546)
- Other posts: Abbot of Saint-Étienne de Dijon (1529); Abbot of Pothieres; Abbot of Saint-Benigne de Dijon

Orders
- Created cardinal: 7 November 1533 by Pope Clement VII

Personal details
- Born: 1481
- Died: 1561 (aged 79–80) Chateau de Mussy-sur-Seine
- Buried: Cathedral of Langres
- Parents: Philippe de Longuy, Seigneur de Pagny; Jeanne de Bauffremont, dame de Mirabeau

Claude de Longwy de Givry (1481–1561) was a French bishop and Cardinal, from an aristocratic background. He was the son of Philippe de Longuy, Seigneur de Givry and Jeanne de Beautremont, Dame de Mirabeau. He had four brothers: Jean de Longuy, Sieur de Givry and Baron de Mirabeau (who married Jeanne d'Orleans, natural sister of King Francis I), Christophe de Longuy, Antoine de Longuy, and Étienne de Longuy. Claude's aunt Jeanne had married Guy de la Baume, Count de Montrevel, and one of their sons was Cardinal Pierre de la Baume (1539-1544), Prince and Bishop of Geneva (1522-1543).

== Bishop of Macon ==
Claude de Longuy became bishop of Mâcon, in 1510, as successor to his uncle Étienne de Longwy (1488-1510). He attended the schismatic Conciliabulum of Pisa in 1511, no doubt on the command of King Louis XII. On 16 March 1516 he made his solemn entry. He served as Bishop of Macon until 1529. On 10 January 1527, the Bishop's niece, Jeanne de Longuy was married to Philippe Chabot de Brion, Governor of Burgundy.

== Royal Council ==
He became a member of the royal Council by 1523. On 23 May 1526 Bishop de Givry presided at a meeting of the Estates of the Mâconnais; this was the first time that the Bailly of Macon did not preside at a meeting of the Estates, the privilege being given by the Letters of Convocation on this occasion to Bishop de Longuy personally. Obviously he was highly trusted by the King's Regency Council. On 7 July 1527 the Bishop was present at a meeting of the Estates of Auxonne. In 1527 Claude de Longwy served as Vicar General of Archbishop François de Rohan of Lyon in the council held in Lyon to raise money for the ransom of King Francis I, who was a prisoner of Charles V in Madrid.

Longwy was subsequently bishop of Langres (1528-1561), and then bishop of Poitiers (1534-1550).

In 1529 Bishop de Longwy was appointed Abbot Commendatory of Saint-Étienne de Dijon. The bulls were issued by Pope Clement VII on 13 February 1530. He was also the thirty-ninth Abbot of Pothieres (Pultariae, Poultieres). He was also the eighty-seventh Abbot of Saint-Benigne de Dijon

In 1532 Bishop de Longwy was sent as Ambassador Extraordinary to England. He arrived on 6 September 1532, spent one night in London, and returned to France on 11 September.

From 27 August 1540 to 27 August 1541 the Bishop was Administrator of the diocese of Périgueux, on the nomination of King Francis I of France. He was named Administrator of the diocese of Amiens on 24 September 1540, in succession to another Cardinal Administrator, Charles de Hemard (9 December 1538 – 23 August 1540); Longwy held the Administratorship until 12 February 1546.

In February 1545, at Joinville, Bishop de Longwy consecrated the twenty-year-old Charles de Guise-Lorraine a bishop. He had been named Archbishop of Reims in 1538, and became the Cardinal de Guise in 1547.

== Cardinal ==
He was created cardinal-priest in the fourteenth Consistory for the promotion of cardinals, held by Pope Clement VII in Marseille on 7 November 1533, shortly after the marriage of his niece, Catherine de' Medici, to Prince Henri, the future king. On 10 November Longwy was assigned the titular church of S. Agnese in Agone. Cardinal de Longwy was also known as the Cardinal de Givry (a title also later applied to his grand-nephew, Cardinal Anne d'Escars de Givry). He did not, however, attend the Conclave of 11–12 October 1534, in which Cardinal Alessandro Farnese was elected Pope Paul III. Neither did he attend the Conclave of 29 November 1549—7 February 1550, following the death of Paul III, at which Cardinal Giovanni Ciocchi del Monte was elected Pope Julius III. Nor did he attend either of the two Conclaves of 1555. His absence from the Conclave of 1559, therefore, is hardly surprising.

A patron of architecture, the Cardinal also commissioned eight tapestries for the Cathedral of Langres in 1543, on the subject of Mammes of Caesarea who is venerated in Langres. Only three of the tapestries survive, two at Langres and one in the Louvre.

== Death ==
Cardinal Claude de Longwy de Givry died on 9 August 1561. He was buried in the Cathedral of Langres on the right side of the main altar, in a tomb which he had constructed for himself while still living.

== Books ==
- Gallia Christiana in provincias ecclesiasticas distributa: qua series et historia archiepiscoporum, episcoporum, et abbatum franciae vicinarumque ditionum... (in Latin). Vol. Tomus quartus (IV). Paris: ex typographia regia. 1728.
- Eubel, Konrad (1901). Hierarchia catholica medii aevi: 1434-1503 (in Latin). Vol. II (editio altera 1914 ed.). Münster: sumptibus et typis librariae Regensbergianae.
- Gulik, Guilelmus van; Konrad Eubel (1923). L. Schmitz-Kallenberg (ed.). Hierarchia catholica medii aevi (in Latin). Vol. III (editio altera ed.). Münster: sumptibus et typis librariae Regensbergianae.
- L. E. Marcel (1926), Le Cardinal de Givry, évêque de Langres, 1529-1561 2 vols.
- Viard, Georges; Decron, Benoit; Wu Fang-Cheng, "La Cathédrale du cardinal de Givry. Les tapisseries de Saint-Mammès," La Cathédrale Saint-Mammès de Langres. Histoire – Architecture – Décor (Langres 1994), pp. 97–102.
- Campbell, Thomas P. (2002). Tapestry in the Renaissance: Art and Magnificence. New York: Metropolitan Museum of Art-Yale University Press. pp. 272, 477–478. ISBN 978-1-58839-022-6.
