= Mammes of Caesarea =

Child-martyr of the 3rd century

Saint Mammes of Caesarea
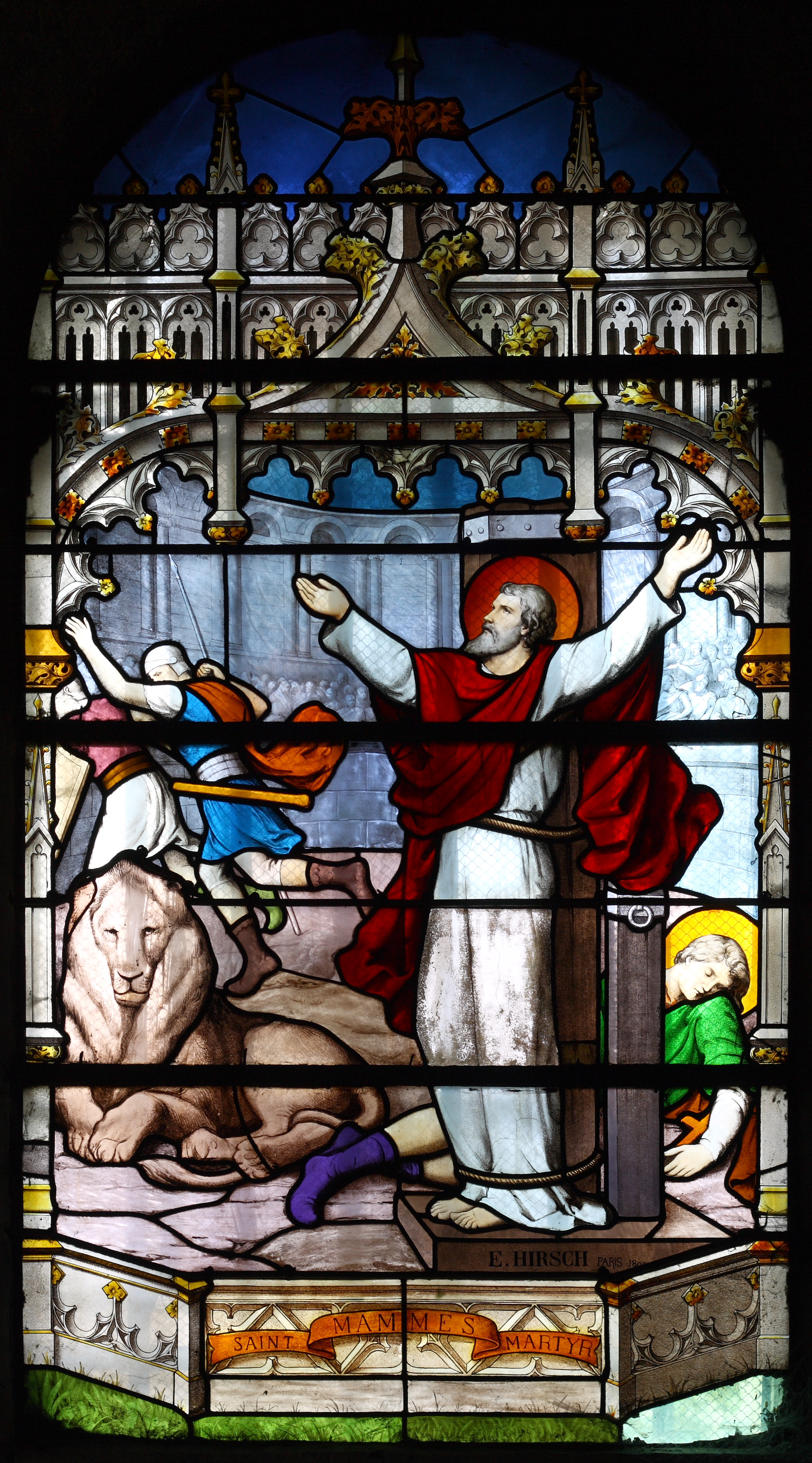
- St Mammes, stained-glass window by Emile Hirsch; Église Saint-Jean-Baptiste, Sceaux

Great Martyr
- Born: ~259
- Died: ~275
- Venerated in: Roman Catholic Church; Eastern Orthodox Church; Armenian Apostolic Church; Assyrian Church of the East
- Feast: 7 August (Spain); 17 August (Roman Catholic calendar); 2 September (Eastern Orthodox and Maronite calendars)
- Attributes: Lion
- Patronage: Langres; babies who are breastfeeding; protector of sufferers from broken bones and hernias (the latter in Murero, in Zaragoza).

Saint Mammes of Caesarea (Mamas, Mammas, Mammet, Mema; Greek: Μάμας; French: Mammès; Italian: Mamante; Spanish: Mamés; Portuguese: Mamede; Arabic: ماما/ماماس) was a child-martyr of the 3rd century, who was martyred at Caesarea. His parents, Theodotus and Rufina, were also martyred.

== Life ==
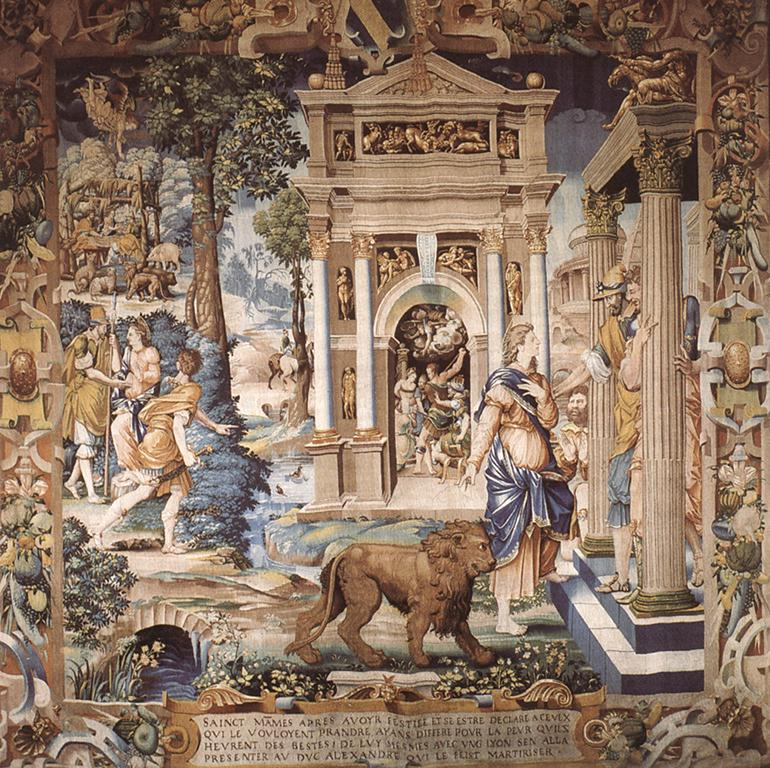
Saint Mammes and Duke Alexander, tapestry by Jean Cousin the Elder, ca. 1541.

Born in prison to parents who had been jailed for being Christians, Mammes became an orphan when his parents were executed. After their death, Mammes was raised by a rich widow named Ammia, who died when Mammes was 15 years old.

According to legend, Mammes was tortured for his faith by the governor of Caesarea and was then sent before the Roman Emperor Aurelian, who tortured him again. The Mammes legend states that an angel then liberated him and ordered him to hide on a mountain near Caesarea.

Mammes was later thrown to the lions, but he managed to make the beasts docile by preaching to them. Afterward, a lion remained with him as a companion. Accompanied by the lion, he visited Duke Alexander, who sentenced him to death. He was struck in the stomach with a trident. Bleeding, Mammes dragged himself to a spot near a theater before his soul was carried into heaven by angels.

== Veneration ==
The center of his cult was situated at Caesarea and later shifted to Langres when his relics were brought there. The Cathédrale Saint-Mammès, in Langres, is dedicated to him. Mammes is the chief patron of the diocese.

=== Lebanon ===
Saint Mammes is also a popular saint in Lebanon with many churches and convents named in his honor. He is the patron saint of Deir Mimas in Lebanon. Grand festivities are organized each year when the town celebrates the feast of Saint Mamas on September 15. The town has both an orthodox monastery, which overlooks the Litani valley of Deirmimas, and a Melkite catholic church, located inside the village, named after Saint Mammes.

Mammes is also honored in Kfarhata, which is adjacent to Zgharta. The Church of Saint Mamas in Ehden was built in 749 A.D. and is one of the oldest Maronite Catholic churches in Lebanon. Lebanon is also home to the Saint Mamas Church of Baabdat, which was built in the 16th century.

Another Maronite Lebanese monastery called Dayr Mar Mamas is being restored by the town's folks of the rural village of Bechaaleh (also spelled Bechealeh) located in the district of Batroun in the north of Lebanon.

=== Cyprus ===
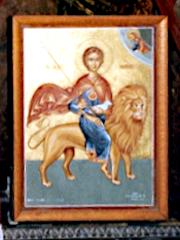
St Mamas, the lamb and the lion: icon in the church at Morphou

In Cyprus, Mammes is popularly known as a poor hermit who lived in a cave near the town of Morphou. According to local legend, he lived in very poor circumstances, and when the authorities tried to tax him, he evaded them. Soldiers were sent out and they captured him, but on the way back to town, Mammes saw a lion attacking a lamb, escaped the soldiers, saved the lamb, jumped on the lion's back, and rode it into town. His bravery earned him exemption from taxation.

St. Mamas Monastery is the third most important place of worship for the Greek Orthodox in Cyprus after St. Barnabas tomb at Famagusta and Apostolos Andreas Monastery at Karpasia.

There is also a village named after Saint Mamas (Άγιος Μάμας) in the northern part of the Limassol district with the main church of the village dedicated to the martyred saint.

The Greek Orthodox Church celebrates his memory on the 2nd of September.

=== Greece ===
There are numerous churches dedicated to Mammes of Caesarea in Greece and there are even villages in Greece named Agios Mamas (Άγιος Μάμας in Greek) after him in Chalkidiki, Crete and Laconia. There is also a Saint Mamas church in the village of Afrodisia in Chios, Greece.

=== Spain (San Mamés) ===
Pilgrims on their way to Santiago de Compostela diffused his cult into Spain.

A statue depicting Mammes and a lion can be found in the Casa de la Misericordia in Bilbao, which was once the convent of San Mamés and whose current chapel holds an alleged piece of bone from his cranium. The home stadium used by Athletic Bilbao is called San Mamés Stadium, and players of that club are called the "lions of San Mamés".

His head is said to rest in the parish church of Santa María Magdalena in Zaragoza.

An alternative legend states that he was devoured by lions.

At Tábara, also in Spain, he is venerated alongside Saint Blaise.

=== Italy (San Mamete) ===
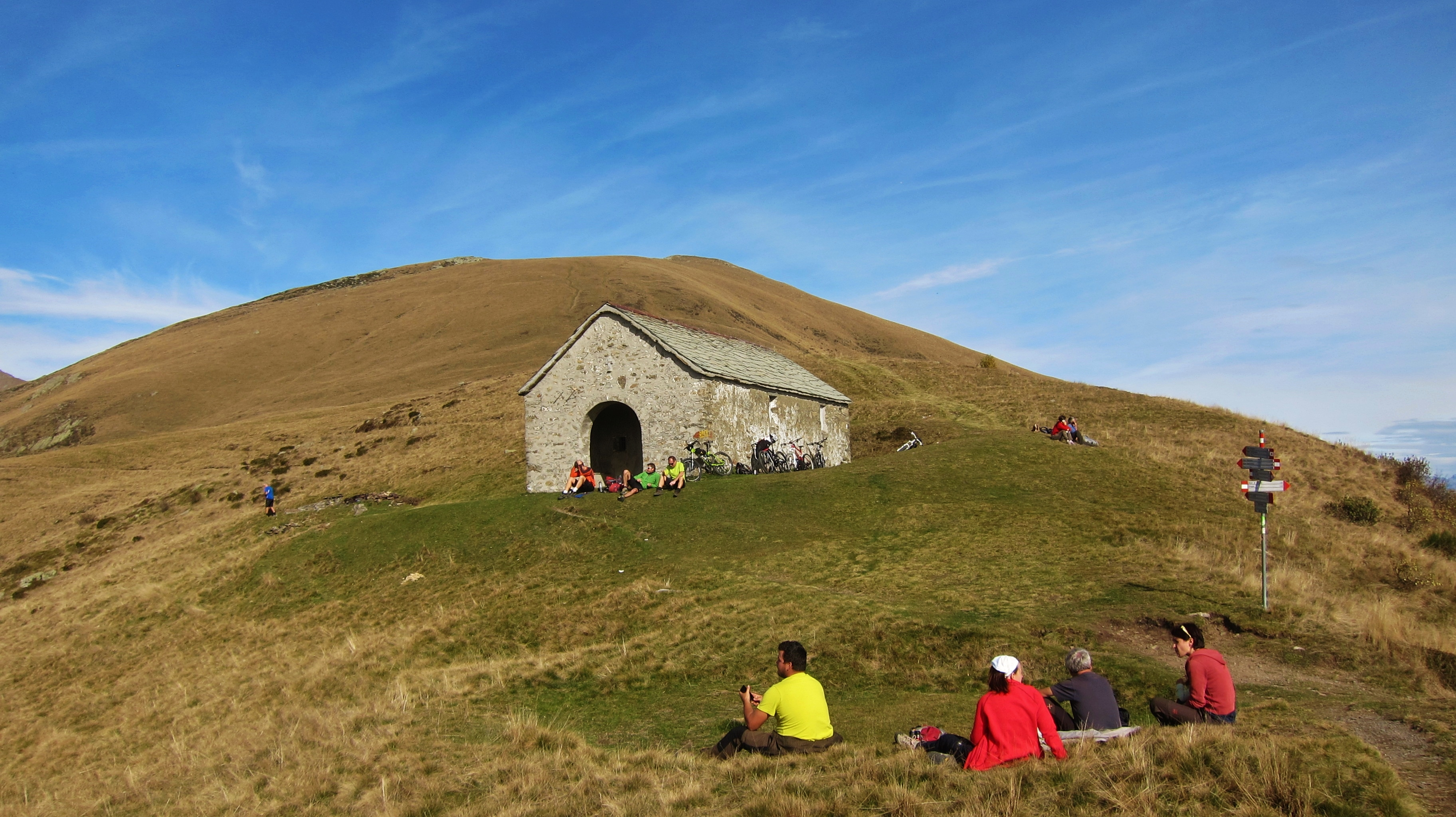
The chapel of Sant'Amate on Monte Grona, in Plesio municipality, near Como

In some regions of Italy, particularly Brianza, north of Milan, San Mamete is particularly venerated by new mothers who wish to produce abundant breastmilk for a newborn. Special rites took place until recent times: the women who felt the need to ask the help of the Saint went to the church bringing some bread and cheese, which they placed upon the altar. The mother was obliged to offer the bread and cheese to the first person she encountered. This was hoped to achieve San Mamete's mercy through a lot of pan di fioeu (Milanese and Brianzoeu for "bread of children", i.e. milk).

=== Portugal (São Mamede) ===
The Battle of São Mamede is considered a crucial event in the foundation of the Kingdom of Portugal. A number of places in Portugal are named after this Christian saint; São Mamede (Lisbon), a quarter of Lisbon; São Mamede de Este, a town in Braga; São Mamede de Infesta, a town in Matosinhos; the Igreja de São Mamede, a church building in Évora; the Serra de São Mamede, a mountain range in Portalegre District; a town in Trofa, and São Mamede, Paraíba, a municipality in the state of Paraíba, Brazil.
