= Jacques-Marie-Adrien-Césaire Mathieu =

French cardinal

His Eminence Jacques-Marie-Adrien-Césaire Mathieu
- Cardinal, Archbishop of Besançon
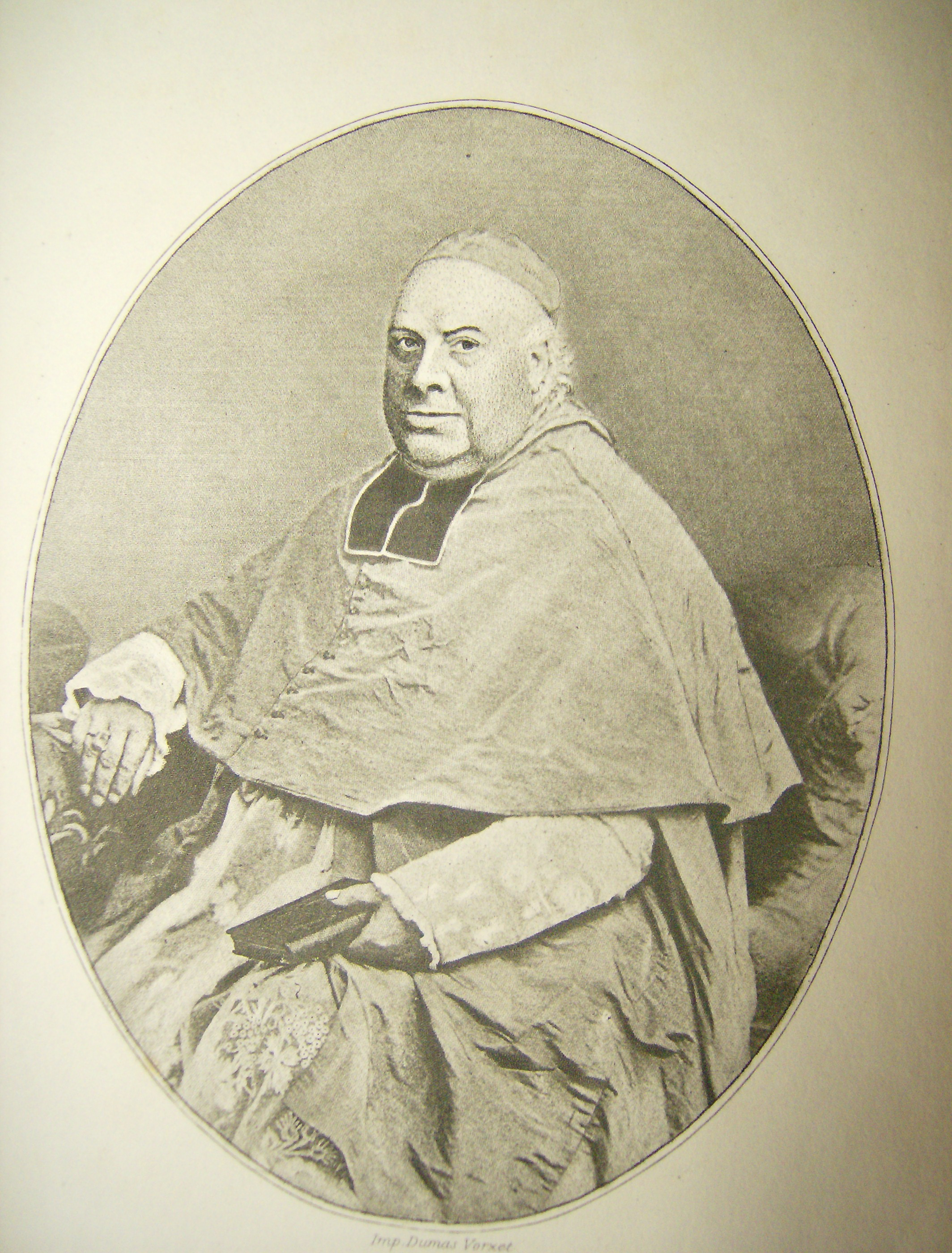
- Church: Roman Catholic Church
- Archdiocese: Besançon
- See: Besançon
- Appointed: 30 September 1834
- Term ended: 9 July 1875
- Predecessor: Louis-Guillaume-Valentin DuBourg
- Successor: Pierre-Antoine-Justin Paulinier
- Other post: Cardinal-Priest of San Silvestro in Capite (1852-75)
- Previous post: Bishop of Langres (1832-34)

Orders
- Ordination: 1 June 1822
- Consecration: 20 February 1833 by Hyacinthe-Louis de Quélen
- Created cardinal: 30 September 1850 by Pope Pius IX
- Rank: Cardinal-Priest

Personal details
- Born: Jacques-Marie-Adrien-Césaire Mathieu; 20 January 1796 Paris, French First Republic
- Died: 9 July 1875 (aged 79) Besançon, French Third Republic
- Coat of arms

Styles of Jacques-Marie-Adrien-Césaire Mathieu
- Reference style: His Eminence
- Spoken style: Your Eminence
- Religious style: Monsignor
- Informal style: Cardinal
- See: Besançon

Jacques-Marie-Adrien-Césaire Mathieu (1796–1875) was a French cardinal of the Roman Catholic Church and archbishop of Besançon.

== Life ==
Jacques-Marie-Adrien-Césaire Mathieu was born on 20 January 1796 in Paris, where his father was a commission agent in the silk trade. Jacques-Marie's brother became a distinguished captain in the Franch Navy. Jacques-Marie studied law and worked for a solicitor, managing property for the Montmorency family.

In 1819, Mathieu entered Saint-Sulpice Seminary and was ordained a priest on 1 June 1822. In 1823, he was appointed secretary to Charles-Louis Salmon de Chatellier, bishop of Evreux, who named him vicar-general and superior of the diocesan seminary. He was made a titular canon of Paris in 1828 and promoter of the Legal Office of the archdiocese of Paris in 1829.

He was elected bishop of Langres on 17 December 1832. On 10 February 1833 he was consecrated in the Carmelite Church on the Rue de Vaugirard in Paris, by Archbishop Hyacinthe-Louis de Quélen assisted by Bishops Pierre-Marie Cottret and Marie-Joseph de Prilly.

On 30 September 1834 he assumed the metropolitan see of Besançon, where he remained until his death. On 30 September 1850 Pope Pius IX elevated him to cardinal; in 1852 he became Cardinal-Priest of San Silvestro in Capite.

As a member of the senate he was a zealous defender of the rights of the Church, and, in spite of the interdict of the government, he published the papal encyclical of 8 December 1864. He participated in the deliberations of Vatican Council I.

He died on 9 July 1875 in Besançon.

Mathieu is the author of "Devoirs Du Sacerdoce ou Traité de la Dignité, de la Perfection, des Obligations... du Prêtre Catholique", and an "Office of the Mass and Vespers of the Immaculate Conception of the Blessed Virgin Mary, in Latin and in French..." ( 1874 )
