= Langres Cathedral =

French church

Coordinates: 47°51′51″N 5°20′7″E

Langres Cathedral Cathédrale Saint-Mammès de Langres
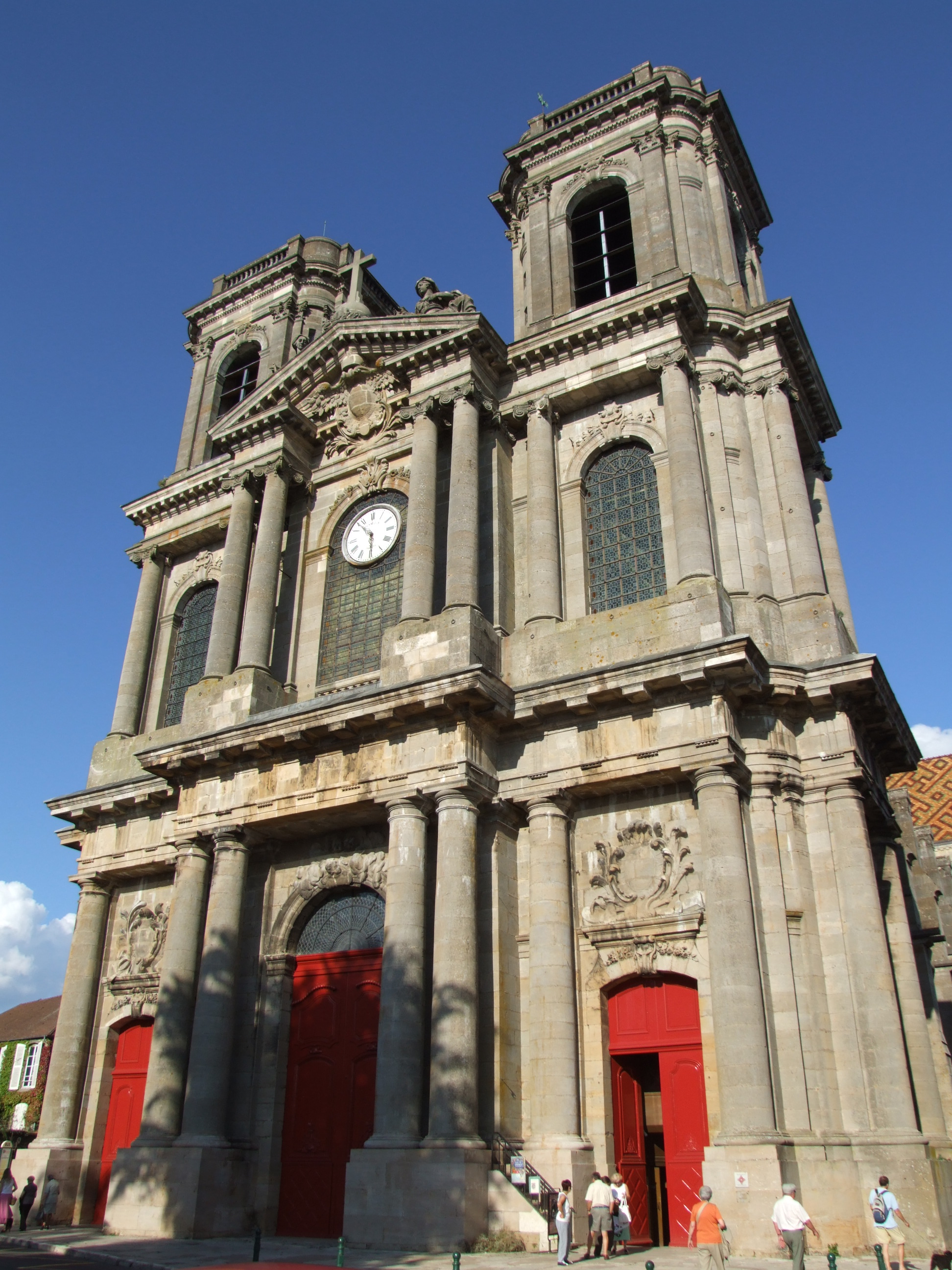
- Langres Cathedral

Religion
- Affiliation: Roman Catholic Church
- Province: Bishop of Langres
- Region: Haute-Marne
- Rite: Roman
- Ecclesiastical or organisational status: Cathedral
- Status: Active

Location
- Location: Langres, France
- Interactive map of Langres Cathedral; Cathédrale Saint-Mammès de Langres

Architecture
- Type: Church
- Style: Romanesque, Gothic, Classical
- Groundbreaking: 12th century
- Completed: 19th century

Langres Cathedral (French: Cathédrale Saint-Mammès de Langres) is a Roman Catholic church in Langres, France. It was erected in the twelfth century, and is dedicated to the 3rd-century martyr Mammes of Caesarea. The cathedral is the seat of the Bishop of Langres, and is a national monument. The nave and interior are in the Romanesque and French Gothic style while the later facade is an example of French Neoclassical architecture.

== History ==
=== Romanesque and Gothic construction ===
At the time that the cathedral was built, the diocese of Langres was considerably larger; it reached further south and included Dijon, which did not become a separate diocese until 1731. Around 1140, bishop Geoffroy de La Roche-Vanneau (1138–1162), a close friend of Saint Bernard of Clairvaux, took the decision to rebuild the cathedral. At that time the cathedral of Saint-Étienne in Sens, the first fully Gothic cathedral, was already under construction.

The choir and the ambulatory were constructed first, followed by the nave and the transept. The architecture was a blend of Romanesque and the new Gothic. Its form was influenced by the third church of Cluny Abbey, with its large central vessel in the particular Romanesque style of Burgundy, and its three level elevation; large arcades of massive pillars on the ground floor, a narrow triforium or passage above, with Corinthian pilasters; and high windows. The vaults of the ambulatory were supported by Corinthian columns. The choir's flying buttresses were hidden, but those of the nave can be seen from the outside. It is documented by a bull of Pope Alexander III, who had taken refuge at Sens from 1163 to 1165, that in 1170 building was well underway. It only lacked the first span of the nave and the facade, or west front.

In 1190, following the sale of church lands to the west, a last campaign was undertaken with a view to finishing the building.and the cathedral was dedicated in 1196. At that date it appears that only the vaults of the nave were still unfinished. In 1209, the holy relic of the head of Saint Mammes was brought to the cathedral, giving the cathedral enhanced status as a pilgrimage destination.

In the thirteenth century the cloister was built (of which two arcades remain today) as well as the chapel of the Virgin in the apse (promoted by the canon of Vergy). In 1314, a fire destroyed the nave's roof.

=== Renaissance additions - Chapel of the Holy Cross ===
In the sixteenth century, from 1547 to 1551, the canon d'Amoncourt, vicar-general of Claude de Longwy who was then bishop of Langres, had the chapel of the Holy Cross built in the new Renaissance style on the left-hand side of the nave. In 1555, the Cardinal de Givry added another particular Renaissance feature; a very ornate jube or choir screen, surrounding the area of the church reserved for the clergy. The choir screen survived long after similar screens were demolished in other French cathedrals, due to a change in church doctrine. It survived until the French Revolution, when it was destroyed.

=== Eighteenth century – the west front ===
By the 18th century the Romanesque towers on the west front were in danger of collapse. The bell tower over transept was in such poor state that it had to be removed in 1782. In 1746, the west front also threatened to collapse, and the decision was taken to demolish it. It was rebuilt from 1761 to 1786 in the classical style by the architect Claude-Louis D'Aviler. The works were managed by the architect Jean-Antoine Caristie. Following the French Revolution, the cathedral was closed and was transformed for a time into a Temple of Reason, and then a storehouse for grain. It did not reopen for worship until 1800.

=== 19th and 21st century ===
Beginning in 1852, the upper parts of the cathedral were renovated by the architect Alphonse Durand. He systematically rebuilt the nave (1853–54), the sacristy (entirely rebuilt between 1857 and 1862), The roof was replaced in 1855, and the choir and apse were restored beginning in 1856. The transept was rebuilt beginning in 1860 and the west front beginning in 1860.

Beginning in 1999, the colourful tile roof of the nave and transept was replaced by new tiles organised in the same geometric design as the tiles installed by Durand in the 19th century.

== Exterior ==
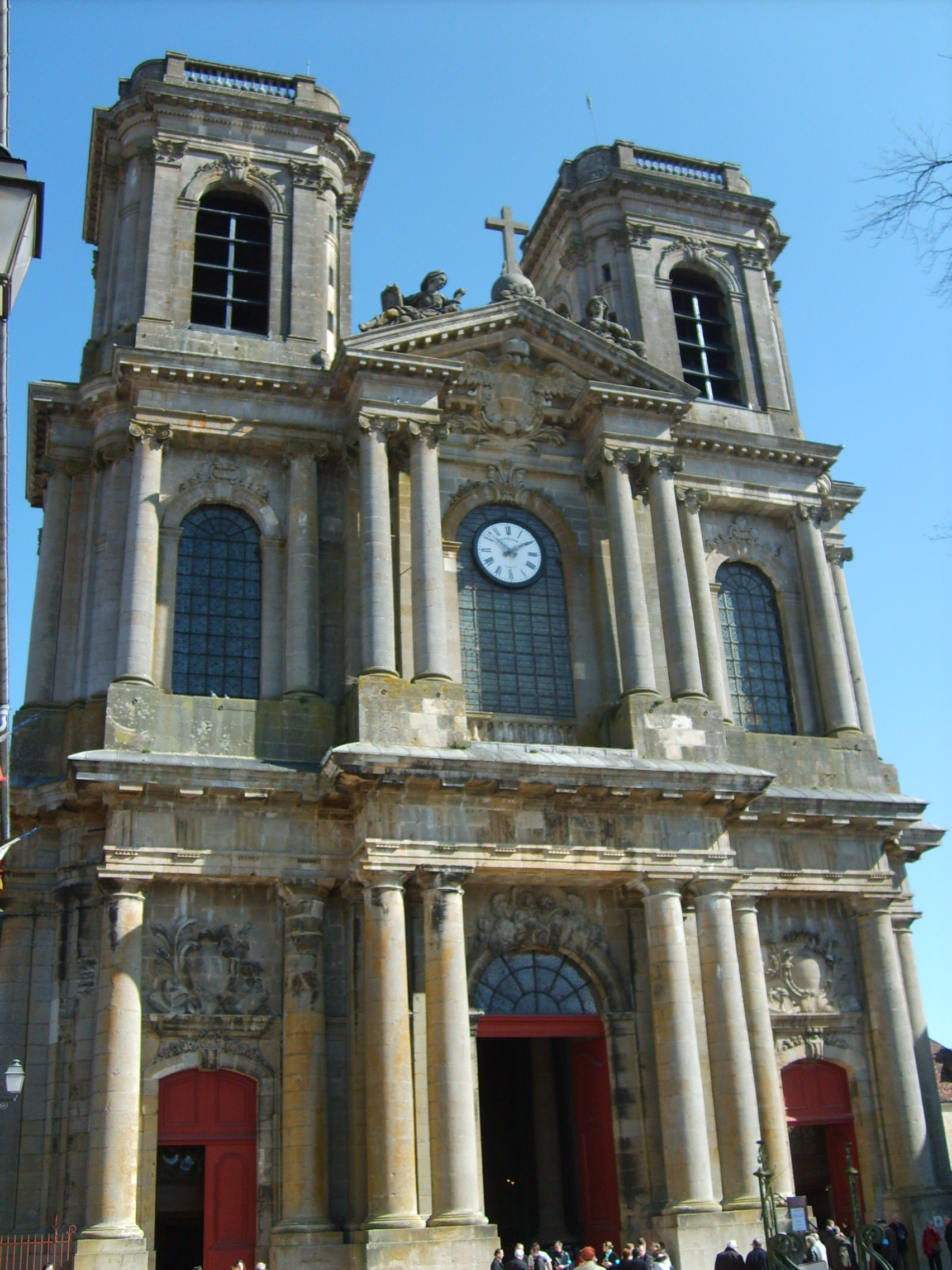
The west front

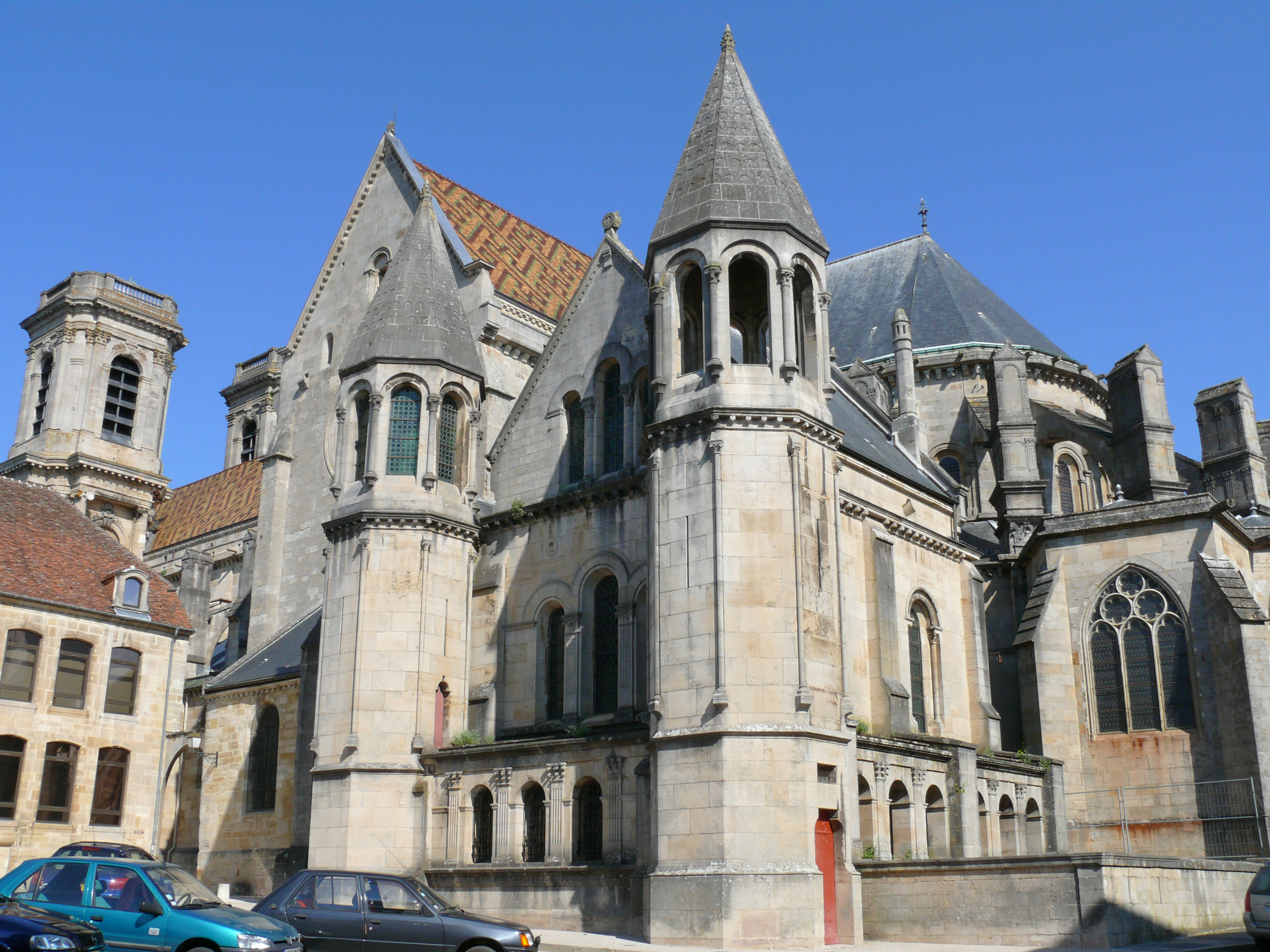
South side - transept (Center) and chevet (right)

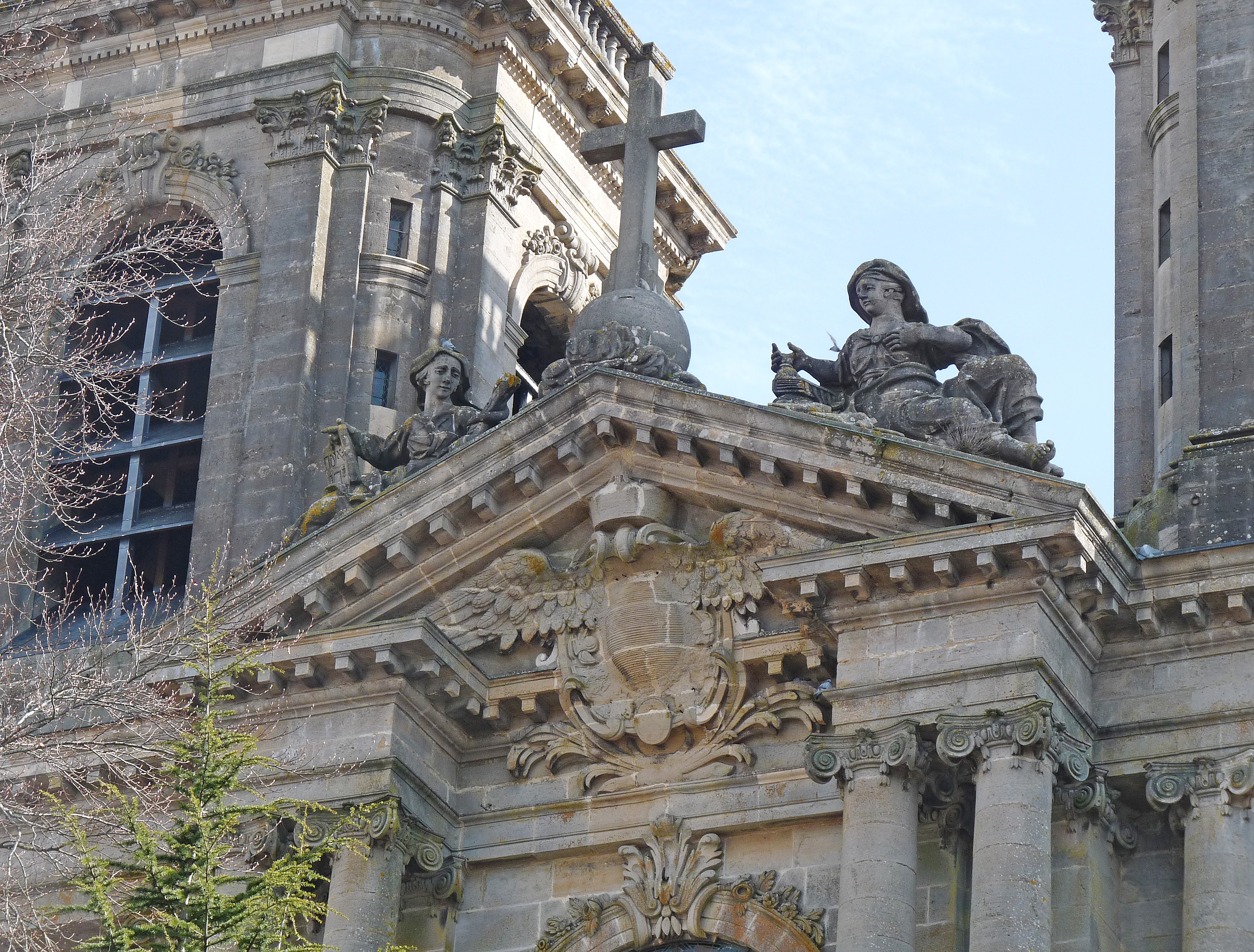
The 18th-century fronton of the cathedral

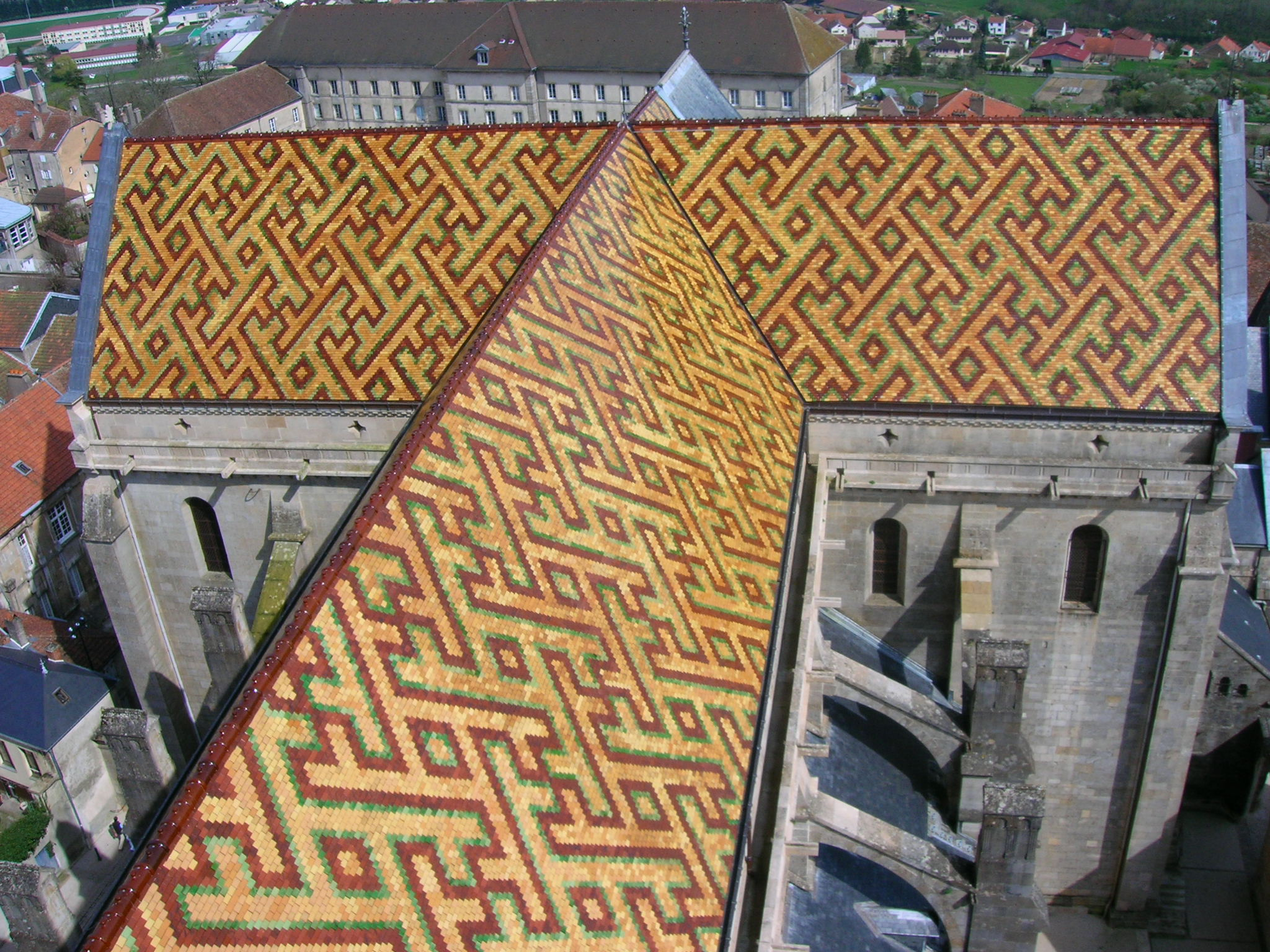
The polychrome tile roof, a Burgundy speciality

The classical west front or facade was constructed between 1754 and 1768, when it appeared that the Romanesque towers were in danger of collapse. The columns on the facade have capitals of different styles at each level, rising from the Doric order the to Ionic order to the Corinthian order, a typical feature of the classical style. The tile roof of the cathedral is from a different tradition, that of the architecture of Burgundy. The flying buttresses that support the walls of the nave are largely hidden by walls of the adjoining cloister and chapel, but those of the hemispherical chevet at the east end are dramatically visible.

== Interior ==
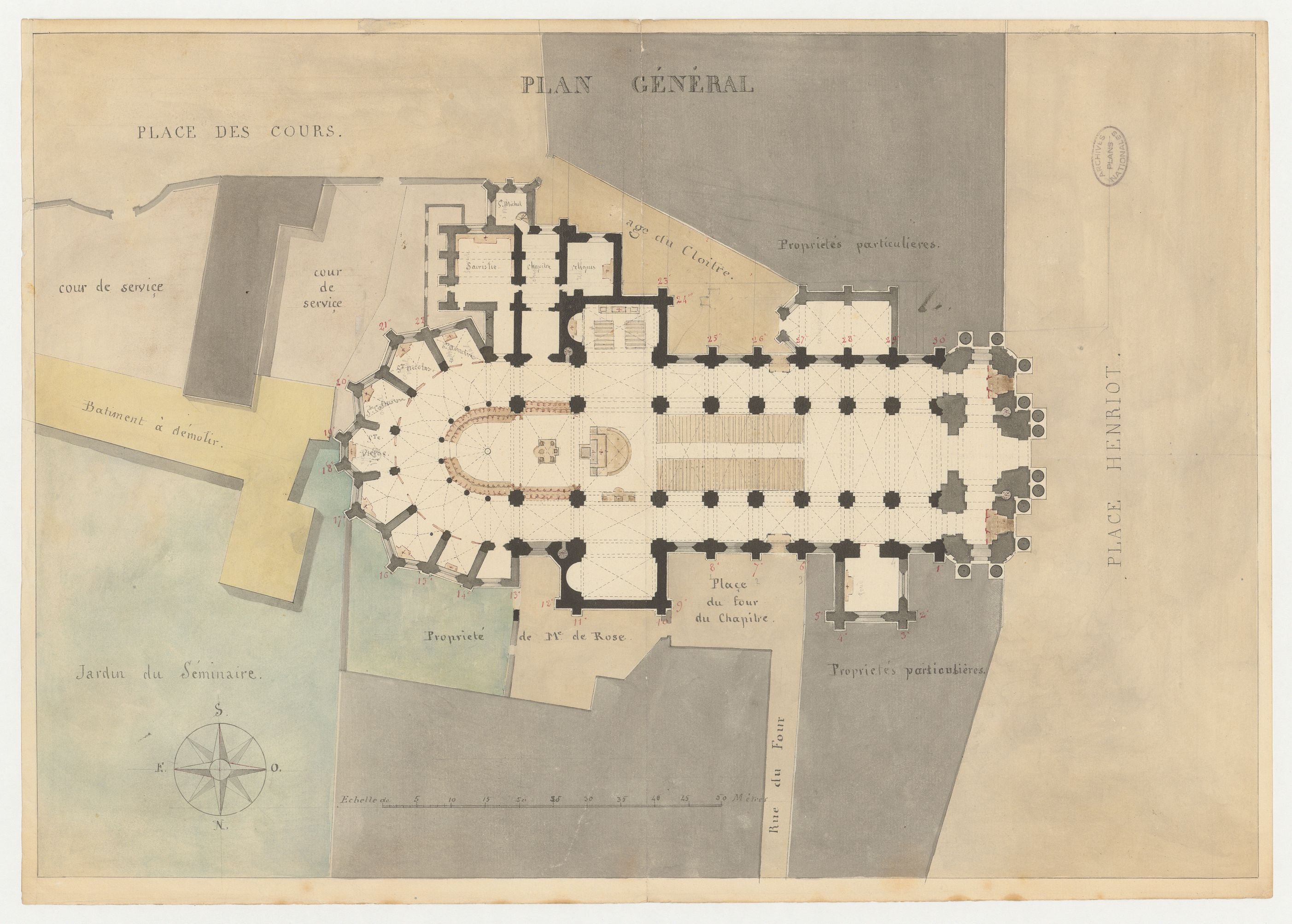
Plan of Langres Cathedral

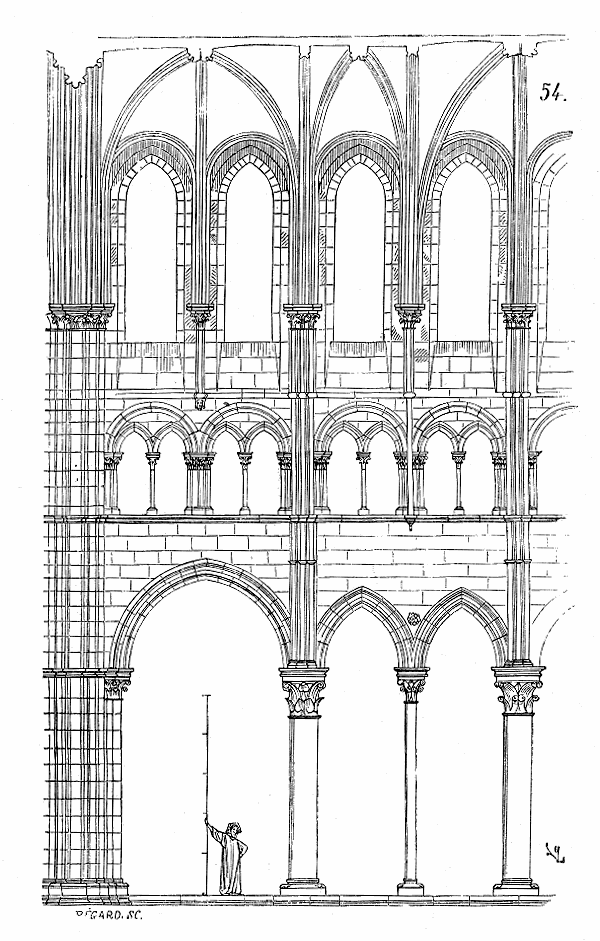
Elevation of the choir

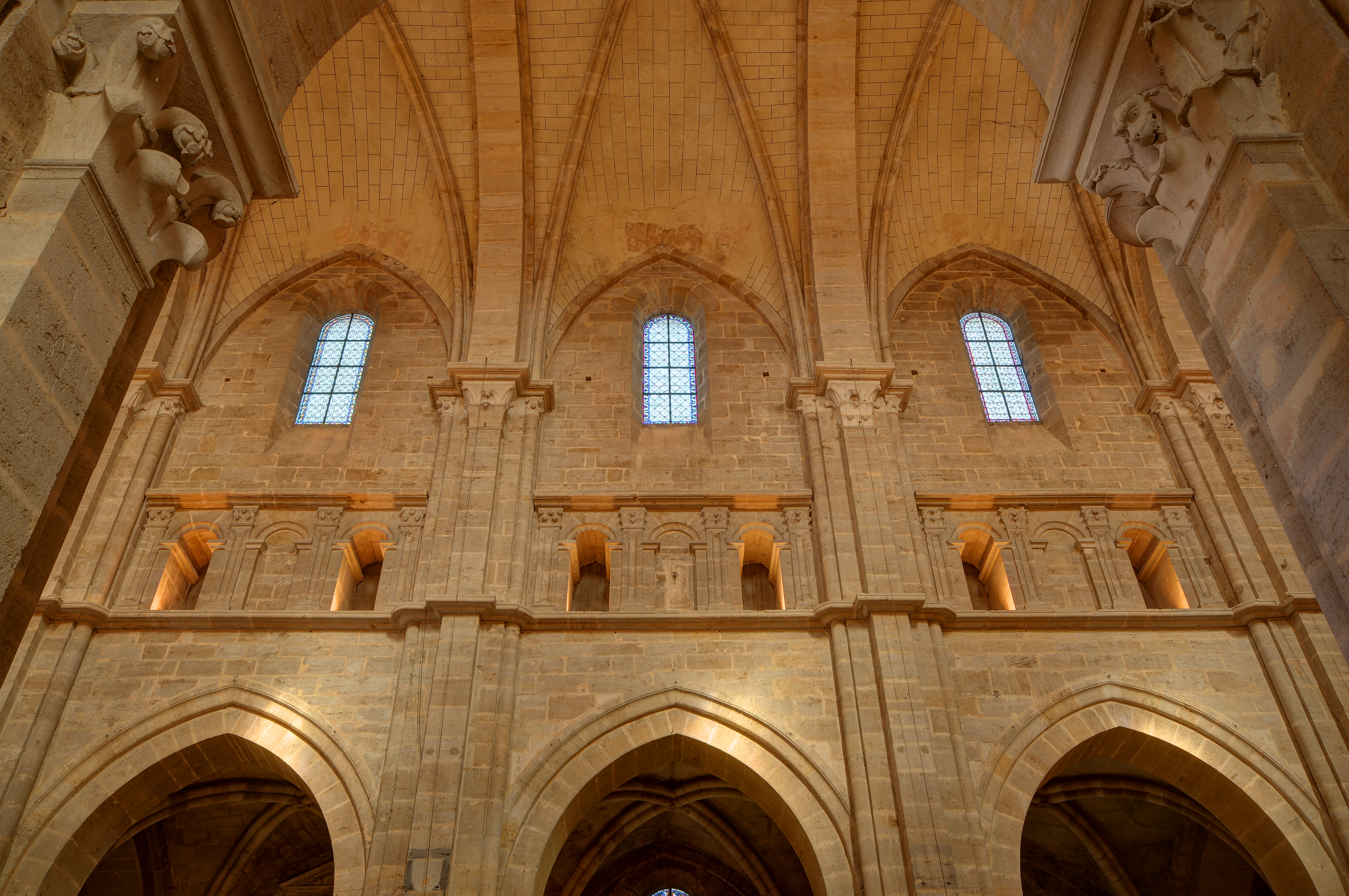
Walls of the nave

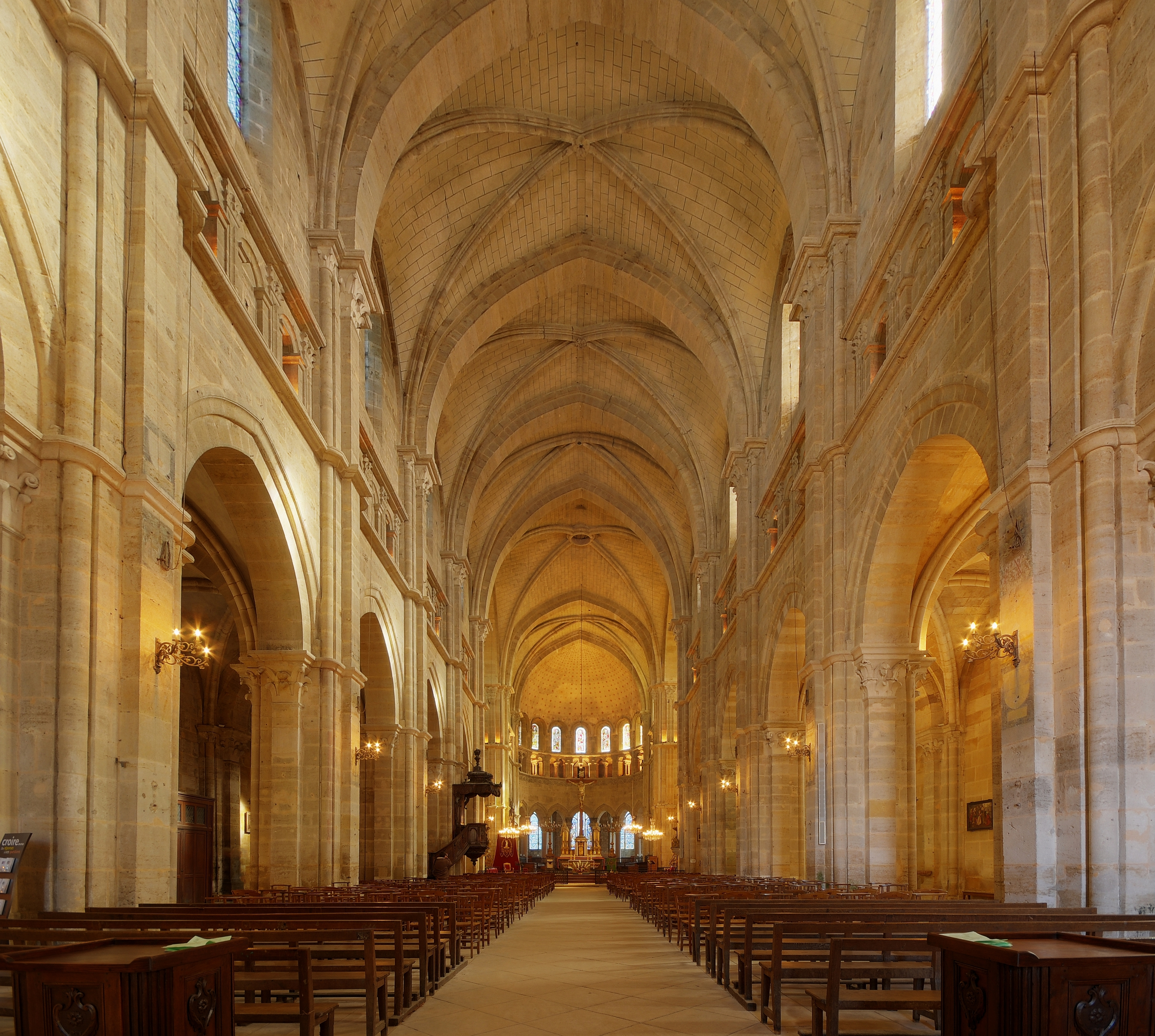
The nave looking east

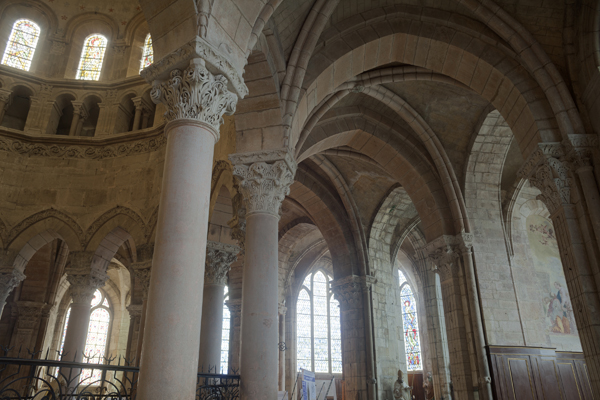
Ambulatory at the east end

The interior is very spacious; 94 meters long, 43 meters long wide, with a height of 23 meters in the nave. It has three levels; very high galleries supported by massive pillars; a narrow gallery, or triforium, without windows; and the high windows of the upper level, reaching upward to the vaults. Corinthian columns rise from the pillars and pass between the windows to support the vaults. Bands of sculpture in vegetal motifs decorate the triforium.

At the east end, the round point of the choir is surrounded by eight Corinthian columns, forming broken arches and decorated with molding, The apse contains five small chapels; Around the apse are five chapels; only the center, or axis chapel, dates to the earliest Romanesque cathedral; the others were constructed in the 14th century.

== The Chapel of the Holy Cross ==
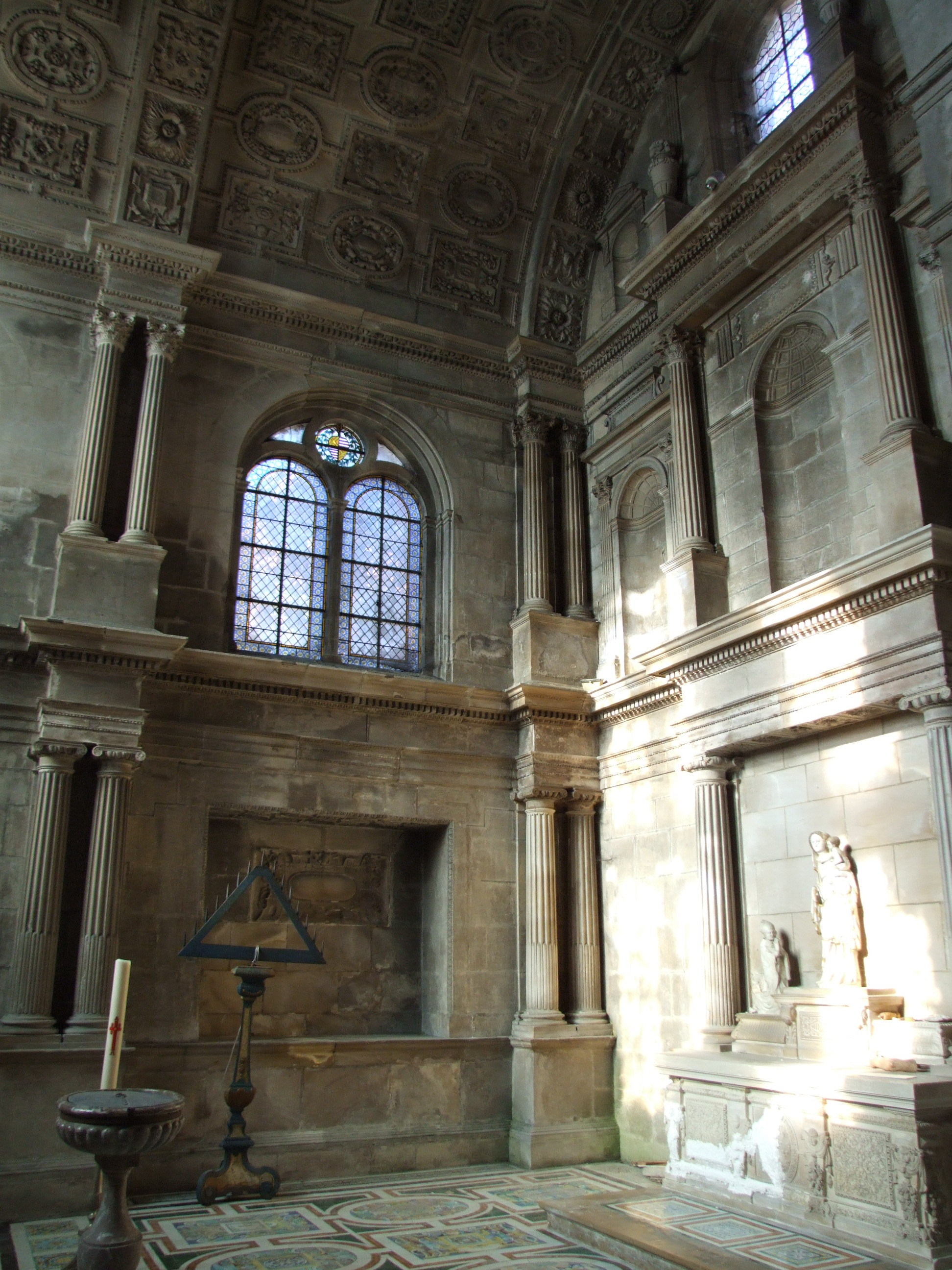
Chapel of the Holy Cross

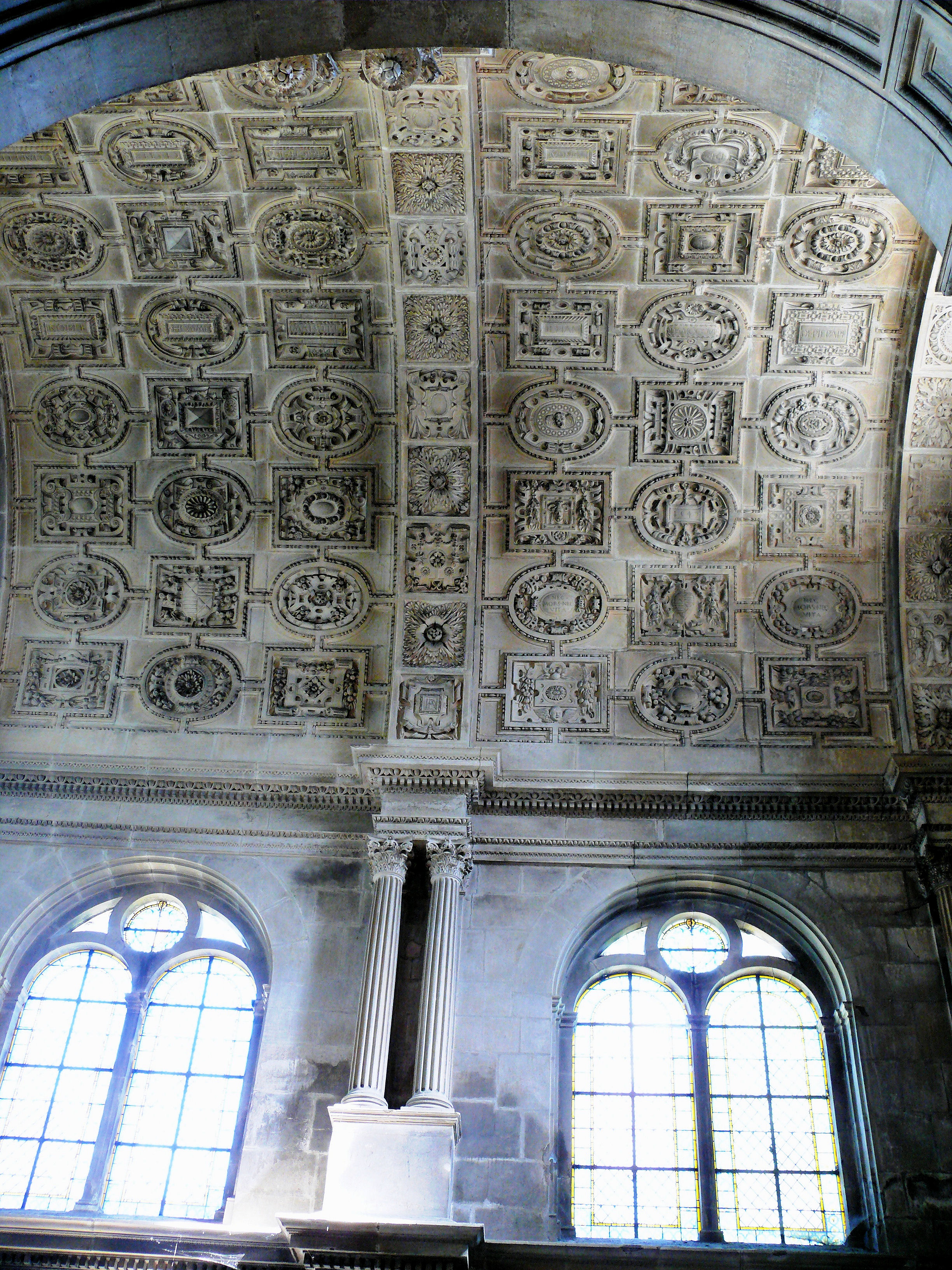
Caissons of the Ceiling of the Chapel of the Holy Cross

The Chapel of the Holy Cross was constructed on the north side of the cathedral between 1547 and 1549, funded by a donation from a chanoine of the cathedral, Jean de Amoncourt. It is considered a particularly accomplished example of French Renaissance architecture. The most distinctive feature is the barrel-vaulted ceiling, decorated with caissons, or sculpted panels, alternating in form from rectangular to oval, each decorated with elaborate designs. The vaults of the chapel are supported by ionic and corninthian columns, while the retable is crowned by composite elements of the different orders. The floor is decorated with faience tiles, made 1551, and restored in the 19th century.

== Art and decoration ==
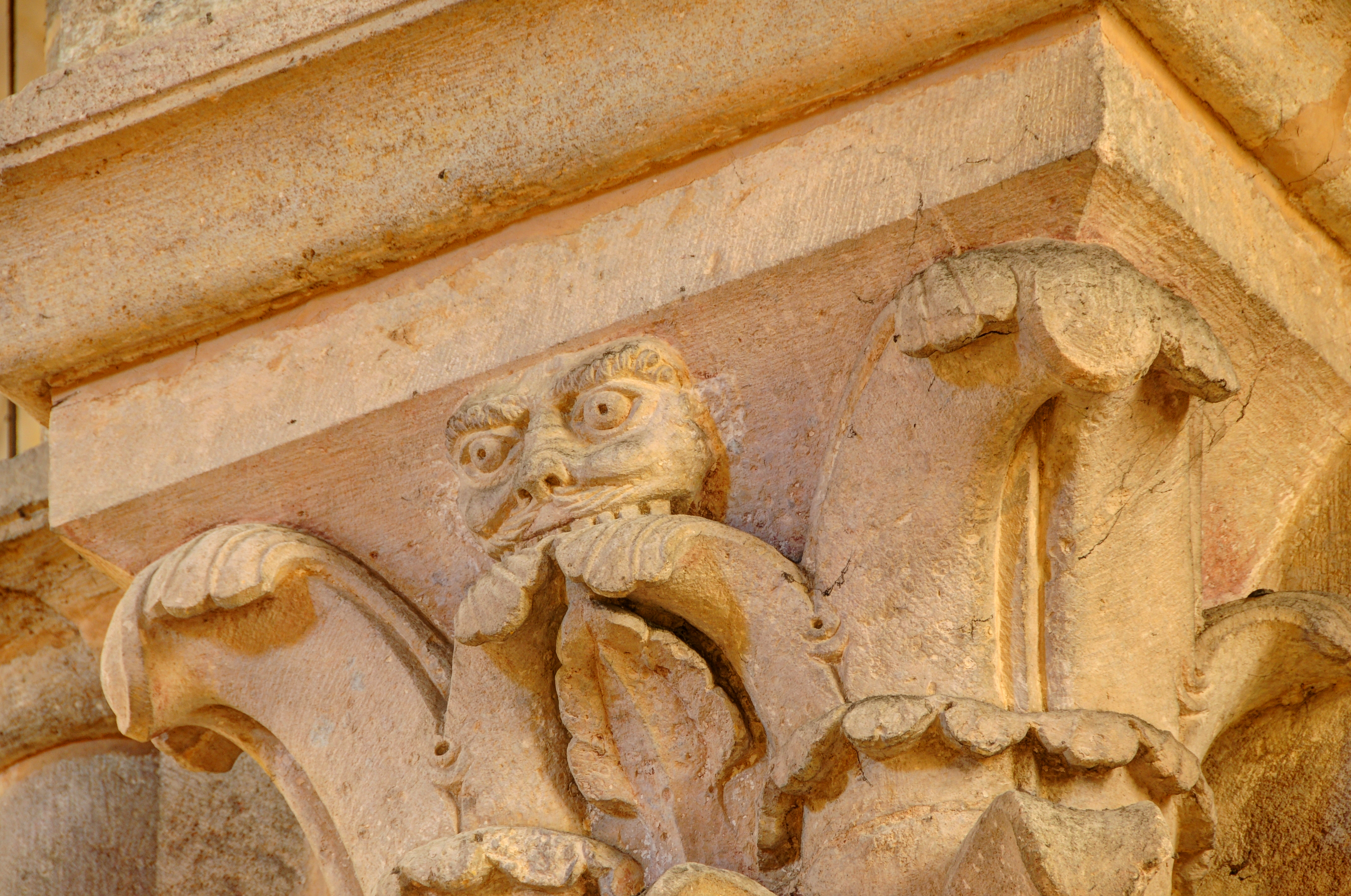
Bas-relief of a monster on the capital of a column

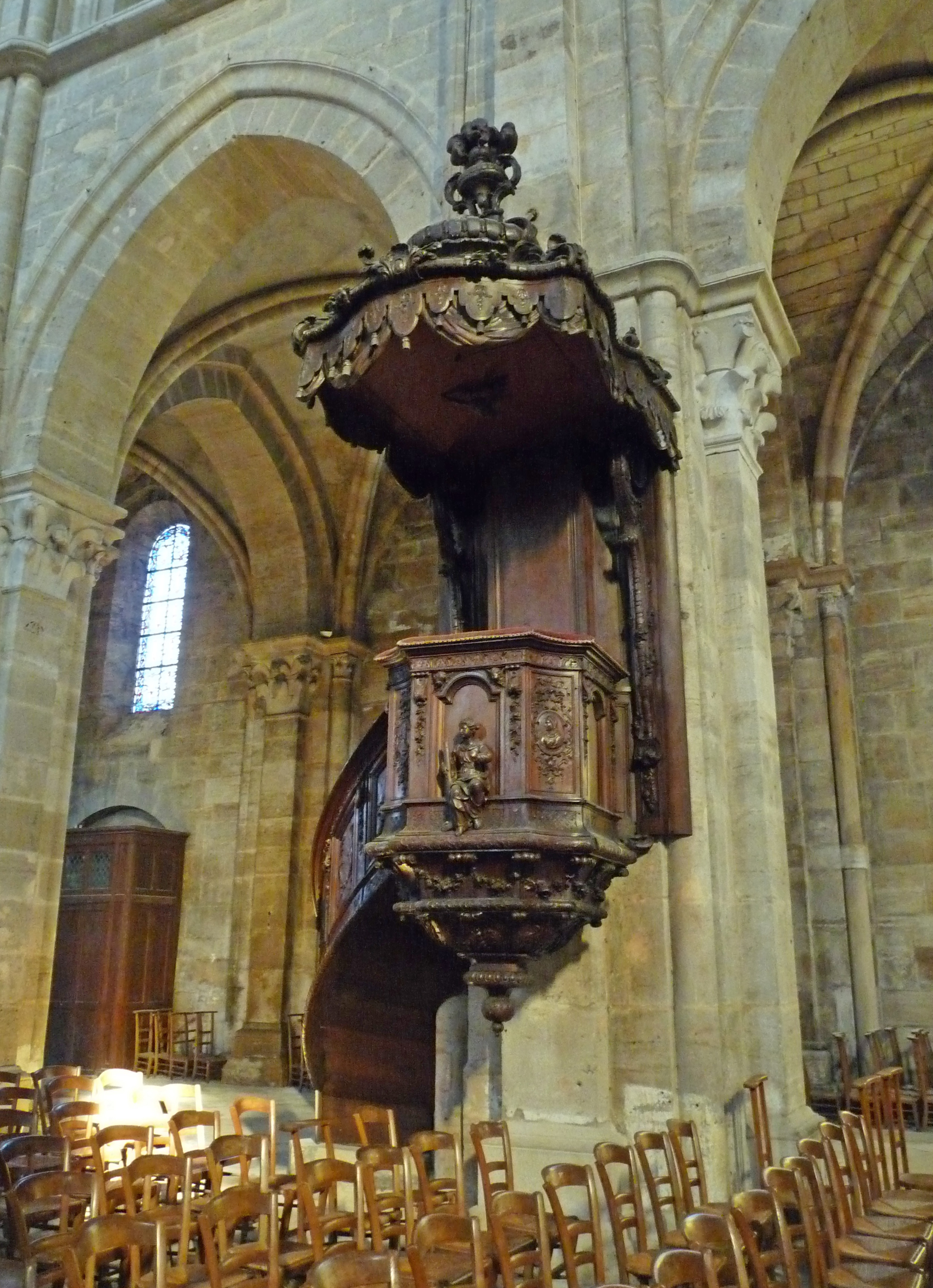
The Pulpit

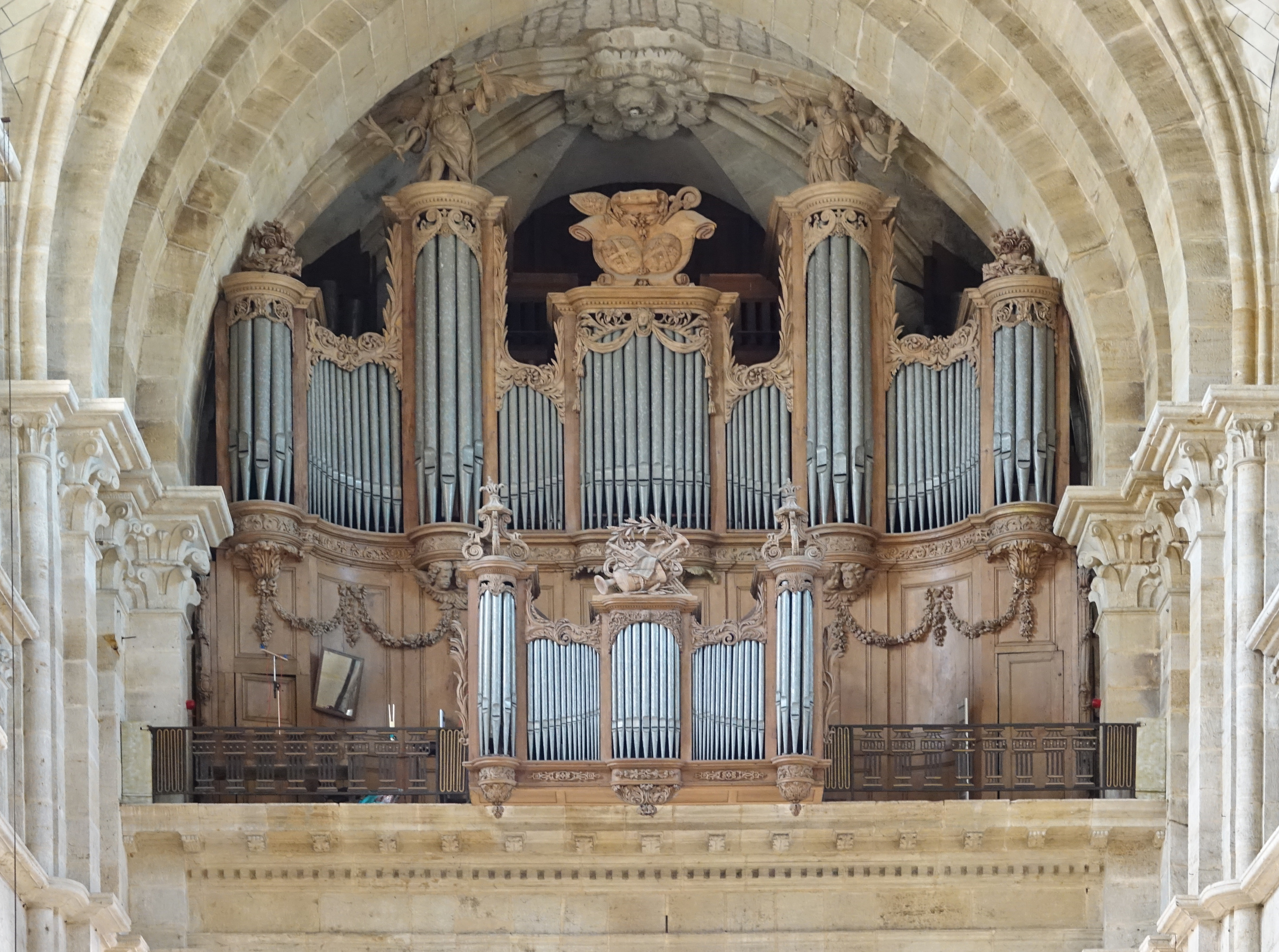
The cathedral organ, originally in Morimond Abbey

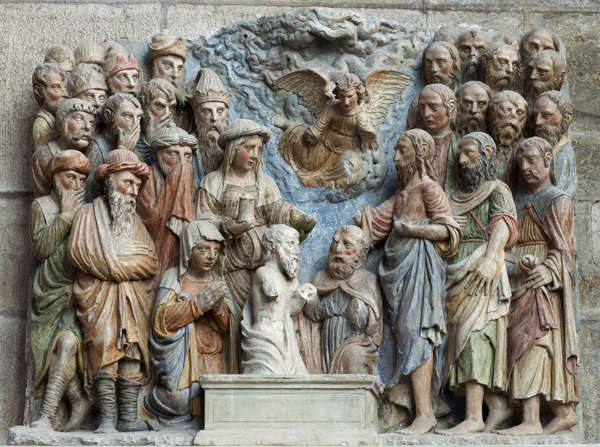
Resurrection of Lazarus (16th century)

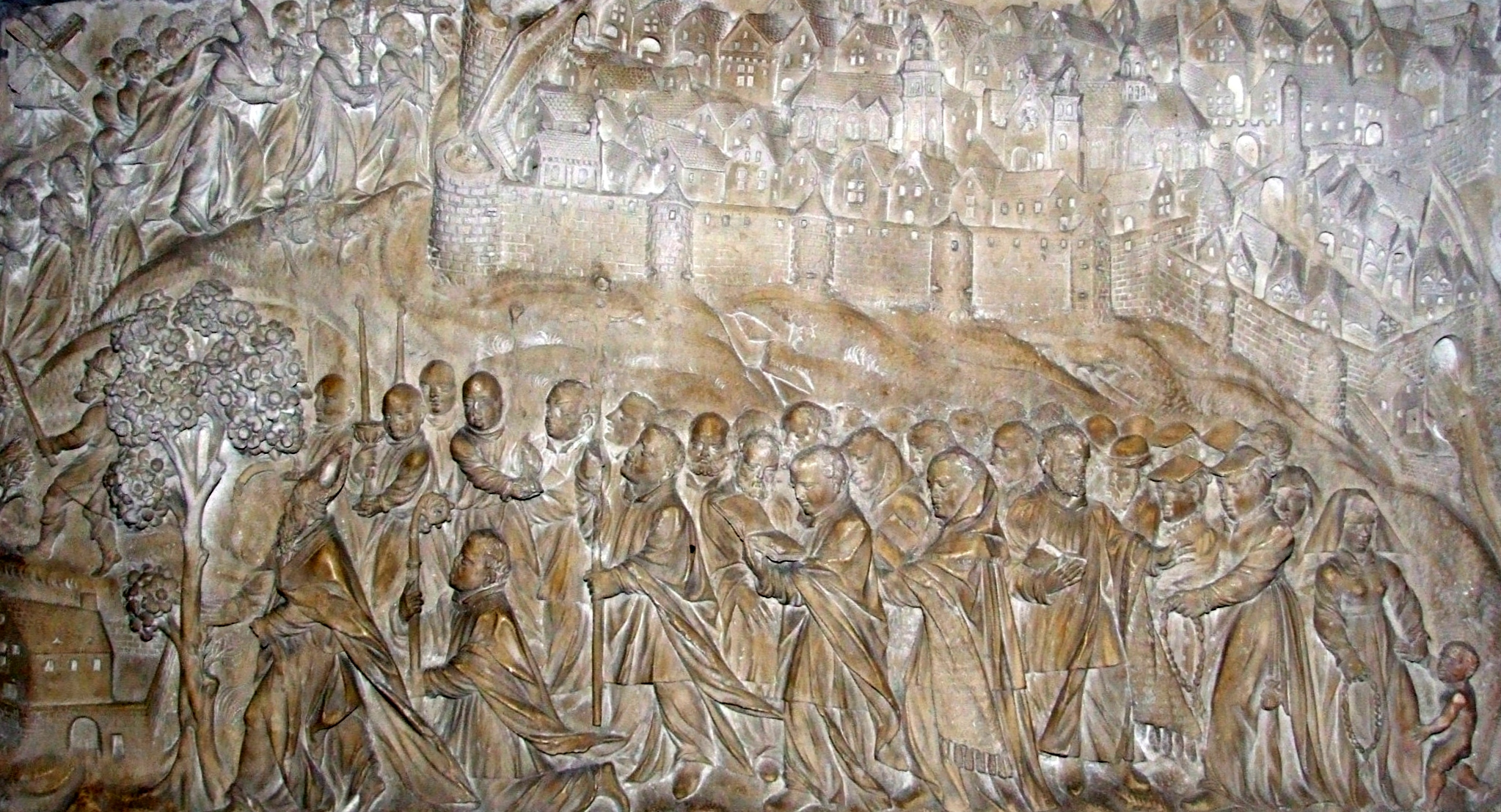
Bas relief, "The Procession" (16th century)

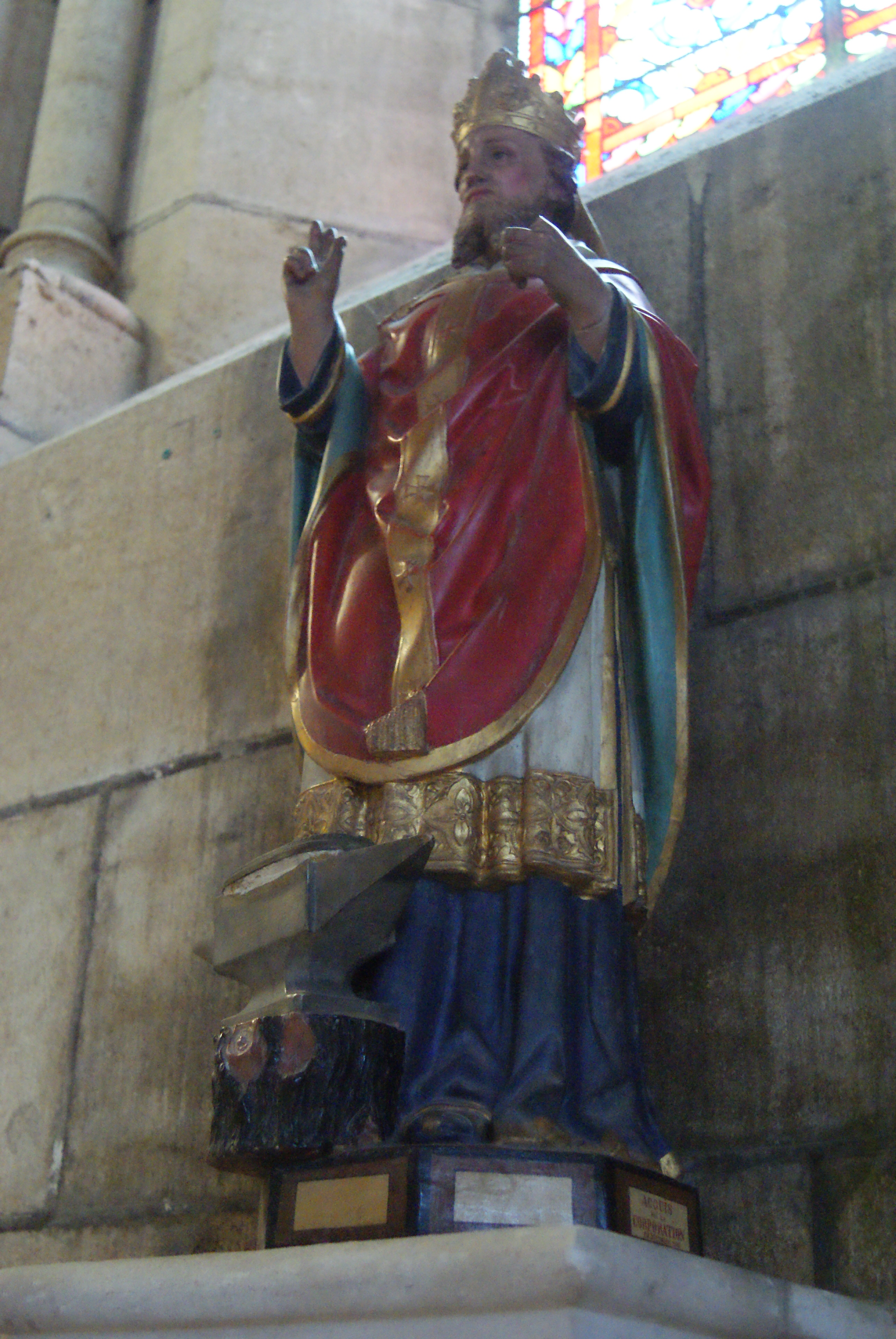
Sculpture of Saint Mammès

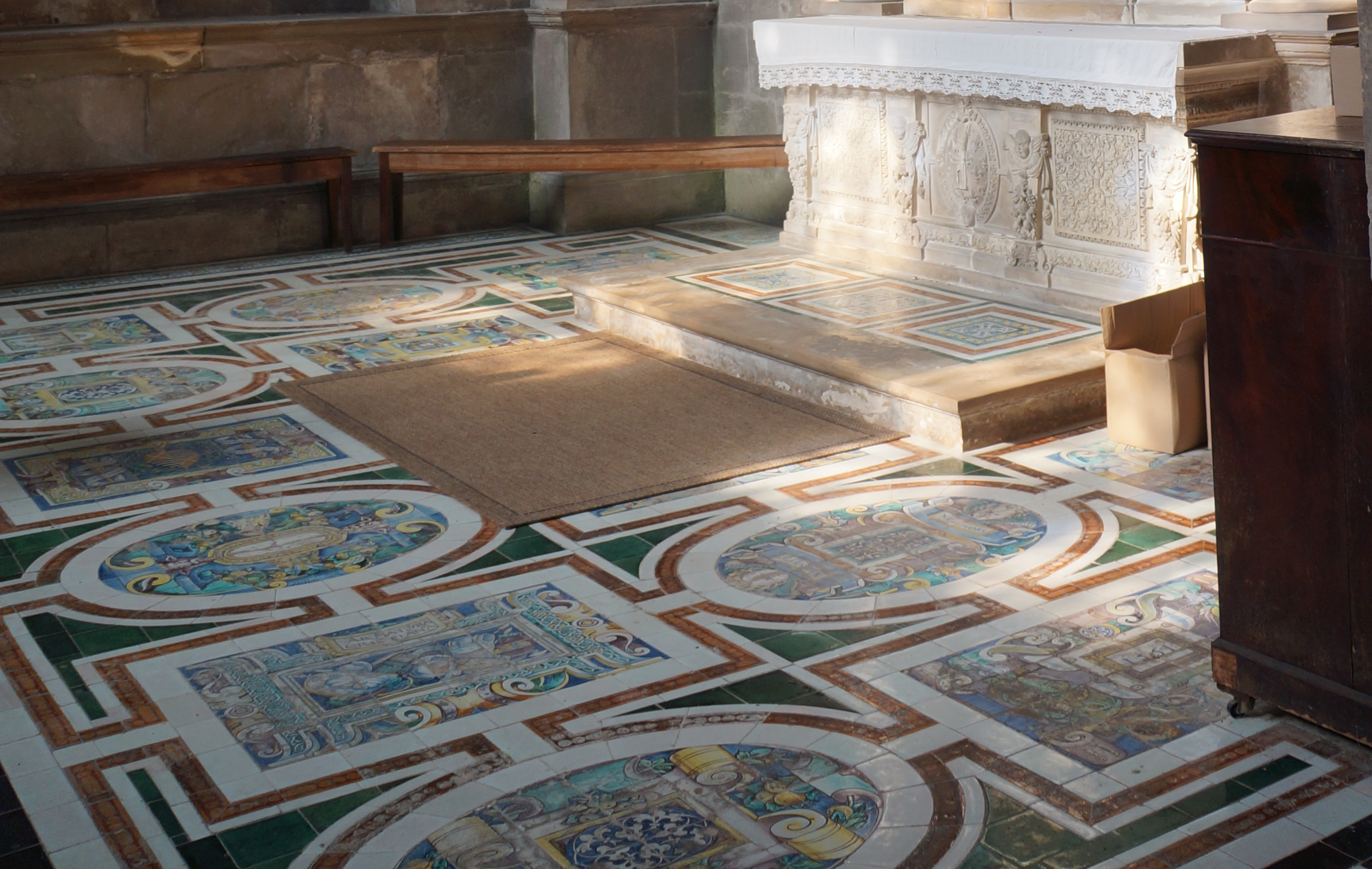
Faience tile floor of the Chapel of Saint Amoncourt (16th century)

A considerable portion of the decorative woodwork, as well as the church organ, was acquired at the beginning of the 19th century, following the destruction of Morimond Abbey during the French Revolution. Another exceptional element of decoration is the 16th century faience tile floor of the Chapel of Amoncourt, which designated an historic landmark.

== Bibliography ==
- Le Guide du Patrimoine en France (in French). Éditions du Patrimoine, Centre des Monuments Nationaux. 2002. ISBN 978-2-85822-760-0.
- Lours, Mathieu (2018). Dictionnaire des Cathédrales (in French). Éditions Jean-Paul Gisserot. ISBN 978-2755-807653.

== See also ==
- List of Gothic Cathedrals in Europe

== External links (in French) ==
- Fiche du ministère de la culture
- Cathédrale Saint-Mammès à Langres - patrimoine-histoire.fr
- Cathédrale Saint-Mammès de Langres at Structurae
- Galerie de photos de la cathédrale de Langres
- Cathédrale Saint-Mammès - Inventaire Général du Patrimoine Culturel
- Langres (Haute-Marne). Cathédrale Saint-Mammès (Archéologie médiévale Année 1990) - Persée
- Location
- Photos
