= Geilo (bishop) =

Geilo (or Geylo, French Gilon) (died 28 June 888) was the Bishop of Langres from 880 until his death. His episcopate coincided mostly with the emperorship of Charles the Fat and after 885 he is a leading ecclesiastical figure at the imperial court. Geilo increased the landholdings and comital rights of the diocese of Langres immensely in his short tenure, a sign of political sagacity. Geilo has been painted as a villain, an ambitious prelate trying to extend his see's temporal authority as far as it could go under the reign of weak Carolingians.

Geilo was the son and namesake of Count Geilo. He was the abbot of Flavigny from 866 until 870, and of Tournus during the last years of the reign of Charles the Bald. In 879, he crowned Boso of Provence in Mantaille; Boso in turn made him Bishop of Langres. He quickly changed sides and supported Carloman II in 880, being confirmed in his diocese, and even staying with the king at the siege of Vienne throughout the year.

When Carloman died in 884, Geilo was instrumental in bringing Charles the Fat to the throne in West Francia. It is likely that he in fact crowned Charles rex in Gallia on 20 May 885 at Grand in his diocese. Geilo even developed a special West Frankish seal for Charles and met him at the Siege of Paris in 885.

On 15 January 887, at the royal palace of Sélestat in Alsace, Geilo received four imperial charters. He was commended for building up his city's walls and rewarded with all the ex officio lands of a count in the city of Langres and its environs. He was also granted the fiscal rights of a count, including that of minting, and the revenues from the markets of Langres and Dijon. The policy of episcopal empowerment in the cities of Burgundy during the 880s was largely a result of increased Viking activity in that area.

On 18 May 887, Geilo attended a provincial church synod at Chalon-sur-Saône whereat the peace of the church was discussed, probably in light of the decline of Charles' health and the rising tide of opposition from Arnulf of Carinthia's quarters. Geilo was subsequently present at the assemblies of Weiblingen, whereat Charles' son Bernard was supposed to be declared heir, and of Kirchen, whereat Louis of Provence was adopted as Charles' son. It is possible that Geilo had escorted Louis and his mother, Ermengard, to Kirchen. The events of Sélestat and Kirchen probably realised a long-sought goal of Charles': to negate the usurpation of Boso. By granting lands probably once held by Boso to Geilo and thus securing Geilo as Boso's de facto successor in northern Provence as well as adopting Louis and thus bringing Boso's heir back into the Carolingian family, Charles succeeded in reestablishing full imperial sovereignty in Provence.

On Charles' death, he supported Guy III of Spoleto for the West Frankish throne, even crowning him at Langres in 888, but Guy's attempt failed and Geilo died later that year.

== Sources ==
- Bautier, R.-H. (1990). "Les diplômes royaux carolingiens pour l'église de Langres et l'origine des droits comtaux de l'éveque". Chartes, sceaux et chancelleries: Études de diplomatique et de sigillographie médiévales. 1. Paris: 209–42.
- Bouchard, Constance Brittain, ed. (1991). The Cartulary of Flavigny, 717–1113. Cambridge, MA: Medieval Academy of America.
- MacLean, Simon (2003). Kingship and Politics in the Late Ninth Century: Charles the Fat and the End of the Carolingian Empire. Cambridge University Press.
- Reuter, Timothy, ed. (1992). The Annals of Fulda. Manchester Medieval Series, Ninth-Century Histories. Vol. II. Manchester University Press. Archived from the original on 2010-02-26.

Catholic Church titles
Preceded by Isaac	Bishop of Langres; 880–888	Succeeded by Argrim
