= Igreja de São Mamede =

Church in Évora, Portugal

Coordinates: 38°34′28″N 7°54′28″W

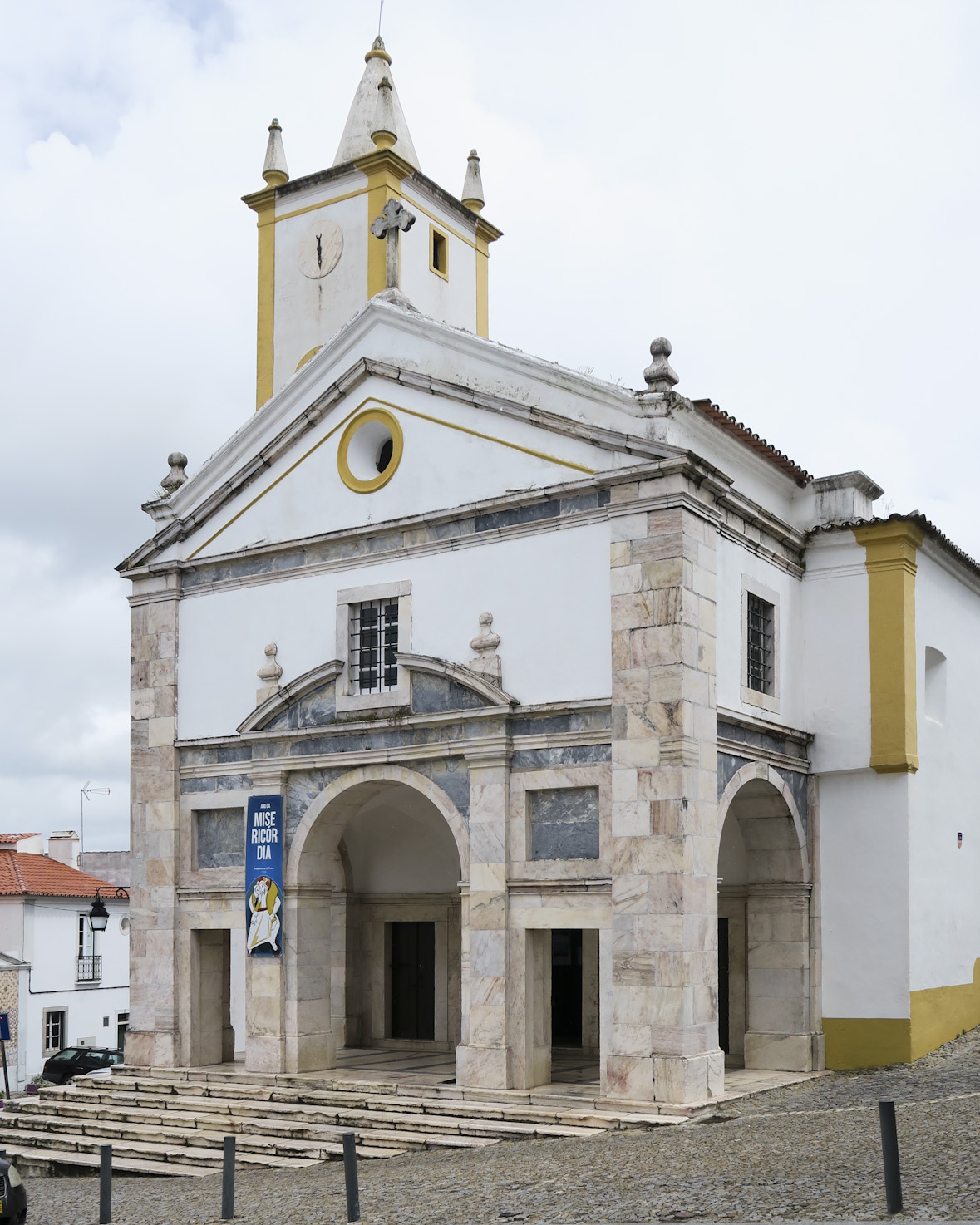
Church of São Mamede, Évora

Igreja de São Mamede is a church building in Évora, Portugal. It is classified as a National Monument.
