= Choiseul =

Choiseul may refer to:

== People ==
- Choiseul family, noble family in France
- César, duc de Choiseul (1602–1675), French marshal and diplomat known as marshal du Plessis-Praslin
- César Gabriel de Choiseul (1712–1785), duc de Praslin, French officer, diplomat and statesman
- Claude Antoine Gabriel, duc de Choiseul-Stainville (1760–1838), French royalist
- Claude de Choiseul (1632–1711), marshal of France in 1693
- Étienne François, duc de Choiseul (1719–1785), French officer, diplomat and statesman
- François Joseph de Choiseul, marquis de Stainville (1700–1770), French diplomat and statesman

== Places ==
- Choiseul, Haute-Marne, a commune in the Haute-Marne département in France
- Choiseul Quarter, a quarter of Saint Lucia, a Caribbean island nation
  - Choiseul, Saint Lucia, the main city of Choiseul Quarter
- Choiseul Island, the largest island of Choiseul Province in the Solomon Islands, named after Étienne François de Choiseul
  - Choiseul Province, a province of Solomon Islands
  - Choiseul Bay, a bay in Choiseul Island
- Choiseul Sound, a strait in the Falkland Islands

== Other uses ==
- Choiseul (surname)
- Choiseul Camp, a concentration camp in Châteaubriant, Brittany, France from 1941 to 1942
- Choiseul constituency, a former constituency in Solomon Islands
- Choiseul languages, a group of Northwest Solomonic languages
- Institut Choiseul for International Politics and Geoeconomics, a French, non-partisan think tank
