= Renard II of Choiseul =

Lord of Choiseul in Champagne

- Lord of Choiseul
- Coat of arms of the House of Choiseul (Azure, a cross or, each canton adorned with eighteen billets of the same.).
- Tenure: Before 1198 - 1239
- Predecessor: Foulques II of Choiseul
- Successor: John I of Choiseul
- Other names: Latin: Renardus de Causeoli
- Born: Around 1175
- Died: 1239
- Noble family: Choiseul family
- Spouses: Clémence of Faucogney; Alix of Dreux
- Father: Foulques II of Choiseul
- Mother: Alix of Vignory

Renard II of Choiseul, also known as Raynard II of Choiseul or Renaud of Choiseul, was the son of Foulques II and Alix of Vignory. He held the title of lord of Choiseul in Champagne during the late 12th and early 13th centuries. The region is located in the current department of Haute-Marne.

He married Clémence of Faucogney as his first wife, the heiress of the lordship of Faucogney in the county of Burgundy, which they both ruled. He took part in the war of the succession of Champagne and supported the claims of his cousin Érard of Brienne against Countess Blanche of Navarre and her son, the future Thibaut IV. He then participated in the Fifth Crusade, where he likely fought during the siege of Damietta alongside another cousin, John of Brienne, the king of Jerusalem.

Upon returning to France, he entered into a prestigious marriage with Alix de Dreux, his second wife, who hailed from Capetian lineage and was the lady of Traves. In 1228, he joined forces with Count Thibaut IV of Champagne in a battle against a coalition led by a half-brother of the king who was dissatisfied with Queen Mother Blanche of Castille's regency.

As a vassal of the Bishop of Langres, he was generous with the clergy throughout his life. He sought to enhance the influence of his house while preserving independence from neighboring powers such as the counts of Burgundy, Champagne, and Bar. He died in 1239 and was laid to rest in the Abbey of Morimond. His eldest son, John I of Choiseul, assumed control of the lordship of Choiseul, while his youngest son, Robert of Choiseul, received the lordship of Traves as part of his wife's dowry.

== Biography ==
=== Origins ===
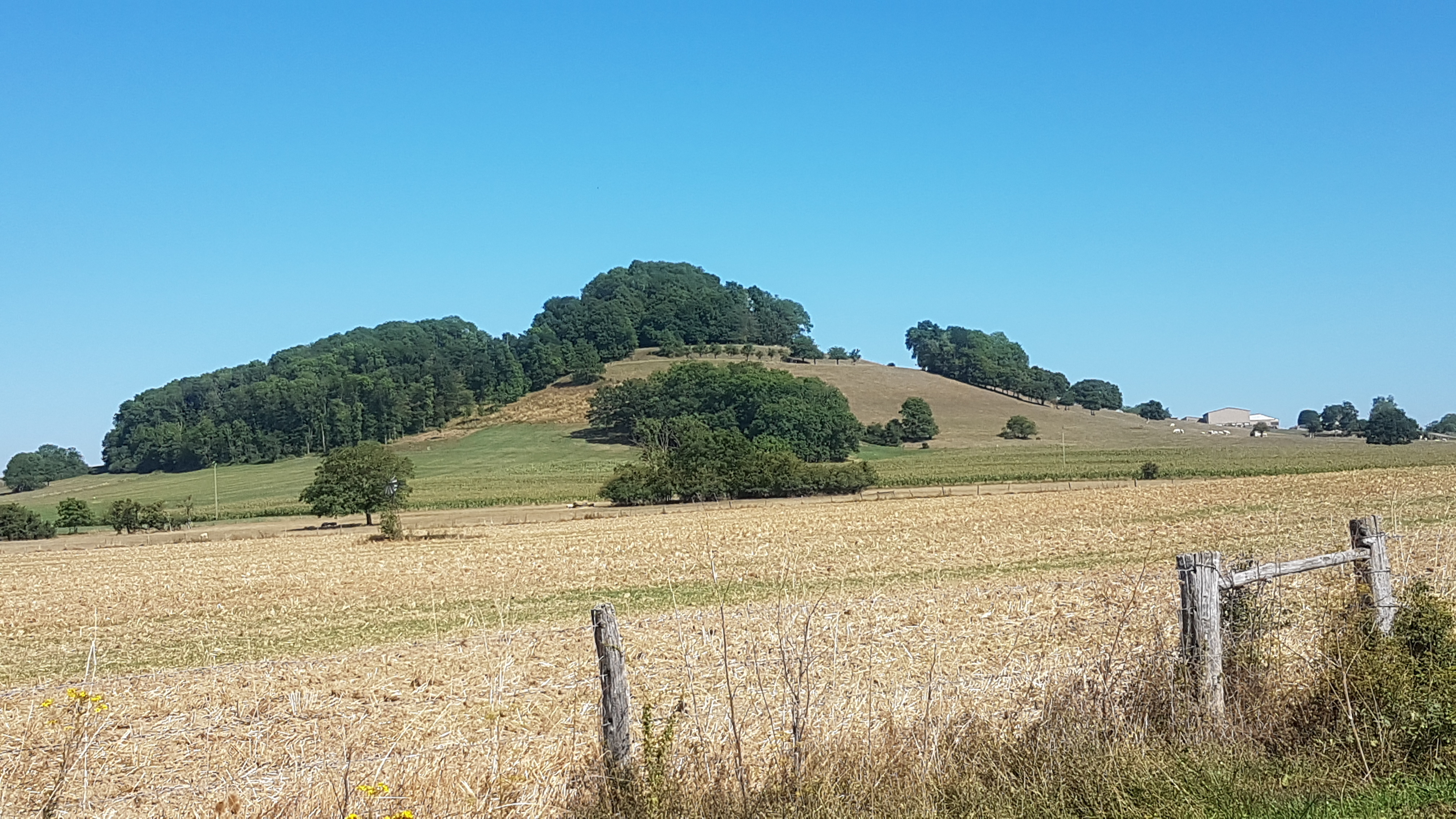
Motte-and-bailey castle, the site of the former Château de Choiseul.

Born around 1175, likely at the castle of Choiseul, Renard was the eldest son and the primary heir of Foulques II of Choiseul and Alix of Vignory. The houses of Choiseul (originating from the division of the county of Bassigny) and Vignory (originating from the division of the county of Bolenois) were prominent vassals of the Bishop of Langres.

Renard is first mentioned in a charter from 1176, where his father donated to the Abbey of Belfays, likely as a gesture of gratitude for the birth of his son. Renard is consistently mentioned alongside his father in various documents over the following decade, indicating his involvement in power matters and his apprenticeship.

=== Participation in the Third Crusade ===
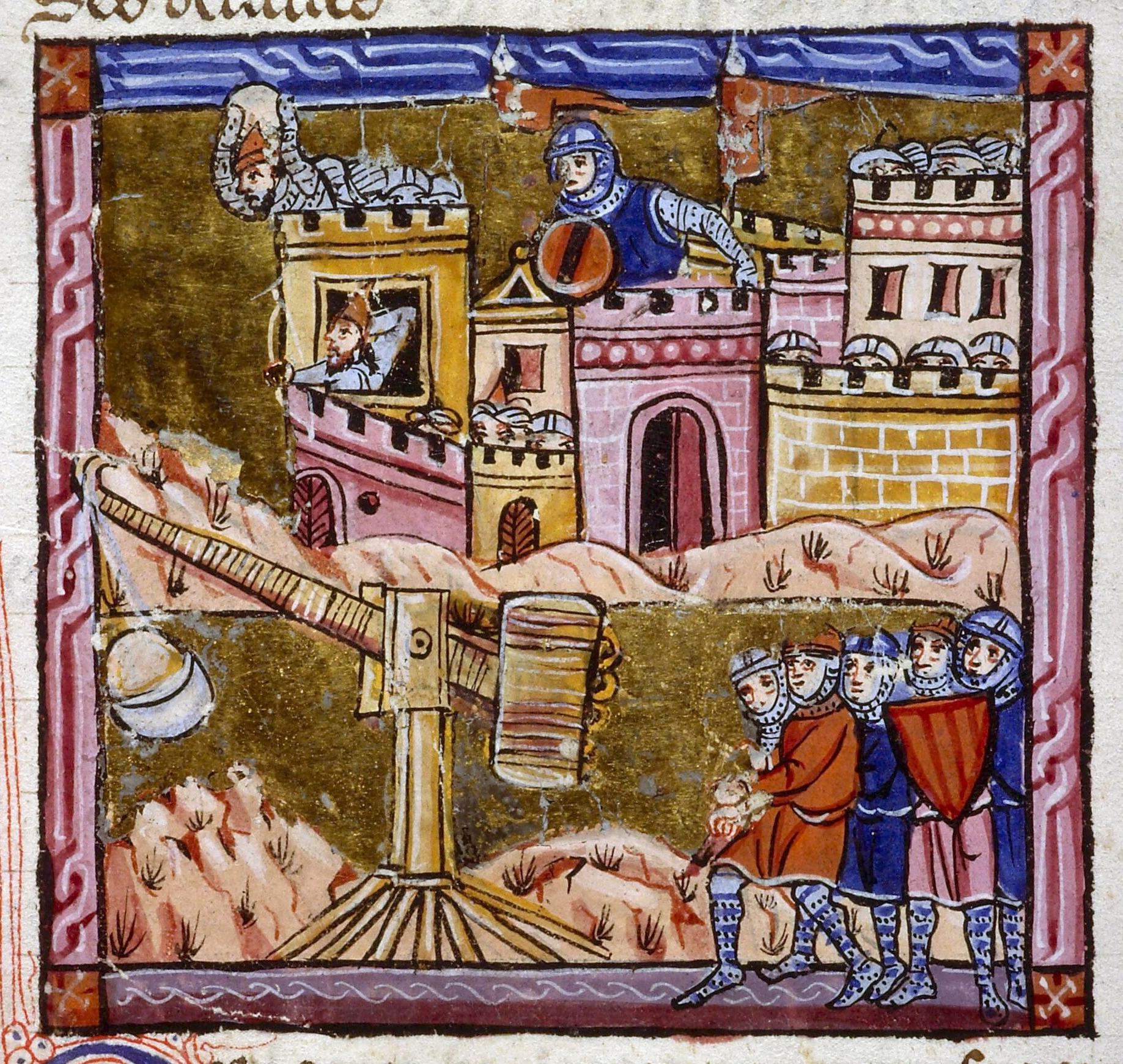
Siege of Acre during the Third Crusade, Bibliothèque Municipale de Lyon.

Some 19th-century historians claim that Renard participated in the Third Crusade and fought at the siege of Acre. (Note: Grassot 1887, p. 408) However, before embarking on the Holy Land, many Crusaders made donations to the clergy to seek divine favor during their journey. There is no charter from Renard confirming such donations or his participation in the crusade. The only document mentioning Renard's presence in Messina in 1190 is a forgery created for establishing the Hall of Crusades at the Palace of Versailles. In this document, Renard vouches for a loan taken out by twenty-one knights, including himself. Historian Gilles Poissonnier suggests that Renard was born in 1175 or 1176, making him around fifteen years old at the time of the supposed crusade.

=== First marriage and inheritance of the Lordship of Faucogney ===
Before 1192, at the age of about 16, he married Clémence of Faucogney, (Note: Faget de Casteljau 1970, p. 147) the daughter of Aymon II of Faucogney, the lord of Faucogney, (Note: The Faucogney family owned the rights to the fairs of Bar-sur-Aube, which may explain the close relationship between these two families.) who had died after 1174. The lordship of Faucogney was then held by his eldest son, Aymon, who died around 1205 without marrying or having children, thus passing the family estate to his sister, Clémence, (Note: Clémence of Faucogney had a sister named Béatrice, who is married to Hugues de Rougemont. Béatrice was the heiress of Clémence if Clémence had no children.) and subsequently to her husband.

Renard and Clémence jointly managed the lands of Faucogney, dividing their time between Choiseul and Faucogney until 1207 when Renard's mother, Alix of Vignory, died. This event prompted him to establish his presence in Bassigny. However, around 1217, Clémence de Faucogney died without an heir, leading Renard to relinquish control of the lordship of Faucogney to his wife's family. The title then passed to Aymon III of Faucogney, the son of Béatrice of Faucogney, Clémence's sister, and Hugues of Rougemeont.

=== Inheritance of the Lordship of Choiseul ===
Shortly before 1198, Renard inherited the lordship of Choiseul upon his father Foulques' death. He initially shared management of the estate with his mother Alix of Vignory, who had usufruct over the property, possibly as part of her dower. By 1203, Renard was the sole ruler of his domains, even though his mother was still alive. It is possible that she had relinquished her dower rights in favor of her eldest son.

Renard then sought to consolidate the power of his house and preserve his autonomy. He was the first in his lineage to employ personal scribes from the start of his rule, enabling him to break free from episcopal oversight while remaining a vassal of the Bishop of Langres.

As the lord of Choiseul, he was responsible for providing dowries for his sisters and arranging marriages to form alliances with other noble houses. Helvide, the eldest, married Simon of Beaujeu, while the youngest, Ide, married Pierre of Mereville. It is likely that the youngest sister, Alix, either became a nun or died at a young age.

=== Vassalage to the Counts of Champagne, Burgundy, and Bar ===
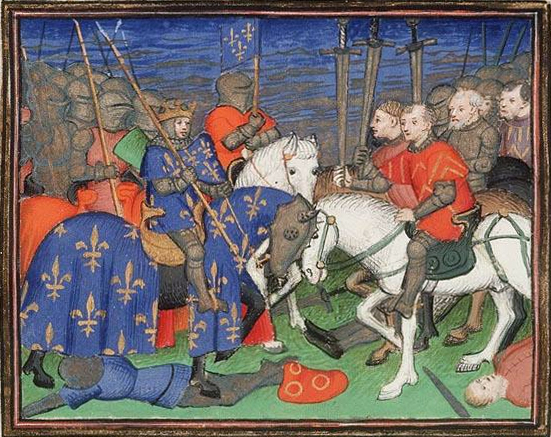
Philip Augustus at the Battle of Bouvines, in Vincent de Beauvais, Le Miroir Historial (vol. IV).

Renard was already a vassal of the Count of Burgundy for Faucogney and his holdings in Bourbonne. However, Choiseul was an independent fief that only paid homage to the Bishop of Langres, despite being a target of interest for its neighbors, the counties of Bar and Champagne.

In 1210, Renard declared himself a vassal of the Countess of Champagne, Blanche of Navarre, in two charters. It was the first time he acknowledged his vassalage for rents he owned on the fairs of Bar-sur-Aube and Provins. Although it did not greatly affect Renard, it helped fulfill the expansionist ambitions of the Champenois and provided him with protection against other rivals.

In 1214, he was one of the knight bannerets who gathered under the banner of the Count of Champagne in response to the call of the King of France, Philip Augustus. He likely took part in the Battle of Bouvines, although there is no documented evidence of his presence.

However, Renard always maintained good relations with his other neighbor, the Count of Bar, especially since the latter's wife was the sister of his second wife. In 1209, he became the guardian of the land of Apremont in the absence of its legitimate owner, who had gone on a crusade. (Note: Faget de Casteljau 1970, p. 148) In November 1214, upon the death of Count of Bar Theobald I, Renard stood surety for the new count Henri of Bar to his suzerain, the Duke of Lorraine Theobald I. These two acts demonstrate the importance of the Lord of Choiseul vis-à-vis his neighbors. In 1224, he also declared himself a vassal of the Count of Bar, his brother-in-law, for Colombey and his possessions in Vrécourt.

=== War of the Succession of Champagne ===
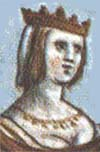
Countess Blanche of Navarre.

During the war of the succession of Champagne, he sided with his cousin Érard of Brienne (Note: Arbois de Jubainville 1865, pp. 128–129) and his wife Philippa of Champagne against Countess Blanche of Navarre and her son Theobald. (Note: Grassot 1887, p. 409) (Note: Faget de Casteljau 1970, p. 149)

In 1217, Pope Honorius III urged Érard of Brienne and his supporters, including Renard, to reconcile with Blanche of Navarre or face excommunication. (Note: Arbois de Jubainville 1865, p. 149) The peace agreement lasted from February 24 to April 22. (Note: Arbois de Jubainville 1865, p. 154) However, hostilities resumed, leading Pope Honorius III to excommunicate Érard of Brienne and his allies, including Renard. (Note: Arbois de Jubainville 1865, p. 152)

In June 1218, Blanche of Navarre and the Duke of Burgundy, Odo III, marched to attack the city of Nancy because the Duke of Lorraine was a strong supporter of Érard of Brienne. They successively attacked the castles of Châteauvillain, Clefmont, and Joinville, with Renard likely participating in these battles. (Note: Arbois de Jubainville 1865, p. 159) In July 1218, as Érard's supporters dwindled, the remaining members gathered in his castle of Faucogney. Renard then stood surety for Érard of Brienne to observe the truce imposed on him. (Note: Arbois de Jubainville 1865, pp. 161–162)

=== Participation in the Fifth Crusade ===
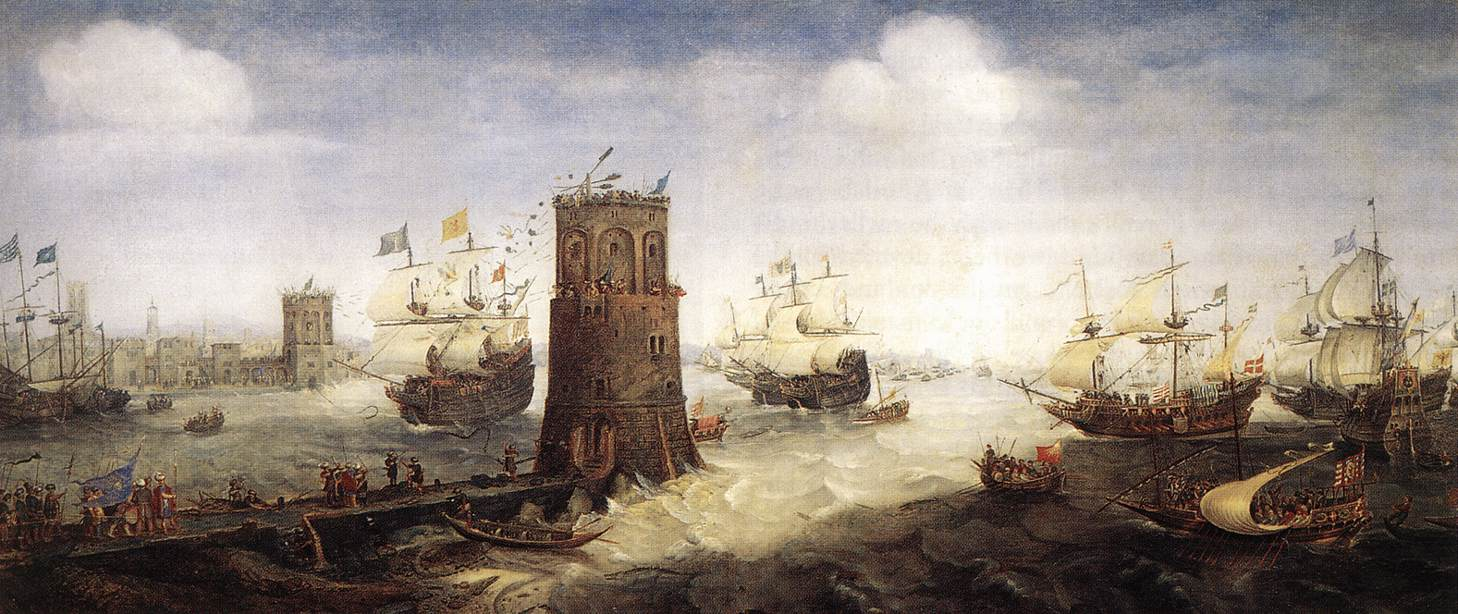
Ship breaking the Damietta chain during the Fifth Crusade. History painting by Cornelis Claesz van Wieringen, Frans Hals Museum, circa 1625.

In 1218, he participated in the Fifth Crusade and likely took part in the siege of Damietta under the command of his cousin, the King of Jerusalem, John of Brienne.

A charter from 1219 mentions Renard's presence in Damietta, but historians Henri of Faget of Casteljau and Gilles Poissonnier do not refer to Renard's participation in this crusade in their studies on the Choiseul family. Hence, it is plausible that Renard did not travel to the Holy Land.

Before his departure, his reputation did not seem tarnished by his participation in the war of the succession of Champagne. He was at the court of the Bishop of Verdun, where he witnessed the lord of Cons acquiring property. Later, he was at the court of the Count of Bar, where he acted as surety with the Count of Vaudémont for an agreement between the Count of Chiny and Guillaume and Richard of Chauvency.

=== Second marriage and struggle for obtaining Salins ===
Around 1220, at the age of about 45 and as a widower, Renard married Alix of Dreux, the widow of Gaucher IV of Mâcon (lord of Salins) and the daughter of Robert II of Dreux, Count of Dreux, and Yolande of Coucy. This marriage was significant for the house of Choiseul as Alix of Dreux was a descendant of King Louis VI of the Franks, making her of Capetian origin. Alix of Dreux's dowry included the castle of Bracon in Franche-Comté and likely rights over the land of Salins. Renard pledged his castle of Choiseul and half of his land as part of this dowry. The efforts to reclaim his wife's property proved costly for Renard, leading him to borrow 250 pounds from Gilebert of Chaumont in 1223, a wealthy bourgeois, and offering the village of Chauffourt as collateral for the loan repayment. (Note: Arbois de Jubainville 1865, p. 551)

In 1222, Renard welcomed his firstborn and heir, John. Before this, his only heir was his younger brother, Barthélemy of Choiseul, with whom he was involved in many of his endeavors. However, after Jean's birth, Barthélemy appeared to retreat to his lands in Vrécourt.

In 1225, Renard and his wife went to the castle of Bracon to claim their property. However, they were met with a cold reception and were unable to access their portion of the inheritance from Gaucher IV of Mâcon, who was Alix of Dreux's first husband. This was likely due to interference from Marguerite of Salins, the eldest daughter of Gaucher IV of Mâcon, and his first wife Mathilde of Bourbon. After spending several months at Bracon without any progress, (Note: Faget de Casteljau 1970, p. 150) they decided to sell their share of the inheritance to the Duchess of Burgundy and returned to Bassigny. The issue was finally resolved in 1237 when the Count of Chalon granted them the lordship of Traves, the lands of Scey-sur-Saône, and Frotey.

=== Raid with the Count of Champagne ===
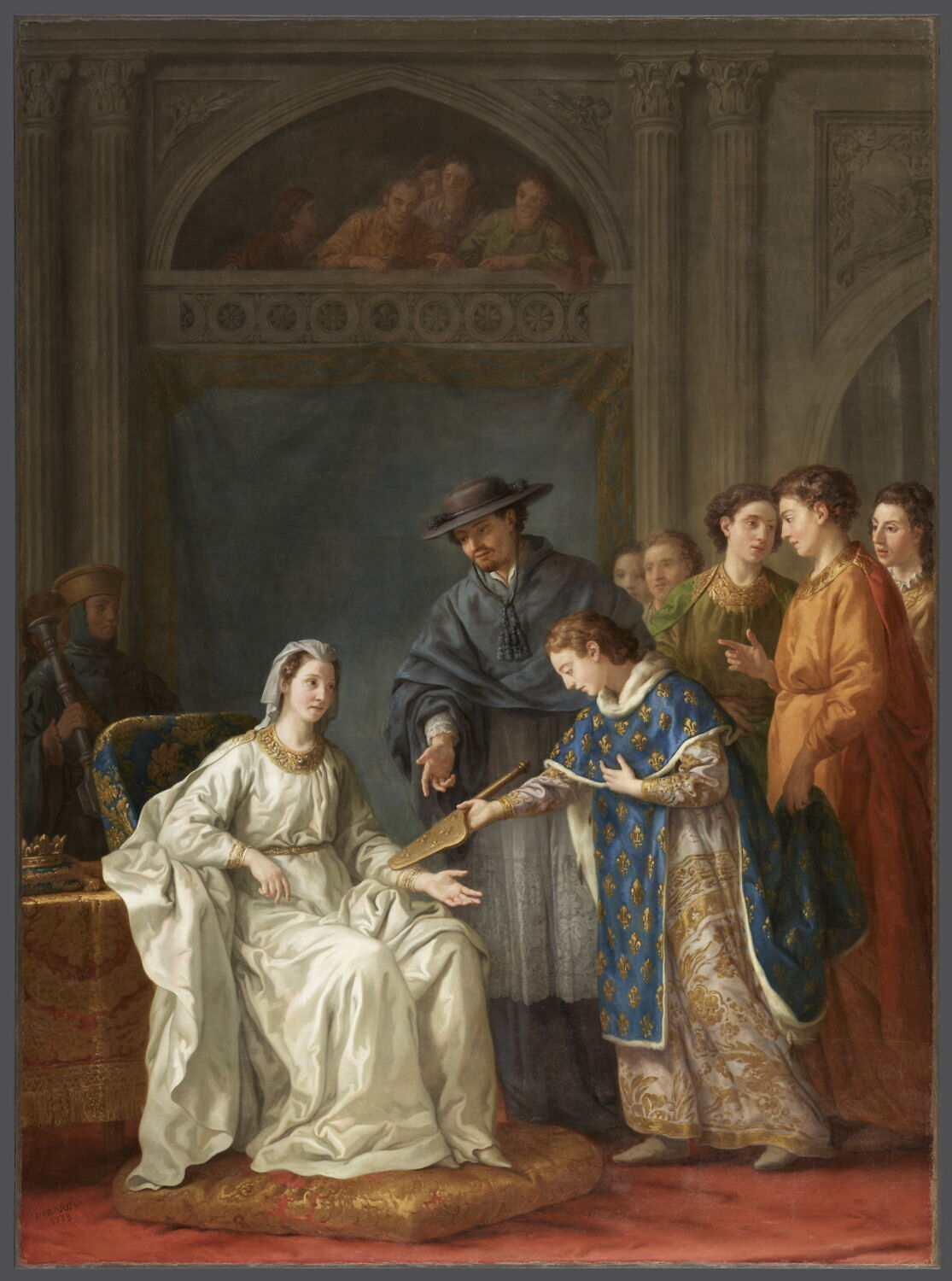
Saint Louis Handing Over the Regency to His Mother by Joseph-Marie Vien, 1773

In 1228, a league led by Philip, the king's half-brother, Hugh X of Lusignan, and the Duke of Brittany Pierre Mauclerc, dissatisfied with the regency of Blanche of Castille, considered abducting the 14-year-old King Louis IX. (Note: Arbois de Jubainville 1865, pp. 217–218) However, Count of Champagne Theobald, loyal to Queen Mother Blanche of Castille, raised an army of 300 horsemen, including Renard, to defend the young king.

Pierre Mauclerc is Renard's brother-in-law, indicating that Renard decided to stay faithful to the Count of Champagne and the King of the Franks by fighting against his wife's brother.

=== Testament and death ===
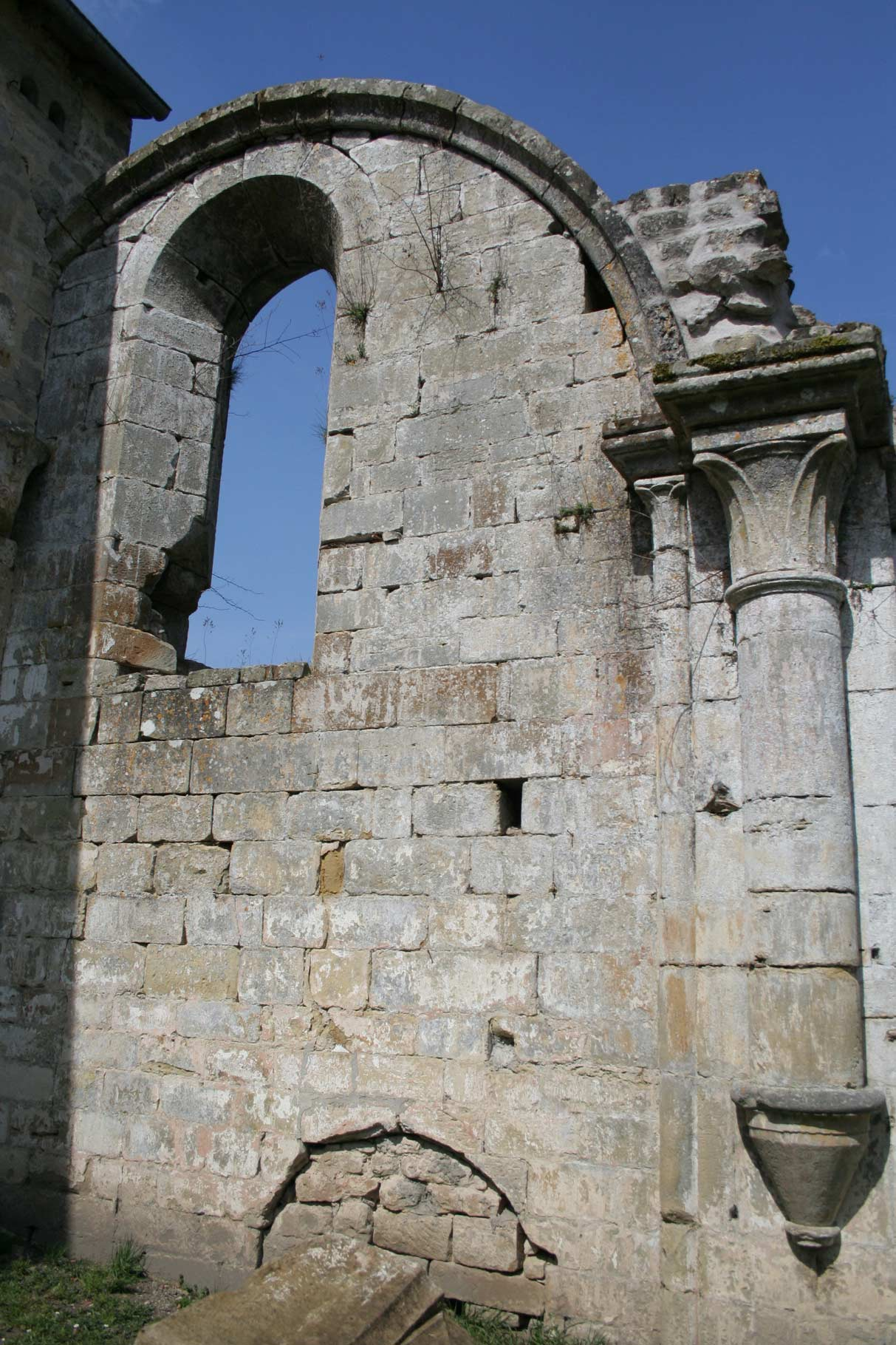
Remains of the Morimond abbey church.

In February 1239, sensing his death, he drafted his will. (Note: Faget de Casteljau 1970, p. 152) He first donated to the Morimond Abbey, followed by another donation to the Abbey of Belfays in March. He likely died shortly after at around the age of 65 and was laid to rest alongside his ancestors in the Morimond Abbey.

He was succeeded by his eldest son, John I, who was only about fifteen years old at the time. His widow, Alix of Dreux, exercised power until Jean's emancipation in December 1246. The lordship of Traves, which belonged to his wife, passed to his youngest son, Robert of Choiseul. His second son, Renard, entered the church and became treasurer of Reims. Renard, who had children late in life, could not marry them off or provide dowries for his two daughters, Yolande and Agnès.

== Politics and administration ==
=== Vassalage ===
The lordship of Choiseul was independent, although it paid homage to the Bishop of Langres. It served as the central authority for several other lordships, such as Aigremont, Bourbonne, and Traves. However, his holdings in Bourbonne and Faucogney, he was a vassal of the Count of Burgundy.

In 1210, Renard, who received several rents from the domain of the Counts of Champagne, acknowledged himself as a vassal of the counts for the property he held from them. Subsequently, in 1224, he also pledged vassalage to the Count of Bar, his brother-in-law, for Colombey and his possessions in Vrécourt. This arrangement placed Renard under the protection of the three neighboring counties, preventing any of them from attempting to seize Choiseul without facing potential retaliation from the other two.

=== Acquisition of the Lordship of Laferté-sur-Amance ===
Following the expansionist advances of the Counts of Champagne in Bassigny, Renard sought to consolidate and extend his influence in this region.

In 1220, he secured recognition from Guy of Vignory, the lord of Laferté-sur-Amance and son of Gautier I, the lord of Vignory and nephew of his mother Alix of Vignory, as his pledge of faith and homage, except allegiance to the lord of Vignory. He also gained the right to hold the lordship directly from the lord of Choiseul if the lord of Vignory died without a male heir. Before this, the lordship had been under the control of the lord of Clefmont, who had become a vassal of the Count of Champagne due to the war of the succession of Champagne. In 1234, he further negotiated with the lord of Vignory to become his direct vassal for Laferté-sur-Amance. However, he likely had to make concessions for this arrangement.

=== Relations with the clergy ===
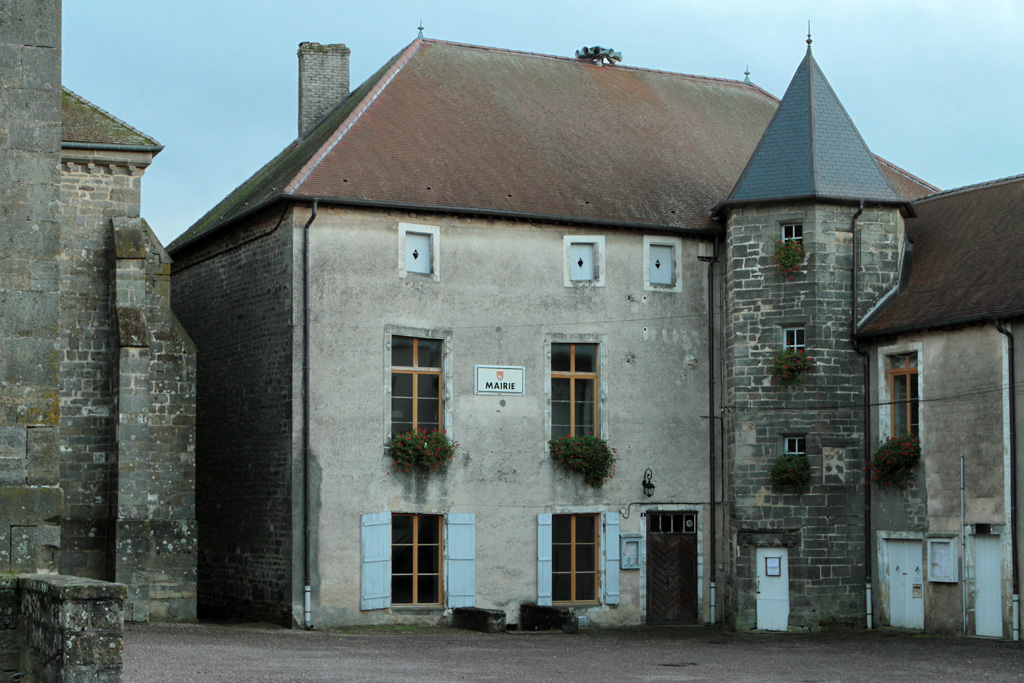
Remains of the Varennes priory.

Unlike his father Foulques, who always had strained relations with the clergy in general and the Morimond Abbey in particular, Renard maintained positive relationships with neighboring abbeys.

He was generous to the Morimond Abbey and the priory of Varennes, of which he was the advocate. (Note: This office of advocate is hereditary, and Renard holds it as a descendant of the early Choiseul and Aigremont and the heir of the new lineage.) He also showed generosity to the Luxeuil Abbey during his time at Faucogney, as well as to the Abbey of Vaux-la-Douce, Val des Écoliers, Belfays, Faverney, and Bithaine, and to the templars of the commandery of Robécourt. In 1215, at the request of the Luxeuil Abbey, he, along with the brothers Guillaume and Richard d'Auxelles, founded the priory of Saint-Urbain of Saulx. However, this priory did not last long, as Renard later donated its possessions to the Bithaine Abbey.

Renard's generosity was sometimes perceived as collaboration with the monks. For instance, he allocated a third of the new crops to the priory of Varennes in exchange for their assistance in clearing the forest for new agricultural areas, leading to the settlement of new peasants and increased tax revenue. Similarly, he shared the revenues from the fairs of Choiseul with the Morimond Abbey, hoping to foster the growth of the Cistercian abbey, which drew visitors from across Europe. (Note: However, these donations would become the subject of disputes between Renard's descendants and the Abbey of Morimond for over a century.)

=== Reputation and integrity ===
Renard must have enjoyed great integrity among his peers, as he is mentioned as a witness or guarantor in many deeds. In 1209, he was in Lorraine where he became the guardian of the land of Apremont while its owner was on a crusade. In 1214, after the death of Count Theobald I of Bar, Renard stood surety for the new Count Henri of Bar to the suzerain of the latter, Duke Theobald I of Lorraine.

In 1220, he attended the court of the Duchess of Burgundy, Alix of Vergy, where he witnessed her promise to uphold the privileges of the commune of Dijon.

In 1236, he took part in the signing of the marriage contract between his nephew John of Brittany and Blanche of Champagne, the daughter of Count Theobald I, at Château-Thierry.

=== Arts and letters ===
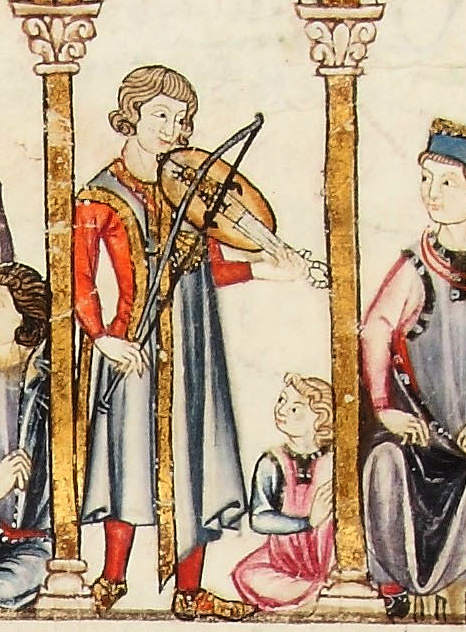
A fiddle player, illuminated in the Cantigas de Santa Maria, 13th century.

Renard was a patron of troubadours on his lands. Chardin of Croisilles, who had previously been in the company of Count Érard II of Brienne, was warmly welcomed and composed a few verses in his honor: (Note: Arbois de Jubainville 1865, p. 658)

To Choiseul go, song, with great cheer,

And tell Renaud that every day, immeasurably,

I love him loyally and with a whole heart,

For praise and honor will greatly reward him.

However, another troubadour, whose name has not been recorded in history and is known as the troubadour of Choiseul, has yet to receive a warm reception. He mocked the ladies of Choiseul and Châteauvillain, accusing them of being spendthrifts, and criticized the lords for not welcoming troubadours generously. He is believed to have written the following verses:

Now I tell you, Choiseul,

Is not worth two eggs,

Which used to be worth to me,

Soon came worms.

However, the dating of this song is inaccurate, and the Lord of Choiseul referred to in the song may be John I, the son and successor of Renard.

== Historical confusion ==
Some 19th-century historians have included two characters named Renard in the genealogy of the house of Choiseul. According to their accounts, Renard II, who reportedly died around 1219, had a son named Renard III with Clémence of Faucogney. Renard III then married Alix of Dreux and had five children, thus continuing the lineage of this family.

However, there is a mistake in this assertion as a charter from 1236 mentions Renard, the lord of Choiseul and the son of Foulques of Choiseul. Renard II and Renard III are likely the same person, making the genealogy mentioned above accurate. This also explains why the heirs of Renard II are not the lords of Faucogney. (Note: Faget de Casteljau 1970, p. 151)

== See also ==
- County of Champagne
- Choiseul family
- Fifth Crusade
