= Plessis =

Plessis (Afrikaans: du Plessis) Plessy, and de Plessis are related surnames of French origin, may refer to:

A plessis meant a fence made of interwoven branches in Old French.

== French people ==
- Alphonse-Louis du Plessis de Richelieu (1582–1653), French bishop
- Armand-Emmanuel de Vignerot du Plessis, Duc de Richelieu (1766–1822), French statesman
- Armand-Jean du Plessis, better known as Cardinal Richelieu (1585–1642), French statesman and cardinal
- Caesar, duc de Choiseul (1602–1675), Marshal of France, born Cæsar Choiseul du Plessis-Praslin
- Chevalier du Plessis (fl. 1660s), French pirate
- Constant Plessis (1890–1930), French First World War flying ace
- Damien Plessis (born 1988), French footballer
- Frédéric Plessis (1851–1942), French Latinist
- Gilbert de Choiseul du Plessis-Praslin (1613–1689), French bishop
- Guillaume Plessis (born 1985), French footballer from Réunion
- Jacques de Rougé du Plessis-Bellière, French general
- Jean du Plessis d'Ossonville (died 1635), French governor of Guadeloupe
- Philippe du Plessis (1165–1209), French knight and 13th Grand Master of the Knights Templar
- Philippe de Mornay (1549–1623), French Protestant writer, also known as Mornay Du Plessis
- Suzanne du Plessis-Bellière (1605–1705), wife of Jacques and political opponent of Louis XIV
- Thomas-Antoine de Mauduit du Plessis (1753–1791), French officer who fought in the American Revolutionary War

== Afrikaners ==
=== Sports ===
- Bismarck du Plessis, and Jannie du Plessis, brothers and South African rugby players
- Carel du Plessis (born 1960), former South African rugby union
- Charl du Plessis (born 1987), former South African rugby union
- Corné du Plessis (born 1978), South African sprinter
- Daniël du Plessis (born 1995), South African rugby union player
- Dean du Plessis, Zimbabwean cricket commentator
- Desiré du Plessis (born 1965), South African former track and field athlete
- Dricus du Plessis (born 1994), South African mixed martial artist
- Faf du Plessis (born 1984), South African cricketer
- Felix du Plessis (1919–1978), former South African rugby union player
- Gary du Plessis (1974–2006), Zimbabwean cricketer
- Hans du Plessis, South African rugby league player
- Hennie du Plessis (born 1996), South African golfer
- Jacques du Plessis (born 1993), South African rugby union player
- Jean du Plessis (born 1998), South African cricketer
- Lilian du Plessis (born 1992), South African field hockey player
- Mark Du Plessis (born 1961), horse racing jockey
- Marthinus du Plessis (born 1932), South African pentathlete, 1956 Summer Olympics
- Morne du Plessis (born 1949), South African rugby union player and captain
- Paul du Plessis, legal historian
- Petrus du Plessis (born 1981), professional rugby player for London Irish
- Renate du Plessis (born 1981), South African competitive swimmer
- Tabbie du Plessis (born 1992), South African rugby union player
- Tinus du Plessis (born 1984), Namibian rugby player
- Wade du Plessis (born 1967), South African association football player

=== Arts and entertainment ===
- Christian du Plessis (born 1944), South African baritone
- Hubert du Plessis (1922 – 2011), South African composer, pianist, and professor of music
- Juanita du Plessis (born 1972), Afrikaans singer, born in Windhoek, Namibia
- Koos du Plessis (1945–1984), South African songwriter
- Phil du Plessis (1944–2011), Afrikaans poet, musician, and medical doctor
- Zack du Plessis (1950–2011), South African actor

=== Other ===
- Barend du Plessis (born 1940), South African politician
- David du Plessis (1905–1987), South African Pentecostal minister
- Erik du Plessis, Chairman of Millward Brown South Africa and author
- Eric Hollingsworth du Plessis (born 1950), American author and University professor
- Jan du Plessis (born 1954), British-South African businessman
- Johannes du Plessis (1868–1935), South African DRC missionary
- Susanna du Plessis (1739–1795), Dutch plantation owner in Dutch Surinam

== Other people ==
- Homer Plessy, American litigant, plaintiff in the landmark Plessy v. Ferguson Supreme Court decision
- John de Plessis, 7th Earl of Warwick
- Joseph-Octave Plessis (1763–1825), Canadian bishop

== See also ==
- Le Plessis (disambiguation), the name of 23 communes in France
- Collège du Plessis
- Jaco du Plessis
- Plessis Bouchard
- Plessey, a historic British corporation
- Plessis 1817 ellipsoid
- Plessis, New York
- Piet Plessis
