= Choiseul family =

French noble family

Coat of arms of Choiseul-Praslin family

The House of Choiseul is a French noble family of chivalric extraction, first mentioned in 1060. Originally from Champagne, its cradle is the village of Choiseul (in the modern day Haute-Marne department). An illustrious house, its members held prominent political, ecclesiastical and military positions within the Kingdom of France. The Choiseul family is one of the oldest French families still in existence, having been identified among the families surviving into the 21st century who have been able to prove their filiation in the male line, both natural and legitimate, without interruption back to a first ancestor attested by a deed dating from before 1250.

== History ==
The Choiseul-Praslin Family were descendants of the counts of Langres. Renaud III de Choiseul, comte de Langres and Lord de Choiseul, was the family's head. Renaud married Alix de Dreux, daughter of Louis VI of France, in 1182. The family formed into the Langres, Clémont, Aigremont, Beaugré, Allecourt, Frontières, Praslin, Plessis branches. It also took the name Choiseul-Gouffier from the 18th century onwards.

It has produced several marshals:

- Jean de Baudricourt (?–1499), seigneur of Baudricourt and of Choiseul
- Charles de Choiseul, comte of the Plessis-Praslin (1563–1626), who served under Henri IV and Louis XIII
- César de Choiseul du Plessis-Praslin, duc de Choiseul (1598–1675), who defied Turenne at Rethel (1650), when he commanded the Spanish army
- César, duc de Choiseul (1602–1675), French marshal and diplomat, generally known for the best part of his life as marshal du Plessis-Praslin
- Claude de Choiseul, comte de Choiseul-Francières (1632–1711), who distinguished himself in the battle of Seneffe against the Dutch Republic and made a marshal in 1693

Two bishops and an archbishop:

- Gilbert de Choiseul du Plessis Praslin (1613–31 December 1689 at Tournai), Bishop of Comminges from 1644 to 1670; brother of marshal César de Choiseul du Plessis-Praslin
- Gabriel-Florent de Choiseul-Beaupré (1718–1723), bishop of Saint-Papoul, bishop of Mende
- Antoine-Clériade de Choiseul-Beaupré (1754–1774), Archbishop of Besançon

Also a famous minister, a diplomat, etc. :

- Étienne François, duc de Choiseul (1719–1785), ambassador then Secretary of State to Louis XV
- César Gabriel de Choiseul, duc de Praslin (1712–1785), cousin of the former, ambassador then secretary of state to Louis XV
- Marie-Gabriel-Florent-Auguste de Choiseul-Gouffier (1752–1817), French writer
- Claude Antoine Gabriel, duc de Choiseul-Stainville (1760–1838), French writer and peer
- Charles de Choiseul-Praslin (1805–1847), 5th Duke of Praslin, French député and peer
- Gaston Louis Philippe de Choiseul-Praslin (1834–1906), 6th Duke of Praslin, married to Mary Elizabeth Forbes, sister of H. De Courcy Forbes
- Horace de Choiseul-Praslin (23 February 1837 – 26 December 1915)
- Comte Eugène Antonio (Antoine) Horace de Choiseul-Praslin, a French politician.

== Lineage ==
- Renier Ier de Choiseul
  - Roger de Choiseul
  - Adeline de Choiseul
    - Foulques Ier de Choiseul
      - Renard Ier de Choiseul
        - Foulques II de Choiseul
          - Renard II of Choiseul (c. 1175–1239)
            - Jean Ier de Choiseul
              - Jean II de Choiseul
                - Gautier de Choiseul
                  - Jean III de Choiseul
                  - Henri de Choiseul
                  - Gui Ier de Choiseul
                    - Aymé de Choiseul
                      - Jeanne de Choiseul
              - Renier I de Choiseul
                - Renier II de Choiseul
                  - Renier III de Choiseul
                    - Pierre Gaillehaud I de Choiseul
                      - Pierre Gaillehaud II de Choiseul
                        - Pierre Gallehaud III de Choiseul
                          - Nicolas de Choiseul (died 1537)
                            - Ferry I de Choiseul (died 1569)
                              - Charles de Choiseul-Praslin (1563-1626)
                              - Ferry II de Choiseul
                                - César de Choiseul, 1st Duke of Choiseul (1602–1675)
                                  - Alexandre de Choiseul du Plessis-Praslin (1634–1672)
                                    - César II Auguste de Choiseul (1664–1684)
                                  - César Auguste de Choiseul de Plessis-Praslin (1637–1705)
                                    - Augustine Françoise de Choiseul (1697–1728)
                                - Gilbert de Choiseul du Plessis-Praslin (1613–1689)
                          - Jean de Choiseul
                            - Marceau de Choiseul (died 1595)
                              - François I de Choiseul
                                - Jacques de Choiseul
                                  - François II de Choiseul (died 1709)
                                    - Hubert de Choiseul (died 1727)
                                      - César Gabriel de Choiseul, 1st Duke of Praslin (1712–1785)
                                        - Renaud César de Choiseul-Praslin (1735–1791)
                                          - Antoine-César de Choiseul-Praslin (1756–1808)
                                            - Charles-Félix de Choiseul-Praslin (1778–1841)
                                              - Charles de Choiseul, 5th Duke of Praslin (1805–1847)
                                                - Gaston de Choiseul, 6th Duke of Praslin (1834–1906)
                                                  - Gabriel de Choiseul (1879–1966)
                                                    - Charles-Marie de Choiseul-Praslin (1920–1945)
                                                      - Charles-Henri de Choiseul Praslin (1944–2019)
                                                - Horace de Choiseul-Praslin (1837–1915)
                        - Jean de Choiseul
                          - Pierre III de Choiseul
                            - René II de Choiseul
                              - Chrétien de Choiseul (died 1593)
                                - Louis-François de Choiseul (died 1666)
                                  - Louis de Choiseul (died 1690)
                                    - François-Joseph, comte de Choiseul-Beaupré (died 1711)
                                      - François Joseph de Choiseul, Marquis of Stainville (1696–1769)
                                        - Étienne François de Choiseul, Duke of Choiseul (1719–1785)
                                        - Léopold-Charles de Choiseul-Stainville (1724–1774)
                                        - Jacques Philippe de Choiseul, Duke of Stainville (1727–1789)
                                          - Marie Thérèse de Choiseul (1766–1794)
                                        - Béatrix de Choiseul (1729–1794)
                                - Antoine de Choiseul (died 1648)
                                  - Jacques-François de Choiseul (1629–1686)
                                    - Antoine-Clériadus de Choiseul-Beaupré (1664–1726)
                                      - Claude-Antoine de Choiseul-Beaupré (1697–1763)
                                      - Charles Marie de Choiseul (1698–1768)
                                        - Marie Gabriel Florent Christophe de Choiseul (1728–1753)
                                          - Marie-Gabriel-Florent-Auguste de Choiseul-Gouffier (1752–1817)
                                            - Antoine-Louis-Octave de Choiseul-Gouffier (1773–1840)
                                              - Artur Octavien François de Choiseul-Gouffier
                                                - Alix de Choiseul Gouffier (1832–1915)
                                          - Michel-Félix-Victor de Choiseul d'Aillecourt (1754–1796)
                                            - Maxime de Choiseul d'Aillecourt (1782–1854)
                                            - Gaspard-Marie-Victor de Choiseul d'Aillecourt (1779–1835)
                                        - Claude Antoine Clériadus de Choiseul La Baume (1733–1794)
                                          - Claude Antoine Gabriel de Choiseul, Duke of Choiseul (1760–1838)
                                      - Antoine Clériadus de Choiseul-Beaupré (1707–1774)
                                    - Gabriel-Florent de Choiseul-Beaupré (1685–1767)
                              - Maximilien de Choiseul
                                - François de Choiseul
                                  - Maximilien de Choiseul
                                    - Henri Louis de Choiseul
                                      - Maximilien Jean de Choiseul-Meuse
                                        - François Joseph de Choiseul
                                          - Félicité de Choiseul-Meuse (1767–1838)
                              - Jean de Choiseul
                                - Louis de Choiseul
                                  - Claude de Choiseul, Marquis of Francières (1632–1711)
            - Robert de Choiseul
          - Barthélemy de Choiseul
