= County of Bassigny =

Former feudal territory in France

Bassigny County
- Status: Movable fief of the county of Champagne in the kingdom of France.
- Capital: Bassoncourt
- Other languages: Old French; Champenois (de facto); Medieval Latin (de jure)
- Religion: Catholicism

Establishment
  - Creation of the county: 9th century
  - Division into several seigneuries: 11th century
- 1. Previous entities: Pagus Bassiniacensis; 2. Following entities: Seigneury of Clefmont; Seigneury of Choiseul; Seigneury of Nogent

The County of Bassigny (Latin: Comitatus Bassiniacensis) is a former feudal territory of the County of Champagne in the Kingdom of France, probably centered around the town of Bassoncourt. Located north of Langres, it was successively a pagus, then a Carolingian county, a bailiwick, and finally the region known as Bassigny.

The demonym of Bassigny is Bassignot.

== Geopolitics of the county in the Middle Ages ==
=== Introduction ===
The “Pagus Bassiniacensis,” part of the Civitas Lingonum, was already known in the time of Julius Caesar as a natural passage toward Germania and as a fertile area suitable for a military post. The Roman roads Lyon–Trier and Langres–Naix crossed through the region. Its history is closely linked to the ancient city of Langres.

=== Administrative center ===
In Histoire des Choiseul (1996), Gilles Poissonnier suggests that the domain of Basin (Latin Basinus curtis), from which Bassigny may have taken its name, could have had the village of Bassoncourt as its administrative center, based on the etymological similarity between the village and the pagus. Poissonnier also notes that the village is very old and lies between Clefmont and Choiseul, two lordship seats resulting from the fragmentation of the County of Bassigny, analogous to the relationship between Bologne and Sexfontaines and Vignory during the fragmentation of the County of Bolenois.

From an ecclesiastical perspective, Is-en-Bassigny, located about ten kilometers from Bassoncourt, became the seat of a deanery and of an archdeaconry that also included the deanery of Pierrefaites.

=== Under the Merovingians ===
The Burgundian pagi in the 9th century

After the fall of the Roman Empire and the invasions of the 5th century, the territory was occupied by the Alamanni and later incorporated into the Kingdom of the Burgundians, which captured Langres around 460. The region was annexed by the Merovingian Kingdom of the Franks in 534. During this period, the Ripuarian Franks also advanced to the vicinity of Langres around 485–486.

This pagus was situated on the border between the dioceses of Langres and Toul, and therefore between the provinces of Lyon and Trier, giving the territory a frontier status reflected in the Treaty of Andelot.

In the 7th century, Bassigny belonged to Gondoin (also spelled Gondouin, † around 656), lord of Ornois, Bolenois, and Bassigny, and father of Saint Salaberge and Bodon Leudin, bishop of Toul. The Wulfoald/Gundouinides clan was among the main opponents of the Pippinids.

=== Under the Carolingians ===
In the 8th century, the territory was associated with Saint Gengoul (702–760), a prominent Burgundian baron, and some historians suggest a genealogical connection between him and Gondoin.

The County of Bassigny is first mentioned in the context of the Treaty of Verdun in 843, when Lothair I received the Bolenois, Bassigny, and the Barrois of the Aube, which are considered to have formed a single county. According to historian Maurice Chaume, Bassigny later passed to a lineage linked to Donat I of Melun (c. 790 – after 858/before 871), count and missus dominicus in the province of Sens, and his wife Landrade, daughter of Count Bego of Paris. Subsequent territorial divisions remain unclear, but the boundaries become more defined with the rise of the Ottonians in Lotharingia.

Following the creation of the Duchy of Burgundy after 880, the county was annexed to it. During this period, the region was affected by Viking raids, which continued until 925. Subsequently, the conflict between Hugh the Great and Hugh the Black led to a siege of Langres by Hugh the Great in 936.

In 941, Roger II of Laon obtained Bassigny as a benefice, although the exact nature of the alliance that facilitated this acquisition remains uncertain. In 961, his son Hugh donated the curtis of Condes to Saint Remi of Reims and gave the Val-de-Rognon to the canons, in the presence of King Lothair and at the request of Queen Gerberge and Count Renaud of Roucy. Hugh died later that same year.

=== Under the Capetians ===
Lambert of Bassigny (d. 1031), the last male descendant of his line and bishop of Langres, is reported to have divided his fiefs of Clefmont, Sexfontaines, and Vignory among his relatives. Some sources also suggest a common origin between the lineage of the counts and the feudal families of Choiseul and Nogent, who subsequently divided Bassigny among themselves.

== Counts of Bassigny ==
=== First branch ===
- Gosselin I of Bassigny or Gozlin († 861), said to be the son of Donat I, Count of Melun, linked to the Rorgonid clan, and of Landrée (or Landrade), possibly daughter of Bego, Count of Paris. Of Carolingian lineage, he is a descendant of Charlemagne.
- Hugh I of Bassigny (?-?), brother of the previous.
- Hugh II of Bassigny (c. 852 – 914).
- Gosselin II of Bassigny († around 931) or Goscelmus (in Latin), Josselin, lord with possessions in Bassigny, attended the synod held in the Cathedral of Langres in April 906. Having become Bishop of Langres in 922, he was among those who, with the counts Garnier of Sens, Manassès of Dijon, and Bishop Ansegise of Troyes, inflicted a severe defeat on the Viking Ragenold of Nantes on December 6, 924, at Calaus Mons, which may be Chalmont (between Milly-la-Forêt and Barbizon) or rather Chalaux on the river of the same name in Nièvre. (Note: While Roegnvald entered Burgundy, pillaging everything in his path, Counts Garnier of Sens and Manasses of Dijon, along with Bishops Josselin of Langres and Anseis of Troyes, perhaps secretly warned by Marquis Hugues, gathered their vassals. These lords went out to meet the Normans, who were retreating towards northern France, laden with booty. The clash took place on the borders of Gâtinais, at Chalmont, on December 6. The fighting was fierce. The Normans were determined to secure their retreat, and the Burgundians were determined to make them pay for the devastation they had wrought in their lands. Eight hundred Normans are said to have been killed. On the Burgundian side, Count Garnier had his horse killed under him and was captured and put to death.)
- Hugh III of Bassigny († after 939), Count of Bassigny around 906, and of Bolenois by marriage, son of Hugh II and brother of the previous.
- Gosselin III († after 940), son of the previous, was Count of Bassigny-Bolenois and later Abbot of Saints-Geosmes.

=== Second branch ===
- Hugh IV of Bassigny († 25/08/961), “Consanguineus” (cousin) of King Lothair, was Count of Bassigny-Bolenois, son of the previous, and was buried at Saint-Remi of Reims.
- Richard (?-?), Count of Bassigny, was very likely the brother of Lambert of Bassigny or of Clefmont († 1031), Bishop of Langres from 1016 until his death.
- Roger (?-† 1005), Count or Viscount of Bassigny.

== French, Lorraine, and “mouvant” Bassigny ==
The French portion of Bassigny belonged to the Province of Champagne, while the remainder was part of Lorraine. The area of Domrémy where Joan of Arc was born was located within the French Bassigny, whereas another part of Domrémy was in the Barrois, corresponding to Lorraine in the modern sense.

=== The bailiwick of Bassigny ===
The Bailiwick of Bassigny encompassed the Lorraine Bassigny and the “mouvant” Bassigny, which were distinct from the French Bassigny. The Lorraine Bassigny comprised the provostships of La Mothe and Bourmont. The “mouvant” Bassigny, named to differentiate it from the French Bassigny, had its seat of justice in Chaumont and included the provostships of Conflans, Châtillon, La Marche, Gondrecourt (which included Domrémy), and Saint-Thiébaut. The “mouvant” Bassigny was a feudal fief subject to the Crown of France and under the jurisdiction of the Parliament of Paris, and it was held successively by the Duke of Bar and the Duke of Lorraine.

=== Customary law of Bassigny ===
Bassigny was part of Champagne and was a Pays d’État, a province with its own estates.

The Bailiwick of Chaumont had customs that were written and published on 19 October 1509.

The Custom of Bassigny partly governed the Bailiwick of Bourmont. This custom was reformed by the Estates of Bassigny, who met in 1580 at the castle of La Mothe-en-Bassigny by order of Duke Charles III of Lorraine, and it was confirmed in 1585 by the Parliament of Paris.

- Article 1. – The old custom of Bassigny distinguished noble persons from non-nobles, and among the latter, free persons from those of servile condition. As serfdom no longer exists in France, any agreement by which a person would enter into the service of another is declared null.
- Article 2. – Legitimate children of a noble father or mother are considered noble. This custom is also found in Troyes and Meaux. Champagne lost much of its nobility during the wars between Lothair, son of Louis the Pious, and Charles the Bald, and noblewomen had the privilege of ennobling their commoner husbands and their children.

== See also ==
- Choiseul family
