= Antoine Clériadus de Choiseul-Beaupré =

His Eminence Antoine Clériadus de Choiseul-Beaupré
- Cardinal, Archbishop of Besançon
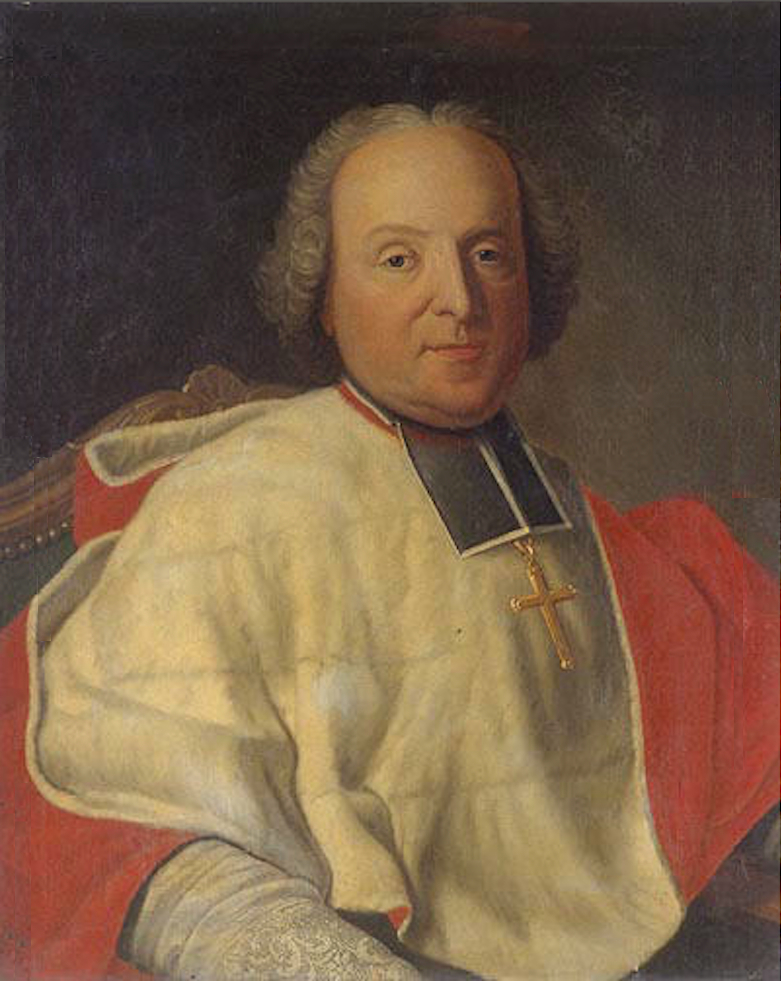
- The Cardinal de Choiseul in a provincial copy of his official portrait (Musée des beaux-arts, Dole)
- Church: Roman Catholic
- Other post: Abbot commendatario of Saint Bertin

Orders
- Consecration: 25 May 1755 by Gabriel-Florent de Choiseul-Beaupré
- Created cardinal: 23 November 1761 by Pope Clement XIII
- Rank: Cardinal-Priest

Personal details
- Born: 28 September 1707 Daillecourt, France
- Died: 7 January 1774 (aged 66) Besançon, France
- Buried: Besançon Cathedral

Claude Antoine Clériadus de Choiseul, Cardinal de Choiseul (29 September 1707 – 7 January 1774) was a cardinal of the Roman Catholic Church.

He was made vicar-general of Mende in 1733. As a member of the important family of Choiseul, he was Grand Aumônier to Stanisław Leszczyński, titular king of Poland, at his court at Nancy, Lorraine, from 1742, in which year he was promoted to Primate of the church of Lorraine. He was elected archbishop of Besançon, 17 March 1755, and raised to the cardinalate by Pope Clement XIII in the consistory of 23 November 1761. Choiseul de Beaupré, usually styled the Cardinal de Choiseul, participated in the conclave of 1769 that elected Pope Clement XIV.

The younger son of Antoine-Clériadus, Count of Choiseul, Marquis of Beaupré, seigneur of Daillecourt (1664—1726) he was born at the family château of Daillecourt (Haute-Marne ), in the diocese of Langres, France. He studied theology at the University of Paris. He carried the French court sinecure of Aumônier du Roi from 1736. He died in Paris and is buried in his cathedral of Besançon.

The name was also carried by his namesake, Claude Antoine Clériadus de Choiseul (1733 — 1794), created Prince of -Beaupré.
