= Prince Joseph of Monaco =

Prince of Monaco (1763–1816)

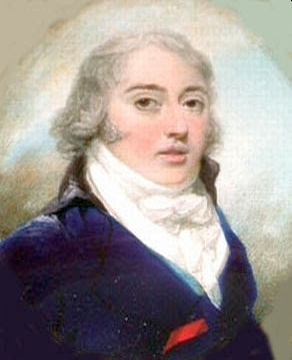
- Portrait by unknown, turn of the 18/19th century
- Born: 10 September 1763; Hôtel Matignon, Paris, France
- Died: 28 June 1816 (aged 52); Paris, France
- Spouse: Françoise de Choiseul (m. 1782; died 1794): Frances Rainford
- Issue: Marie Camille, Marquise de La Tour-du-Pin; Athénais, Marquise de Louvois; Princess Delphine
Names
- Joseph Marie Jerôme Honoré Grimaldi
- House: Grimaldi
- Father: Honoré III, Prince of Monaco
- Mother: Maria Caterina Brignole-Sale
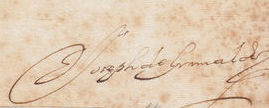
- Signature

Prince Joseph Marie Jerôme Honoré of Monaco (10 September 1763 – 28 June 1816) was the second son of Honoré III, Prince of Monaco, and Maria Caterina Brignole and the younger brother of Prince Honoré IV. Joseph served as regent of Monaco on behalf of his brother in 1814–1815.

== Biography ==
Prince Joseph was the second son of Honoré III, Prince of Monaco, and his Genovese wife Maria Caterina Brignole-Sale. He married Françoise de Choiseul, a niece of Étienne François, duc de Choiseul, on 6 April 1782. The marriage produced three children, only one of whom left descendants. Prince Joseph's first wife was executed in July 1794.

During the French Revolution, Joseph was often absent on foreign travels in order to secure loans for his father. During the Terror of Robespierre, these foreign trips placed him under suspicion for counterrevolutionary activity. He did in fact support the royalist uprising in Vendée. This caused him to be declared a traitor in his absence, and resulted in the arrest of his wife, father, brother and sister-in-law in Paris. He lived in exile in Great Britain, and returned to France in 1795. When his brother became Prince of Monaco in 1814, but was unable to manage the affairs of state because of poor health, Joseph was appointed regent. He was replaced as regent of Monaco in 1815, as Honoré V, the son of Honoré IV, successfully claimed the right to the throne as its rightful successor.

== Marriages and Issue ==
Prince Joseph was married firstly to Marie Thérèse de Choiseul, daughter of Jacques Philippe de Choiseul, Duke of Stainville and Thérèse de Clermont d'Amboise. They had issue:

- Princess Marie Camille of Monaco (22 Apr 1784 – 8 May 1879); married René, Marquis de La Tour-du-Pin, and had issue.
- Princess Athénais of Monaco (2 June 1786 – 11 September 1860); married Auguste Le Tellier de Souvré, Marquis de Louvois, and had no issue.
- Princess Delphine of Monaco (born 22 July 1788); died at birth.

Prince Joseph remarried to Frances Doyle, widow of Major-General Wellbore Ellis Doyle (d.1798) and daughter of Edward Rainsford of Richmond, Co. Dublin. They had no children.

== Ancestry ==
Ancestors of Prince Joseph of Monaco

8. Jacques III Goyon de Matignon
4. Jacques I, Prince of Monaco
9. Charlotte Goyon de Matignon, Countess de Thorigny
2. Honoré III Grimaldi, Prince of Monaco
10. Antonio I, Prince of Monaco
5. Louise Hippolyte Grimaldi, Princess of Monaco
11. Marie de Lorraine-Armagnac
1. Prince Joseph of Monaco
12. Anton Giulio Brignole Sale, 5th Marchese di Groppoli
6. Giuseppe Maria Brignole Sale, 7th Marchese di Groppoli
13. Isabella Brignole Sale
3. Maria Caterina Brignole Sale
14. Francesco Balbi, Doge of Genoa
7. Maria Anna Balbi
15. Maria Clarice Durazzo
