= Gilbert de Choiseul du Plessis-Praslin =

French bishop

- Bishop of Tournai
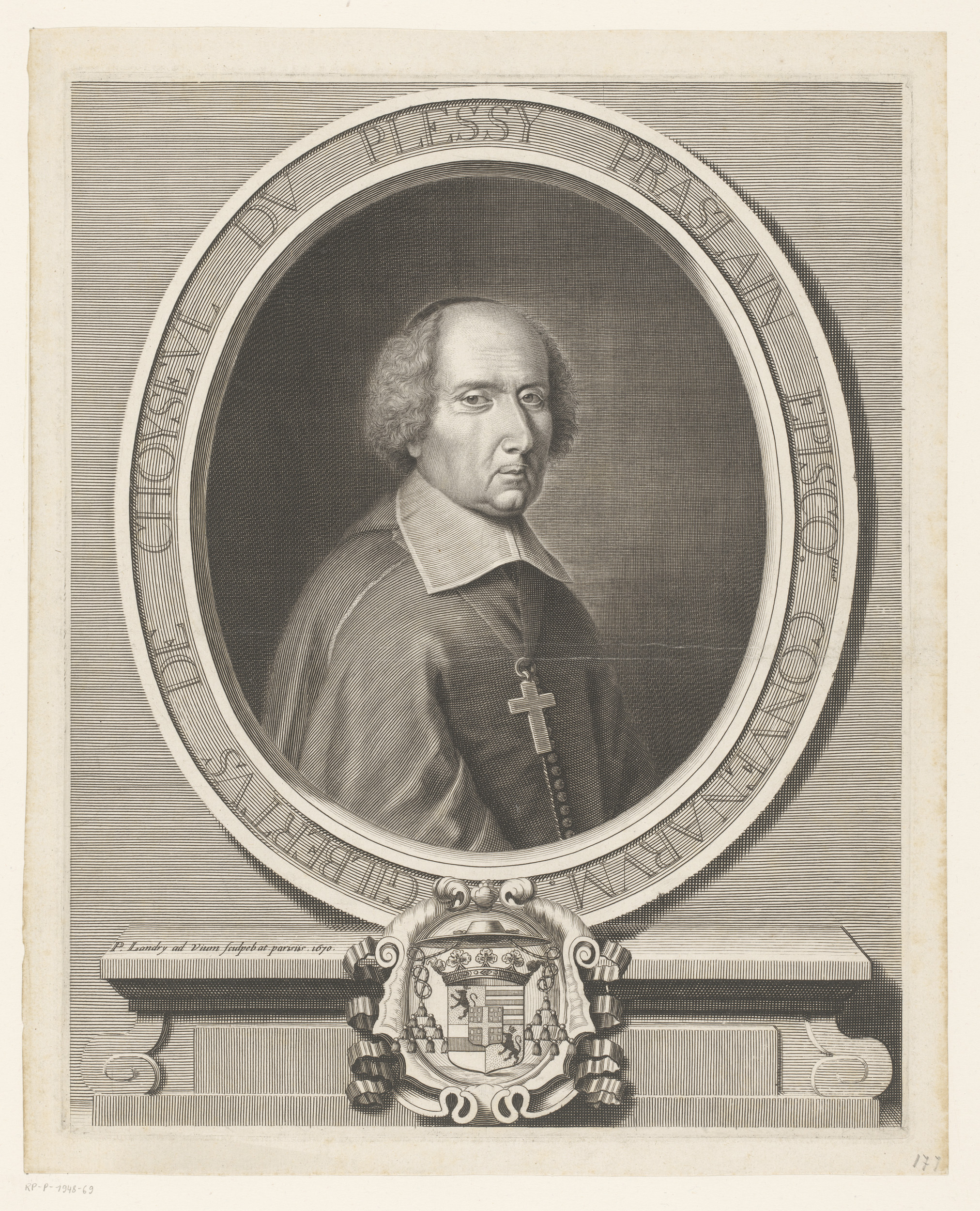
- Engraved portrait of Gilbert Choiseul du Plessis-Praslin by Pierre Landry, 1670
- Church: Catholic Church
- Diocese: Diocese of Tournai
- In office: 22 December 1670 – 31 December 1689
- Predecessor: François Villain
- Successor: François de Caillebot de La Salle
- Previous post: Bishop of Comminges (1646-1670)

Orders
- Consecration: 8 April 1646 by Dominique de Vic

Personal details
- Born: 1613
- Died: 31 December 1689 (aged 76)

Gilbert Choiseul du Plessis-Praslin (born 1613; died at Paris, 31 December 1689) was a French bishop.

== Early life ==
Choiseul was a descendant of the noble family of du Plessis. He devoted himself from his earliest youth to the ecclesiastical state, while his brother Cæsar Choiseul du Plessis-Praslin entered a military career. Gilbert received the title of Doctor at the Sorbonne in 1640. He was consecrated bishop of Comminges in 1644, and at once set about visiting his diocese, restoring discipline among the clergy, and establishing schools and colleges. In time of famine he pawned his own property to assist the poor; and during the plague until stricken by the disease he ministered in person to the sick. In 1671 he was transferred to the Diocese of Tournai, where he displayed the same pastoral zeal.

== In controversy ==
His influence on the ecclesiastical affairs of France at large was less successful. When, in 1651, the majority of the French bishops petitioned Pope Innocent X to decide upon the ten propositions of Jansenius, Choiseul was among the eleven who requested no decision in the case. Unable to prevent a formal condemnation of the Jansenists, he exerted himself to bring about an agreement between the contending parties.

His posture on Gallicanism was clearer. For his advocacy of the "Gallican Liberties" he was chosen, in the Assembly of the Clergy of 1682, member of the committee on resolutions, and was personally entrusted with the duty of formulating in Latin the propositions on which the Assembly was to vote. Louis XIV had in 1673 extended to his entire kingdom the royal right of régale. Two bishops only protested against the usurpation and appealed to Rome. This was the beginning of a stubborn struggle between Innocent XI and Louis XIV. To obtain public approval and support from his clergy, and to have limits set to the pontifical power, the king, at the instance principally of his minister, Jean-Baptiste Colbert, convoked the French clergy in a general assembly. Choiseul had no sooner presented his draft than Bossuet rose against it. An animated discussion, related in full by Fénelon in his "De Summi Pontificis Auctoritate", ensued. When Choiseul saw that Jacques-Bénigne Bossuet's conciliatory distinction between the Holy See's infallibility in teaching the Catholic faith and its indefectibility in holding it found favour with both clergy and Court, he resigned his special commission. Bossuet took his place and drew up the four articles as they passed into history.

Choiseul approved the French translation of a little book published in Cologne under the title "Monita salutaria Beatæ Mariæ Virginis ad cultores suos discretos". This book was so criticized for Jansenist leanings that Choiseul published, in a pastoral letter on the Blessed Virgin, a justification of himself.

== Works ==
He published (Paris, 1681–85) his "Mémoires touchant la Religion", against atheists, libertines, and Protestants. His "Psalms and Hymns of the Church", done into French, ran through several editions. He also arranged and gave the literary finish to the memoirs of his brother, Ambrose Maréchal Choiseul du Plessis.
