= Claude de Choiseul, Marquis of Francières =

Claude de Choiseul
- Marquis of Francières; Count of Choiseul
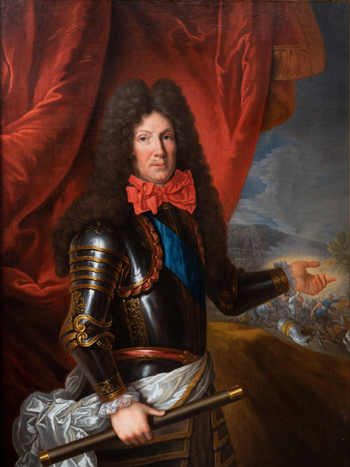
- Portrait by Pierre Mignard, 17th century
- Born: 1 January 1632; Langres, France
- Died: 15 March 1711 (aged 79); Paris, France
- Buried: Père Lachaise Cemetery
- Noble family: Choiseul
- Spouse: Catherine de Renty (m. 1658)
- Father: Louis de Choiseul, Marquis of Francières
- Mother: Catherine de Nicey
- Military career
- Allegiance: Kingdom of France
- Rank: Marshal of France
- Wars: Franco-Dutch War; Battle of Seneffe; Battle of Ortenbach
- Awards: Order of the Holy Spirit; Order of Saint Michael

Claude de Choiseul, Marquis of Francières (1 January 1632 – 15 March 1711) was count of Choiseul, marquis of Francières, seigneur d'Yroüerre, and a Marshal of France beginning in 1693.

== Biography ==
Claude de Choiseul-Francières was the son of Louis de Francières, baron and later Marquis of Francières, seigneur d'Yroüerre and of Catherine de Nicey..

As a young man, he fought against the Spanish in the Battles of Vitry-sur-Seine (1653), Mouzon, Sainte-Menehould and Arras (1654). He followed the King to besiege Marsal in 1663, commanded a regiment in the Hungarian expedition where distinguished himself at the siege of Raab and was sent to Crete to aid the Venetians during the Siege of Candia.

He distinguished himself in the Battle of Seneffe (1674) against the Dutch Republic and later fought at the Battle of Ortenbach (1678). In 1684, he captured the city of Liège on behalf of the Elector of Cologne. He then went to serve in Germany with Marshal de Lorge until the peace in 1696.

He was brigadier in 1667, Maréchal de camp in 1669, Lieutenant-general in 1676 and finally Marshal of France in 1693.

On 5 May 1658 he married Catherine (died 17 October 1710), daughter of Gaston de Renty, baron of Landelles. He was buried in the church of the Order of Picpus (57, rue de Picpus). His remains were rediscovered in 1860 and reburied in the Père Lachaise Cemetery.
