= Marie Thérèse de Choiseul =

Marie Thérèse Françoise de Choiseul
- Princess Joseph of Monaco
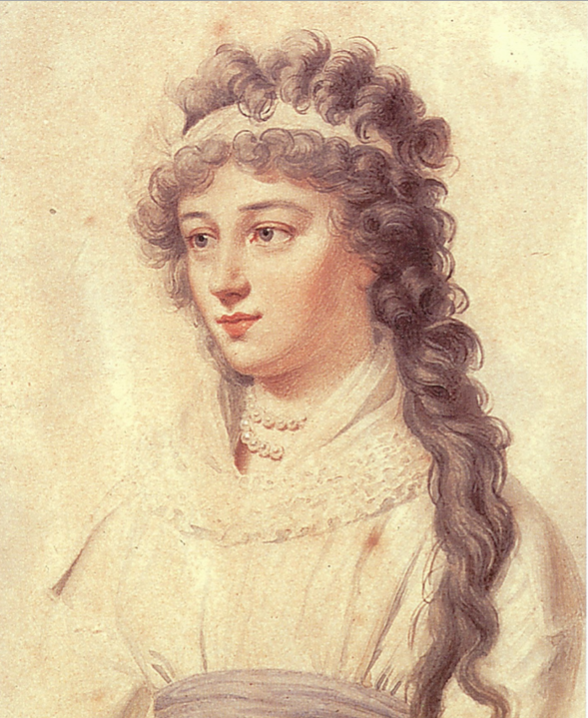
- Born: 8 December 1766; Paris, France
- Died: 27 July 1794 (aged 27); Paris, France
- Spouse: Prince Joseph of Monaco (m. 1782)
- Issue: Marie Camille, Marquise de La Tour-du-Pin; Athénais, Marquise de Louvois; Princess Delphine
- House: Choiseul
- Father: Jacques Philippe de Choiseul, Duke of Stainville
- Mother: Thérèse de Clermont

Arms of Princess Marie Thérèse of Monaco.

Marie Thérèse Françoise de Choiseul (8 December 1766 – 27 July 1794) was a French noblewoman and a Monegasque princess, married to Prince Joseph of Monaco in 1782.

== Life ==
She was the daughter of Jacques Philippe de Choiseul, Duke of Stainville, and Thérèse de Clermont, and the niece of Étienne François, duc de Choiseul, the chief minister of King Louis XV. On 6 April 1782, she married Prince Joseph of Monaco. The marriage was described as a happy one.

In March 1793, Monaco was annexed to Revolutionary France, and the members of the former ruling dynasty became French citizens. In parallel, her spouse spent most of his time abroad to negotiate foreign loans, which made him a suspect of counter-revolutionary activities and thus made whole family suspected of being traitors. He became, in fact, involved in the royalist uprising in Vendée. Marie Thérèse de Choiseul was arrested in the absence of her spouse, as was his father, his brother and his sister-in-law. Arrested in Paris on charges of conspiracy, Marie Thérèse was imprisoned with her family in the Sainte-Pélagie Prison. Her small daughters were left in the care of their governess.

She was condemned to death. To delay the execution, she pretended to be pregnant, but was discovered not to be with child. She admitted having lied about her pregnancy, but explained that she had done so to delay the execution only for a day, so that she may have time to cut off her own hair and give it to her daughters as a memory, rather than have it cut by the executioner. She applied for a meeting with Antoine Quentin Fouquier-Tinville, and spent her last day in his waiting room, but was forced to leave without having had time to meet him.

Her execution on 27 July would be one of the last during the Reign of Terror; on the same day, the Thermidorian Reaction saw the violent fall of the Jacobin government, which saw the executions of Maximilien Robespierre as well as René-François Dumas, the prosecutor in the princess' trial.

== Issue ==
- Princess Marie Camille Grimaldi of Monaco (22 Apr 1784 – 8 May 1879); married René, Marquis of La Tour-du-Pin, and had issue.
- Princess Athénais Grimaldi of Monaco (2 June 1786 – 11 September 1860); married Auguste Le Tellier, Marquis of Louvois, and had no issue.
- Princess Delphine Grimaldi of Monaco (born 22 July 1788); died young.
