= Wade du Plessis =

South African soccer player

Personal information
- Date of birth: 12 May 1967 (age 59)
- Place of birth: South Africa
- Position: Goalkeeper

Senior career*
Years	Team	Apps	(Gls)
1987–1988	Durban City	72	(0)
1989–1993	Kaizer Chiefs	204	(1)
1994–1995	D'Alberton Callies	65	(0)
1996	Orlando Pirates	3	(0)
1997	Michau Warriors	20	(0)
1998–1999	AmaZulu	55	(0)
Total		419	(0)

International career^{‡}
1994	South Africa	2	(0)
- * Club domestic league appearances and goals as of 30 May 2012 ‡ National team caps and goals as of 30 May 2012

Wade du Plessis (born 12 May 1967) is a South African former soccer player, who played in South Africa for Kaizer Chiefs and AmaZulu.

== International career ==
He made his international debut on 30 November 1994 in a 0–0 draw against Ivory Coast and played his second and last international in a 1–1 draw against Cameroon on 3 December 1994.
