= Traves, Haute-Saône =

Traves
- Commune
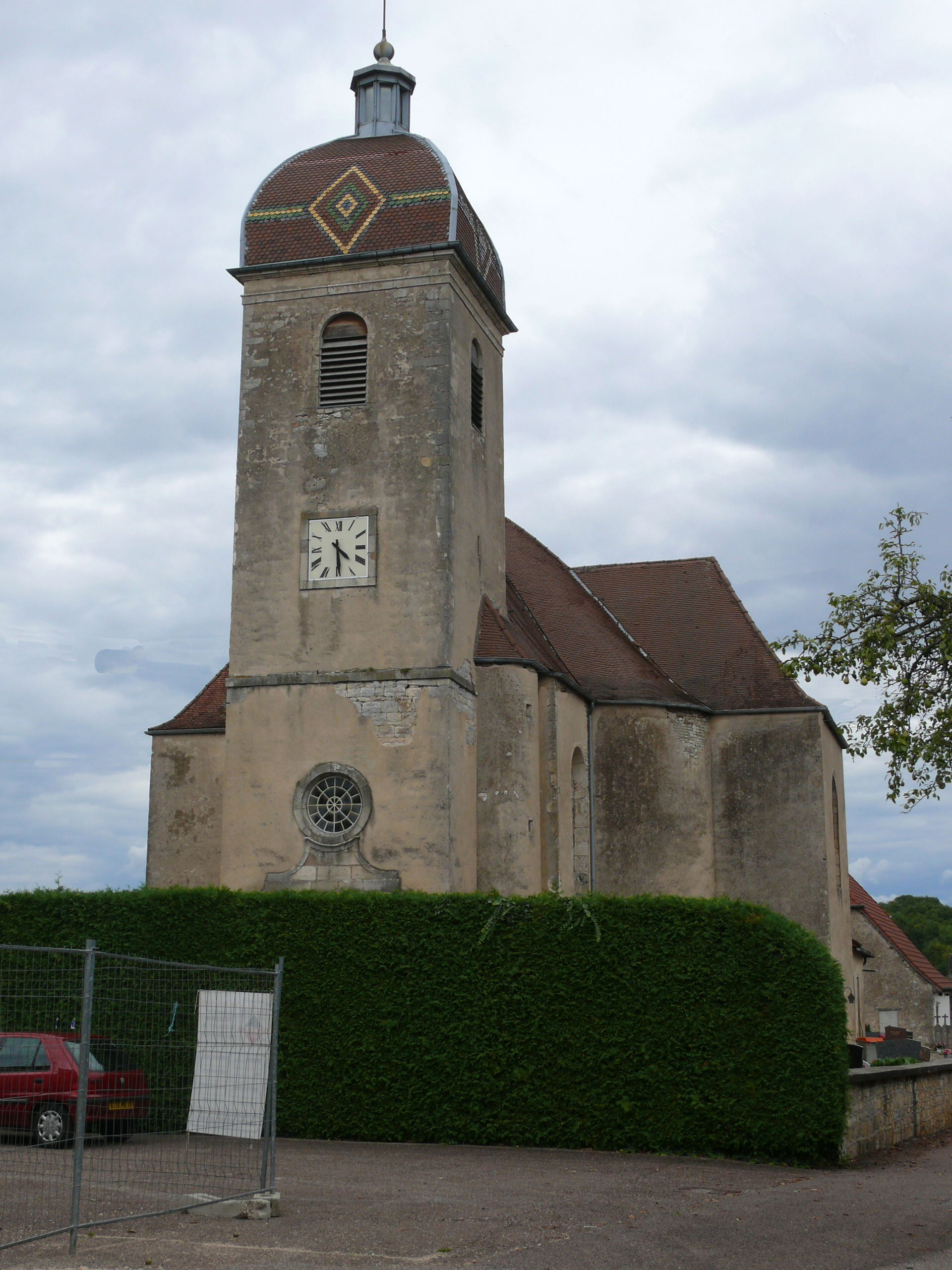
- Church of Traves
- Location of Traves
- Location within France Location within Bourgogne-Franche-Comté
- Coordinates: 47°36′47″N 5°58′18″E
- Country: France
- Region: Bourgogne-Franche-Comté
- Department: Haute-Saône
- Arrondissement: Vesoul
- Canton: Scey-sur-Saône-et-Saint-Albin

Government
  - Mayor (2020–2026): Fernand Stefani
- Area^{1}: 12.29 km^{2} (4.75 sq mi)
- Highest elevation: 262 m (860 ft)
- Lowest elevation: 201 m (659 ft)
- Population (2023): 345
  - Density: 28.1/km^{2} (72.7/sq mi)
- Time zone: UTC+01:00 (CET)
  - Summer (DST): UTC+02:00 (CEST)
- INSEE/Postal code: 70504 /70360
- ^{1} French Land Register data, which excludes lakes, ponds, glaciers > 1 km^{2} (0.386 sq mi or 247 acres) and river estuaries.

Traves (French pronunciation: [tʁav]) is a commune in the Haute-Saône department in the region of Bourgogne-Franche-Comté in eastern France.

== Notable residents ==
Former SS-Standartenführer Joachim Peiper bought property and lived near the village from 27 April 1972 until his assassination on 14 July 1976. One or more arsonists set his home afire, he was asphyxiated and his body burnt.

== See also ==
- Communes of the Haute-Saône department
