= Laferté-sur-Amance =

- Commune
- Coat of arms
- Location of Laferté-sur-Amance
- Location within France Location within Grand Est
- Coordinates: 47°50′02″N 5°41′50″E
- Country: France
- Region: Grand Est
- Department: Haute-Marne
- Arrondissement: Langres
- Canton: Chalindrey

Government
  - Mayor (2022–2026): Pascale Desandre Bresson
- Area^{1}: 7.97 km^{2} (3.08 sq mi)
- Highest elevation: 358 m (1,175 ft)
- Lowest elevation: 229 m (751 ft)
- Population (2023): 109
  - Density: 13.7/km^{2} (35.4/sq mi)
- Time zone: UTC+01:00 (CET)
  - Summer (DST): UTC+02:00 (CEST)
- INSEE/Postal code: 52257 /52500
- ^{1} French Land Register data, which excludes lakes, ponds, glaciers > 1 km^{2} (0.386 sq mi or 247 acres) and river estuaries.

Laferté-sur-Amance (French pronunciation: [lafɛʁte syʁ amɑ̃s], literally Laferté on Amance) is a commune in the Haute-Marne department in north-eastern France.

== See also ==
- Communes of the Haute-Marne department
