= Paul du Plessis =

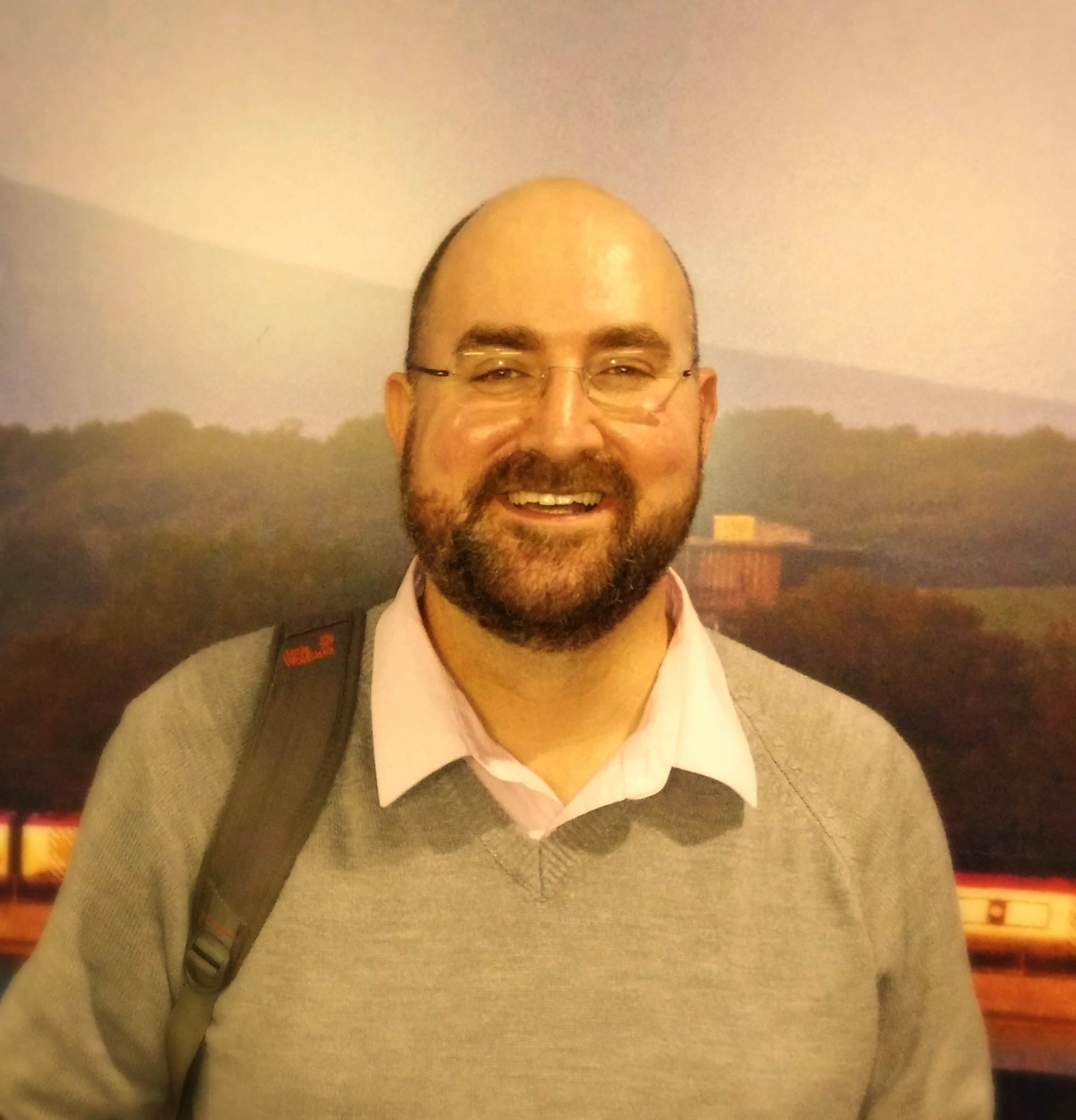
- Paul du Plessis in 2016
- Occupation: Historian
- Employer: University of Edinburgh
- Known for: History of law
- Website: http://www.law.ed.ac.uk/people/pauljduplessis

Paul du Plessis is a legal historian with a focus on law and society within the Roman Empire. He is the Professor of Roman Law at the University of Edinburgh and Director of The Centre for Legal History.

Du Plessis is a Fellow of the Royal Historical Society, co-author of The Edinburgh Legal History Blog and an editor for the monograph series Oxford Studies in Roman Society and Law.

== Selected publications ==
- Du Plessis, Paul; Cairns, John W. (2015). Reassessing legal humanism and its claims: petere fontes?. Edinburgh University Press. ISBN 9781474408851.
- Du Plessis, Paul J., ed. (2013). New frontiers law and society in the Roman world. Edinburgh: Edinburgh University Press. ISBN 0748668187.
- Du Plessis, Paul J. (2012). Studying Roman law. London: Bristol Classical Press. ISBN 1780930267.
- Du Plessis, Paul J. (2012). Letting and hiring in Roman legal thought, 27 BCE - 284 CE. Leiden: Brill. ISBN 9789004219595.
- Du Plessis, Paul (2010). Borkowski's textbook on Roman law (4th ed.). Oxford: Oxford University Press. ISBN 9780199574889.
- Du Plessis, Paul J (2016). Cicero's law: rethinking Roman law of the late Republic. Edinburgh University Press. ISBN 1474408826.
- John W. Cairns; Paul J. Du Plessis, eds. (2010). The creation of the ius commune : from Casus to Regula. Edinburgh: Edinburgh University Press. ISBN 9780748638970.
- Cairns, J.W.; Du Plessis, P.J. (2007). Beyond dogmatics law and society in the Roman world. Edinburgh: Edinburgh University Press. ISBN 9780748631773.
- Borkowski, J A; Plessis, Paul J du (2005). Textbook on Roman law. Oxford University Press. ISBN 9780199276073.
- Plessis, Paul J du (2003). A history of 'remissio mercedis' and related legal institutions [Een geschiedenis van remissio mercedis en aanverwante rechtsfiguren]. SI-EUR (Series). Sanders Instituut. ISBN 9789013007565.
