= Siege of Mouzon =

- Part of the Franco-Spanish War
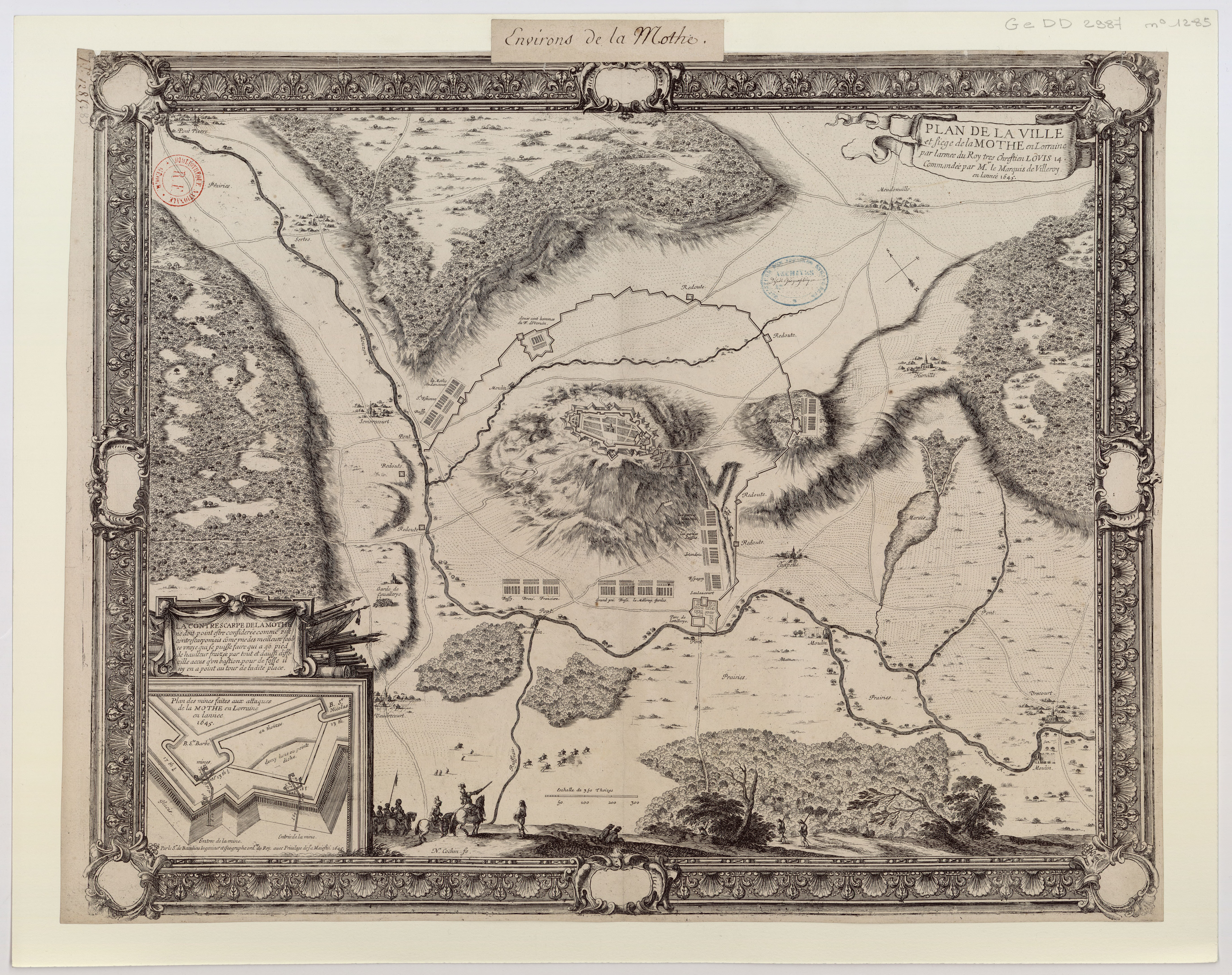
Date	12 – 28 September 1653
Location	Mouzon
Result	French victory

Belligerents
France	Spain

Commanders and leaders
(Kingdom of France) Turenne	(Spain) Archduke Leopold Wilhelm

Strength
8,000	1,500

Casualties and losses
Unknown	1,500

The siege of Mouzon was fought in eastern France during the Franco-Spanish War in 1653 a battle at the siege of the fortress of Mouzon. The battle took place shortly after Viscount Turenne launched a mobile defence against the invading Spanish army, which was facing Rocroi. The town was besieged.

Leopold William commanded about 34,000 Spanish troops, who began to invade France from the Flanders region in the summer of 1653 and obtained the help of the Prince de Condé. The commander-in-chief of the French army, Viscount of Turenne, had only more than one-third of the enemy's troops, so he chose to attack near the huge enemy force. Carry out a large number of manoeuvres and counter-movements to deny the enemy the opportunity to capture important positions. When the Spanish army began to besiege Rocroi, Turenne was well aware of the French army's numerical disadvantage and decided not to carry out a relief operation, but to make up for its strategic disadvantage by capturing Mouzon.

This is a very strategic fortress on the Meuse River, located between Sedan and Stenay. After a seventeen-day siege, the French successfully captured the city. According to Duke of York, since he did not have any engineers, Viscount of Turenne had to draw up the plans himself and Supervise all siege works during the siege.

== Sources ==
- Decroos, P. (1871). Histoire générale de la France du nord.
- Longueville, Thomas (1907). Marshal Turenne (Robarts - University of Toronto ed.). London: Longmans, Green.
- Ramsey, Andrew Michael (1735). James II, King of England; La Moussaye, François de Goyon de Matignon. The history of Henri de La Tour d'Auvergne, viscount de Turenne, marshal-general of France ...
