= Le Plessis =

Le Plessis is part of the name of 23 communes of France:

- Le Plessis-aux-Bois in the Seine-et-Marne département
- Le Plessis-Belleville in the Oise département
- Le Plessis-Bouchard in the Val-d'Oise département
- Le Plessis-Brion in the Oise département
- Le Plessis-Dorin in the Loir-et-Cher département
- Le Plessis-Feu-Aussoux in the Seine-et-Marne département
- Le Plessis-Gassot in the Val-d'Oise département
- Le Plessis-Grammoire in the Maine-et-Loire département
- Le Plessis-Grimoult in the Calvados département
- Le Plessis-Grohan in the Eure département
- Le Plessis-Hébert in the Eure département
- Le Plessis-l'Échelle in the Loir-et-Cher département
- Le Plessis-l'Évêque in the Seine-et-Marne département
- Le Plessis-Lastelle in the Manche département
- Le Plessis-Luzarches in the Val-d'Oise département
- Le Plessis-Macé in the Maine-et-Loire département
- Le Plessis-Pâté in the Essonne département
- Le Plessis-Patte-d'Oie in the Oise département
- Le Plessis-Placy in the Seine-et-Marne département
- Le Plessis-Robinson in the Hauts-de-Seine département
- Le Plessis-Sainte-Opportune in the Eure département
- Le Plessis-Trévise in the Val-de-Marne département
- Tellières-le-Plessis in the Orne département
