= Pierre Landry =

Pierre Landry may refer to:

- Pierre Henri Landry (1899–1990), tennis player
- Pierre Caliste Landry (1841–1921), state legislator in Louisiana
- Pierre-Amand Landry (1846–1916), Acadian lawyer, judge and political figure in New Brunswick
