= César Gabriel de Choiseul, Duke of Praslin =

French politician (1712–1785)

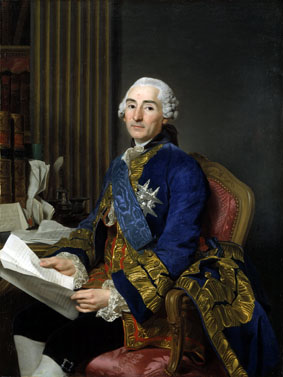
César Gabriel de Choiseul, Duke of Praslin, French diplomat and statesman

César Gabriel de Choiseul, Duke of Praslin (French pronunciation: [sezaʁ ɡabʁijɛl də ʃwazœl dyk də pʁalɛ̃], 15 August 1712 – 15 November 1785) was a French officer, diplomat and statesman.

== Early life ==
Born into an illustrious House of Choiseul, he was the elder son of Hubert de Choiseul, Marquis de Choiseul, Count de La Rivière (d. 1727) and his wife, Henriette Louise de Beauvau (d. 1737).

== Career ==
After having served in the Army, he was appointed in 1756 ambassador in Vienna to Emperor Francis I and Queen Maria Theresa of Hungary. In 1761, he was plenipotentiary to the Augsburg Convention.

From 13 October 1761 to 8 April 1766, he served as Secretary of State (minister) for Foreign Affairs, replacing in this office his cousin Étienne de Choiseul (who became in 1763 Secretary of State for War and for Navy). He was lieutenant general of the Armies. In 1763, he was made duke of Praslin and peer of France. He negotiated the peace that ended the Seven Years' War and was Louis XV's plenipotentiary for the conclusion of the Treaty of Paris, which he signed, on 10 February 1763.

From 10 April 1766 to 24 December 1770, he served as Secretary of State for the Navy (his cousin Étienne then taking back the department of Foreign Affairs in addition to that of War). During his term in office, he restored the strength of the Navy, which had been severely damaged during the Seven Years' War. After the death, in 1764, of Madame de Pompadour, who had been their protector, the position of César Gabriel and his cousin Étienne was undermined. He fell from grace in Louis XV's court and withdrew from public affairs in 1770, at the height of the Falkland Crisis involving Britain and Spain. He was replaced at the Navy by abbé Terray.

His titles included marquis of Choiseul, count of Chevigny and of La Rivière, viscount of Melun and of Vaux, baron of La Flèche and of Giry, lord of Chassy. He was made a knight of the Order of the Holy Spirit on 1 January 1762. He was made an honorary member of the Academy of Sciences on 15 December 1769.

Praslin Island, one of the Seychelles, was named after him. The villages of Choiseul and Praslin in Saint Lucia are also named after him.

== Personal life ==
On 30 April 1732, he married Anne Marie de Champagne (1714-1783). They had a son and a daughter:

1. Renaud César de Choiseul, Duke of Praslin (1735-1791); married in 1754 Guyonne Marguerite de Durfort (1739-1806) and had issue
2. Elisabeth Céleste Adélaide de Choiseul (1737-1768); married in 1752 Florent Alexandre Melchior de La Baume, Count of Montrevel (d. 1794); they divorced in 1760 without issue

French nobility
New creation	Duke of Praslin; 1762 – 1785	Succeeded by Renaud César de Choiseul-Praslin
