= Sexfontaines =

- Commune
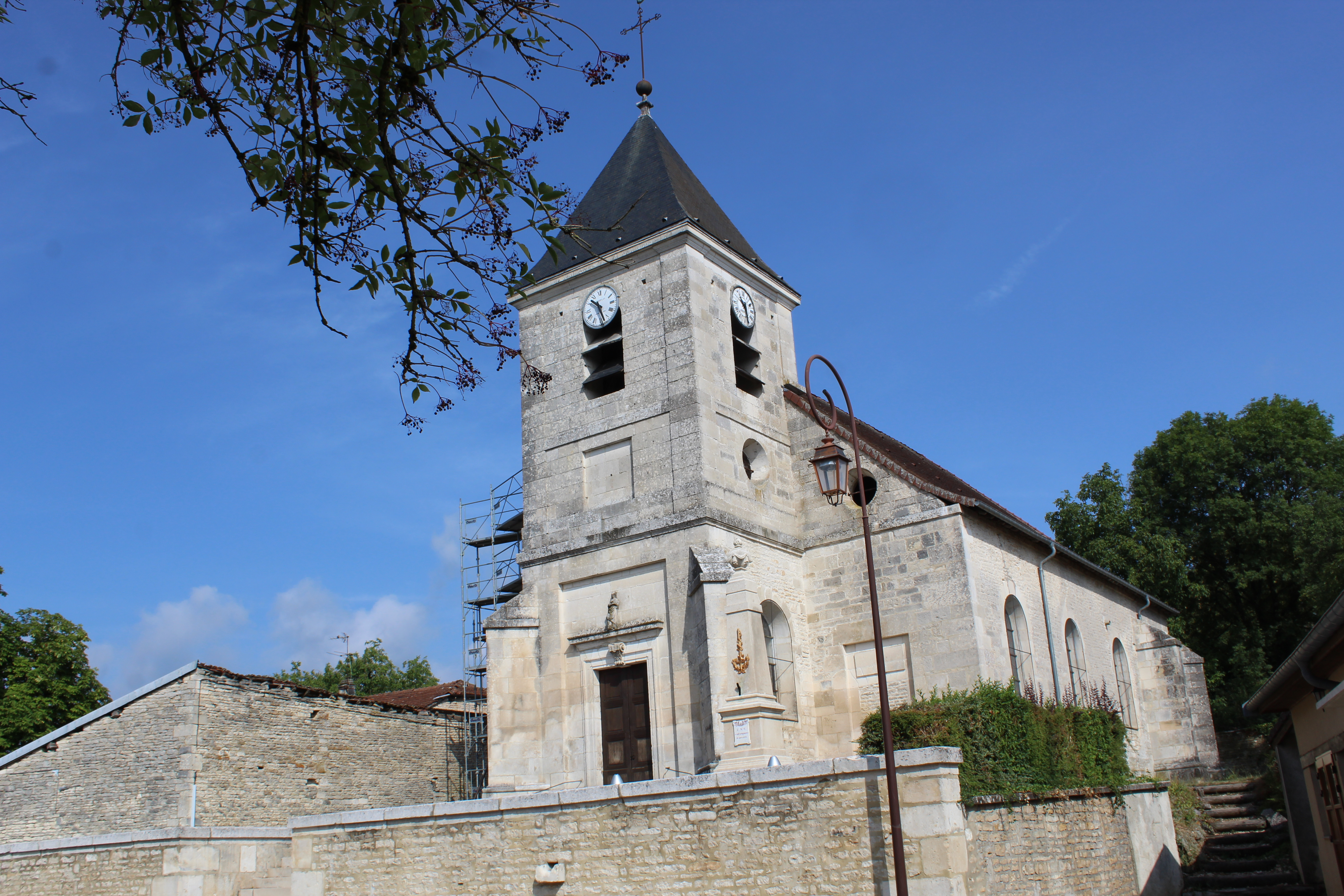
- The church in Sexfontaines

- Coat of arms
- Location of Sexfontaines
- Location within France Location within Grand Est
- Coordinates: 48°12′07″N 5°02′25″E
- Country: France
- Region: Grand Est
- Department: Haute-Marne
- Arrondissement: Chaumont
- Canton: Bologne
- Intercommunality: CA Chaumont

Government
  - Mayor (2020–2026): Jean-Paul Dieudonné
- Area^{1}: 20.77 km^{2} (8.02 sq mi)
- Elevation: 400 m (1,300 ft)
- Population (2023): 143
  - Density: 6.88/km^{2} (17.8/sq mi)
- Time zone: UTC+01:00 (CET)
  - Summer (DST): UTC+02:00 (CEST)
- INSEE/Postal code: 52472 /52330
- ^{1} French Land Register data, which excludes lakes, ponds, glaciers > 1 km^{2} (0.386 sq mi or 247 acres) and river estuaries.

Sexfontaines is a commune in the Haute-Marne department in north-eastern France.

== See also ==
- Communes of the Haute-Marne department
