= Erik du Plessis =

Erik du Plessis was the Chairman of Millward Brown South Africa and author of "The Advertised Mind: Groundbreaking Insights into How Our Brains Respond to Advertising," 2005. He specialized in brand and advertising research. Erik was a guest professor at the Copenhagen Business School. Du Plessis formerly ran his own research company, Impact Information, in South Africa.

== The Advertised Mind ==
Compiling research performed by du Plessis and Millward Brown, "The Advertised Mind" theorizes that the strongest factor in successful marketing is whether an advertisement creates an emotional response in its target audience. du Plessis bases his conclusions on recent discoveries in neuroscience—particularly the limbic system—which suggest that emotion establishes a firm memory of an advertisement and predisposes consumers to buy the brand that is being advertised. du Plessis also refers to Adtrack's database of responses to over 30,000 TV commercials, and explores how this paradigm shift can maximize return on advertising spend.

== The Branded Mind ==
In 2011, du Plessis wrote a follow-up book called "The Branded Mind: What Neuroscience Really Tells Us About the Puzzle of the Brain and Brand."

"The Branded Mind" examines the neuroscience of brand decisions, taking the position that brand decisions were largely dependent on homeostatic factors. In "The Branded Mind," du Plessis also discusses how both emotion and rationality factors come into play when a consumer is deciding which brand to pick. Du Plessis also offers some insight in his book on the ways in which emotions, moods, personality, and culture impact our brand decisions.

== Publications ==
Advertised Mind: Groundbreaking Insights into how Our Brains Respond to Advertising, Kogan Page Limited, 2005
