= Bassoncourt =

- Commune
- Location of Bassoncourt
- Location within France Location within Grand Est
- Coordinates: 48°04′06″N 5°33′37″E
- Country: France
- Region: Grand Est
- Department: Haute-Marne
- Arrondissement: Chaumont
- Canton: Poissons

Government
  - Mayor (2020–2026): Béatrice Bourg
- Area^{1}: 6.49 km^{2} (2.51 sq mi)
- Elevation: 345 m (1,132 ft)
- Population (2023): 62
  - Density: 9.6/km^{2} (25/sq mi)
- Time zone: UTC+01:00 (CET)
  - Summer (DST): UTC+02:00 (CEST)
- INSEE/Postal code: 52038 /52240
- ^{1} French Land Register data, which excludes lakes, ponds, glaciers > 1 km^{2} (0.386 sq mi or 247 acres) and river estuaries.

Bassoncourt (French pronunciation: [basɔ̃kuʁ]) is a commune in the Haute-Marne department in the Grand Est region in northeastern France.

== Population ==
Historical population
Year	Pop.	±% p.a.
1968	119	—
1975	114	−0.61%
1982	101	−1.71%
1990	77	−3.33%
1999	73	−0.59%
2007	69	−0.70%
2012	67	−0.59%
2017	67	+0.00%
2023	62	−1.28%
Source: INSEE

== See also ==
- Communes of the Haute-Marne department
