= Claude Antoine Gabriel de Choiseul, Duke of Choiseul =

French soldier and royalist (1760–1838)

Claude Antoine Gabriel de Choiseul
- Duke of Choiseul
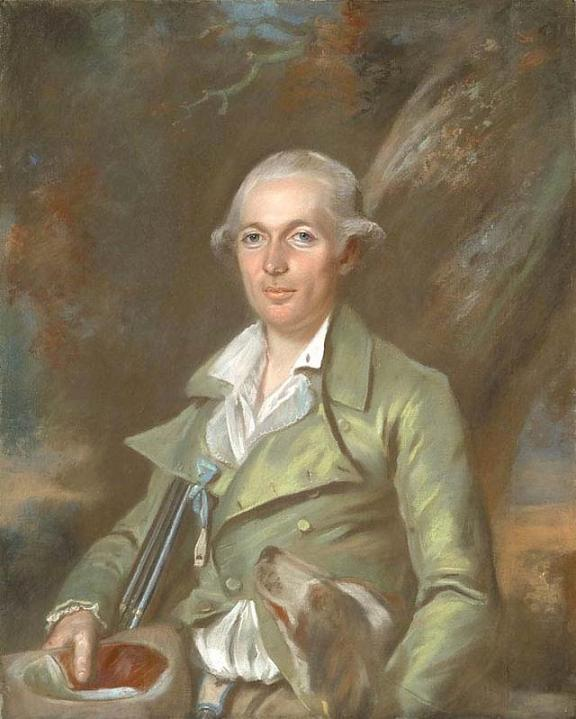
- The Duke of Choiseul by Claude Hoin.
- Full name: Claude Antoine Gabriel de Choiseul
- Born: 26 August 1760; Lunéville, France
- Died: 1 December 1838 (aged 78); Paris, France
- Spouse: Marie Stéphanie de Choiseul (6 October 1778)
- Issue: Stéphanie, Duchess of Marmier
- Father: Claude Antoine, Count of Choiseul
- Mother: Diane Gabrielle de La Baume

Claude Antoine Gabriel de Choiseul, Duke of Choiseul (26 August 1760, Lunéville – 1 December 1838) was a French soldier and émigré Royalist.

== Biography ==
He was brought up at Chanteloup, under the care of his relative, Etienne François, duc de Choiseul, who was childless. In 1778, he married his cousin, Marie Stephanie de Choiseul, daughter of Etienne's younger brother Jacques Philippe de Choiseul, marquis de Stainville. The latter had only daughters, so Claude became heir to the family titles.

When the French Revolution erupted, he was a colonel of Dragoons, and throughout the following period, he remained a royalist. Choiseul-Stainville took part in the attempt of King Louis XVI to escape from Paris on 20 June 1791, was arrested with the king, and imprisoned (see Flight to Varennes). Liberated in May 1792, he fled France in October, and fought in the émigré army of Louis Joseph de Bourbon, prince de Condé against the French Republic. Captured in 1795, he was confined at Dunkirk, escaped, set sail for India, was wrecked on the French coast, and condemned to death by the decree of the French Directory. Nevertheless, he was fortunate enough to escape once more.

Napoleon Bonaparte allowed him to return to France in 1801, but he remained in private life until the fall of the First French Empire in 1815. After the Bourbon Restoration he was called to the new Chambre des Pairs (House of Peers) by King Louis XVIII. During the Revolution of 1830, he was nominated a member of the provisional government. He afterwards received from Louis Philippe I the post of aide-de-camp to the king and governor of the Louvre Palace. He died in Paris eight years later.

== Marriage ==
On 6 October 1778 he married Marie Stéphanie de Choiseul (1763–1833) daughter of Jacques Philippe de Choiseul, Duke of Stainville and had two children.

== Children ==
1. Jacqueline Béatrix Gabrielle Stéphanie de Choiseul (24 February 1782 - 13 March 1861) married Philippe Gabriel, Duke of Marmier and had children.
2. Étienne de Choiseul (1786 - died in battle in 1809)

== Honours ==
- 1833: Grand cordon of the Order of Leopold.
