= Jacques Philippe de Choiseul, Duke of Stainville =

French Marshal of France, general and nobleman

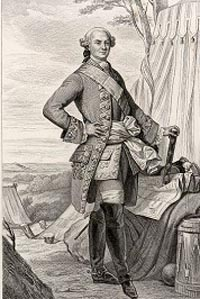

Jacques Philippe de Choiseul, Duke of Stainville (6 September 1727, Lunéville – 2 June 1789, Strasbourg) was a French Marshal of France, general and nobleman. He became count and then in 1786 duke of Stainville (inheriting it from his elder brother Étienne François, duc de Choiseul) and baron of Dommanges.

== Life ==
Jacques Philippe came from the House of Choiseul, a noble family dating back to the 12th century and originating in Choiseul in Haute-Marne. This famous family produced five marshals, one cardinal, two bishops and several statesmen. As a young man he served in the army of empress Maria Theresa and after becoming captain in a dragoon regiment he was made a commander of the Order of Saint Stephen, chamberlain to Francis I, Holy Roman Emperor, colonel of a regiment of light cavalry, major general and lieutenant field marshal in 1759.

In 1760 he resigned his imperial titles and joined the French army, in which he was made lieutenant general. He was put under the command of the marshal de Broglie. He continued serving in Germany until the end of the Seven Years' War and was giving the posts of commanding inspector of the French grenadier regiment (régiment des grenadiers de France) and inspector general of infantry

In 1770 he was made governor general of Lorraine, where he had a triumphal arch (Porte Saint-Louis) built, and on 13 June 1783 he was made marshal of France. In 1788 he was made governor general of Alsace. He was made knight of the Orders of the King on 2 February 1786 and 'brevet' duke of Stainville the same year. He died at Strasbourg at 1789 aged 61.

His daughter Marie Thérèse de Choiseul married Prince Joseph of Monaco.

== Bibliography ==
- Charles Gavard, Galeries historiques du Palais de Versailles, vol. 7, Imprimerie royale, 1842;
- Michel Popoff et préface d'Hervé Pinoteau, Armorial de l'Ordre du Saint-Esprit : d'après l'œuvre du père Anselme et ses continuateurs, Paris, Le Léopard d'or, 1996, 204 p. (ISBN 2-86377-140-X);
- Jean-Baptiste Rietstap, Armorial général, t. (tome 1 et 2), Gouda, G.B. van Goor zonen, 1884-1887 et ses Compléments sur www.euraldic.com.
