= Faucogney-et-la-Mer =

- Commune
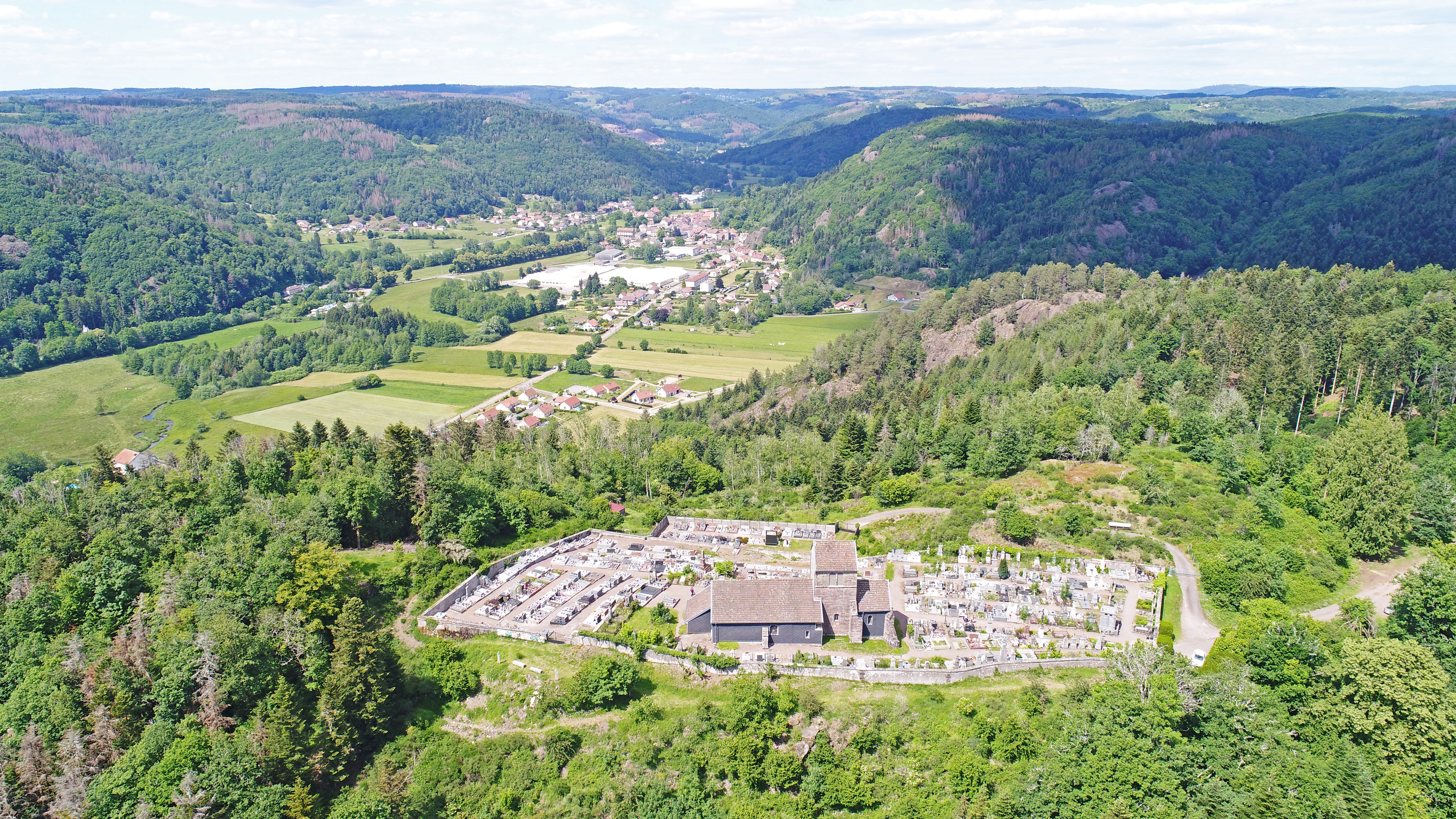
- A general view of Faucogney

- Coat of arms
- Location of Faucogney-et-la-Mer
- Location within France Location within Bourgogne-Franche-Comté
- Coordinates: 47°50′34″N 6°33′51″E
- Country: France
- Region: Bourgogne-Franche-Comté
- Department: Haute-Saône
- Arrondissement: Lure
- Canton: Mélisey

Government
  - Mayor (2025–2026): Catherine Vuillemard
- Area^{1}: 14.14 km^{2} (5.46 sq mi)
- Highest elevation: 573 m (1,880 ft)
- Lowest elevation: 352 m (1,155 ft)
- Population (2023): 454
  - Density: 32.1/km^{2} (83.2/sq mi)
- Time zone: UTC+01:00 (CET)
  - Summer (DST): UTC+02:00 (CEST)
- INSEE/Postal code: 70227 /70310
- ^{1} French Land Register data, which excludes lakes, ponds, glaciers > 1 km^{2} (0.386 sq mi or 247 acres) and river estuaries.

Faucogney-et-la-Mer (French pronunciation: [fokɔɲɛ e la mɛʁ]) is a commune in the Haute-Saône department in the region of Bourgogne-Franche-Comté in eastern France.

== See also ==
- Communes of the Haute-Saône department
