= Clefmont =

- Commune
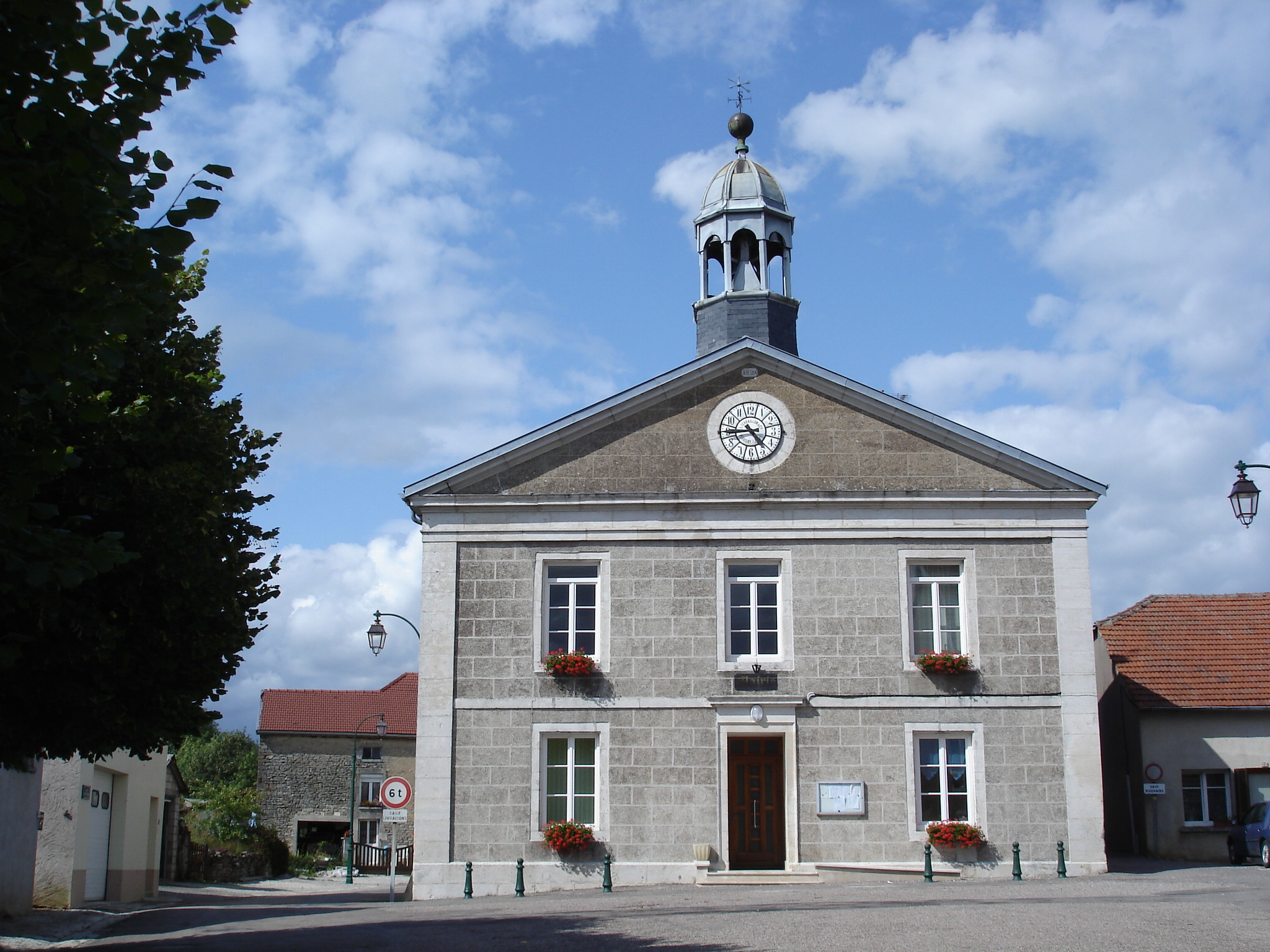
- The town hall in Clefmont

- Coat of arms
- Location of Clefmont
- Location within France Location within Grand Est
- Coordinates: 48°05′48″N 5°30′41″E
- Country: France
- Region: Grand Est
- Department: Haute-Marne
- Arrondissement: Chaumont
- Canton: Bourbonne-les-Bains
- Intercommunality: Grand Langres

Government
  - Mayor (2020–2026): François Chittaro
- Area^{1}: 19.33 km^{2} (7.46 sq mi)
- Elevation: 478 m (1,568 ft)
- Population (2023): 151
  - Density: 7.81/km^{2} (20.2/sq mi)
- Time zone: UTC+01:00 (CET)
  - Summer (DST): UTC+02:00 (CEST)
- INSEE/Postal code: 52132 /52240
- ^{1} French Land Register data, which excludes lakes, ponds, glaciers > 1 km^{2} (0.386 sq mi or 247 acres) and river estuaries.

Clefmont is a commune in the Haute-Marne department in north-eastern France.

== See also ==
- Communes of the Haute-Marne department
