= Aigremont, Haute-Marne =

Aigremont
- Commune
- Coat of arms
- Location of Aigremont
- Location within France Location within Grand Est
- Coordinates: 48°01′01″N 5°43′05″E
- Country: France
- Region: Grand Est
- Department: Haute-Marne
- Arrondissement: Langres
- Canton: Bourbonne-les-Bains
- Intercommunality: Les Savoir-Faire

Government
  - Mayor (2020–2026): Robert Lefaivre
- Area^{1}: 4.87 km^{2} (1.88 sq mi)
- Elevation: 430 m (1,410 ft)
- Population (2023): 23
  - Density: 4.7/km^{2} (12/sq mi)
- Time zone: UTC+01:00 (CET)
  - Summer (DST): UTC+02:00 (CEST)
- INSEE/Postal code: 52002 /52400
- ^{1} French Land Register data, which excludes lakes, ponds, glaciers > 1 km^{2} (0.386 sq mi or 247 acres) and river estuaries.

Aigremont (French pronunciation: [ɛɡʁəmɔ̃]) is a commune in the Haute-Marne department in Grand Est region in northeastern France.

== Population ==
Historical population
Year	Pop.	±% p.a.
1968	44	—
1975	31	−4.88%
1982	23	−4.17%
1990	19	−2.36%
1999	18	−0.60%
2007	22	+2.54%
2012	22	+0.00%
2017	20	−1.89%
2023	23	+2.36%
Source: INSEE

== See also ==
- Communes of the Haute-Marne department
