= Daillecourt =

- Commune
- Location of Daillecourt
- Location within France Location within Grand Est
- Coordinates: 48°04′36″N 5°30′18″E
- Country: France
- Region: Grand Est
- Department: Haute-Marne
- Arrondissement: Chaumont
- Canton: Bourbonne-les-Bains
- Intercommunality: Grand Langres

Government
  - Mayor (2020–2026): Annick Masson
- Area^{1}: 7.37 km^{2} (2.85 sq mi)
- Elevation: 385 m (1,263 ft)
- Population (2023): 72
  - Density: 9.8/km^{2} (25/sq mi)
- Time zone: UTC+01:00 (CET)
  - Summer (DST): UTC+02:00 (CEST)
- INSEE/Postal code: 52161 /52240
- ^{1} French Land Register data, which excludes lakes, ponds, glaciers > 1 km^{2} (0.386 sq mi or 247 acres) and river estuaries.

Daillecourt (French pronunciation: [dajkuʁ]) is a commune in the Haute-Marne département in north-eastern France.

== Population ==
Historical population
Year	Pop.	±% p.a.
1968	139	—
1975	112	−3.04%
1982	131	+2.26%
1990	107	−2.50%
1999	90	−1.90%
2007	79	−1.62%
2012	84	+1.23%
2017	74	−2.50%
2023	72	−0.46%
Source: INSEE

== See also ==
- Communes of the Haute-Marne department
