= Choiseul, Haute-Marne =

Choiseul
- Commune
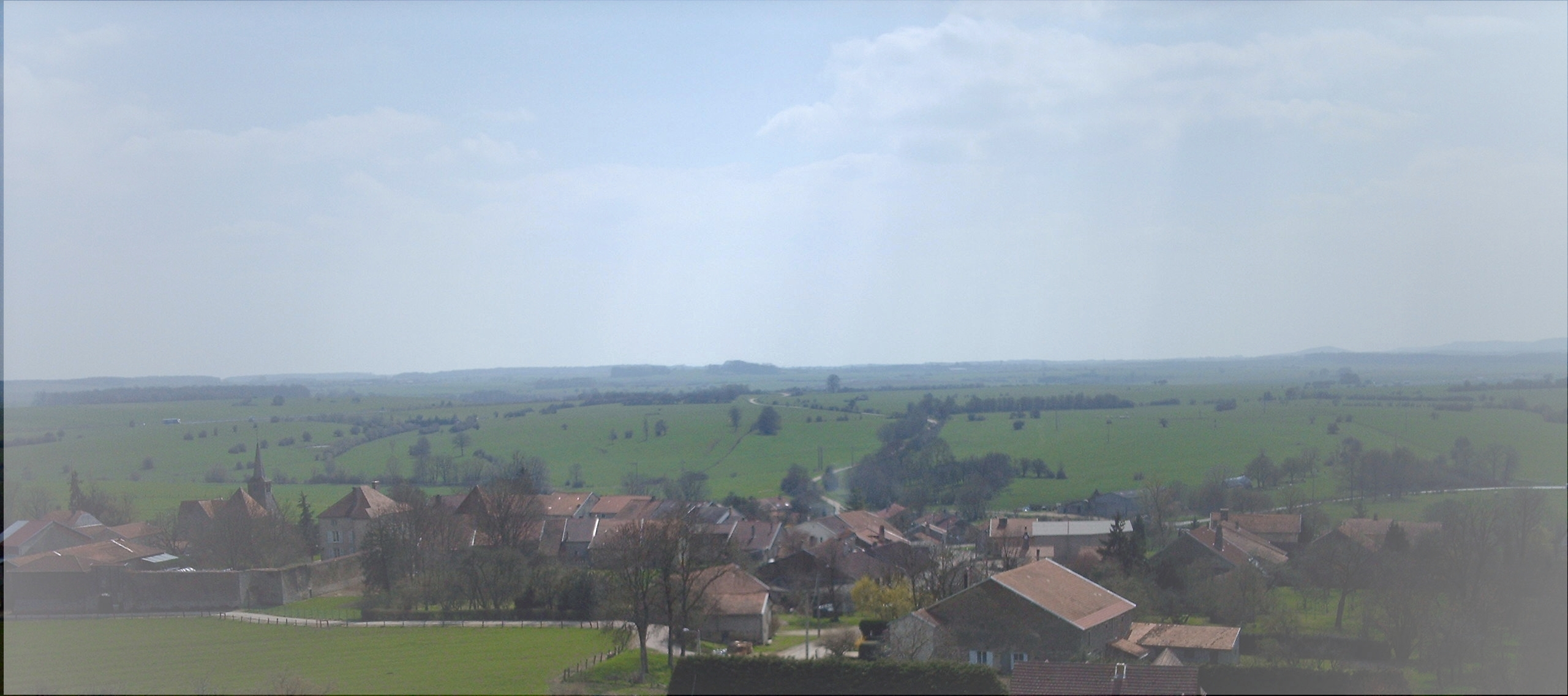
- Village of Choiseul

- Coat of arms
- Location of Choiseul
- Location within France Location within Grand Est
- Coordinates: 48°03′32″N 5°34′06″E
- Country: France
- Region: Grand Est
- Department: Haute-Marne
- Arrondissement: Chaumont
- Canton: Bourbonne-les-Bains
- Intercommunality: Grand Langres

Government
  - Mayor (2020–2026): Patrick Parisel
- Area^{1}: 8.63 km^{2} (3.33 sq mi)
- Elevation: 350 m (1,150 ft)
- Population (2023): 80
  - Density: 9.3/km^{2} (24/sq mi)
- Time zone: UTC+01:00 (CET)
  - Summer (DST): UTC+02:00 (CEST)
- INSEE/Postal code: 52127 /52240
- ^{1} French Land Register data, which excludes lakes, ponds, glaciers > 1 km^{2} (0.386 sq mi or 247 acres) and river estuaries.

Choiseul (French pronunciation: [ʃwazœl]) is a commune in the Haute-Marne department in north-eastern France.

== See also ==
- Communes of the Haute-Marne department
- Renard II of Choiseul
