= César de Choiseul, 1st Duke of Choiseul =

French diplomat

César de Choiseul
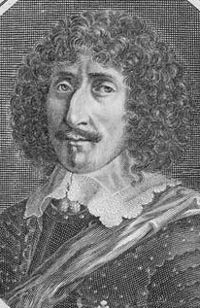
- César de Choiseul
- Born: 12 February 1598
- Died: 23 December 1675 (aged 77); Paris
- Military career
- Allegiance: France
- Branch: Army
- Service years: 1616–1650
- Rank: Marshal of France 1645
- Conflicts: Anglo-French War (1627–1629); Franco-Spanish War (1635–1659); The Fronde (1648-1653)

César de Choiseul
- 1st Duke of Choiseul
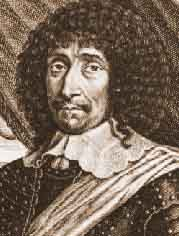
- Full name: César de Choiseul
- Born: 12 February 1598; Paris, France
- Died: 23 December 1675 (aged 77); Paris, France
- Spouse: Colombe de Charron (2 August 1625)
- Issue: César, Abbot of the Abbey of Saint-Sauveur de Redon; Alexandre, Count of Choiseul; César Auguste, Duke of Choiseul
- Father: Ferry de Choiseul, ''Seigneur of Praslin

César de Choiseul, 1st Duke of Choiseul, comte du Plessis-Praslin (12 February 1598 – 23 December 1675) was a Marshal of France and French diplomat, generally known for the best part of his life as the Maréchal (Marshal) du Plessis-Praslin.

A member of the illustrious House of Choiseul, which arose in the valley of the Upper Marne in the 10th century and divided into many branches, three of them whose names (Hostel, Praslin and du Plessis) were borne, at one time or another, by César. Entering the army at the age of fourteen as proprietary colonel of an infantry regiment, he shared almost all the exploits of the French Royal Army during the reign of Louis XIII. He took part in the Siege of La Rochelle as well as in the defence of the Isle of Ré and Isle of Oléron against the English under the Duke of Buckingham, and accompanied the French forces to Italy in 1629.

In 1630 he became the French ambassador to the court of Duke Victor Amadeus I of Savoy, and engaged in diplomatic and administrative work in Italy until 1635, when the Franco-Spanish War broke out. In the war that followed, Plessis-Praslin distinguished himself in various battles and sieges in Italy, including the action called the "Route de Quiers" and the celebrated four-cornered operations round Turin. In 1640 he became governor of Turin, and in 1642 lieutenant-general, and after further service in Italy he became a Marshal of France (1645) and second in command in Catalonia, where he took Roses.

During the first war of the Fronde (1648–1649), he assisted Condé in the brief siege of Paris (January 1649); and in the second war of the Fronde (1650–1653), remaining loyal to the queen regent Anne of Austria and the court party, he won his greatest triumph when he defeated an army of rebels and Spaniards led by Turenne at the Battle of Rethel (or Blanc-Champ) in 1650.

He then held high office at the court of Louis XIV, became minister of state in 1652, and in November 1665 was created duc de Choiseul. He was concerned in some of the negotiations between Louis and Charles II of England which led to the treaty of Dover (1670), and died in Paris on 23 December 1675.

Food historians generally attribute the "invention" of praline to Lassagne, officer of the table to Marechal du Plessis, duke of Choiseul-Praslin
