= Val des Écoliers =

Val des Écoliers ('valley of scholars') may refer to:

- Order of Val des Écoliers
- Abbey of Val des Écoliers, Liège
- Abbey of Val des Écoliers, Mons
- Abbey of Val des Écoliers, Verbiesles
