= John of Châtillon (theologian) =

John of Châtillon (died 6 July 1298) was a canon of the Order of Val des Écoliers and a regent master of theology at the University of Paris.

John was a canon at the convent of Sainte-Catherine by 1288, when he attended the inventorying of the convent's library. He incepted as a Master of Theology at Paris under either Gregory of Burgundy or Laurence of Poulangy. He succeeded the latter in his order's chair at Paris when Laurence became prior of Verbiesles in 1297. That year, he served as executor for Thierry de Saint-Véran, archdeacon of Évreux. He died the next year and was succeeded by John of Bray. The general chapter of Val des Écoliers held in 1299 ordered the celebration of his anniversary.

John has been identified with the anonymous master of Val des Écoliers (Magister de Valle Scholarium) who took part in a quodlibet from which two questions are preserved in the collection of Nicholas of Bar. Palémon Glorieux dates the quodlibet to 1294–1295. Both the identification and the dating are uncertain. The quodlibet may belong to Laurence of Poulangy.

John of Châtillon of Val des Écoliers is a different person from the Dominican of the same name (fl. 1267–1281) who was provincial master of France and from the Franciscan of the same name known from two sermons dated 1272–1273.

== Bibliography ==
- Glorieux, Palémon (1935). La littérature quodlibétique de 1260 à 1320. Vol. 2. Le Saulchoir.
- Guyon, Catherine (1998). Les écoliers du Christ: l'ordre canonial du Val des Ecoliers, 1201–1539. CERCOR.
- Piron, Sylvain (2007). "Nicholas of Bar's Collection". In Schabel, Christopher (ed.). Theological Quodlibeta in the Middle Ages: The Fourteenth Century. Brill. pp. 333–343.
- Sullivan, Thomas (2007). "The Quodlibeta of the Canons Regular and the Monks". In Schabel, Christopher (ed.). Theological Quodlibeta in the Middle Ages: The Fourteenth Century. Brill. pp. 359–400.
