= Chaumont, Haute-Marne =

Chaumont
- Prefecture and commune
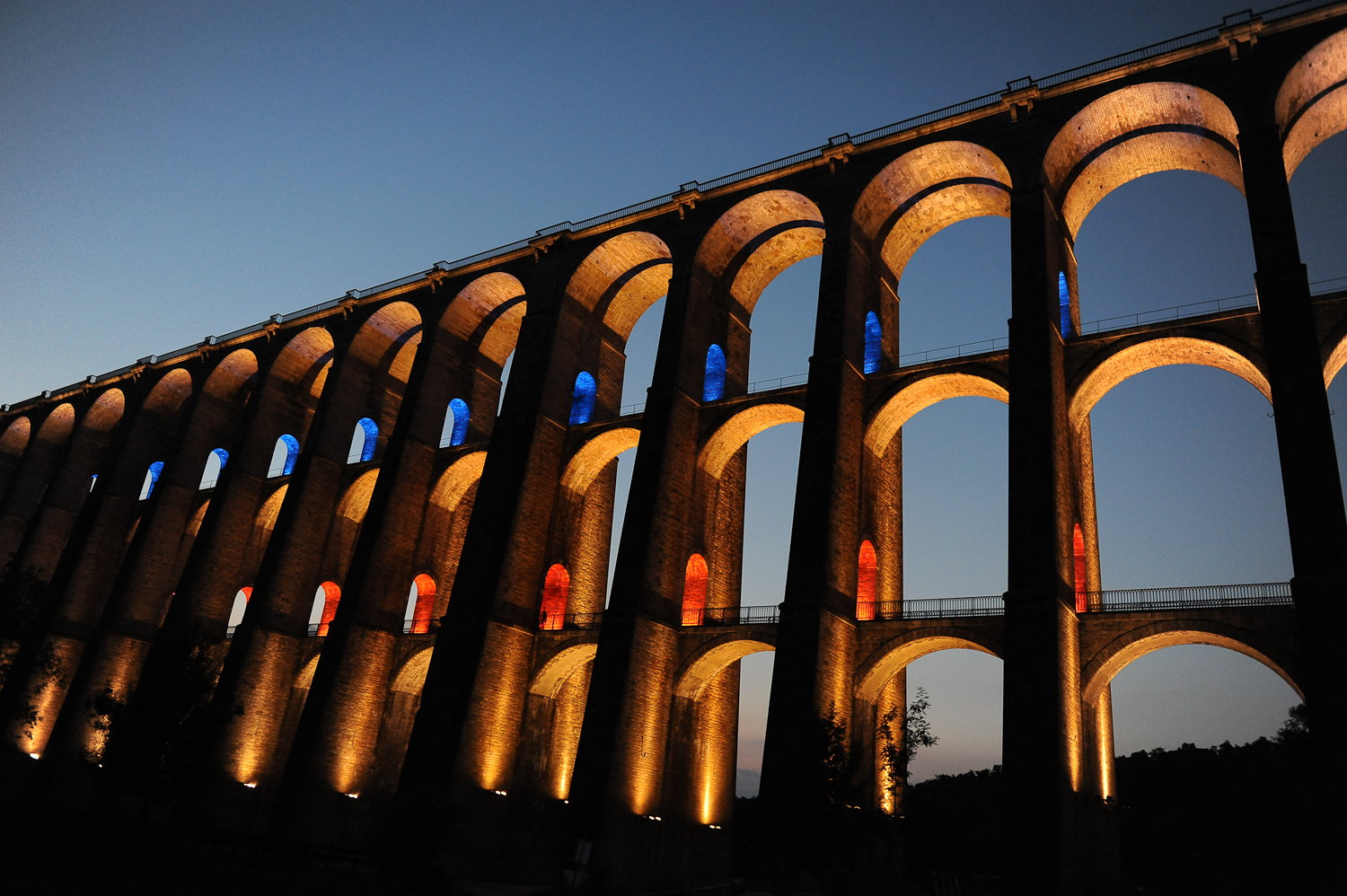
- The Chaumont viaduct

- Coat of arms
- Location of Chaumont
- Location within France Location within Grand Est
- Coordinates: 48°06′42″N 5°08′20″E
- Country: France
- Region: Grand Est
- Department: Haute-Marne
- Arrondissement: Chaumont
- Canton: Chaumont-1, 2 and 3
- Intercommunality: CA Chaumont

Government
  - Mayor (2020–2026): Christine Guillemy
- Area^{1}: 55.26 km^{2} (21.34 sq mi)
- Elevation: 314 m (1,030 ft)
- Highest elevation: 416 m (1,365 ft)
- Lowest elevation: 247 m (810 ft)
- Population (2023): 20,827
  - Density: 376.9/km^{2} (976.1/sq mi)
- Time zone: UTC+01:00 (CET)
  - Summer (DST): UTC+02:00 (CEST)
- INSEE/Postal code: 52121 /52000
- Website: ville-chaumont.fr
- ^{1} French Land Register data, which excludes lakes, ponds, glaciers > 1 km^{2} (0.386 sq mi or 247 acres) and river estuaries.

Chaumont, also known Chaumont-en-Bassigny (French pronunciation: [ʃomɔ̃ ɑ̃ basiɲi]), is a commune of France, and the prefecture of the Haute-Marne department. It has a population of about 21,000.

The city stands on the river Marne and is situated on the Paris-Est–Mulhouse-Ville railway, which runs over a 52 m (171 ft) tall and 600 m (2,000 ft) long viaduct built in 1856. Chaumont station has rail connections to Paris, Reims, Dijon, Mulhouse and regional destinations.

== History ==
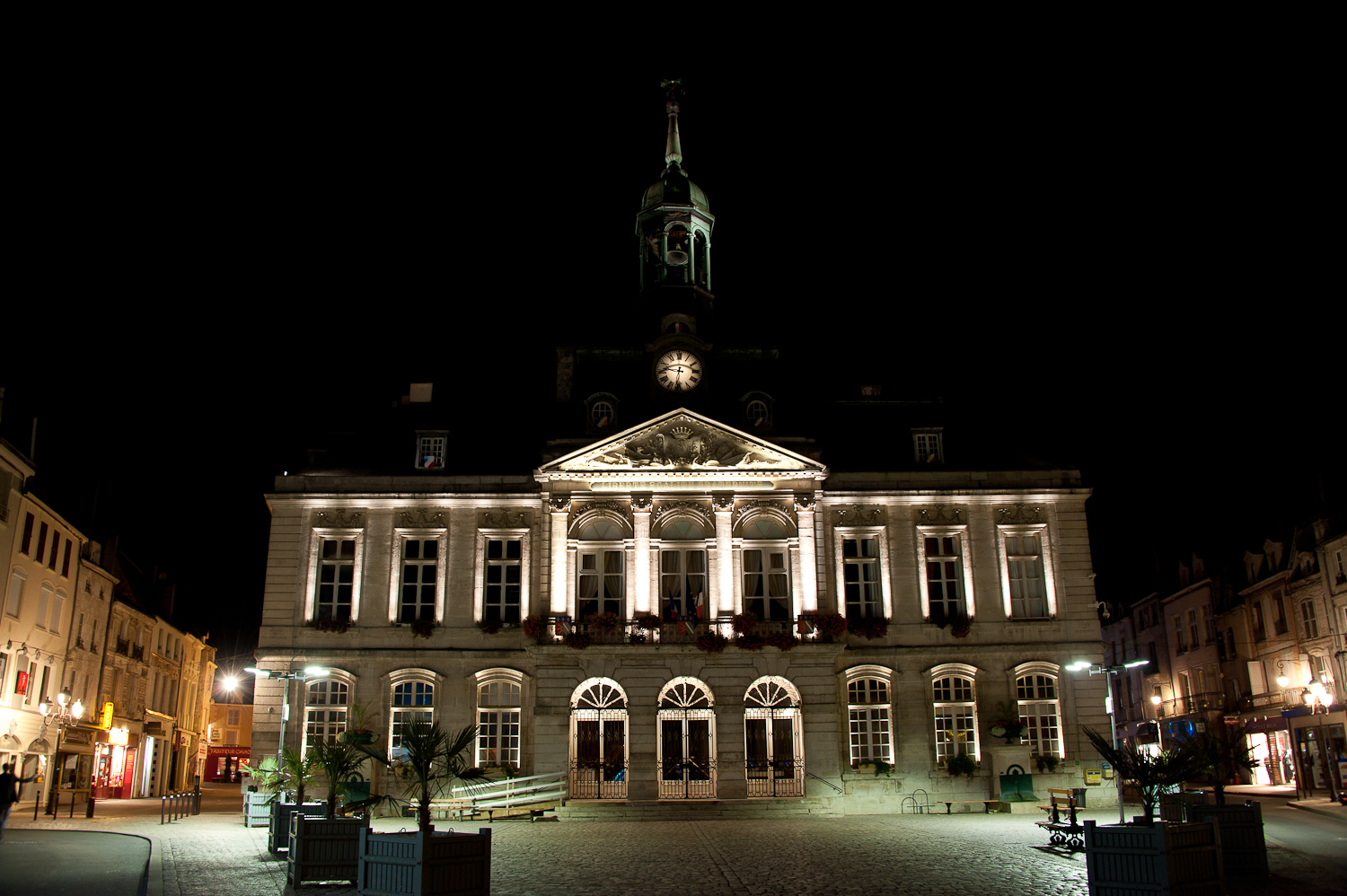
The Hôtel de Ville

Historically, Chaumont was the seat of the Counts of Bassigny and later of Champagne, receiving a charter in 1190. Much later, it was the venue of an offensive treaty against Napoleon I signed by the United Kingdom, Austria, Prussia, and Russia in 1814, by which they agreed to continue war until France returned to its 1792 boundaries.

Chaumont was bombed in 1940 and 1944 during the Second World War. From 1951 to 1967, the United States Air Force under NATO operated the Chaumont-Semoutiers Air Base on the outskirts of the city.

== Notable buildings ==
- The basilica church of St-Jean-Baptiste dates from the 13th century, the choir and lateral chapels belonging to the 15th and 16th. In the interior the sculptured triforium (15th century), the spiral staircase in the transept and a Holy Sepulchre are of interest.
- The Tour Hautefeuille (a keep of the 11th century) is the principal relic of a château of the counts of Champagne.
- The Hôtel de Ville was completed in 1790.
- In the Square Philippe-Lebon stands a statue of the engineer Philippe Lebon (1767–1804), born in Haute-Marne. The bronze statue was melted down during the Second World War and replaced by a stone copy.
- The Château du Val des Écoliers is a former monastery that served as the headquarters of the American Expeditionary Force from 1917 to 1918.

== Population ==
Historical population

Year	Pop.	±% p.a.
1793	5,253	—
1800	6,188	+2.37%
1806	6,102	−0.23%
1821	5,487	−0.71%
1831	5,965	+0.84%
1836	6,318	+1.16%
1841	6,347	+0.09%
1846	6,243	−0.33%
1851	6,374	+0.42%
1856	9,263	+7.76%
1861	7,673	−3.70%
1866	8,285	+1.55%
1872	8,500	+0.43%
1876	9,226	+2.07%
1881	12,160	+5.68%
1886	12,852	+1.11%
1891	13,280	+0.66%
1896	13,428	+0.22%
1901	14,622	+1.72%

Year	Pop.	±% p.a.
1906	14,872	+0.34%
1911	14,870	−0.00%
1921	16,210	+0.87%
1926	15,178	−1.31%
1931	15,941	+0.99%
1936	18,069	+2.54%
1946	16,851	−0.70%
1954	19,346	+1.74%
1962	21,717	+1.46%
1968	25,779	+2.90%
1975	27,226	+0.78%
1982	27,554	+0.17%
1990	27,041	−0.23%
1999	25,996	−0.44%
2007	24,321	−0.83%
2012	22,678	−1.39%
2017	21,945	−0.65%
2023	20,827	−0.87%

Source: EHESS and INSEE (1968-2023)

== Notable people ==
- Edmé Bouchardon (1698–1762), sculptor
- Luc Chatel (born 1964), politician
- Lucie Décosse (born 1981), judo player
- Denis Decrès (1761–1820), Minister of the French Navy
- André Godard (1881–1965), architect and archaeologist
- Emmanuel Guillaume-Rey (1837–1916), archaeologist, topographer and orientalist
- Jean Masson (1907–1964), politician
- Louise Michel (1830–1905), anarchist
- Charles Milesi (born 2001), professional racing driver
- Christian Pineau (1904–1995), politician
- Nicole Rieu (born 1949), singer and director
- Christian J. Robin (born 1943), orientalist and scholar
- Mary de Vitry, French person perhaps executed for gender identity

== Sport ==
The Chaumont Volley-Ball 52, is a volleyball club playing in Pro A (volleyball), created in 1996. The club became champion of France in Ligue A during the 2016–2017 season. She twice finished second in 2017-2018 and 2018–2019 seasons. On 2 April 2017, for the first time in its history, the CVB52 became a finalist in the 2016–17 CEV Challenge Cup. On 7 October 2017 in Mulhouse, the CVB52HM won a second title by becoming champion of the French Supercup. The club also participated in the CEV Champions League and CEV Cup.

The Chaumont FC, is a football club, created in 1957. Which spent 16 seasons in the second division (Ligue 2) under the name of E.C.A.C. They finished second in the 1971 season.

ECAC Rugby Chaumont, created in 1968. Playing in the 1st Grand-Est Series for the 2018–2019 season. The club finished second in the Burgundy Championship 2nd series 2018 and second in the Grand-Est Championship 2nd series 2019.

The Chaumont Handball 52 or ECAC Chaumont Handball, created in 1963. Playing in the National 2 women's season since 2018–2019.

ECAC Basket Chaumont, created in 1946. Playing in Regional Championship 2.

The Phénix de Chaumont, is an American football club playing in the Grand-Est Regional Challenge, finalist of the 2018 Grand-Est Regional Challenge championship.

La Chaumontaise Gymnastique, is a gymnastics club founded in 1883 under the name of "Gymnastics and Shooting Society"; it is also the oldest association in the town of Chaumont.

The Tomb Raiders of Chaumont, is a Roller in-line hockey and hockey club.

The Vélo Club Chaumontais is a cycling club created in 1923. The association is one of the oldest in the city.

== Twin towns – sister cities ==
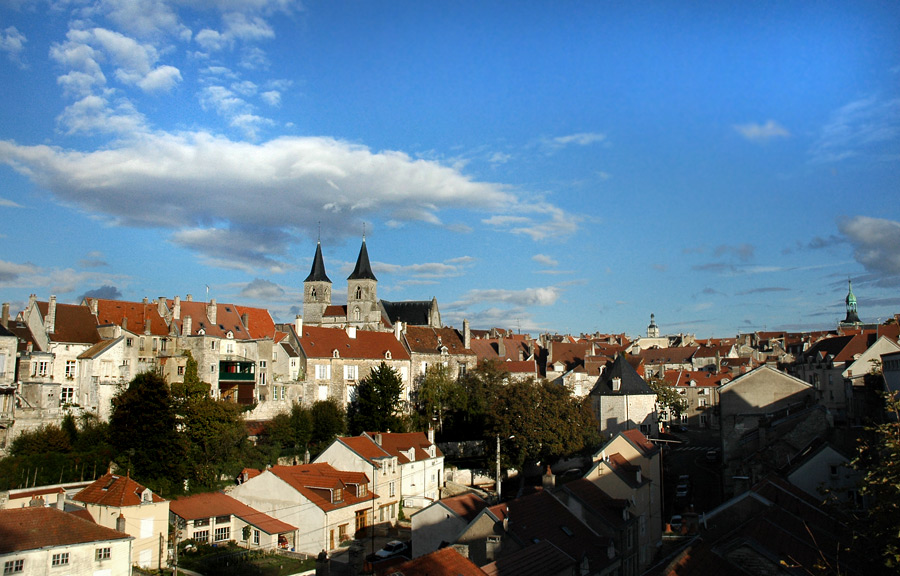
Chaumont (Haute-Marne) vieille ville

Chaumont is twinned with:

- Ashton-under-Lyne, England, United Kingdom (1956)
- Ivrea, Italy (1983)
- Bad Nauheim, Germany (1992)
- Owasso, United States (2017)

== Climate ==
Climate data for Chaumont, elevation 317 m (1,040 ft), (1991–2010 normals, extremes 1991–2016)
Month	Jan	Feb	Mar	Apr	May	Jun	Jul	Aug	Sep	Oct	Nov	Dec	Year
Record high °C (°F)	15.2 (59.4)	18.9 (66.0)	23.7 (74.7)	28.3 (82.9)	31.2 (88.2)	35.7 (96.3)	37.8 (100.0)	39.1 (102.4)	31.5 (88.7)	26.6 (79.9)	22.8 (73.0)	15.5 (59.9)	39.1 (102.4)
Mean daily maximum °C (°F)	5.4 (41.7)	7.3 (45.1)	11.3 (52.3)	15.3 (59.5)	19.7 (67.5)	22.9 (73.2)	25.3 (77.5)	25.1 (77.2)	20.1 (68.2)	15.3 (59.5)	9.1 (48.4)	5.4 (41.7)	15.2 (59.4)
Daily mean °C (°F)	2.5 (36.5)	3.8 (38.8)	6.7 (44.1)	9.9 (49.8)	14.2 (57.6)	17.2 (63.0)	19.4 (66.9)	19.2 (66.6)	15.0 (59.0)	11.2 (52.2)	6.1 (43.0)	3.0 (37.4)	10.7 (51.3)
Mean daily minimum °C (°F)	−0.3 (31.5)	0.2 (32.4)	2.1 (35.8)	4.5 (40.1)	8.8 (47.8)	11.5 (52.7)	13.5 (56.3)	13.3 (55.9)	9.9 (49.8)	7.2 (45.0)	3.2 (37.8)	0.5 (32.9)	6.2 (43.2)
Record low °C (°F)	−15.5 (4.1)	−16.2 (2.8)	−16.2 (2.8)	−5.8 (21.6)	−1.0 (30.2)	1.7 (35.1)	5.5 (41.9)	4.5 (40.1)	0.4 (32.7)	−5.1 (22.8)	−11.0 (12.2)	−18.6 (−1.5)	−18.6 (−1.5)
Average precipitation mm (inches)	71.9 (2.83)	68.9 (2.71)	68.7 (2.70)	66.6 (2.62)	79.4 (3.13)	65.9 (2.59)	90.0 (3.54)	78.9 (3.11)	75.4 (2.97)	86.6 (3.41)	85.2 (3.35)	83.5 (3.29)	921.0 (36.26)
Average precipitation days (≥ 1.0 mm)	11.4	11.2	11.2	10.9	12.1	9.7	10.7	10.1	10.1	12.2	13.6	13.0	136.0
Source: Meteociel

== See also ==
- Communes of the Haute-Marne department
