= Hôtel de Ville, Chaumont =

Town hall in Chaumont, France

Hôtel de Ville
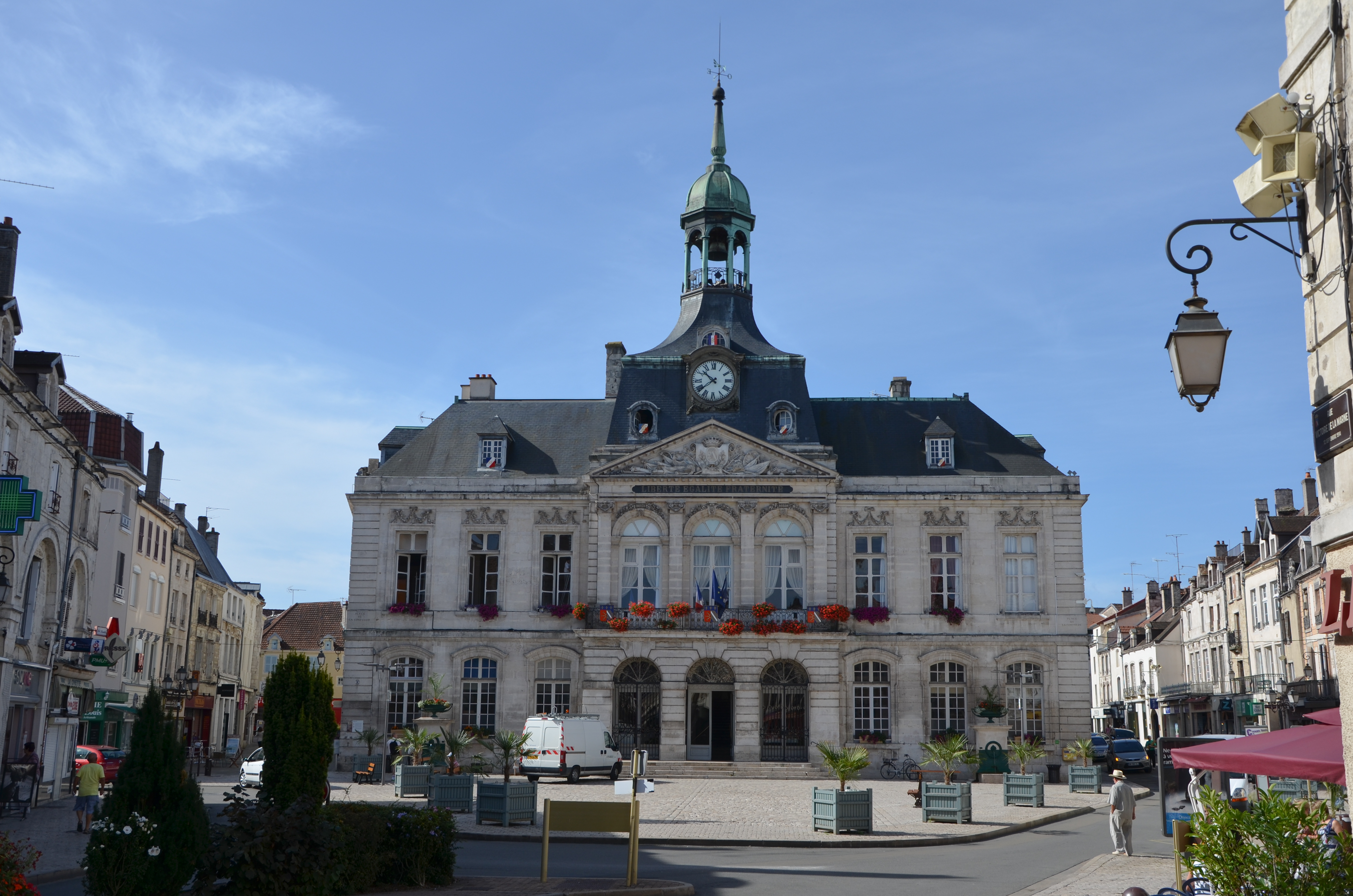
- The main frontage of the Hôtel de Ville in August 2012

General information
- Type: City hall
- Architectural style: Louis XVI style
- Location: Chaumont, France
- Coordinates: 48.1109°N 5.1395°E
- Completed: 1790

Design and construction
- Architect: François-Nicolas Lancret

Monument historique
- Official name: Hôtel de ville
- Type: Inscrit
- Designated: 1926
- Reference no.: PA00079019

The Hôtel de Ville (French pronunciation: [otɛl də vil], City Hall) is a municipal building in Chaumont, Haute-Marne, in northeastern France, standing on Place de la Concorde. It was designated a monument historique by the French government in 1926.

== History ==
Plaques in the building commemorating visits by significant dignitories

The aldermen of Chaumont established their first municipal office on the upper floor of the Porte de Barle, a gateway to the town, in 1574. However, in 1780, after finding the gateway cramped, the aldermen decided to demolish the old town gate and to commission a purpose-built town hall. Work on the new building started in 1787. It was designed by François-Nicolas Lancret in the Louis XVI style, built by Sieur Mauperrin and was officially handed over on 27 August 1790.

The design involved a symmetrical main frontage of nine bays facing onto the street. The central section of three bays, which was slightly projected forward, featured three round-headed openings with voussoirs and keystones on the ground floor, and three round-headed French doors with iron railings on the first floor. The bays on the first floor were flanked by Ionic order pilasters supporting an entablature and a modillioned pediment with a coat of arms in the tympanum. The wings were fenestrated by segmental-headed windows on the ground floor and by square-headed casement windows on the first floor. There were dormer windows at attic level and there was a steep roof, with a clock and an octagonal bell tower behind the pediment. Internally, the principal rooms were the Bureau du Maire (mayor's parlour), and the Salle des Mariages (wedding room), which was also equipped to serve as a council chamber.

After the commander of the American Expeditionary Forces, General John J. Pershing, established his headquarters at the Château du Val des Écoliers, during the latter stages of the First World War, President Woodrow Wilson visited the town hall and met civic leaders on 25 December 1918. King Albert I and Queen Elisabeth of Belgium, who also attended meetings at the Château du Val des Écoliers, visited the town hall on 20 March 1919.

After the town was liberated by troops of the US 2nd Armoured Division on 13 September 1944, during the Second World War, many local people assembled in front of the town hall to celebrate the event. The chairman of the Provisional Government, General Charles de Gaulle, visited the town hall on 21 October 1944, and General Jean de Lattre de Tassigny arrived there on 18 May 1947.

In November 2025, the council instigated an extensive programme of restoration works, including refurbishment of the slate roof, replacement of the attic floor windows and repairs to the clock, at a cost of €1.25 million.
