= Valley College =

Valley College might refer to:

- Valley College station, a stop on a bus-rapid transit line in Los Angeles
- Los Angeles Valley College, a community college
- College of the Valley Scholars (1262–1542) in Salisbury, England
