= Buxières-lès-Villiers =

- Commune
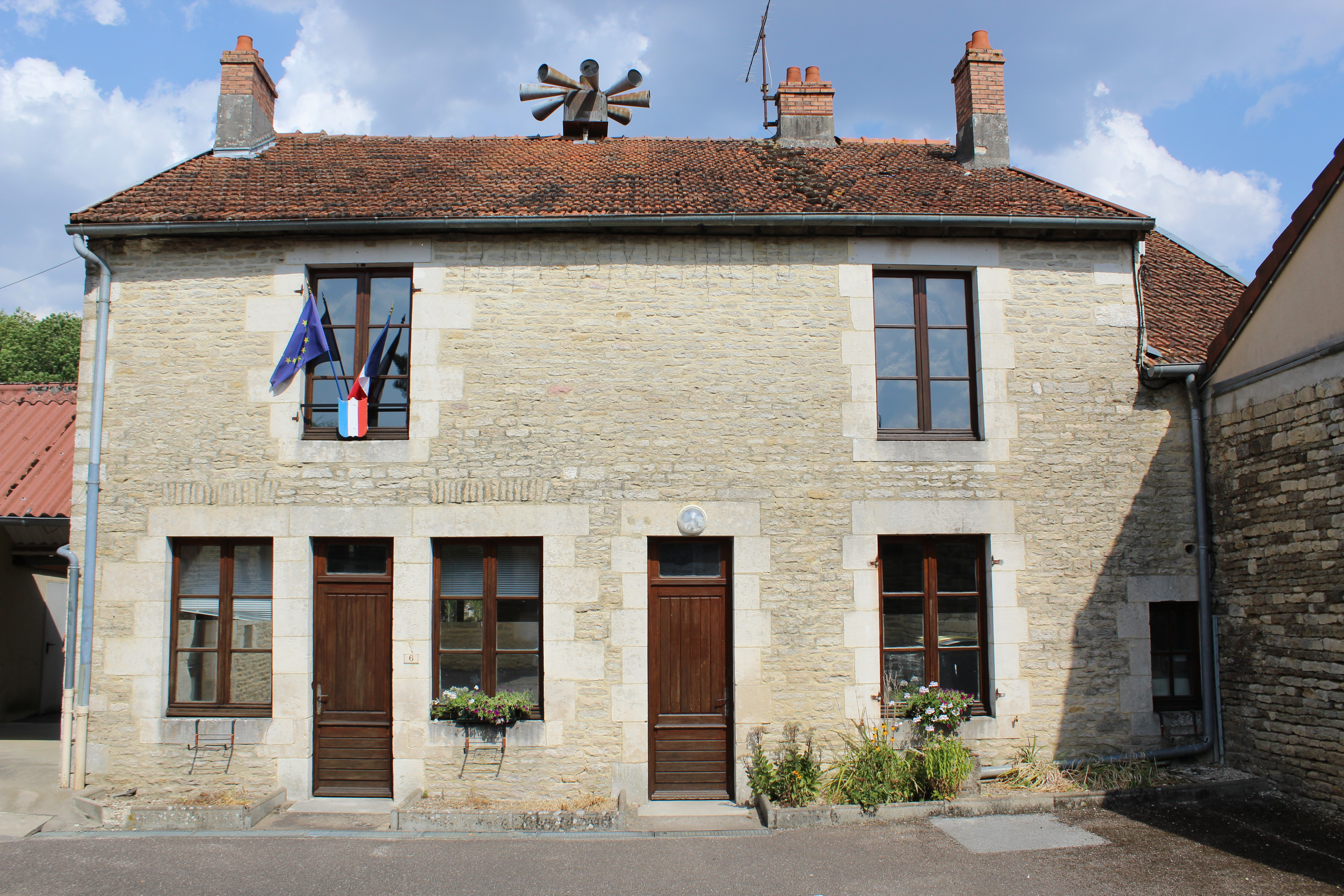
- The town hall in Buxières-lès-Villiers
- Location of Buxières-lès-Villiers
- Location within France Location within Grand Est
- Coordinates: 48°06′23″N 5°02′13″E
- Country: France
- Region: Grand Est
- Department: Haute-Marne
- Arrondissement: Chaumont
- Canton: Chaumont-2
- Intercommunality: CA Chaumont

Government
  - Mayor (2020–2026): Patrick Tilland
- Area^{1}: 4.97 km^{2} (1.92 sq mi)
- Elevation: 286 m (938 ft)
- Population (2023): 228
  - Density: 45.9/km^{2} (119/sq mi)
- Time zone: UTC+01:00 (CET)
  - Summer (DST): UTC+02:00 (CEST)
- INSEE/Postal code: 52087 /52000
- ^{1} French Land Register data, which excludes lakes, ponds, glaciers > 1 km^{2} (0.386 sq mi or 247 acres) and river estuaries.

Buxières-lès-Villiers (French pronunciation: [byksjɛʁ lɛ vilje], literally Buxières near Villiers) is a commune in the Haute-Marne department in northeastern France.

== Population ==
Historical population
Year	Pop.	±% p.a.
1968	100	—
1975	108	+1.11%
1982	127	+2.34%
1990	162	+3.09%
1999	196	+2.14%
2007	228	+1.91%
2012	207	−1.91%
2017	195	−1.19%
2023	228	+2.64%
Source: INSEE

== See also ==
- Communes of the Haute-Marne department
