= Condes, Haute-Marne =

Condes
- Commune
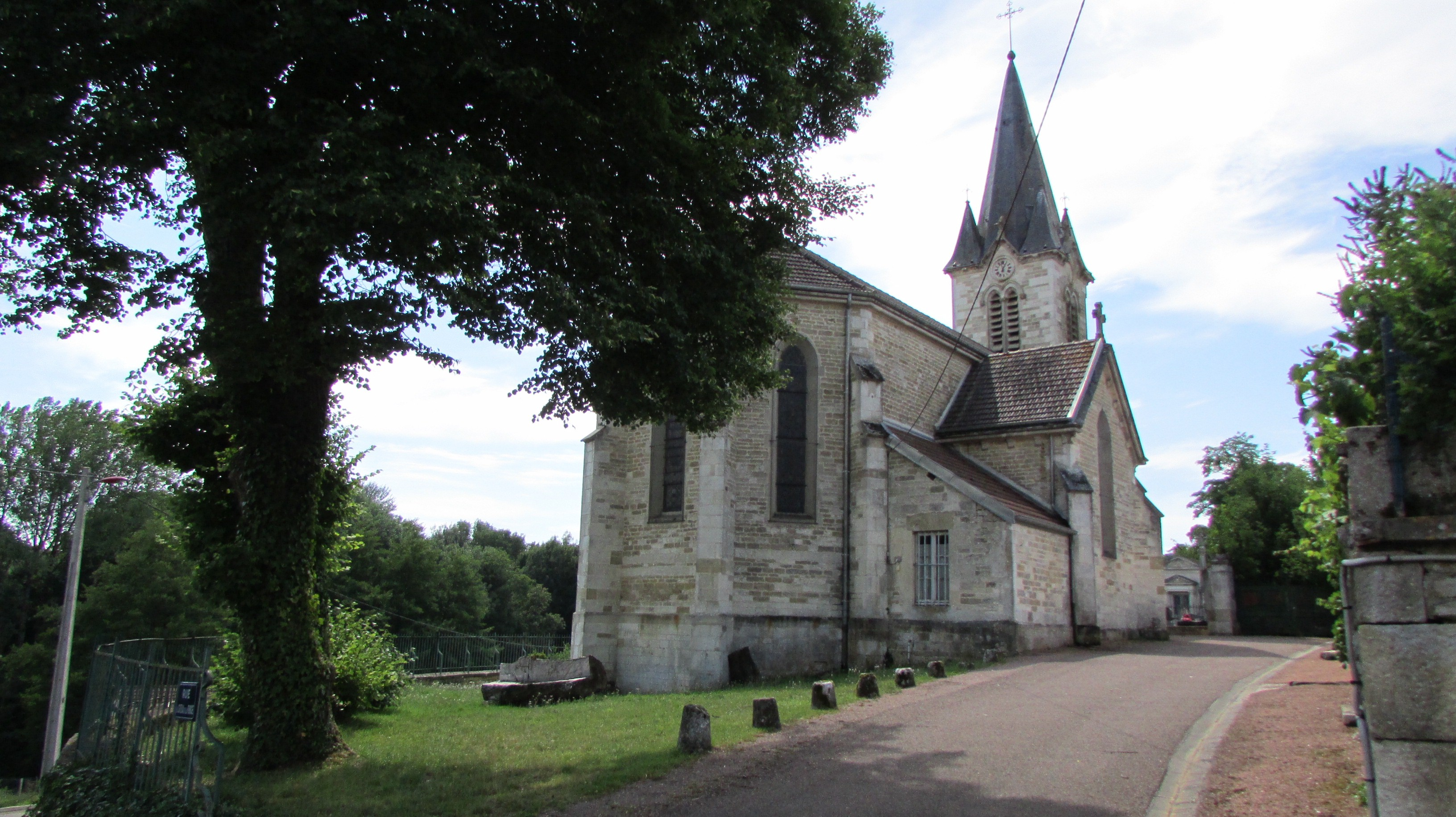
- The church in Condes
- Location of Condes
- Location within France Location within Grand Est
- Coordinates: 48°08′40″N 5°08′46″E
- Country: France
- Region: Grand Est
- Department: Haute-Marne
- Arrondissement: Chaumont
- Canton: Chaumont-1
- Intercommunality: CA Chaumont

Government
  - Mayor (2020–2026): Joël Clément
- Area^{1}: 5.08 km^{2} (1.96 sq mi)
- Elevation: 254 m (833 ft)
- Population (2023): 292
  - Density: 57.5/km^{2} (149/sq mi)
- Demonym(s): Condois, Condoises
- Time zone: UTC+01:00 (CET)
  - Summer (DST): UTC+02:00 (CEST)
- INSEE/Postal code: 52141 /52000
- ^{1} French Land Register data, which excludes lakes, ponds, glaciers > 1 km^{2} (0.386 sq mi or 247 acres) and river estuaries.

Condes (French pronunciation: [kɔ̃d]) is a commune in the Haute-Marne department in north-eastern France.

== Geography ==
Condes is located 3.3 km north of Chaumont, prefecture of Haute-Marne, and 20 km from Colombey-les-Deux-Églises. The commune is crossed by the Marne and the Bonneveau, the canal between Champagne and Burgundy and the RN 67 and D 200 roads.

== See also ==
- Communes of the Haute-Marne department
