= Laville-aux-Bois =

- Commune
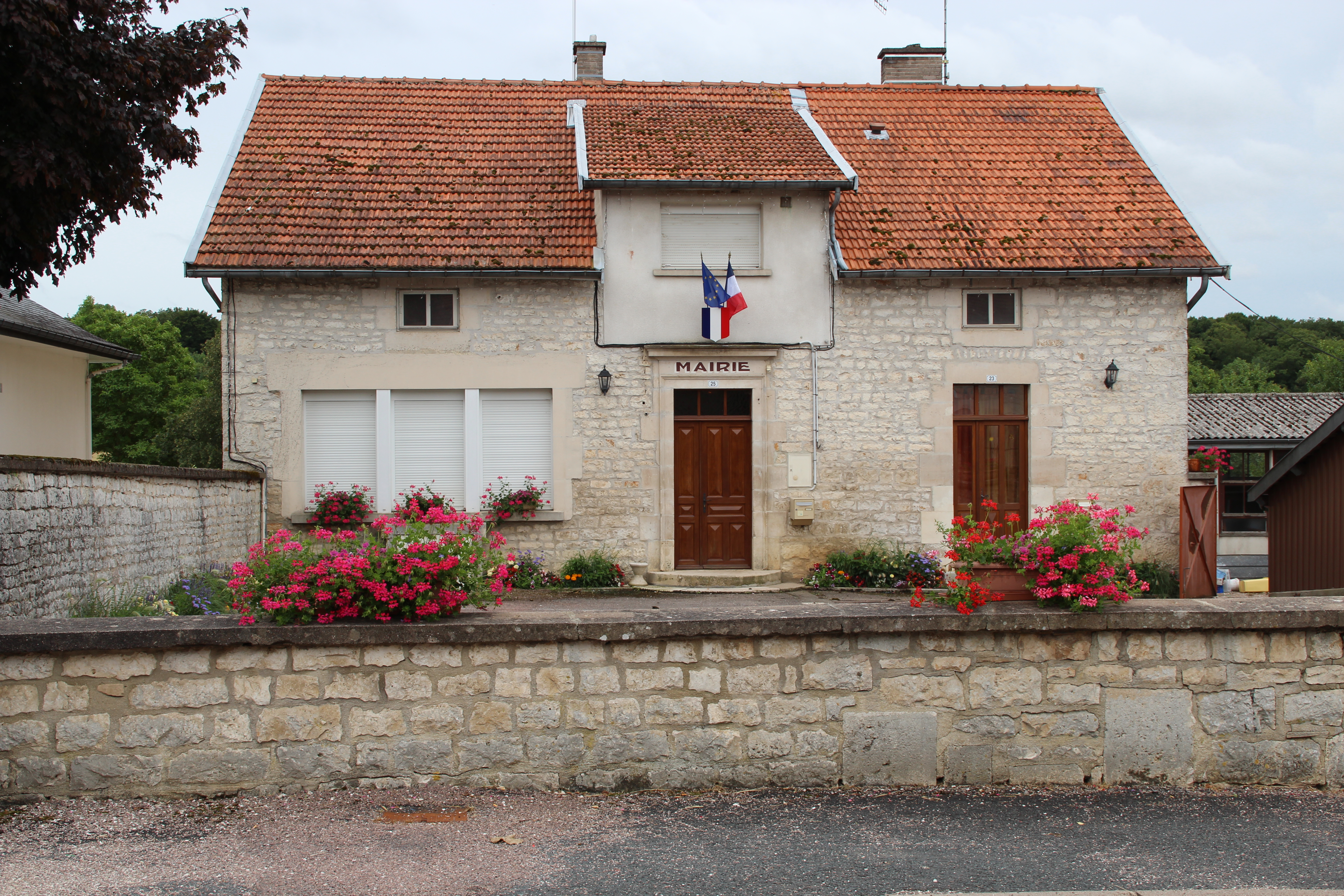
- Town hall
- Location of Laville-aux-Bois
- Location within France Location within Grand Est
- Coordinates: 48°05′45″N 5°13′40″E
- Country: France
- Region: Grand Est
- Department: Haute-Marne
- Arrondissement: Chaumont
- Canton: Chaumont-2
- Intercommunality: CA Chaumont

Government
  - Mayor (2020–2026): Claude Georges
- Area^{1}: 13.44 km^{2} (5.19 sq mi)
- Elevation: 375 m (1,230 ft)
- Population (2023): 238
  - Density: 17.7/km^{2} (45.9/sq mi)
- Demonym(s): Quechots, Quechottes
- Time zone: UTC+01:00 (CET)
  - Summer (DST): UTC+02:00 (CEST)
- INSEE/Postal code: 52276 /52000
- ^{1} French Land Register data, which excludes lakes, ponds, glaciers > 1 km^{2} (0.386 sq mi or 247 acres) and river estuaries.

Laville-aux-Bois (French pronunciation: [lavil o bwa]) is a commune in the Haute-Marne department in north-eastern France.

== See also ==
- Communes of the Haute-Marne department
