= Neuilly-sur-Suize =

- Commune
- Coat of arms
- Location of Neuilly-sur-Suize
- Location within France Location within Grand Est
- Coordinates: 48°03′05″N 5°08′59″E
- Country: France
- Region: Grand Est
- Department: Haute-Marne
- Arrondissement: Chaumont
- Canton: Chaumont-3
- Intercommunality: CA Chaumont

Government
  - Mayor (2024–2026): Jean-Paul Fevre
- Area^{1}: 14.67 km^{2} (5.66 sq mi)
- Elevation: 306 m (1,004 ft)
- Population (2023): 291
  - Density: 19.8/km^{2} (51.4/sq mi)
- Time zone: UTC+01:00 (CET)
  - Summer (DST): UTC+02:00 (CEST)
- INSEE/Postal code: 52349 /52000
- ^{1} French Land Register data, which excludes lakes, ponds, glaciers > 1 km^{2} (0.386 sq mi or 247 acres) and river estuaries.

Neuilly-sur-Suize (French pronunciation: [nøji syʁ sɥiz]) is a commune in the Haute-Marne department in north-eastern France.

== See also ==
- Communes of the Haute-Marne department
