= Canton of Chaumont-1 =

Coordinates: 48.11°N 5.14°E

The canton of Chaumont-1 is an administrative division of the Haute-Marne department, northeastern France. It was created at the French canton reorganisation which came into effect in March 2015. Its seat is in Chaumont.

It consists of the following communes:

1. Brethenay
2. Chaumont (partly)
3. Condes
4. Euffigneix
5. Jonchery
6. Riaucourt
7. Treix
