= Semoutiers-Montsaon =

- Commune
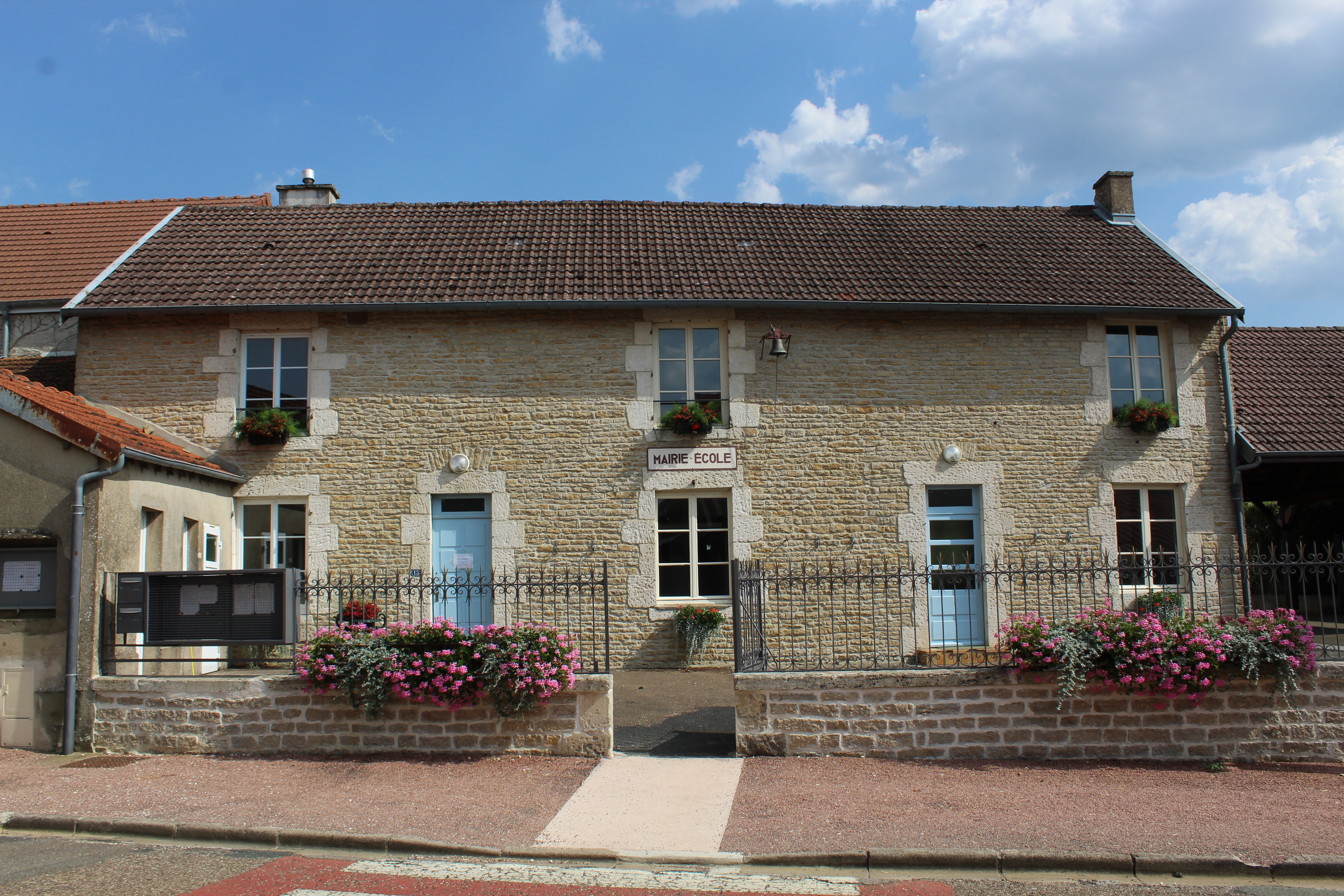
- The town hall in Montsaon
- Location of Semoutiers-Montsaon
- Location within France Location within Grand Est
- Coordinates: 48°03′34″N 5°03′28″E
- Country: France
- Region: Grand Est
- Department: Haute-Marne
- Arrondissement: Chaumont
- Canton: Chaumont-3
- Intercommunality: CA Chaumont

Government
  - Mayor (2020–2026): Jean-Luc Raillard
- Area^{1}: 27.4 km^{2} (10.6 sq mi)
- Elevation: 310 m (1,020 ft)
- Population (2023): 757
  - Density: 27.6/km^{2} (71.6/sq mi)
- Demonym(s): Semourstériens, Semourstériennes
- Time zone: UTC+01:00 (CET)
  - Summer (DST): UTC+02:00 (CEST)
- INSEE/Postal code: 52469 /52000
- ^{1} French Land Register data, which excludes lakes, ponds, glaciers > 1 km^{2} (0.386 sq mi or 247 acres) and river estuaries.

Semoutiers-Montsaon (French pronunciation: [səmutje mɔ̃sɑ̃]) is a commune in the Haute-Marne department in north-eastern France. It was created in 1972 by the merger of two former communes: Semoutiers and Montsaon.

== See also ==
- Communes of the Haute-Marne department
