= Brethenay =

- Commune
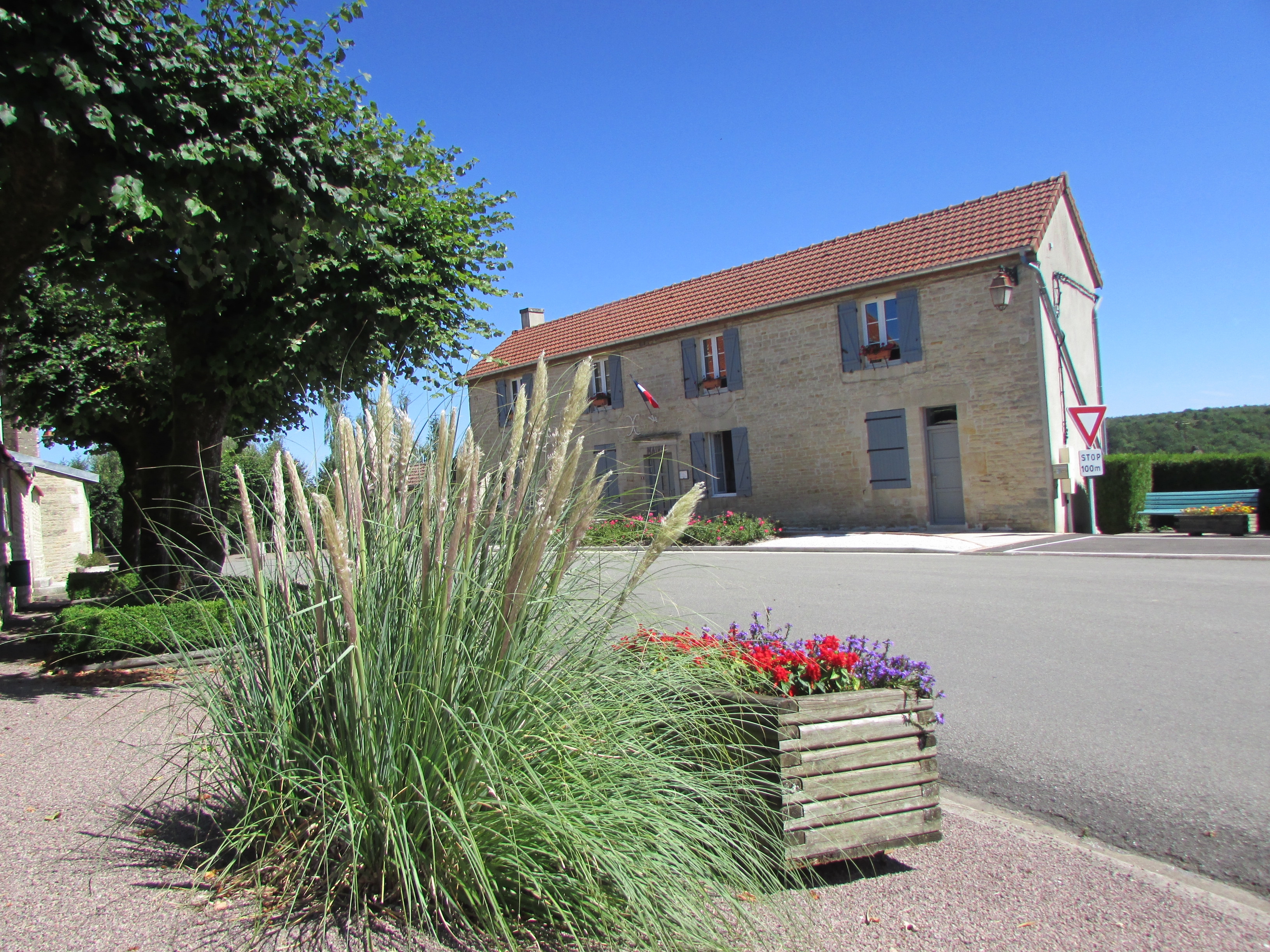
- The town hall in Brethenay
- Location of Brethenay
- Location within France Location within Grand Est
- Coordinates: 48°09′21″N 5°08′10″E
- Country: France
- Region: Grand Est
- Department: Haute-Marne
- Arrondissement: Chaumont
- Canton: Chaumont-1
- Intercommunality: CA Chaumont

Government
  - Mayor (2020–2026): Gilles Cassert
- Area^{1}: 8.84 km^{2} (3.41 sq mi)
- Elevation: 303 m (994 ft)
- Population (2023): 399
  - Density: 45.1/km^{2} (117/sq mi)
- Time zone: UTC+01:00 (CET)
  - Summer (DST): UTC+02:00 (CEST)
- INSEE/Postal code: 52072 /52000
- ^{1} French Land Register data, which excludes lakes, ponds, glaciers > 1 km^{2} (0.386 sq mi or 247 acres) and river estuaries.

Brethenay is a commune in the Haute-Marne department in northeastern France.

== Population ==
Historical population
Year	Pop.	±% p.a.
1968	159	—
1975	164	+0.44%
1982	344	+11.16%
1990	378	+1.19%
1999	372	−0.18%
2007	388	+0.53%
2012	366	−1.16%
2017	368	+0.11%
2023	399	+1.36%
Source: INSEE

== See also ==
- Communes of the Haute-Marne department
