= Luzy-sur-Marne =

- Commune
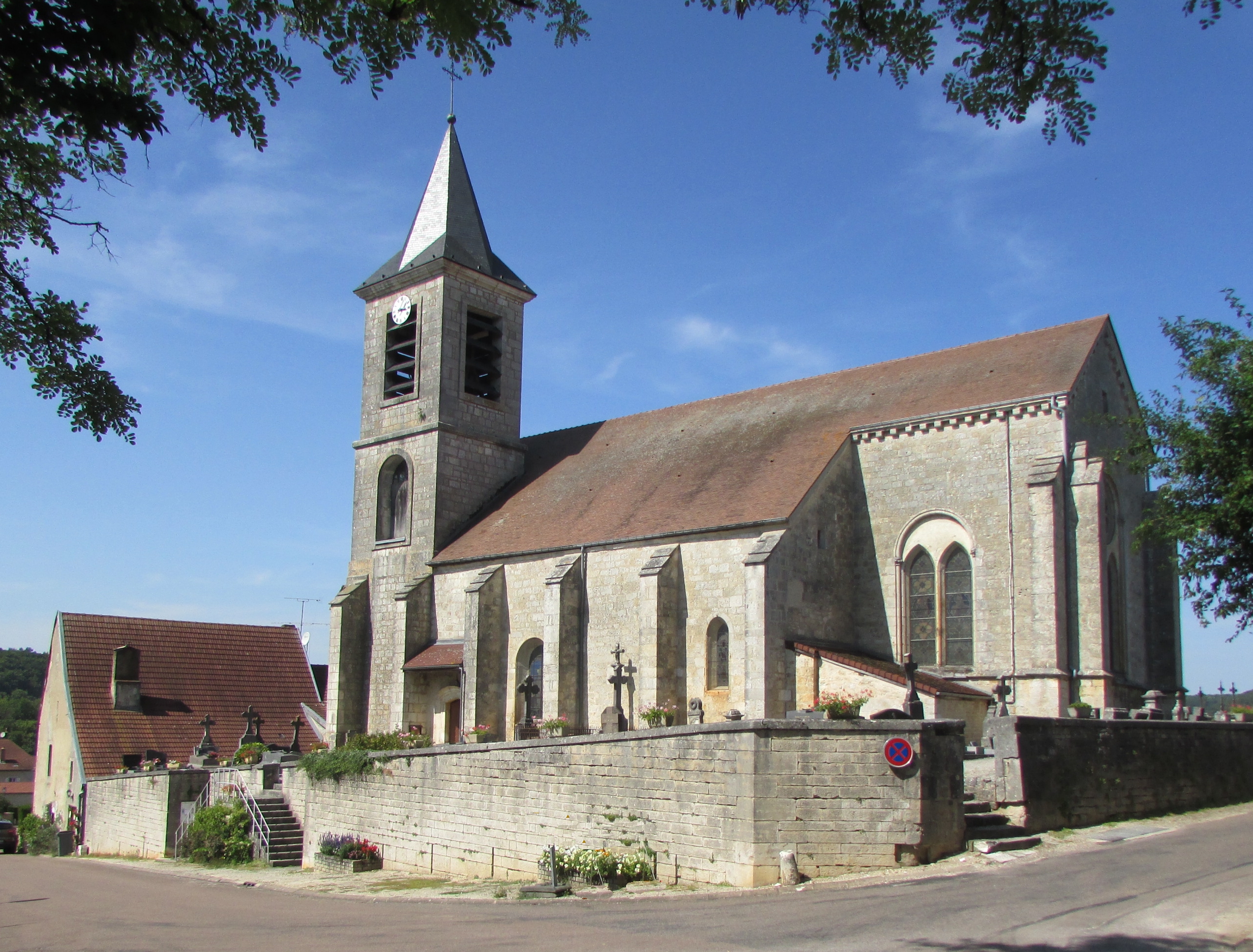
- The church in Luzy-sur-Marne
- Location of Luzy-sur-Marne
- Location within France Location within Grand Est
- Coordinates: 48°03′28″N 5°11′10″E
- Country: France
- Region: Grand Est
- Department: Haute-Marne
- Arrondissement: Chaumont
- Canton: Chaumont-3
- Intercommunality: CA Chaumont

Government
  - Mayor (2021–2026): Magali Gueny
- Area^{1}: 16.11 km^{2} (6.22 sq mi)
- Elevation: 275 m (902 ft)
- Population (2023): 279
  - Density: 17.3/km^{2} (44.9/sq mi)
- Time zone: UTC+01:00 (CET)
  - Summer (DST): UTC+02:00 (CEST)
- INSEE/Postal code: 52297 /52000
- ^{1} French Land Register data, which excludes lakes, ponds, glaciers > 1 km^{2} (0.386 sq mi or 247 acres) and river estuaries.

Luzy-sur-Marne (French pronunciation: [lyzi syʁ maʁn], literally Luzy on Marne) is a commune in the Haute-Marne department in north-eastern France.

== See also ==
- Communes of the Haute-Marne department
