= Riaucourt =

Commune in Haute-Marne, France

- Commune
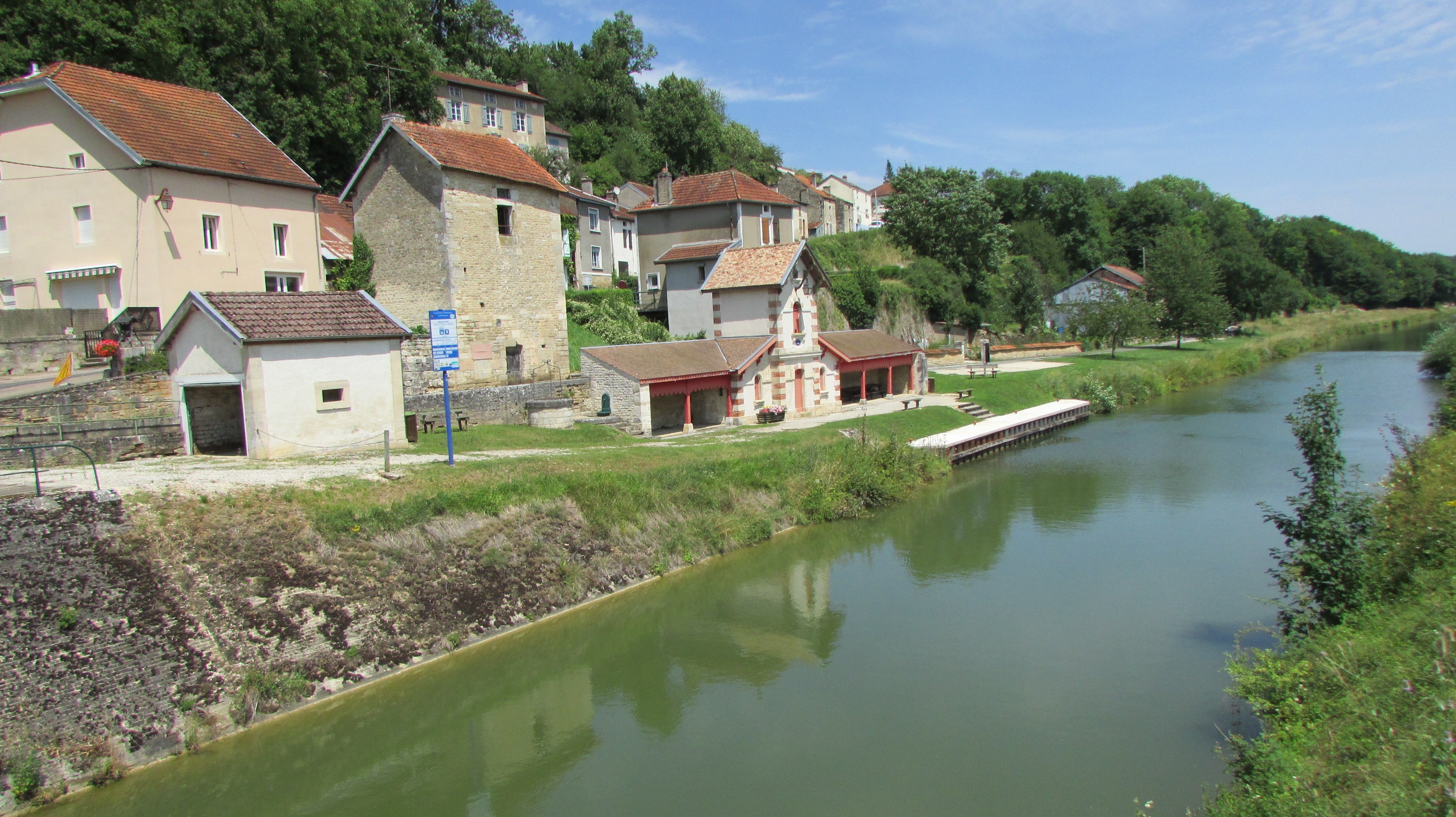
- The canal and surroundings in Riaucourt

- Coat of arms
- Location of Riaucourt
- Location within France Location within Grand Est
- Coordinates: 48°10′38″N 5°09′09″E
- Country: France
- Region: Grand Est
- Department: Haute-Marne
- Arrondissement: Chaumont
- Canton: Chaumont-1
- Intercommunality: CA Chaumont

Government
  - Mayor (2020–2026): Christophe Guyot
- Area^{1}: 10.71 km^{2} (4.14 sq mi)
- Elevation: 250 m (820 ft)
- Population (2023): 402
  - Density: 37.5/km^{2} (97.2/sq mi)
- Demonym(s): Riaucourtois, Riaucourtoises
- Time zone: UTC+01:00 (CET)
  - Summer (DST): UTC+02:00 (CEST)
- INSEE/Postal code: 52421 /52000
- ^{1} French Land Register data, which excludes lakes, ponds, glaciers > 1 km^{2} (0.386 sq mi or 247 acres) and river estuaries.

Riaucourt (French pronunciation: [ʁjokuʁ]) is a commune in the Haute-Marne department in north-eastern France. It is most notable for a castle that dates back to 1294.

== See also ==
- Communes of the Haute-Marne department
