= Treix =

- Commune
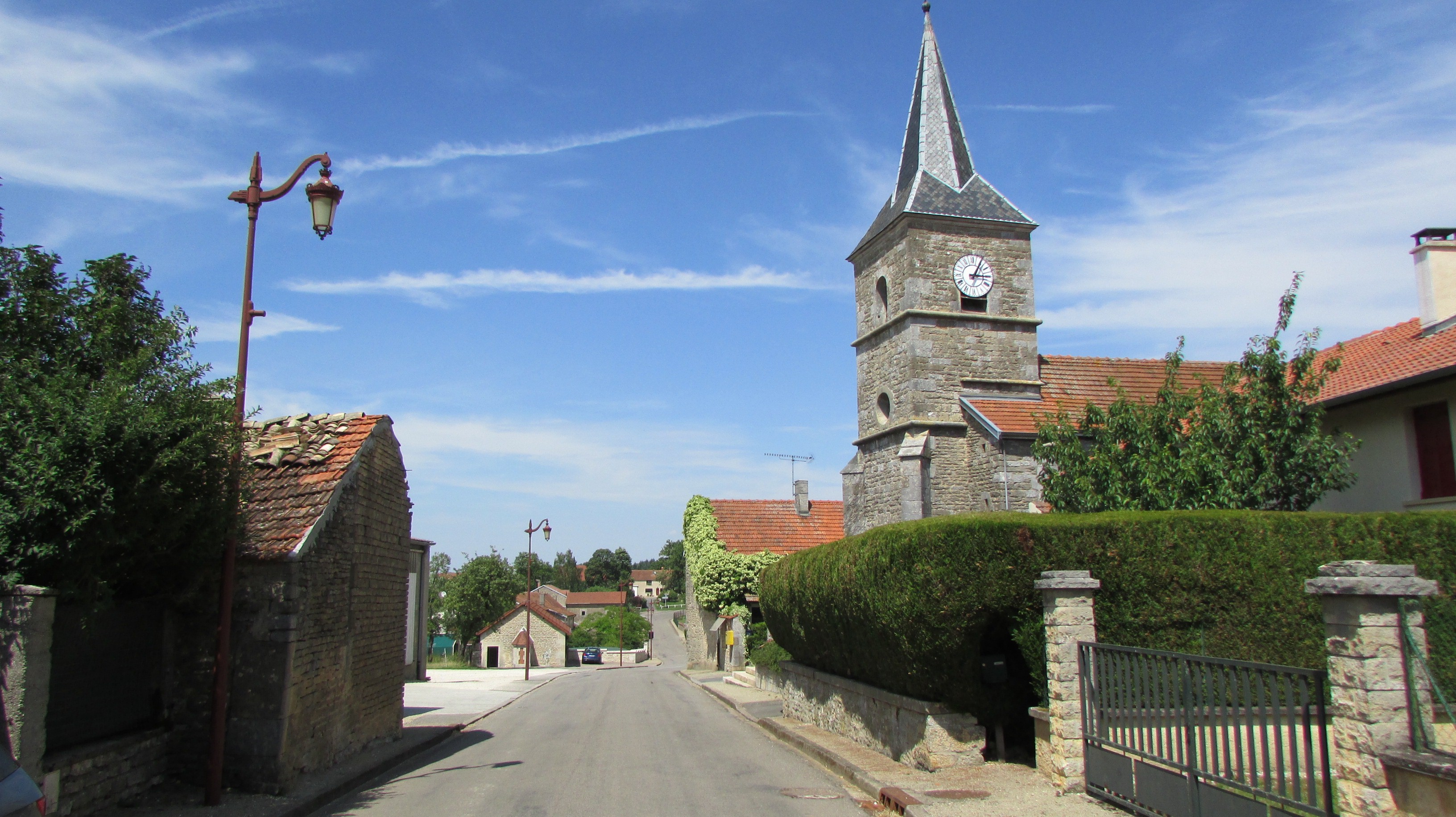
- The church in Treix
- Location of Treix
- Location within France Location within Grand Est
- Coordinates: 48°08′50″N 5°11′16″E
- Country: France
- Region: Grand Est
- Department: Haute-Marne
- Arrondissement: Chaumont
- Canton: Chaumont-1
- Intercommunality: CA Chaumont

Government
  - Mayor (2020–2026): Philippe Bertrand
- Area^{1}: 15.46 km^{2} (5.97 sq mi)
- Elevation: 337 m (1,106 ft)
- Population (2023): 213
  - Density: 13.8/km^{2} (35.7/sq mi)
- Demonym(s): Tréyens, Tréyennes
- Time zone: UTC+01:00 (CET)
  - Summer (DST): UTC+02:00 (CEST)
- INSEE/Postal code: 52494 /52000
- ^{1} French Land Register data, which excludes lakes, ponds, glaciers > 1 km^{2} (0.386 sq mi or 247 acres) and river estuaries.

Treix is a commune in the Haute-Marne department in north-eastern France.

== See also ==
- Communes of the Haute-Marne department
