= Canton of Chaumont-3 =

Administrative Division

Coordinates: 48.09°N 5.14°E

The canton of Chaumont-3 is an administrative division of the Haute-Marne department, northeastern France. It was created at the French canton reorganisation which came into effect in March 2015. Its seat is in Chaumont.

It consists of the following communes:

1. Chaumont (partly)
2. Foulain
3. Luzy-sur-Marne
4. Neuilly-sur-Suize
5. Semoutiers-Montsaon
6. Verbiesles
