= Jonchery =

- Commune
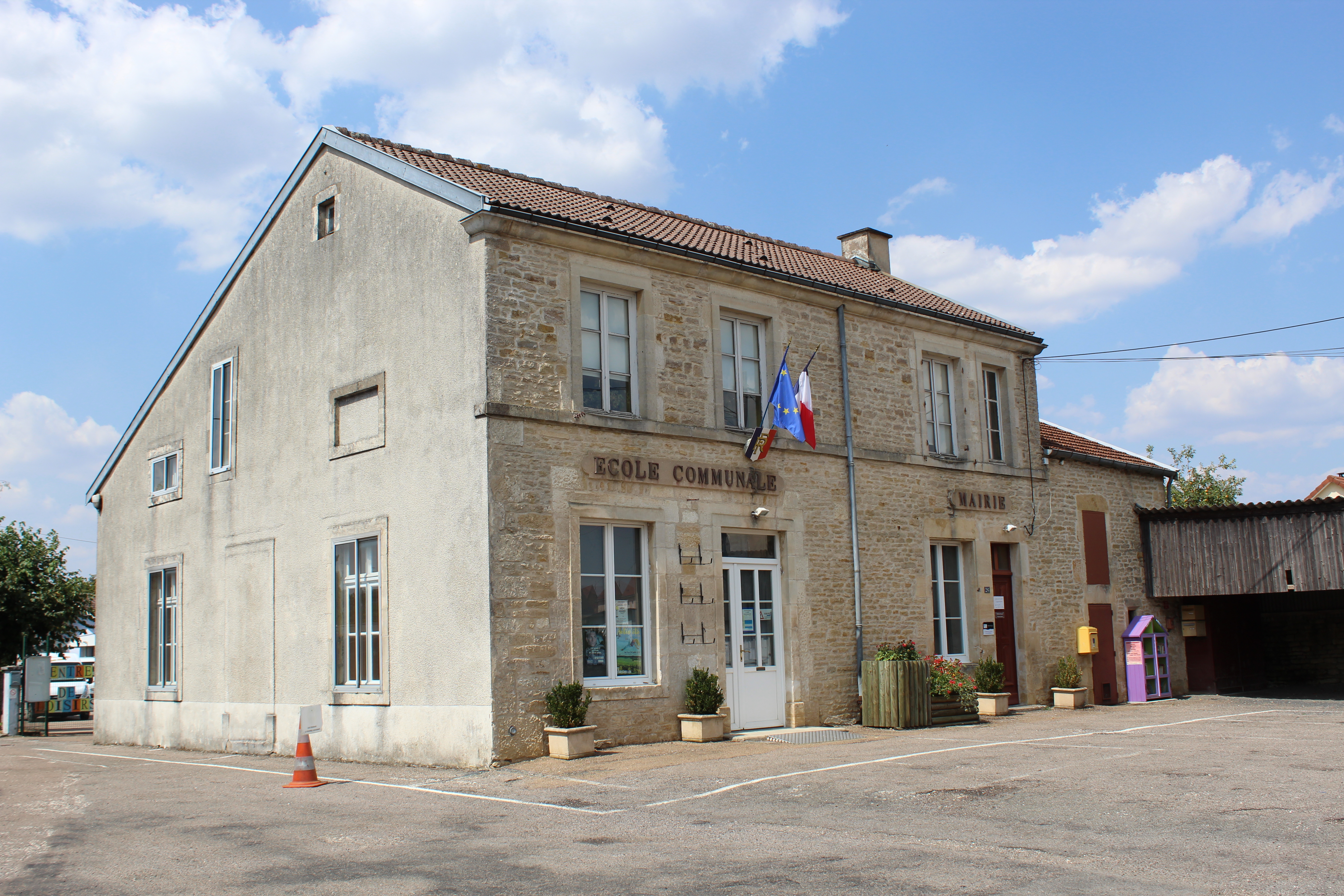
- The town hall in Jonchery
- Location of Jonchery
- Location within France Location within Grand Est
- Coordinates: 48°08′12″N 5°05′14″E
- Country: France
- Region: Grand Est
- Department: Haute-Marne
- Arrondissement: Chaumont
- Canton: Chaumont-1
- Intercommunality: CA Chaumont

Government
  - Mayor (2020–2026): Sylvie Roux
- Area^{1}: 28.98 km^{2} (11.19 sq mi)
- Elevation: 286 m (938 ft)
- Population (2023): 947
  - Density: 32.7/km^{2} (84.6/sq mi)
- Demonym(s): Joncherois, Joncheroises
- Time zone: UTC+01:00 (CET)
  - Summer (DST): UTC+02:00 (CEST)
- INSEE/Postal code: 52251 /52000
- ^{1} French Land Register data, which excludes lakes, ponds, glaciers > 1 km^{2} (0.386 sq mi or 247 acres) and river estuaries.

Jonchery (French pronunciation: [ʒɔ̃ʃʁi]) is a commune in the Haute-Marne department in north-eastern France.

== See also ==
- Communes of the Haute-Marne department
