= Chamarandes-Choignes =

- Commune
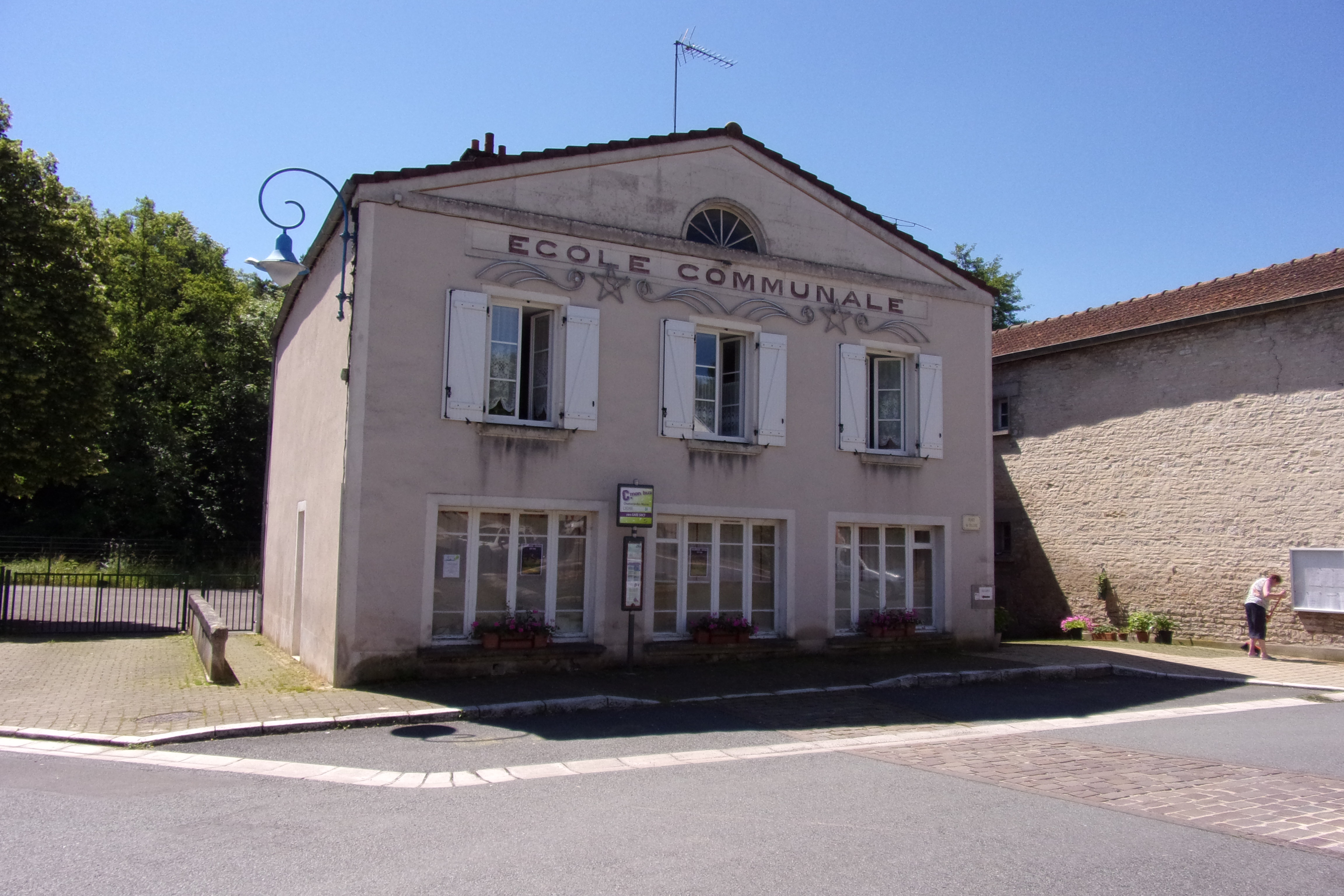
- The town hall in Chamarandes

- Coat of arms
- Location of Chamarandes-Choignes
- Location within France Location within Grand Est
- Coordinates: 48°06′30″N 5°10′18″E
- Country: France
- Region: Grand Est
- Department: Haute-Marne
- Arrondissement: Chaumont
- Canton: Chaumont-2
- Intercommunality: CA Chaumont

Government
  - Mayor (2020–2026): Bernadette Retournard
- Area^{1}: 18.8 km^{2} (7.3 sq mi)
- Elevation: 260 m (850 ft)
- Population (2023): 1,039
  - Density: 55.3/km^{2} (143/sq mi)
- Time zone: UTC+01:00 (CET)
  - Summer (DST): UTC+02:00 (CEST)
- INSEE/Postal code: 52125 /52000
- ^{1} French Land Register data, which excludes lakes, ponds, glaciers > 1 km^{2} (0.386 sq mi or 247 acres) and river estuaries.

Chamarandes-Choignes (French pronunciation: [ʃamaʁɑ̃d ʃwaɲ]) is a commune in the Haute-Marne department in north-eastern France.

== See also ==
- Communes of the Haute-Marne department
