= Canton of Chaumont-2 =

Coordinates: 48.10°N 5.14°E

The canton of Chaumont-2 is an administrative division of the Haute-Marne department, northeastern France. It was created at the French canton reorganisation which came into effect in March 2015. Its seat is in Chaumont.

It consists of the following communes:

1. Buxières-lès-Villiers
2. Chamarandes-Choignes
3. Chaumont (partly)
4. Laville-aux-Bois
5. Villiers-le-Sec
