= Mary de Vitry =

Executed French person

- Born: Chaumont-en-Bassigny
- Died: c. September 1580; Montier-en-Der
- Cause of death: Hanging
- Occupation: Weaver

Mary de Vitry (died 1580) was a person assigned female at birth and possibly hanged after refusing to live "as a girl," mentioned by Michel de Montaigne and Ambroise Paré.

== Narrative ==
=== Ambrose Paré ===
According to Ambroise Paré (Monsters and Wonders first published in 1573 as volume 2 of Deux livres de chirurgie) who claims to have met, or at least seen, Germain Garnier while visiting Vitry le François in the king's entourage: Until he was fifteen years old he was called Marie and lived as a girl, show no signs of virility, and wearing women's clothing. Chasing his pigs who had got into wheat he jumped a ditch, at which point he tore the ligaments which had retained his male organs inside his body, releasing them. Returning weeping to his mother's house he complained that his innards had fallen out of his stomach. Medics were consulted and concluded that Marie was a man, and the bishop, Cardinal de Lenoncourt gave him a man's name "Germain". He was known as Germain Garnier, but by some as Germain Marie.

When Paré met him he was a young man of average height, well built with a thick red beard. Paré writes in the (first) 1573 edition that both Germain and his mother were believed to still be living, a claim that is still present in later editions.

Both Robert de Lenoncourt and his nephew Philippe de Lenoncourt were cardinals, and both were Bishop of Chalons. However Philippe was not cardinal until 16 November 1586 (and lived until 1592), so it is unlikely that Pare would have referred to him as le déffunt Cardinal de Lenoncourt in 1573. Robert was translated in 1550, but retained use of the Bishop's House.

While Paré was surgeon to four kings of France: Henry II, Francis II, Charles IX and Henry III, he is known to have travelled with Charles IX on his progress from 1564 to 1566 which visited Vitaly la Françoise on 27–29 April 1564.

=== Montaigne ===
According to Montaigne's original Travel Journal:

Originally from the Chaumont-en-Bassigny area, with six or seven girls from the surrounding area, he decided to live under a male gender identity and the first name Mary.

Settling in Vitry-le-François, he worked there as a weaver. He became engaged for the first time, but the relationship was short-lived. He then moved to Montier-en-Der and subsequently married another woman, with whom he lived maritally for five months. Recognized and denounced, he was tried and sentenced to death, which "she said she would rather suffer than return to the state of a girl."
