= Order of Val des Écoliers =

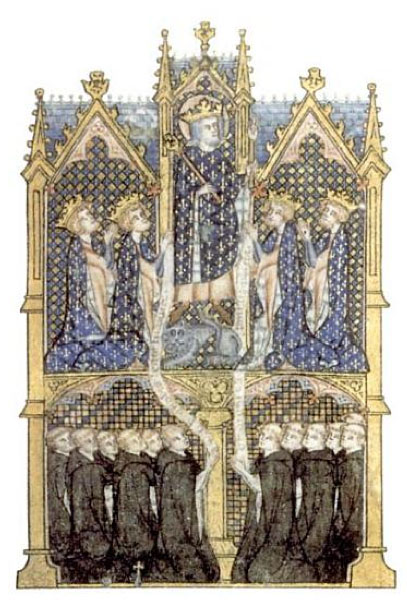
King Philip the Fair and his three sons (the future kings Louis X, Philip V and Charles IV) alongside the monks of Val des Écoliers invoke Saint Louis in an illustration from the cartulary of Royallieux

The Order of Val des Écoliers (Latin: Ordo Vallis Scholarium, 'Order of the Valley of Scholars'), sometimes called the Écoliers du Christ ('Scholars of Christ'), was an order of canons regular following the Rule of Saint Augustine.

According to tradition, the mother house of the order was founded in 1201 by William, Richard, Evrard and Manasses, four scholars from the University of Paris. They adopted the Augustinian rule and the Victorine usage and were approved by Pope Honorius III in 1219. The name 'Valley of Scholars' was in use by 1215 and William was the first prior of the order. The title prior was initially preferred to abbot out of humility. The prior of the mother house (and of the order as a whole) was elected by its canons in the presence of the priors of the first three daughter houses, Bonvaux, Belroy and Épineuseval. The chapter general of the order, consisting of all the priors, met once annually in the mother house.

At its height, the order had 28 daughter houses spread across northern France and the east of the Holy Roman Empire from the Duchy of Burgundy in the south to the Duchy of Brabant in the north, from the Duchy of Bar in the east to the Duchy of Normandy in the west. Ten of these houses were direct dependents of the mother house at Val des Écoliers, the rest being subdependents. Seven of the 28 houses lay in the Empire, but only two were outside of French-speaking areas: Zoutleeuw and Hanswijk.

The most prominent house after the mother house was Sainte-Catherine de Paris. Founded in 1229, it had a college at the university by 1254. Between 1259 and 1334, the order had thirteen regent masters who taught at the university: Evrard of Voulaines, Gregory of Burgundy, Giles of Montmirail, Laurence of Poulangy, John of Châtillon, John of Bray, Laurence of Dreux, John du Val, Gerard of Troyes, John of Sedeloos, James of Royallieu, Peter of Verberie and a certain Walter.

The College of the Valley Scholars at Salisbury, founded in 1262 by Bishop Giles of Bridport, was probably connected to Val des Écoliers.

The order was attached to the Congregation of France in 1636. It was suppressed during the French Revolution.

== Monasteries ==
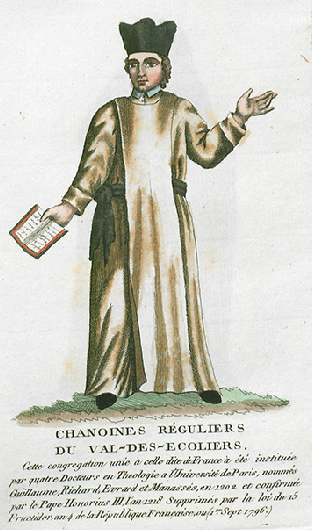
The costume of a canon regular of Val des Écoliers

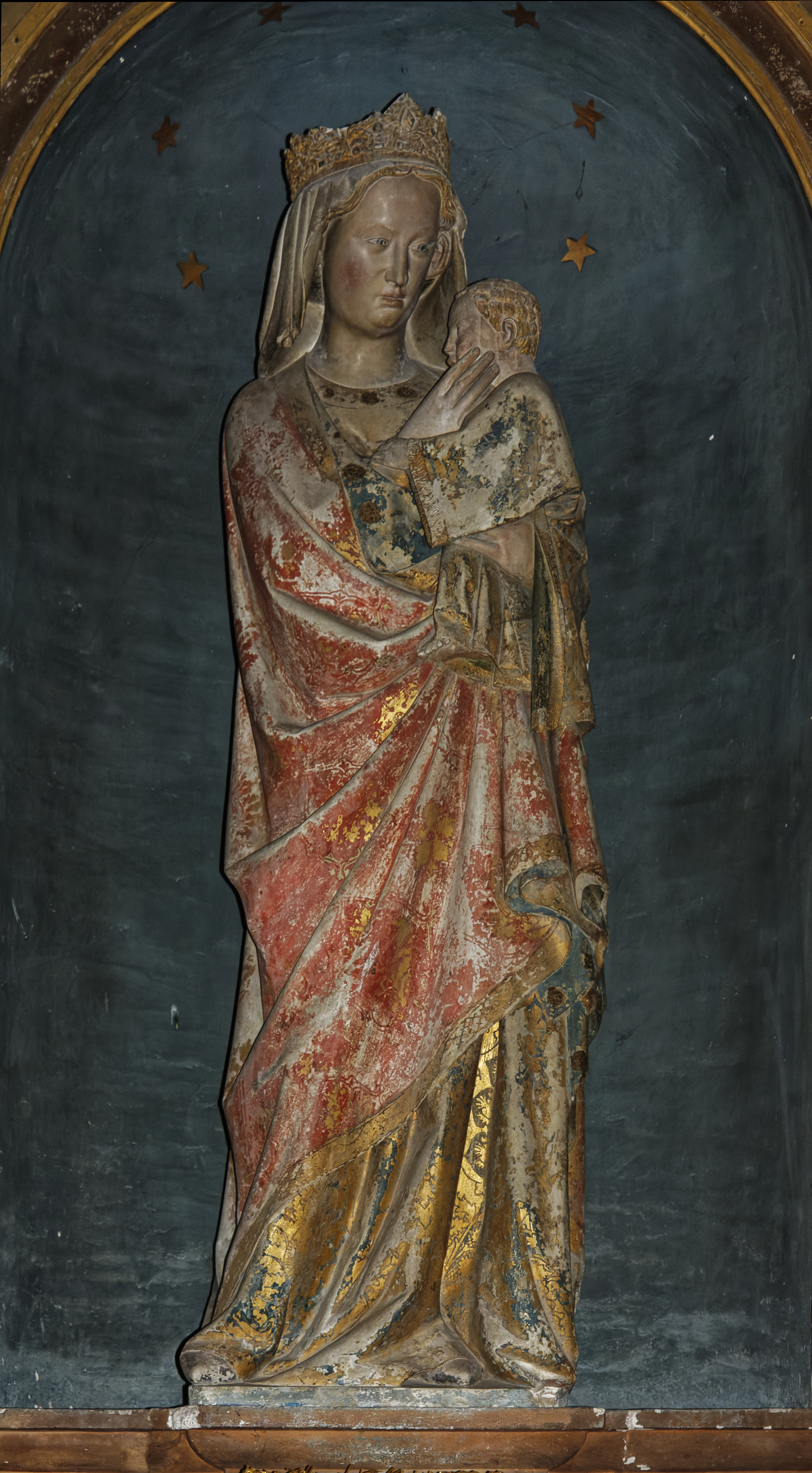
Statue of the Madonna from Notre-Dame de Belroy

The following chart shows the organization of the order, with founding dates of each house.

1. Val des Écoliers, Verbiesles
  1. Notre-Dame de Bonvaux (1215)
    1. Notre-Dame de Pontailler (1246)
  2. Notre-Dame de Belroy (1215)
    1. Notre-Dame de Troyes (1222)
      1. Sainte-Catherine de Paris (1229)
        1. Saint-Éloi de Longjumeau (1235)
        2. Notre-Dame de Mons (1252)
        3. Notre-Dame d'Harcourt (1254)
        4. Sainte-Geneviève de Marcy (1255)
        5. Saint-Georges de la Grange (1271)
        6. Saint-Louis de Royallieu (1303)
        7. Notre-Dame d'Hennemont (1304)
      2. Saint-Nicolas de Laon (1235)
      3. Notre-Dame de Choisel (before 1252)
  3. Notre-Dame d'Épineuseval (1215)
  4. Notre-dame de Wassy (1216)
  5. Saint-Jacques de Pont-sur-Seine (1217)
  6. Notre-Dame de Landèves (1219)
  7. Notre-Dame de Beauchamp (1219)
    1. Dieu-en-Souvienne de Louppy (1220), founded by Geoffroy II de Louppy
  8. Saint-Paul de Reims (1220)
  9. Notre-Dame de Géronsart (1221)
    1. Notre-Dame de Liège (1231)
      1. Sainte-Catherine d'Houffalize (1235)
      2. Saint Sulpicius of Zoutleeuw (1236)
        1. Our Lady of Hanswijk (1288)
  10. Saint-Nicolas de Bar-sur-Aube (1441)

== Bibliography ==
- Guyon, Catherine (1998). Les écoliers du Christ: l'ordre canonial du Val des Ecoliers, 1201–1539. CERCOR.
- Pansters, Krijn (2020). "Medieval Rules and Customaries Reconsidered". In Krijn Pansters (ed.). A Companion to Medieval Rules and Customaries. Brill. pp. 1–36.
- Sullivan, Thomas (2007). "The Quodlibeta of the Canons Regular and the Monks". In Schabel, Christopher (ed.). Theological Quodlibeta in the Middle Ages: The Fourteenth Century. Brill. pp. 359–400.
