= Villiers-le-Sec, Haute-Marne =

Villiers-le-Sec
- Commune
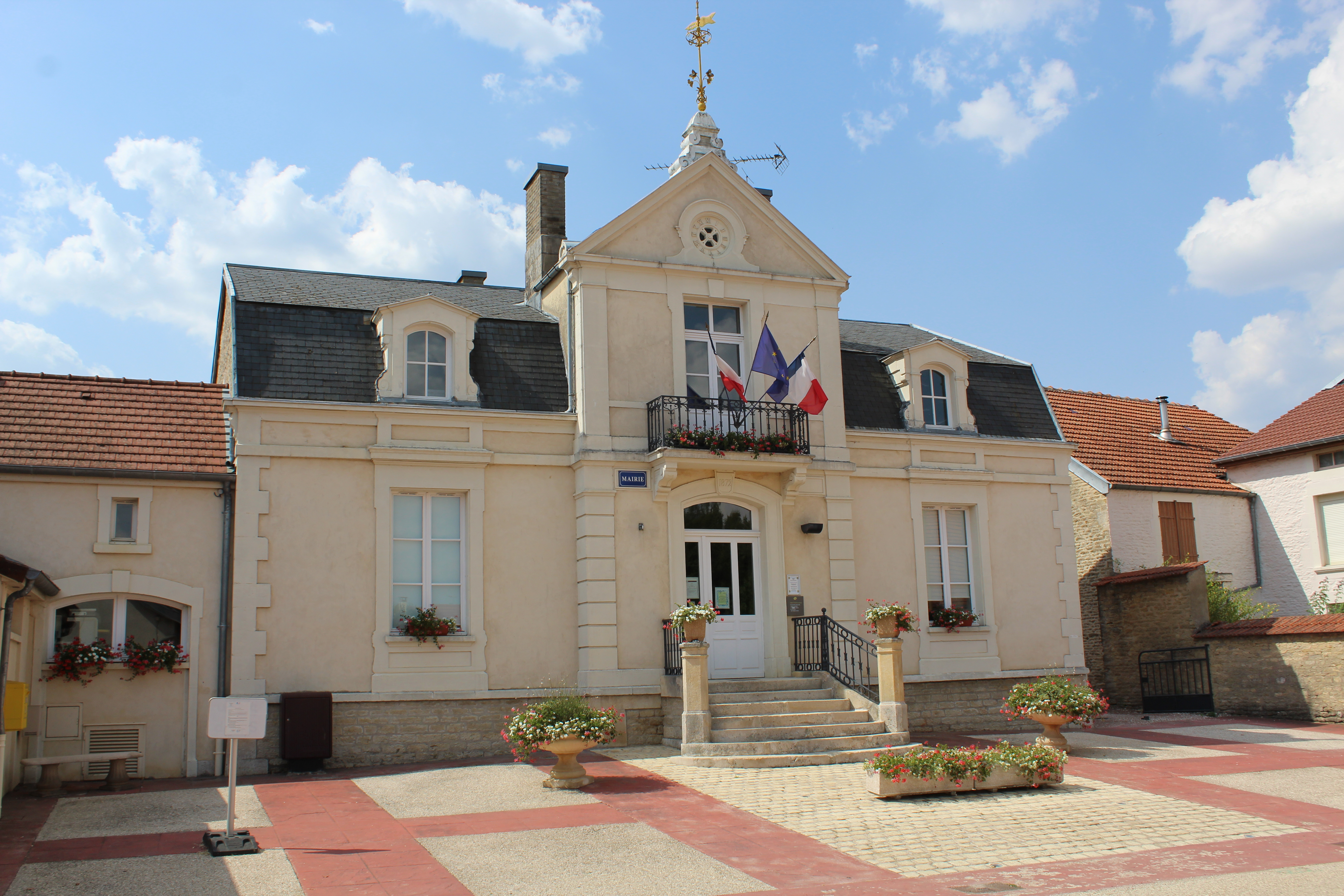
- The town hall in Villiers-le-Sec
- Location of Villiers-le-Sec
- Location within France Location within Grand Est
- Coordinates: 48°06′23″N 5°03′50″E
- Country: France
- Region: Grand Est
- Department: Haute-Marne
- Arrondissement: Chaumont
- Canton: Chaumont-2
- Intercommunality: CA Chaumont

Government
  - Mayor (2020–2026): Laurence Meunier
- Area^{1}: 15.71 km^{2} (6.07 sq mi)
- Elevation: 290 m (950 ft)
- Population (2023): 710
  - Density: 45/km^{2} (120/sq mi)
- Demonym(s): Villiers-le-Secois, Villiers-le-Secoises
- Time zone: UTC+01:00 (CET)
  - Summer (DST): UTC+02:00 (CEST)
- INSEE/Postal code: 52535 /52000
- ^{1} French Land Register data, which excludes lakes, ponds, glaciers > 1 km^{2} (0.386 sq mi or 247 acres) and river estuaries.

Villiers-le-Sec (French pronunciation: [vilje lə sɛk]) is a commune in the Haute-Marne department in north-eastern France.

== See also ==
- Communes of the Haute-Marne department
