= College of the Valley Scholars =

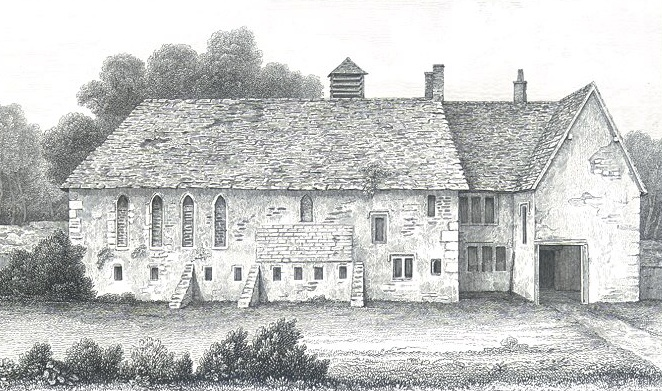
The college building as sketched in 1826

The College of the Valley Scholars of St Nicholas (Latin: Collegium de Valle Scholarium beati Nicholai), sometimes called the Valley College and De Vaux College, was a seat of learning in Salisbury, England.

It has some claim to be seen as the first university college in England, as it was founded three years before Merton College, Oxford, which claims to be the oldest college at Oxford.

== Background and foundation ==
In 1238, a quarrel at Osney Abbey between Oxford students and the papal legate, Otto Candidus, led to Oxford being put under an interdict and the university being suspended. As a result, both masters and students migrated away from Oxford, to Salisbury and Northampton, and the king took action against the offenders, who included a student named John of Bridport.

In 1261, there were severe disputes in the University of Cambridge, then barely fifty years old, between Northern and Southern men, which caused a large number of scholars to migrate to Northampton. At the same time, there were ongoing town and gown battles at Oxford, with the same effect. A University of Northampton was formally established in 1261, but it was suppressed in 1265.

The college was founded in 1262 by Giles of Bridport, Bishop of Salisbury. He planned to build it in a meadow by the new Salisbury Cathedral, which was still being built, and the king's highway, in front of St Nicholas Hospital. It was to maintain forever one warden, two chaplains, and twenty poor, needy, and honourable scholars, living in the college, serving God and Saint Nicholas, and studying theology and the liberal arts.

== Name ==
The Latin name of his college, collegium de Valle Scholarium, may have been suggested to Bishop Giles as it was also used by a continental order of Augustinian canons regular, which in 1229 had begun to build a college for students in Paris. The name used by Giles in full was the College of the Valley Scholars of the Blessed Nicholas. In any event, he must have found it a suitable name for a college of scholars at Salisbury in the Avon Valley.

In his history of St Nicholas's Hospital (1890), G. H. Moberly calls the college simply "the Valley College". A history of Winchester College in 1893 calls it "the House of the Valley Scholars of Saint Nicholas of Salisbury". Arthur Francis Leach in 1896 refers to "the College of the Scholars de Vawze, i. e. the Valley Scholars, at Salisbury". The more fanciful name "De Vaux College" first appears in an article in the Wiltshire Archaeological and Natural History Magazine in 1934 and was also used by the Wiltshire Victoria County History in 1956.

== Development ==
Jurisdiction over university scholars at Salisbury was regulated in 1278. By 1279, most of the elements of a studium generale, a medieval university, existed at Salisbury. The city continued as a centre of teaching in theology and the liberal arts until well into the 14th century, with most of the scholars transferring to Salisbury Hall, Oxford, in 1325. After that, according to Leach, "the College at Salisbury seems to have become practically a nursery for a few scholars attending the Cathedral Grammar School at Salisbury, and remained so until the Reformation."

== End ==
The college was a victim of Henry VIII, being dissolved on 2 August 1542, later than the monasteries (1536–1541), but before the Dissolution of Colleges Act 1545, aimed at the chantries. Most of its property was sold in 1543. Its house, with one and a half acres of gardens and orchards, its manors of West and East Harnham and Britford, its holdings in Lavington and Roundway, and the rectories and advowsons of vicarages of Milborne and Dewlish, were sold for £437 10s. 10d. (equivalent to £317,756 in 2023) to Sir Michael Lister, a king's servant. Its manor of 'Herbar' or 'le Erbyr' was sold to Sir John Williams, Master of the Jewels, and Anthony Stringer; its manor of Wasing to Sir Humphrey Forster, a king's servant. In 1545, fifteen messuages (dwellings) and gardens in Salisbury were sold to John Pollard, a king's servant, and William Byrte, a yeoman. The rectory of Allington was later granted by Queen Mary to Cardinal Pole and the clergy.

== Survival of buildings ==
The college's main building in Salisbury was still standing in 1826, when it was sketched by Robert Benson, Deputy Recorder of Salisbury, and his work was engraved for Peter Hall's Picturesque Memorials of Salisbury (1834), in which Hall claims that by 1834 it had been demolished and a row of houses built on the land. These are now called De Vaux Place. Despite this, number 8, St Nicholas Road, has medieval fabric which appears to survive from the college. It is a Grade II* listed building, and the listing calls it a "refronting of much earlier building" and adds "With No 9 De Vaux Place and No 6 St Nicholas's Road the building was originally part of the College de Valle, founded by Bishop Bridport in 1261 as a theological college which continued there until the Dissolution." The row of windows shown in the engraving of 1834 is gone, but there are medieval and 17th-century window features, and the roof has smoke-blackened rafters believed to date from the 13th century. A study for the Royal Commission on the Historical Monuments of England says "Hall's assertion that 'the whole edifice is now demolished' is inaccurate."

Also in St Nicholas Road, there is a house now called "De Vaux House". It has two storeys and an attic above, and its walls largely date from about 1700 and are of ashlar, brick, and flint; but built into the house are some late mediaeval walls which are believed to survive from a building connected with the college. A plan of about 1825 names this building as Magdalen Penitentiary. A massive flint rubble wall, now at the rear of a garden, may also be contemporary with the college.
