= Verbiesles =

- Commune
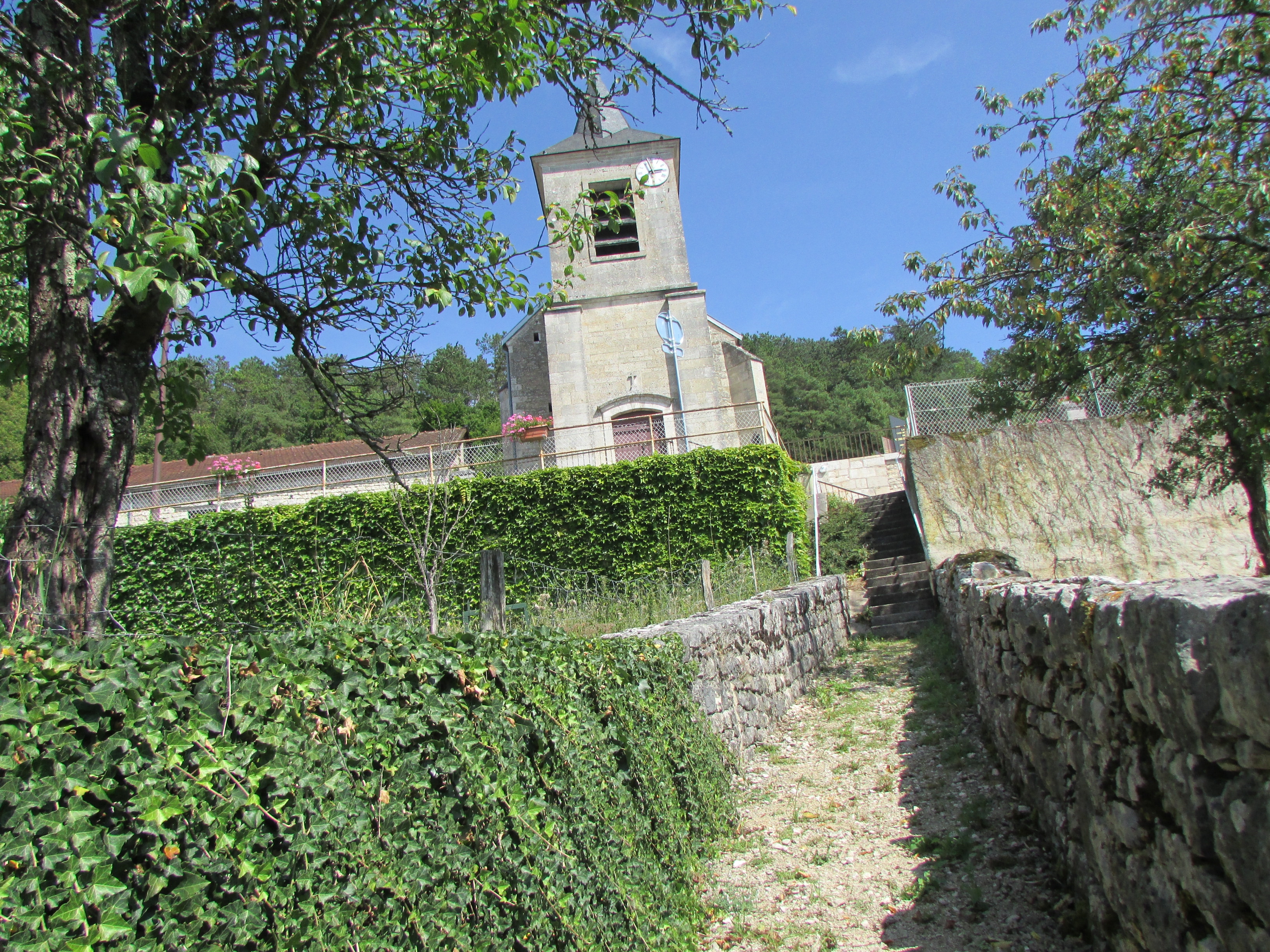
- The church in Verbiesles
- Location of Verbiesles
- Location within France Location within Grand Est
- Coordinates: 48°04′13″N 5°11′10″E
- Country: France
- Region: Grand Est
- Department: Haute-Marne
- Arrondissement: Chaumont
- Canton: Chaumont-3
- Intercommunality: CA Chaumont

Government
  - Mayor (2020–2026): Marie-Noëlle Hubert
- Area^{1}: 11.36 km^{2} (4.39 sq mi)
- Elevation: 280 m (920 ft)
- Population (2023): 306
  - Density: 26.9/km^{2} (69.8/sq mi)
- Time zone: UTC+01:00 (CET)
  - Summer (DST): UTC+02:00 (CEST)
- INSEE/Postal code: 52514 /52000
- ^{1} French Land Register data, which excludes lakes, ponds, glaciers > 1 km^{2} (0.386 sq mi or 247 acres) and river estuaries.

Verbiesles (French pronunciation: [vɛʁbjɛl]) is a commune in the Haute-Marne department in north-eastern France.

== See also ==
- Communes of the Haute-Marne department
