= Pope Honorius III =

Head of the Catholic Church from 1216 to 1227

- Bishop of Rome
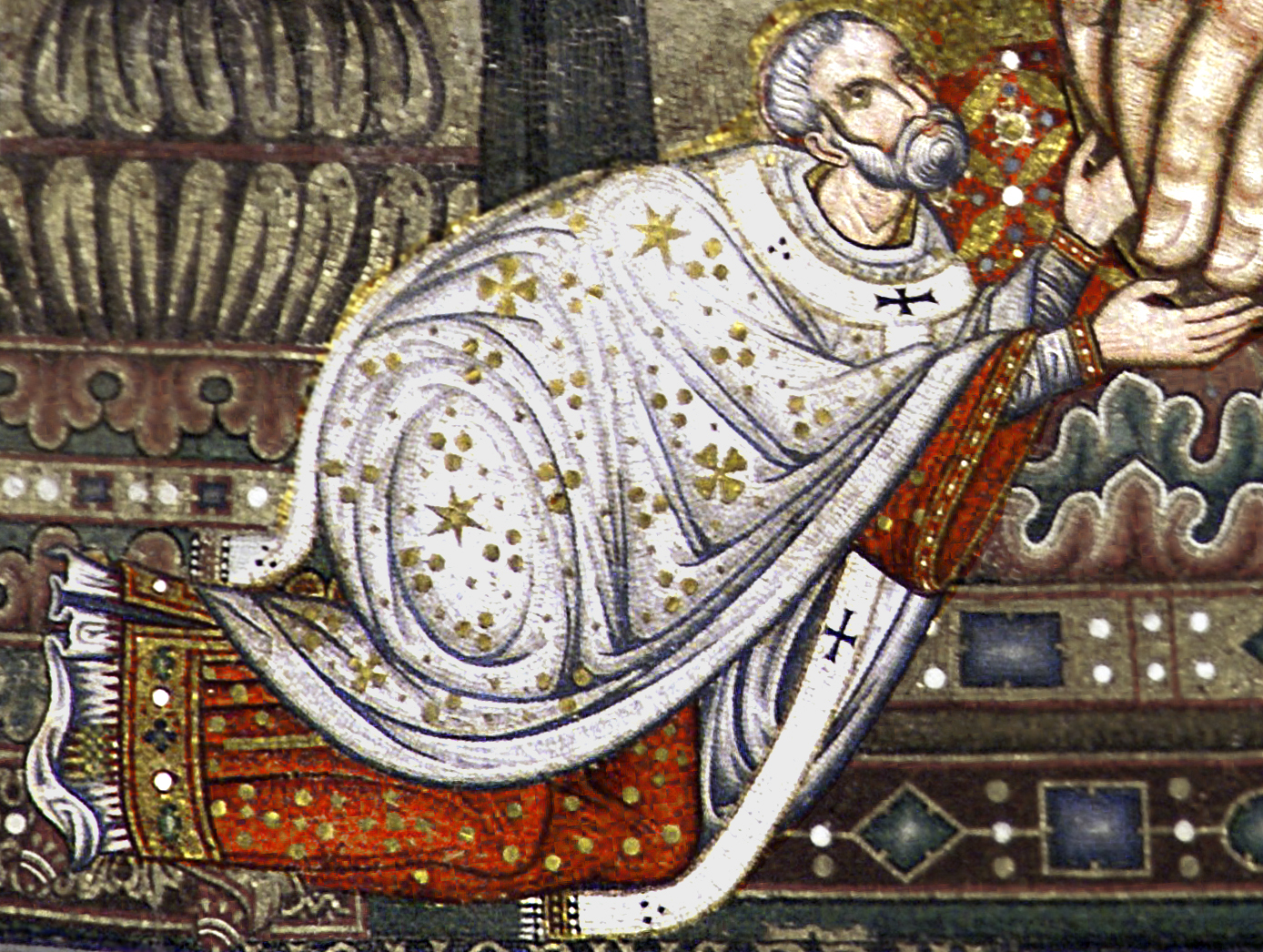
- Honorius III kneeling at the feet of Christ, apse mosaic of Saint Paul Outside the Walls
- Church: Catholic Church
- Papacy began: 18 July 1216
- Papacy ended: 18 March 1227
- Predecessor: Innocent III
- Successor: Gregory IX
- Previous posts: Cardinal-Deacon of Santa Lucia in Orphea (1193–1200); Cardinal-Priest of Santi Giovanni e Paolo (1200–1216); Camerlengo of the Sacred College of Cardinals (1198–1216); Vice-Chancellor of the Holy Roman Church (1194–1198); Camerlengo of the Holy Roman Church (1188–1198)

Orders
- Consecration: 24 July 1216 by Ugolino di Conti
- Created cardinal: 20 February 1193 by Pope Celestine III

Personal details
- Born: Cencio Savelli c. 1150 Rome, Papal States
- Died: 18 March 1227 (aged 76–77) Rome, Papal States
- Coat of arms

Pope Honorius III (c. 1150 – 18 March 1227), born Cencio Savelli, was head of the Catholic Church and ruler of the Papal States from 18 July 1216 to his death. A canon at the Basilica di Santa Maria Maggiore, he came to hold a number of important administrative positions, including that of Camerlengo. In 1197, he became tutor to the young Frederick II. As pope, he worked to promote the Fifth Crusade, which had been planned under his predecessor, Innocent III. Honorius repeatedly exhorted King Andrew II of Hungary and Emperor Frederick II to fulfill their vows to participate. He also gave approval to the recently formed Dominican and Franciscan religious orders.

== Early work ==
He was born in Rome as a son of Aimerico, a member of the Roman Savelli family.

For a time canon at the church of Santa Maria Maggiore, he later became Camerlengo of the Holy Roman Church on December 5, 1189 and Cardinal Deacon of Santa Lucia in Silice on 20 February 1193. Under Pope Clement III and Pope Celestine III, he was treasurer of the Roman Church, compiling the Liber Censuum, and served as acting Vice-Chancellor of the Holy Roman Church from 1194 until 1198.

In 1197, he became the tutor to the Sicilian king Frederick, future emperor, who had been given as ward to Pope Innocent III by his mother, Constance.

Innocent III raised him to the rank of a cardinal priest in 1200, by which he obtained the Titulus of Ss. Ioannis et Pauli. He was dismissed as Camerlengo of the Holy Roman Church in 1198, but about the same time, he assumed the post of Camerlengo of the Sacred College of Cardinals, post which he held until 1216.

== Papacy ==
=== Election ===
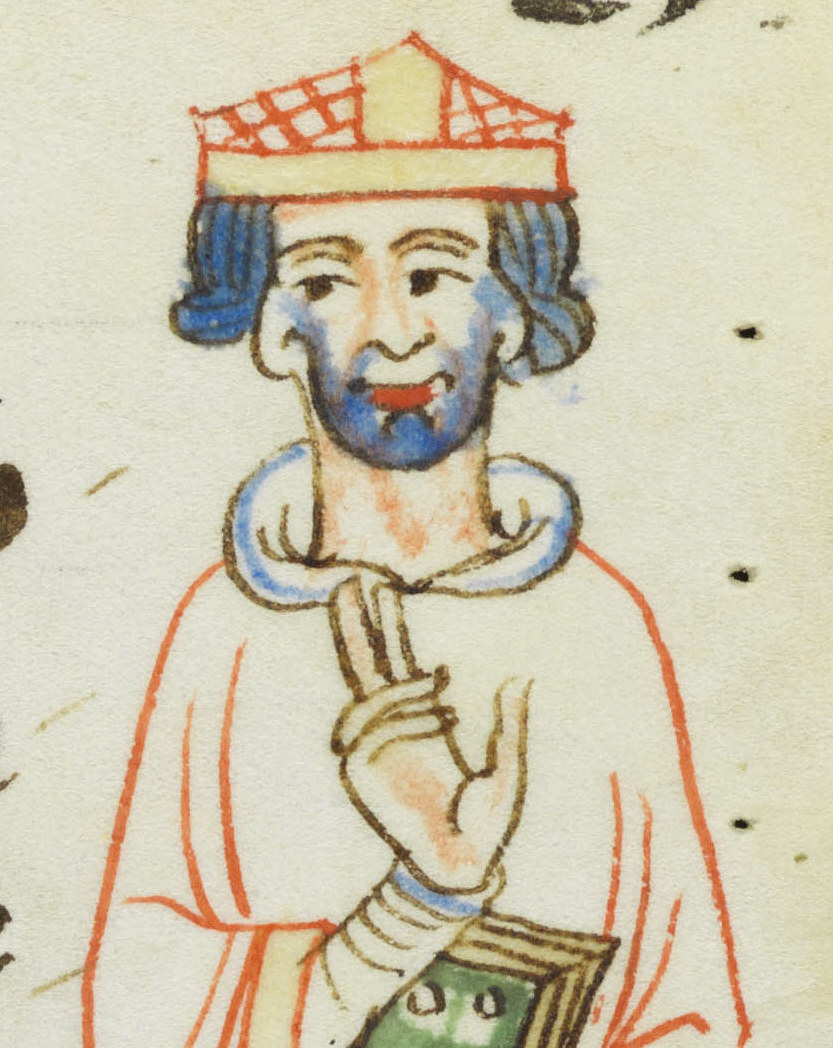
Honorius depicted in a 13th-century manuscript from Weissenau Abbey

Innocent III died on 16 July 1216. Two days later, seventeen cardinals present at his death assembled to elect a new pope. The troubled state of affairs in Italy, the threatening attitude of the Tatars, and the fear of a schism induced the cardinals to agree to an election by compromise. Cardinals Ugolino of Ostia (afterwards Pope Gregory IX) and Guido Papareschi were empowered to appoint the new pope. Their choice fell upon Cencio Savelli, who accepted the tiara with reluctance and took the name of Honorius III. He was consecrated at Perugia on 24 July 1216 and was crowned at Rome on 31 August 1216. He took possession of the Lateran on 3 September 1216. The Roman people were greatly elated at the election, for Honorius III was himself a Roman and by his extreme kindness had endeared himself to the hearts of all.

=== Fifth Crusade ===
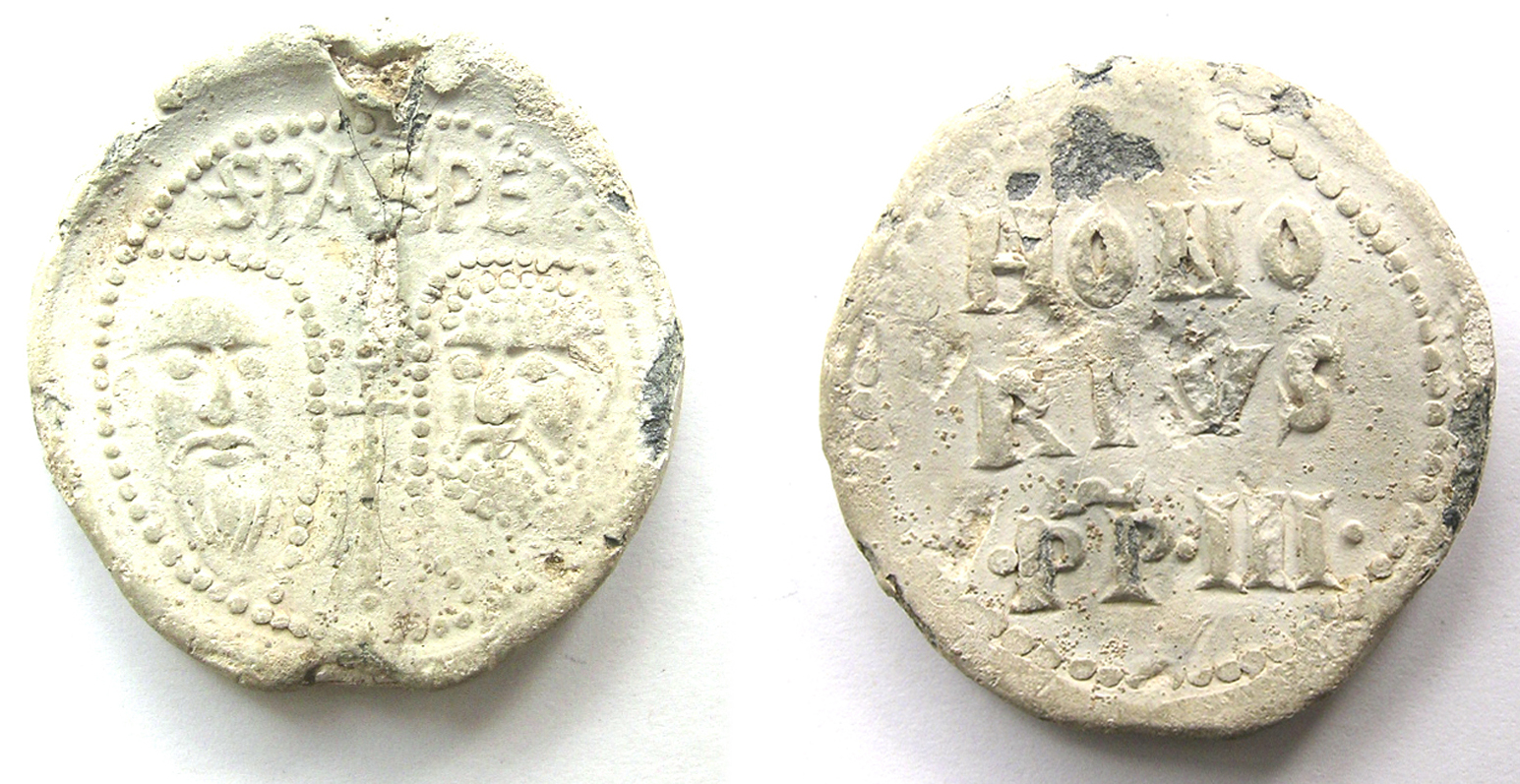
Papal bulla of Honorius III

The Fifth Crusade was endorsed by the Lateran Council of 1215, and Honorius started preparations for the crusade to begin in 1217. To procure the means necessary for this colossal undertaking, the Pope, and the cardinals were to contribute the tenth part of their income for three years. All other ecclesiastics were to contribute the twentieth part. Though the money thus collected was considerable, it was by no means sufficient for a general crusade as planned by Honorius III.

Far-reaching prospects seemed to open before him when Honorius crowned Peter II of Courtenay as Latin Emperor of Constantinople in April 1217, but the new Emperor was captured on his eastward journey by the despot of Epirus, Theodore Komnenos Doukas, and died in confinement.

In July 1216, Honorius once again called upon Andrew II of Hungary to fulfill his father's vow to lead a crusade. (Béla III willed property and money to Andrew, obliging him to lead a crusade to the Holy Land.) Like many other rulers, his former pupil, the Emperor Frederick II of Germany, had taken an oath to embark for the Holy Land in 1217. But Frederick II hung back, and Honorius III repeatedly put off the date for the beginning of the expedition. In spite of the insistence of Honorius III, Frederick II still delayed, and the Egyptian campaign failed miserably with the loss of Damietta on 8 September 1221.

Most rulers of Europe were engaged in wars of their own and could not leave their countries for any length of time. King Andrew II of Hungary and, somewhat later, a fleet of crusaders from the region along the Lower Rhine finally departed for the Holy Land. They took Damietta and a few other places in Egypt, but a lack of unity among the Christians and rivalry between their leaders and the papal legate Pelagius resulted in failure.

24 June 1225 was finally fixed as the date for the departure of Frederick II, and Honorius III brought about his marriage to Queen Isabella II of Jerusalem with a view to binding him closer to the plan. But the Treaty of San Germano in July 1225 permitted a further delay of two years.

Frederick II now made serious preparations for the crusade. In the midst of it, however, Pope Honorius III died in Rome on 18 March 1227 without seeing the achievement of his hopes. It was left to his successor, Pope Gregory IX, to insist upon their accomplishment.

Besides the liberation of the Holy Land, Honorius III felt bound to forward the repression of Cathar heresy in the south of France, the war for the faith in the Spanish peninsula, the planting of Christianity in the lands along the Baltic Sea, and the maintenance of the unsustainable Latin empire in Constantinople.

Of these projects, the rooting out of heresy lay nearest to Honorius III's heart. In the south of France, he carried on Innocent III's work, confirming Simon de Montfort, 5th Earl of Leicester in the possession of the lands of Raymond VI of Toulouse and succeeding, as Innocent III had not, in drawing the royal house of France into the conflict.

The most widely important event of this period was the siege and capture of Avignon in 1226. Both Honorius III and King Louis VIII of France turned a deaf ear to Frederick II's assertion of the claims of the Empire to that town.

=== Approval of religious orders and other works ===
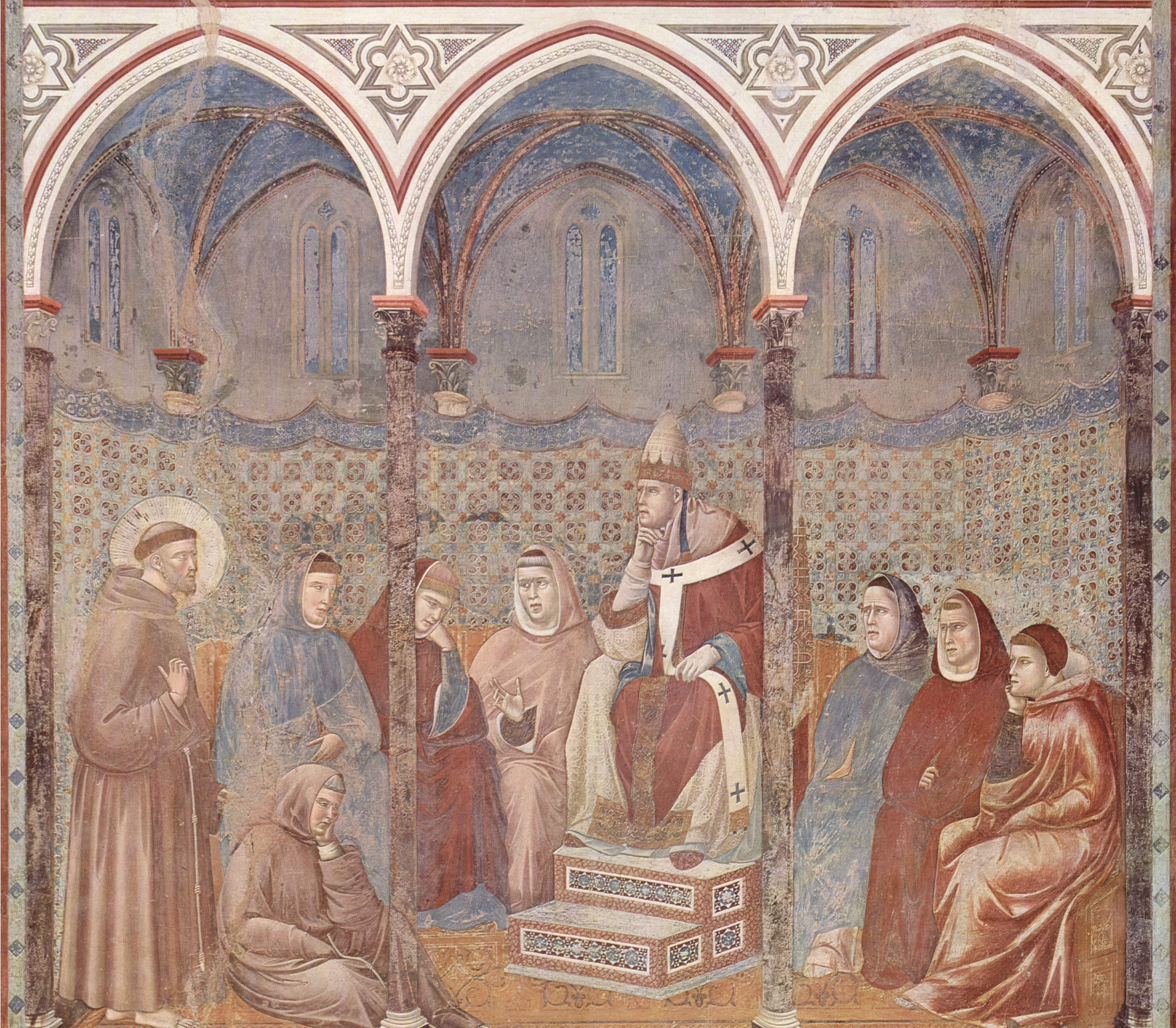
Saint Francis preaches in the presence of Honorius III: fresco by Giotto in the Basilica of Saint Francis of Assisi (c. 1296–98)

Pope Honorius III approved the Dominican Order in 1216, the Franciscan Order in 1223, and the Carmelite Order's Rule of St. Albert of Jerusalem in 1226.

In 1219, Honorius III invited Saint Dominic and his companions to take up residence at the ancient Roman basilica of Santa Sabina, which they did by early 1220. Before that time, the friars had only a temporary residence in Rome at the convent of San Sisto Vecchio, which Honorius had given to St. Dominic c. 1218, intending it to become a convent for a reformation of nuns in Rome under Dominic's guidance. The studium conventuale at Santa Sabina was the forerunner of the Dominican studium generale at Santa Maria sopra Minerva.

In 1217, Honorius III gave the title of King of Serbia to Stefan the First-Crowned.

During his pontificate, many of the tertiary orders came into existence. He approved the Franciscan Brothers and Sisters of Penance Rule in 1221 with the bull Memoriale propositi. He also approved the religious congregation "Val des Écoliers" (valley of scholars), which had been founded by four pious professors of theology at the University of Paris, France.

Being a man of learning, Honorius insisted that the clergy receive a thorough education, especially in theology. In the case of a certain Hugh whom the chapter of Chartres had elected bishop, he withheld his approbation because the bishop-elect did not possess sufficient knowledge, quum pateretur in litteratura defectum, as the Pope stated in a letter dated 8 January 1219. He even deprived another bishop of his office on account of illiteracy. Honorius bestowed various privileges upon the University of Paris and University of Bologna, the two greatest seats of learning during those times. In order to facilitate the study of theology in dioceses that were distant from the great centers of learning, he ordered in the bull Super specula Domini that some talented young men should be sent to a recognized theological school to study theology with the purpose of teaching it afterwards in their dioceses.

== Writings ==
Honorius III acquired some fame as an author. The most important of his writings is the Liber censuum Romanae ecclesiae, which is the most valuable source for the medieval position of the Church in regard to property and also serves in part as a continuation of the Liber Pontificalis. It comprises a list of the revenues of the Apostolic See, a record of donations received, privileges granted, and contracts made with cities and rulers. It was begun under Pope Clement III and completed in 1192 under Pope Celestine III. The original manuscript of the Liber Censuum is still in existence (Vaticanus latinus 8486).

Honorius III also wrote a biography of Celestine III; a biography of Gregory VII; an "Ordo Romanus", which is a sort of ceremonial containing the rites of the Church for various occasions; and thirty-four sermons.

Honorius is also purported to be the author of The Grimoire of Pope Honorius. The text was likely forged near the end of the sixteenth century, roughly four hundred years after the death of its supposed author. According to A. E. Waite, "[I]t is a malicious and somewhat clever imposture, which was undeniably calculated to deceive ignorant persons of its period who may have been magically inclined, more especially ignorant priests, since it pretends to convey the express sanction of the Apostolical Seat for the operations of Infernal Magic and Necromancy."

== See also ==
- List of popes
- Cardinals created by Honorius III

== Sources ==
- Collins, Roger (2009). Keepers of the Keys of Heaven: A History of the Papacy. Basic Books.260
- Abbé César Auguste Horoy, Honorii III Romani pontificis opera Omnia 5 vols. (Paris 1879–1882).
- Pietro Pressuti (editor), I regesti del pontefice Onorio III dall anno 1216 al anno 1227 Vol. 1 (Roma 1884).
- J. Clausen, Papst Honorius III (1216–1227). Eine Monographie (Bonn: P. Hauptmann 1895).
- Ferdinand Gregorovius, History of Rome in the Middle Ages, Volume V.1 second edition, revised (London: George Bell, 1906) Book IX, Chapter 3, pp. 96–128.
- Narciso Mengozzi, Papa Onorio III e le sue relazioni col regno di Inghilterra (Siena: L. Lazzeri, 1911).
- Mauro Giacomo Sanna, Onorio III e la Sardegna (1216–1227) (Cagliari: Centro studi filologici sardi, 2013).
- Pierre-Vincent Claverie, Honorius III et l'Orient (1216–1227): Étude et publication de sources inédites des Archives vaticanes (ASV) (Leiden: Brill 2013).
- Thomas W. Smith, Curia and Crusade: Pope Honorius III and the Recovery of the Holy Land, 1216-1227 (Turnhout: Brepols, 2017).
- Initial text taken from a paper copy of the 9th edition of the Encyclopædia Britannica; 1881. Please update as needed.

Catholic Church titles
Preceded by Innocent III	Pope; 1216–1227	Succeeded by Gregory IX
