= Abbey of Val des Écoliers, Verbiesles =

Abbey in Haute-Marne, France

Coordinates: 48°04′43″N 5°10′02″E

Val des Écoliers or Grand Val was a house of Augustinian canons in Verbiesles in the diocese of Langres. Initially a priory, it was raised to an abbey in 1539 by Pope Paul III.

It was founded in 1201 by William the Englishman, a doctor at the University of Paris, and three colleagues. In 1212, Bishop Guillaume de Joinville granted them property in the valley of the Marne. In 1215, he approved the foundation of a monastery. They followed the Rule of Saint Augustine and their statutes were inspired by those of the Abbey of Saint-Victor, Paris. Although the monastery was dedicated to Our Lady, it attracted so many scholars from Paris that it became known as Vallis scholarium, the valley of scholars or val des écoliers. In 1219, with the approval of Pope Honorius III, it became the mother house of a new Augustinian order, the Écoliers du Christ.

In 1234, under Prior Manasses, the monastery was moved 2 kilometres (1.2 mi) down the valley to land donated by Bishop Robert de Thorotte. The original site became known as Vieux-Val and the new as Grand-Val. The old site was not forgotten and pilgrimage processions were regularly led to it.

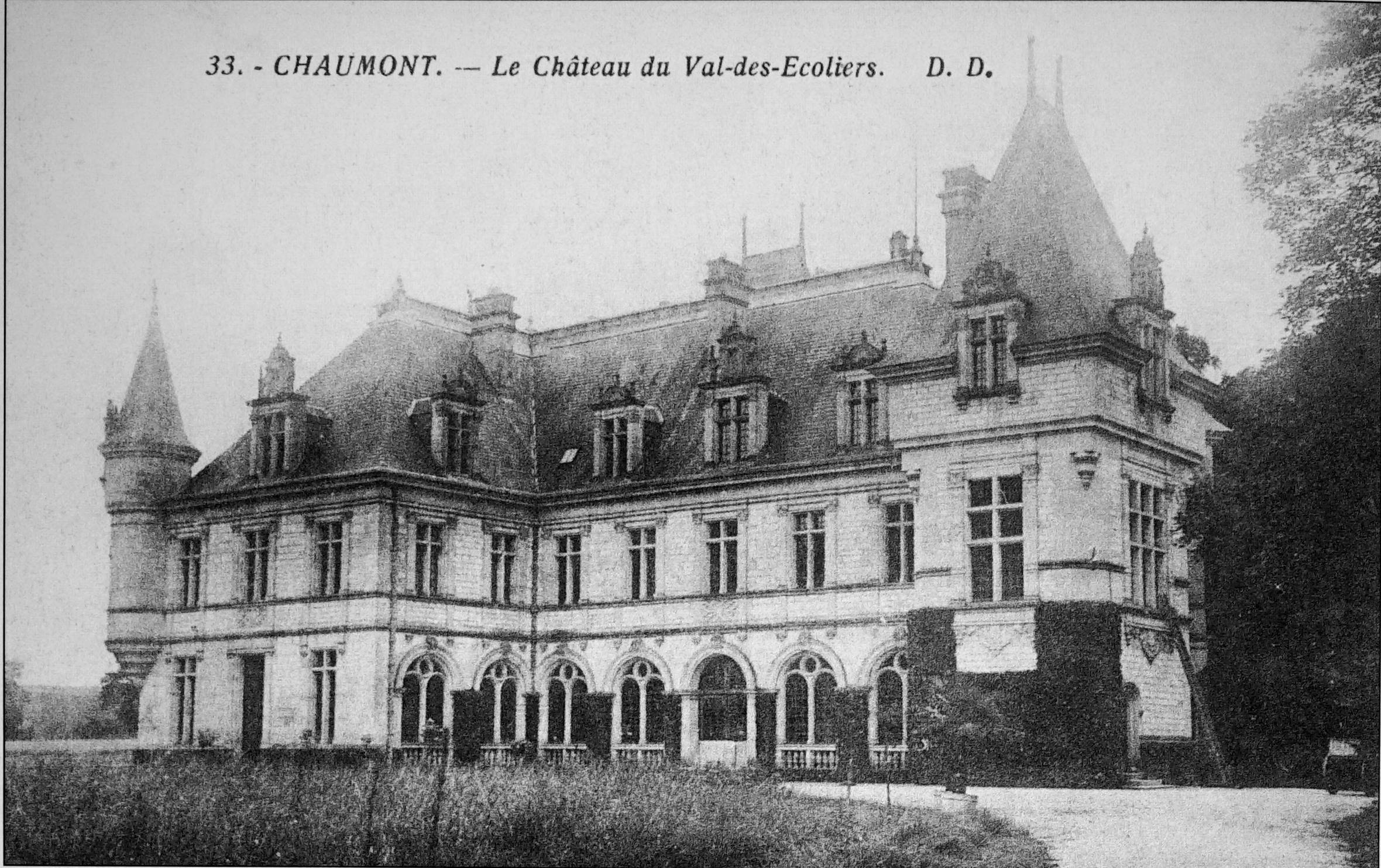
The château around 1900

In 1469, Pope Paul II granted it exemption from the authority of the bishop of Langres. In the 16th century, it was frequently placed in commendam. In 1636, Abbot Laurent Michel united the order to the Congregation of Sainte-Geneviève. A new abbey was constructed in the 17th century, but the buildings were mostly destroyed during the French Revolution. What remains of them was incorporated into a private residence. Known as the Château du Val des Écoliers, it was given by Charles Bourlon de Rouvre to John Joseph Pershing for use as his headquarters during World War I.

== Bibliography ==
- Didier, J. C. (2003). "Val-des-Écoliers, Monastery of". The New Catholic Encyclopedia. Vol. 14 (2nd ed.). The Catholic University of America Press. p. 367.
- Guyon, Catherine (1998). Les écoliers du Christ: l'ordre canonial du Val des Ecoliers, 1201–1539. CERCOR.
- Greenwood, John T., ed. (2021). John J. Pershing and the American Expeditionary Forces in World War I, 1917–1919. Vol. 1: April 7 – September 30, 1917. University Press of Kentucky.
- Sullivan, Thomas (2007). "The Quodlibeta of the Canons Regular and the Monks". In Schabel, Christopher (ed.). Theological Quodlibeta in the Middle Ages: The Fourteenth Century. Brill. pp. 359–400.
