= Albert I of Monaco =

Prince of Monaco from 1889 to 1922

Albert I
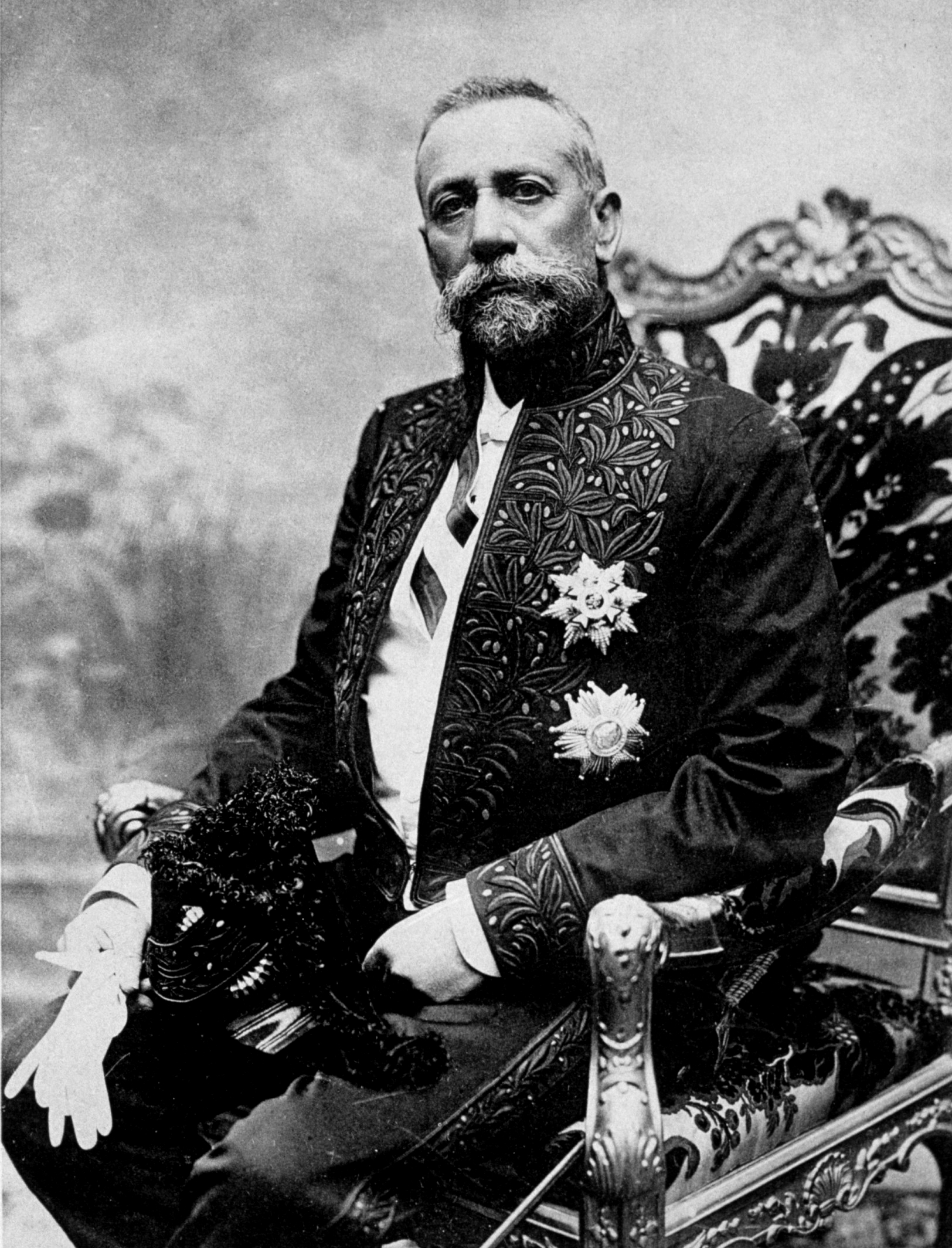
- Prince Albert I of Monaco wearing the uniform circa 1910

Prince of Monaco
- Reign: 10 September 1889 – 26 June 1922
- Predecessor: Charles III
- Successor: Louis II
- Ministers of state: See list: Émile Flach; Georges Jaloustre (acting); Raymond Le Bourdon
- Born: 13 November 1848; Paris, France
- Died: 26 June 1922 (aged 73); Paris, France
- Burial: Saint Nicholas Cathedral, Monaco
- Spouse: Lady Mary Hamilton (m. 1869; ann. 1880); Alice Heine (m. 1889; sep. 1902)
- Issue: Louis II, Prince of Monaco
Names
- Albert Honoré Charles Grimaldi
- House: Grimaldi
- Father: Charles III, Prince of Monaco
- Mother: Antoinette de Mérode

Albert I (Albert Honoré Charles Grimaldi; 13 November 1848 – 26 June 1922) was Prince of Monaco from 10 September 1889 until his death in 1922. He devoted much of his life to oceanography, exploration and science. Alongside his expeditions, Albert I's reign oversaw major reforms on political, social, and economic levels, with the Monégasque Revolution leading to the end of absolute monarchy and his promulgation of a constitution in 1911.

== Early life ==
Born on 13 November 1848 in Paris, France, the son of Prince Charles III (1818–1889), and Countess Antoinette Ghislaine de Merode (1828–1864), a Belgian noblewoman, maternal aunt of Donna Maria Vittoria dal Pozzo, Princess della Cisterna, Duchess consort of Aosta and Queen consort of Spain.

As a young man, Prince Albert served in the Spanish Navy as a navigator. During the Franco-Prussian War, he joined the French Navy where he was awarded the Legion of Honor. In addition to his interest in oceanographic studies, Albert had a keen interest in the origins of man and in Paris, he founded the "Institute for Human Paleontology" that was responsible for a number of archeological digs. The "Grimaldi Man" found in the Baousse-Rousse cave was named in his honour. Albert's intellectual achievements gained him worldwide recognition and in 1909, the British Academy of Science made him a member.

== First marriage ==
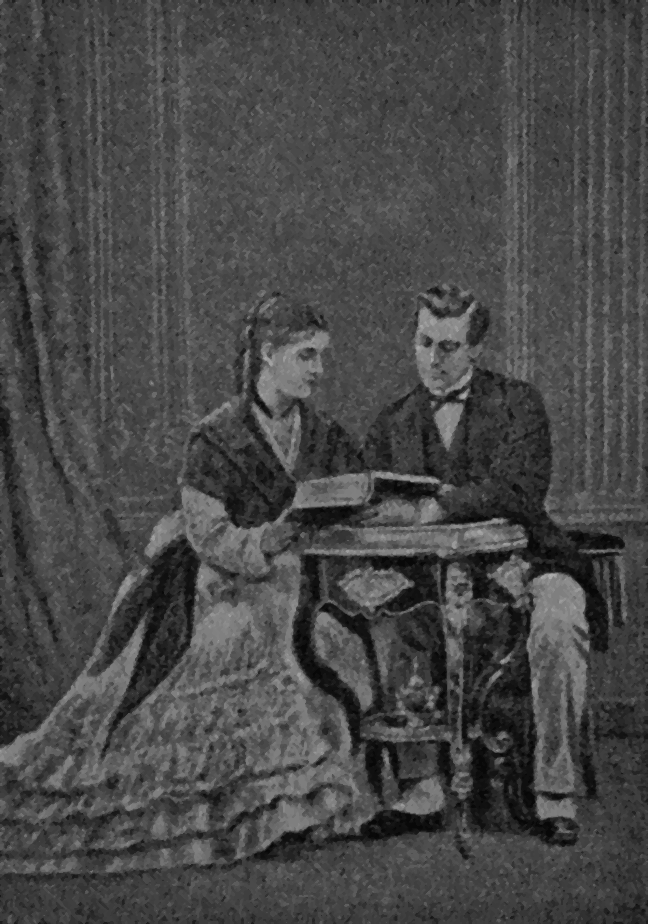
Prince Albert with his first wife Lady Mary Victoria Hamilton shortly after their wedding

On 21 September 1869 at the Château de Marchais (which is still in the possession of the Grimaldi family today) in Champagne, Prince Albert was married to Lady Mary Victoria Hamilton (1850–1922), of Lanarkshire, Scotland, a daughter of the 11th Duke of Hamilton and his wife, Princess Marie Amelie of Baden. The couple met for the first time in August 1869 at a ball hosted by the Emperor and Empress of France; their marriage had been arranged by Albert's grandmother Caroline.

Caroline had tried to make a match between Albert and Princess Mary Adelaide of Cambridge, the first cousin of Queen Victoria, and sought the help of Napoléon III (Louis-Napoléon Bonaparte) and his wife, Empress Eugénie. The Emperor convinced Caroline that Queen Victoria would never allow a relative of hers to marry into a family who made a living out of gambling. He then suggested Mary, his third cousin once removed and sister of his good friend, the 12th Duke of Hamilton, as a suitable alternative. Mary was a granddaughter of Charles, Grand Duke of Baden and related by blood to the French Imperial family through her maternal grandmother Stéphanie de Beauharnais, Emperor Napoléon I's adopted daughter and second cousin of Napoléon III's mother, Hortense de Beauharnais. The Hamiltons were well aware of the extent of Monaco's estate, which was no bigger than theirs, but were sufficiently impressed by its status as an independent principality. The couple married at Château de Marchais on 21 September 1869.

Within a year of their marriage, the couple's only child (Louis) was born, but Mary disliked Monaco and found the Mediterranean too hot. While Albert was away fighting in the Franco-Prussian war, she left Monaco permanently. The couple divorced and their marriage was annulled by the Church on 3 January 1880, although a special provision was made by the Vatican to allow Louis to remain legitimate in the eyes of the Church. Civilly, the marriage was dissolved on 28 July 1880, by the Order of Prince Charles III. That same year, the former Princess of Monaco remarried in Florence, Italy, to a Hungarian Prince Tassilo Festetics von Tolna.

== Accession and second marriage ==
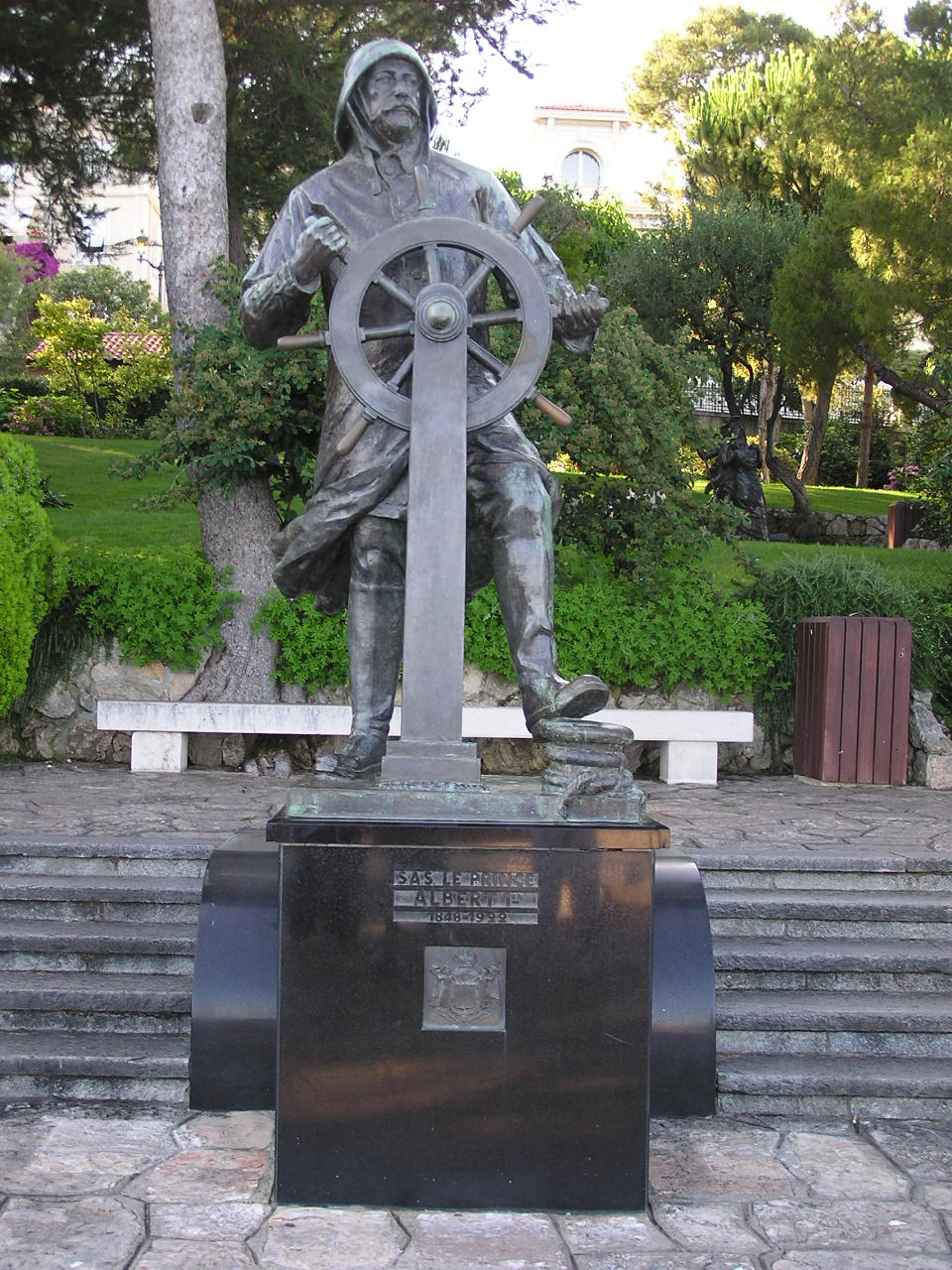
A statue of Albert as a seafarer in Monaco-Ville's St Martin Gardens.

On 10 September 1889, Albert ascended the throne of Monaco on the death of his father. On 30 October of the same year, he married the Dowager Duchess de Richelieu, née Marie Alice Heine (1858–1925) in Paris. The American daughter of a New Orleans building contractor of German-Jewish descent, Alice Heine had married the Duc de Richelieu but had been widowed by age 21 and left with a young son, Armand. Her marriage to Prince Albert proved an equal blessing for him and the tiny principality of Monaco, since Alice brought a strong business acumen, well in advance of her youth. Having helped put her husband's principality on a sound financial footing, she would devote her energies to making Monaco one of Europe's great cultural centers, with an opera, theater, and a ballet under the direction of the famed Russian impresario Serge Diaghilev.

Despite the initial success of the marriage of Prince Albert and Princess Alice, in 1902, they separated legally, without issue, though did not divorce. According to Anne Edwards' book The Grimaldis of Monaco, this was due to the Princess's friendship with the composer Isidore de Lara. By the same token, the courtesan Caroline Otero, La Belle Otero, who had served him as a high class prostitute between 1893 and 1897, recalled Albert fondly in her memoirs and claimed that he was not a virile man and suffered from erection difficulty. Princess Alice had La Belle Otero banned from the principality in 1897 for being seen with her husband.

== Later life ==
In March 1910, there were mass protests against his rule. The Monegasques demanded a constitution and a parliament to rein in the absolute monarch or else they would overthrow him and establish a republic. They were dissatisfied about French domination of the principality's politics and economy. There was severe unemployment, as the principality lacked factories and farmland, and the casinos did not allow citizens to work there. On 5 January 1911, Prince Albert I granted Monaco a constitution, but the document had little real meaning in terms of reducing autocratic rule and was soon suspended by the Prince when World War I broke out. Also in 1911, Prince Albert created the Monte Carlo Rally, an automobile race designed to draw tourists to Monaco and the Casino.

Royal Monogram of Prince Albert I of Monaco

Despite his military service, or perhaps because of it, the Prince became a pacifist, establishing the International Institute of Peace in Monaco as a place to develop a peaceful settlement for conflict through arbitration. In the tension-filled times leading up to World War I, Prince Albert made numerous attempts to dissuade Germany's Kaiser Wilhelm II from war.

When war came, Prince Albert could not avoid becoming involved. In one incident, he even wrote personally to the Kaiser in an effort to ameliorate the consequences of Gen. Karl von Bülow's wrath. Without the Prince's intervention, the French villages of Sissonne and Marchais would have been destroyed. In the "Great War to End All Wars", Monaco declared its neutrality, but in fact, provided the Allied forces with hospitals, convalescent centers, and soldiers, including Prince Albert's only son, Louis.

Albert died on 26 June 1922 in Paris, France, and was succeeded by his son, Louis II.

== Oceanography, paleontology, geography ==
Prince Albert I of Monaco devoted much of his life to the study of the sea and oceans, and Monaco diplomats around the world forwarded scientific papers to him. At 22 years old, he embarked on a career in the then relatively new science of oceanography. Understanding the importance of the relationship between living creatures and their environment, he devised a number of techniques and instruments for measurement and exploration. Albert I was also the “instigator and promulgator” of the oceanographic science he contributed to create. He founded the Institut océanographique de Paris, Foundation Albert I, Prince of Monaco in 1906, a private foundation recognized of public utility. It has two buildings: The Oceanographic Institute of Paris, now renamed Ocean House (Maison de l'océan) and what became the world-renowned Oceanographic Museum of Monaco. This includes an aquarium, a museum, and a library, with research facilities in Paris.

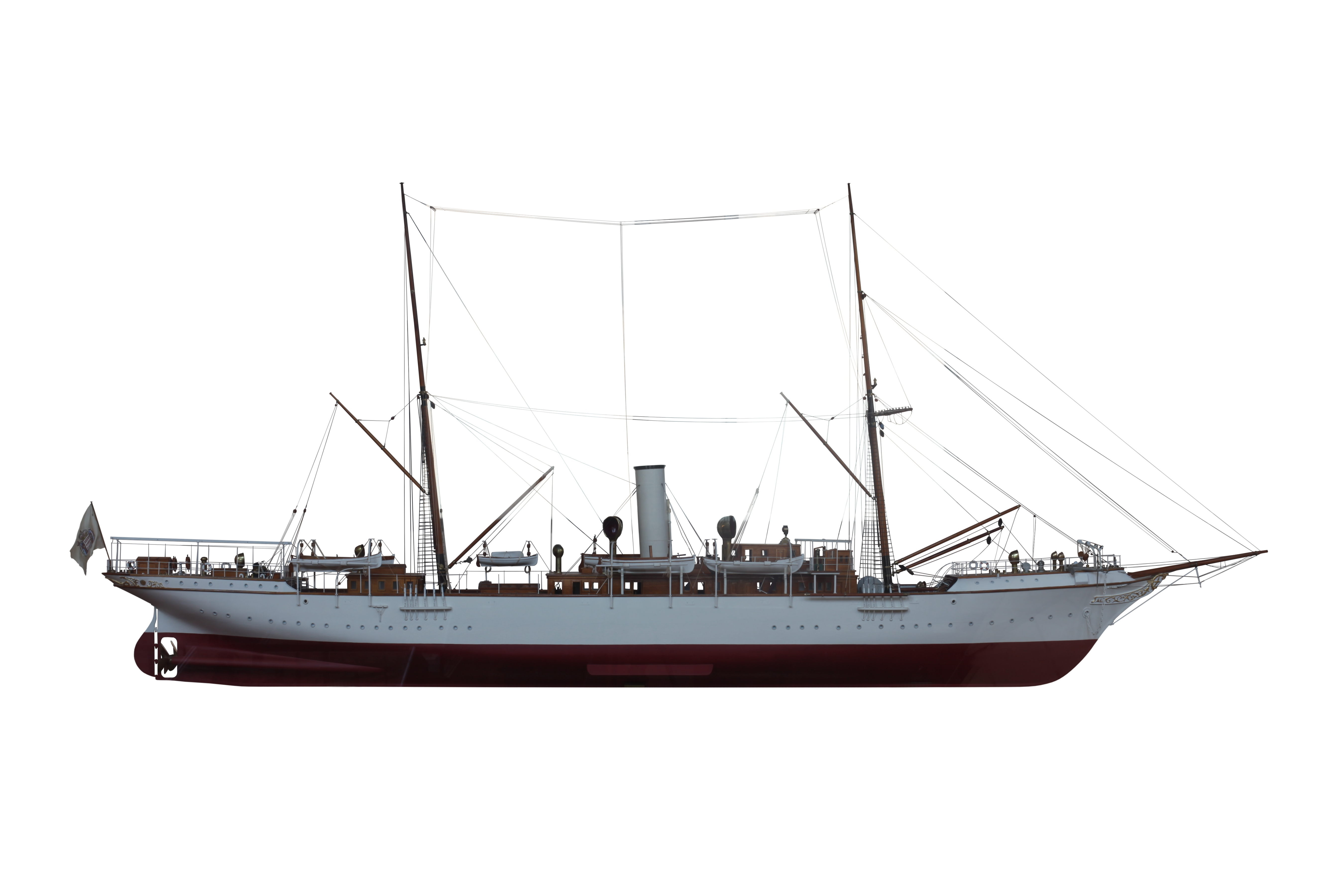
Scale model of Hirondelle II. On display at the Oceanographic Museum.

He owned four, increasingly impressive research yachts, Hirondelle, Princesse Alice, Princesse Alice II and Hirondelle II. Accompanied by some of the world's leading marine scientists, he travelled the length and breadth of the Mediterranean, making numerous oceanographic studies, maps and charts. In 1896, on an oceanographic survey of the Azores, he discovered the Princess Alice Bank.

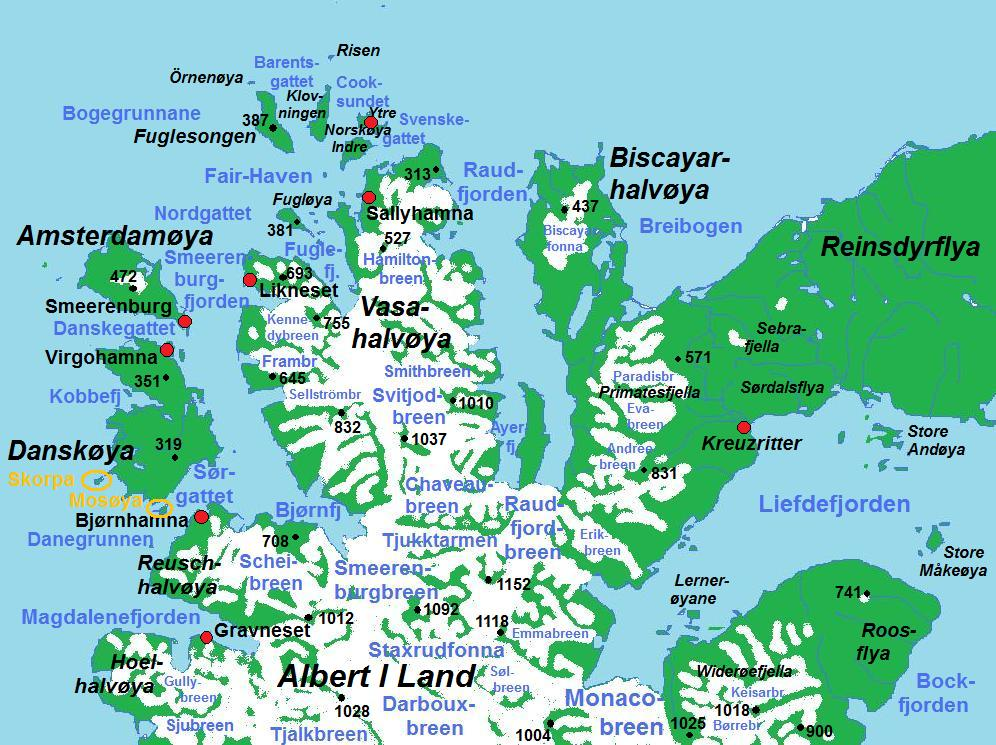
Map of the northern part of Albert I Land.

From an early age, Prince Albert I of Monaco evidenced a strong fascination for the polar regions. In the years 1898-1907 he made four scientific cruises to Svalbard on his yacht Princesse Alice. His efforts are honored by the later naming of Albert I Land on Spitsbergen.

The first cruise in the summer of 1898 was an oceanographical and zoological reconnaissance, aimed mainly at adding to the collections of the Oceanographic Museum of Monaco, for which the construction had just started.

On the second expedition, in 1899, the focus was on the hydrography and topography of Raudfjorden, on the north-western tip of Spitsbergen, of which a map was published. His efforts are acknowledged by the later naming of Albert I Land, which comprises the part of Spitsbergen west of Raudfjorden.

The third trip, in 1906, meteorology was added to the range of observations and surveys were pursued. The Prince also provided support for two other expeditions, that of the Scotsman, William Bruce, to Prins Karls Forland, and that of the Norwegian, Gunnar Isachsen, to northwestern Spitsbergen. His funding of the latter lead to regular Norwegian scientific expeditions on Svalbard, and in 1928 the foundation of the Norwegian Polar Institute.

The Prince's fourth expedition in 1907, was aimed at completing the results from the previous summer. Prince Albert also lent his support, either financially, or through gifts or loans of oceanographic instruments, to numerous Arctic and Antarctic explorers. The same year, he provided funds and support for the foundation of the Friends of the French National Museum of Natural History Society. In 1909 he joined the Société de Géographie and the British Academy. In 1910 the Prince was the main founder of the Institute of Human Paleontology (Institut de paléontologie humaine) in Paris, close to the Jardin des plantes which is the seat of the French National Museum of Natural History. Finally, he showed a keen interest in environmental protection, especially in Svalbard. This is demonstrated by his responses to a questionnaire that Hugo Conwentz, a German botanist sent him in 1912.

In 1918, the US National Academy of Sciences awarded Prince Albert its Alexander Agassiz Medal for his achievements. The Explorers Club elected Albert I to its highest category of membership — Honorary Member — in 1921. He was also awarded the Cullum Geographical Medal of the American Geographical Society. Prince Rainier of Monaco and the International Association for the Physical Sciences of the Oceans established the Prince Albert I Medal in the physical and chemical sciences of the oceans in his honor.

== INTERPOL ==
Prince Albert I played a pioneering role in the early development of international police cooperation. He was the driving force behind the idea of an international criminal police organization. In April 1914, at his personal invitation, the first International Criminal Police Congress convened in Monaco. The gathering brought together police officials and legal experts from 24 countries to explore avenues for cross-border collaboration, including joint crime-solving efforts, standardized identification methods, and extradition procedures. Although the outbreak of World War I postponed further progress, this congress laid the essential groundwork for what would eventually become INTERPOL in 1923.

== Philately ==
Albert I amassed a collection of postage stamps. The collection was later continued by Louis II and finally became part of the postal museum Rainier III that created in 1950.

== Numismatics ==
Albert I was featured on a €2 commemorative coin issued by the Principality of Monaco in 2022.

== Honours ==
Decorations

- Monaco: Grand Master of the Order of St. Charles
- Austria-Hungary: Decoration of Honour for Arts and Sciences, 1912
- Baden: Grand Cross of the Military Karl-Friedrich Merit Order
- Kingdom of Bavaria: Knight of St. Hubert, 1900
- Empire of Brazil: Grand Cross of the Order of the Rose, 21 August 1888
- France:
  - Grand Cross of the Legion of Honour
  - Commemoration Medal of the 1870–1871 War
- Kingdom of Italy: Knight of the Annunciation, with Collar, 25 April 1910
- Persia: Order of the Lion and the Sun, 1st Class, 14 January 1915
- Kingdom of Prussia: Knight of the Black Eagle, with Collar
- Sweden-Norway:
  - Grand Cross of St. Olav, with Collar, 30 March 1875
  - Knight of the Seraphim, with Collar, 17 June 1894
- United States:
  - Medal of Alexander Agassiz, 1918
  - Medal of Cullum Geography, 1921
- Württemberg: Grand Cross of the Württemberg Crown, 1880
- Spain:
  - Grand Cross of the Order of Charles III, 27 January 1878
  - Grand Cross of Naval Merit, with White Decoration, 24 July 1886

== Ancestry ==
Ancestors of Albert I of Monaco

16. Honoré III, Prince of Monaco
8. Honoré IV, Prince of Monaco
17. Maria Caterina Brignole Sale
4. Florestan I, Prince of Monaco
18. Louis Marie d'Aumont, 6th Duke of Aumont
9. Louise Félicité d'Aumont, Duchess Mazarin
19. Louise Jeanne de Durfort, Duchess Mazarin
2. Charles III, Prince of Monaco
20. Thomas Gibert
10. Charles-Thomas Gibert
21. Françoise Moret
5. Maria Caroline Gibert de Lametz
22. François Louis Michel Le Gras de Vaubercey
11. Marie Françoise Le Gras de Vaubercey
23. Gabrielle Françoise des Courtils
1.Albert I, Prince of Monaco
24. Philippe-Maximilien de Merode, Marquis van Westerloo
12. Guillaume-Charles, Count de Merode, Prince de Rubempré
25. Marie Catherine de Merode, Princess de Rubempré et d'Everberghe
6. Count Werner Jean-Baptiste de Merode
26. Othon-Henri d'Ongnies, Count de Mastaing, Prince van Grimberghen
13. Marie Joséphine d'Ongnies, Countess of Mastaing, Princess of Grimberghe
27. Marie de Merode
3. Countess Antoinette Ghislaine de Merode
28. Count Charles de Spangen d'Uyternesse
14. Count François Louis de Spangen d'Uyternesse
29. Marie Anne de Croix dit de Drumez
7. Countess Victoire de Spangen d'Uyternesse
30. Jacques Albert, Baron de Flaveau de Henry de la Raudière
15. Baroness Louise Xavière de Flaveau de Henry de la Raudière
31. Ernestine Henriette de Cassal de Ny

== Notes ==
Albert I of Monaco House of Grimaldi Cadet branch of the House of Matignon Born: 13 November 1848 Died: 26 June 1922
Regnal titles
Preceded by Charles III	Prince of Monaco; 1889–1922	Succeeded by Louis II
Monegasque royalty
Preceded by Charles III	Hereditary Prince of Monaco; 1856–1889	Succeeded by Louis II
Preceded by Charles III	Marquis of Baux; 1856–1889	Succeeded by Louis II
Titles of nobility
Preceded by Charles III of Monaco	Duke of Valentinois; 1889–1919; 1889–1922	Succeeded by Princess Charlotte (de facto); Louis II (de jure)
