= Treaty of Stupinigi =

1817 treaty between Sardinia and Monaco

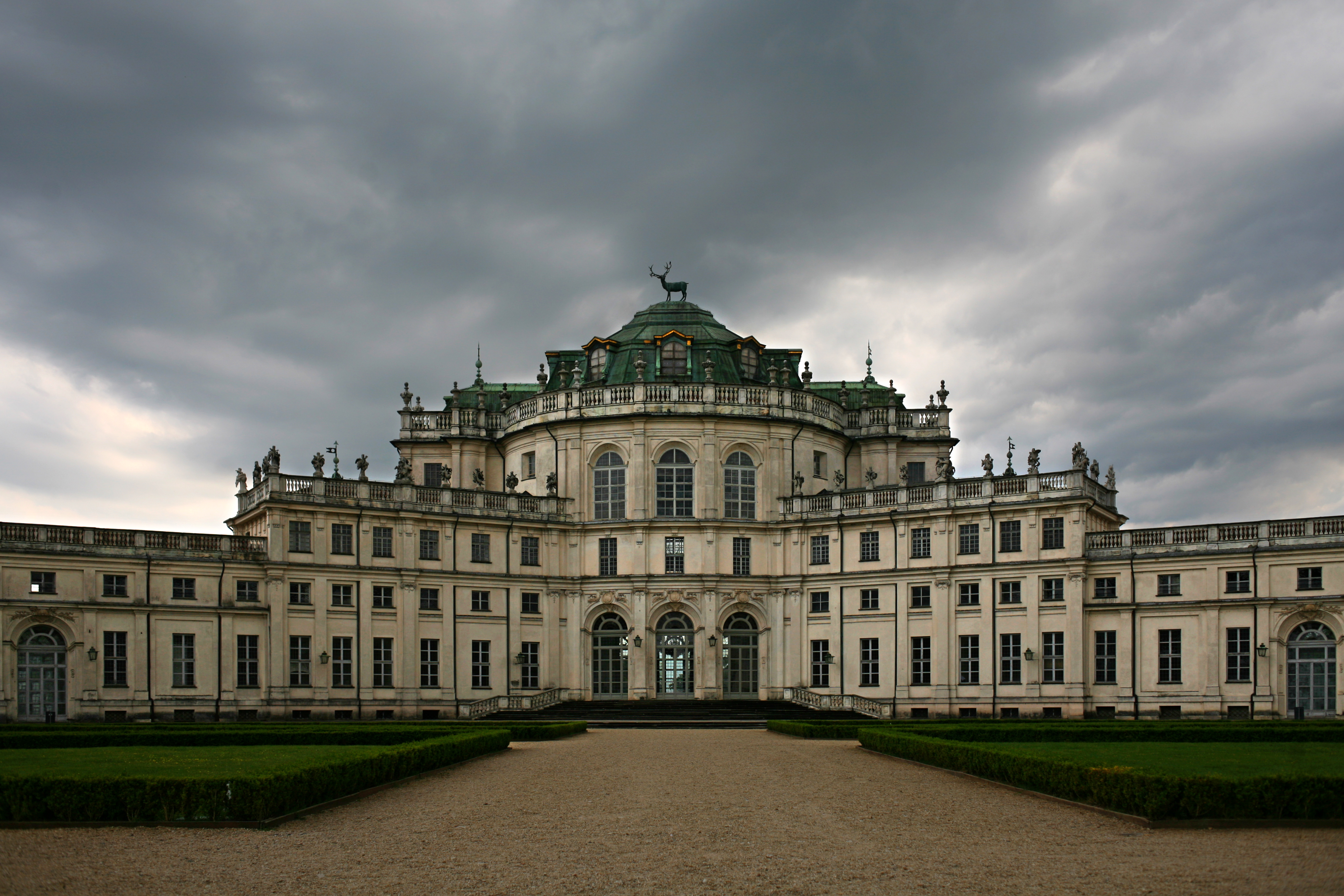
- Signed: November 8, 1817
- Location: Stupinigi, Kingdom of Sardinia
- Signatories: (Kingdom of Sardinia) Victor Emmanuel I; (Monaco) Honoré V
- Parties: Kingdom of Sardinia; Principality of Monaco

The Treaty of Stupinigi was signed on November 8 and 10 1817, in Stupinigi between Honoré V, Prince of Monaco, and Victor Emmanuel I of Sardinia.

== Background: the aftermath of the Congress of Vienna in 1815 ==
After the fall of the First French Empire, the second Treaty of Paris signed on November 20, 1815, replaced the protection of the King of France for that of the King of Piedmont-Sardinia. However, in the aftermath of the Congress of Vienna, and after the death of his father Honoré IV, the new Prince Honoré V was reduced to a "puppet" and saw no alternative to giving in to unceasing Sardinian demands. In 1817, Honoré V put his signature to the Treaty of Stupinigi under which he officially transferred both Monaco's internal administration and military sovereignty.

The treaty of Stupinigi took the place of the Treaty of Péronne of 1641 by which Prince Honoré II had permitted Monaco to become a French protectorate in return for guarantees entailing the preservation of his rights as sovereign. The treaty of Stupinigi was intended to follow the same policies. However, two days after the treaty was signed a commercial agreement established a customs union between the neighbouring territories that imposed heavy sacrifices on the Principality. It therefore had the effect of placing Monaco under "the unwelcome Protectorate of the King of Sardinia from 1815–1860".

The treaty was signed at the Palazzina di caccia di Stupinigi, a hunting lodge built on the grand scale, designed by the architect Filippo Juvarra for Vittorio Amedeo II of Savoia.

== Content: an old treaty and a new convention ==
The Treaty of Stupinigi established diplomatic relations between the Kingdom of Sardinia and the Principality of Monaco and imposed "a near protectorate by the House of Savoy" on the Principality of Monaco.

Based on the model of the treaty of Péronne, the main clauses of the 14-article treaty of Stupinigi would allow for the Principality of Monaco to be garrisoned by a half battalion of infantry under the command of the Prince, appointed Governatore della Piazza (Governor of the Square), in whose hands the Sardinian officers would take the oath. The Prince would retain his prerogatives even in the event that the troops increased. The expenses for the maintenance of the garrison were to be charged to the King. The Monegasque subjects could have access to various administrative careers in the Kingdom of Sardinia and offices, honors and favors would be granted to the Prince and his family. The Sardinian Navy would protect the port of Monaco and its stronghold. Communications between the two states were to be free; the right of asylum could not be granted in the Principality for evildoers and deserters; the anchorage rights in the port would be the same for the Sardinians as for the Monegasques.

To the Treaty, a 15-article convention was added which incorporated the Principality into the Kingdom of Sardinia, prohibiting the production and commerce of tobacco, and imposing the gabella salt tax, as well as the unification of the postal services with a share of the profits.

== Aftermath of the Treaty ==
=== Protected by Sardinia but attached to Paris ===
Though the Treaty of Stupinigi would have allowed the Monegasque Princely family to, none of its members tried to seek from the King of Sardinia the honors, the offices and the favors that the Treaty offered them. Instead, they continued to frequent Paris, as Honored V later did, who sat in the French Chamber of Peers, in their capacity as Duke of Valentinois. The influence of France was such even under the Sardinian protectorate that Honoré V re-established the use of the French language for public acts, abandoned in 1814 when the Sardinians first imposed their rule on the Principality.

=== The rebellion of 1848 and the role of Sardinia ===
In 1848, the towns of Roquebrune and Menton, which constituted the eastern extremity of Monaco, successfully rebelled and were detached by Sardinia from Monaco and joined to the district of Nice, forcing Prince Florestan to give up the largest part of Monegasque territory. Against the local plebiscite supported by the Kingdom of Sardinia, the prince of Monaco protested both at the court of France and at the court of Turin; he also contested the electoral results, reiterating that he was the legitimate ruler of Menton under the Vienna treaties of 1815 and appealing to the signatory powers of international agreements, in vain.

=== The return of sovereignty following the Treaty of Turin in 1860 ===
Following the Treaty of Turin of March 1860, the commander of the Sardinian garrison on the Rock had already notified, on the following July 17, to the governor general of the Principality (in the absence of the Prince) the withdrawal of his troops for the next day, following an agreement by which "the protection of the Principality of Monaco is handed over by the King [of Sardinia] to His Majesty the Emperor of the French".

The Franco-Monegasque Treaty of 1861 reaffirmed the Princely Crown in the fullness of its sovereignty. The Principality was recognized as a "sovereign and independent State" by the French Ministry of Foreign Affairs in its notification of the new treaty to the foreign chancelleries.

While the Sardinian government was willing to cede the rights of protectorate over Monaco to France, Napoleon III refused to impose a protectorate on the principality. Charles III could only replace the Treaty of Stupinigi with a "good neighbor policy" on November 9, 1865. The pact between the two states was to be in force for five years and was to be maintained by tacit agreement.

== See also ==
- List of treaties

== Sources ==
- Solaro de La Marguerite, Clément (1836). "1817, 7 novembre: "Articles de protection accordée par S. M. le Roi de Sardaigne à la Principauté de Monaco; 1817, 9 novembre, "Articles arrêtés entre les Plénipotentiaires de S. M. le Roi de Sardaigne et ceux du Prince de Monaco en exécution des articles de protection du 8 novembre", p. 378.". Traités publics de la Royale Maison de Savoie'. Vol. IV. Torino: Imprimerie Royale.
