= Hôtel de Ville, Menton =

Town hall in Menton, France

Hôtel de Ville
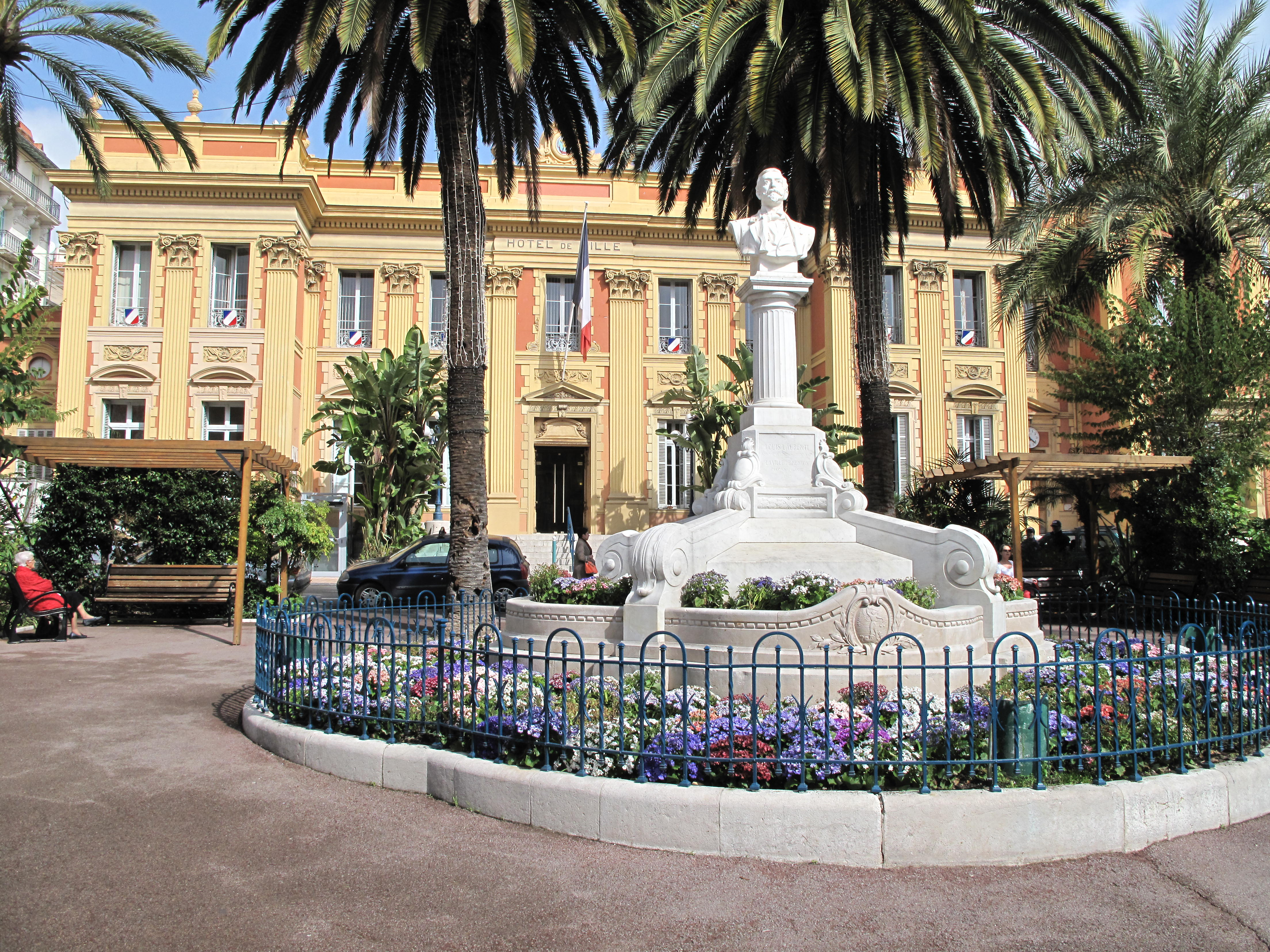
- The main frontage of the Hôtel de Ville in April 2014
- Interactive map of the Hôtel de Ville area

General information
- Type: City hall
- Architectural style: Neoclassical style
- Location: Menton, France
- Coordinates: 43.7757°N 7.5028°E
- Completed: 1861

Design and construction
- Architect: Victor Sabatier

The Hôtel de Ville (French pronunciation: [otɛl də vil], City Hall) is a municipal building in Menton, Alpes-Maritimes in southeastern France, standing on Rue de la République.

== History ==
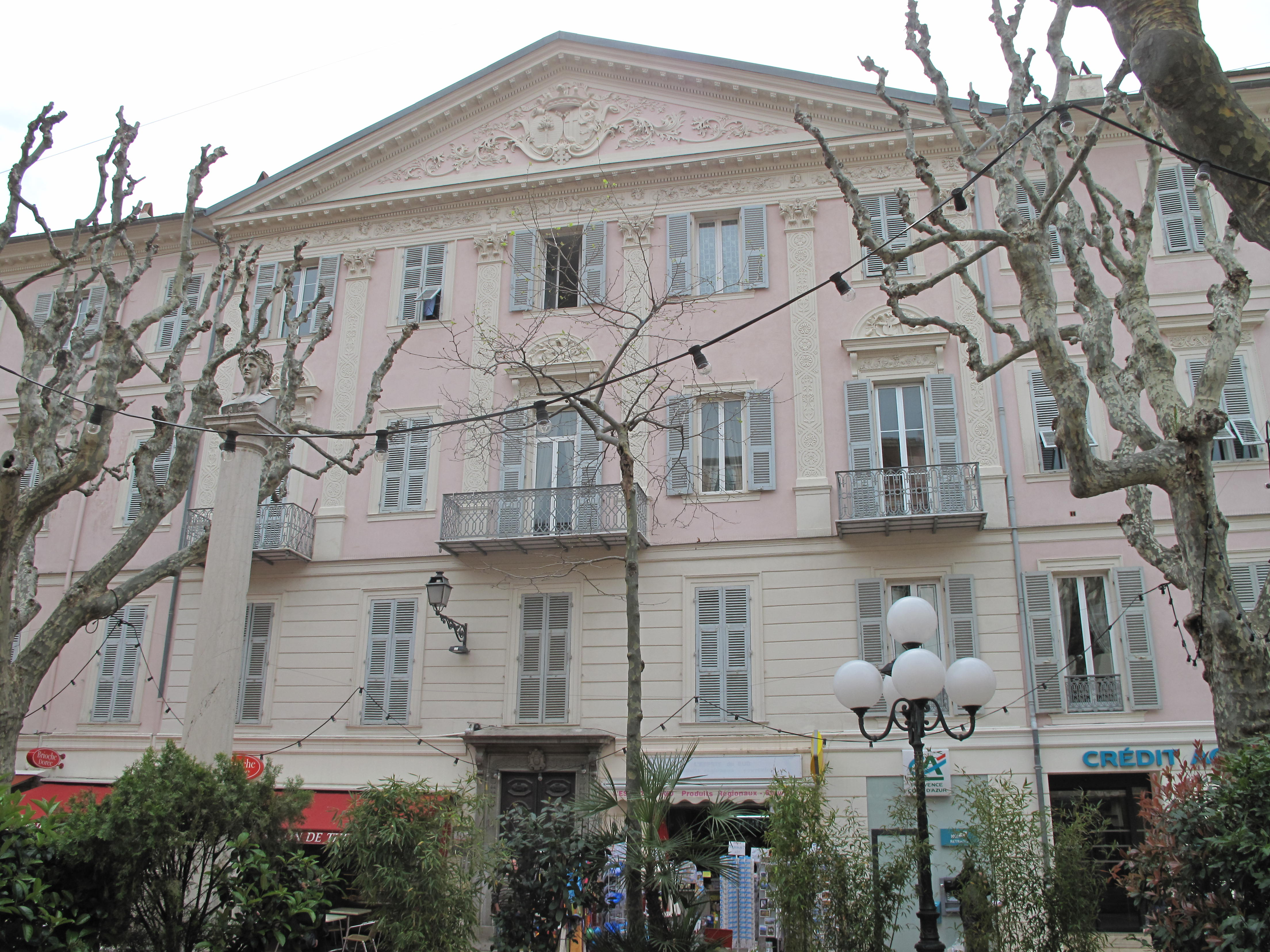
The Hôtel Trenca de Monléon, which served as the town hall from 1881 to 1901

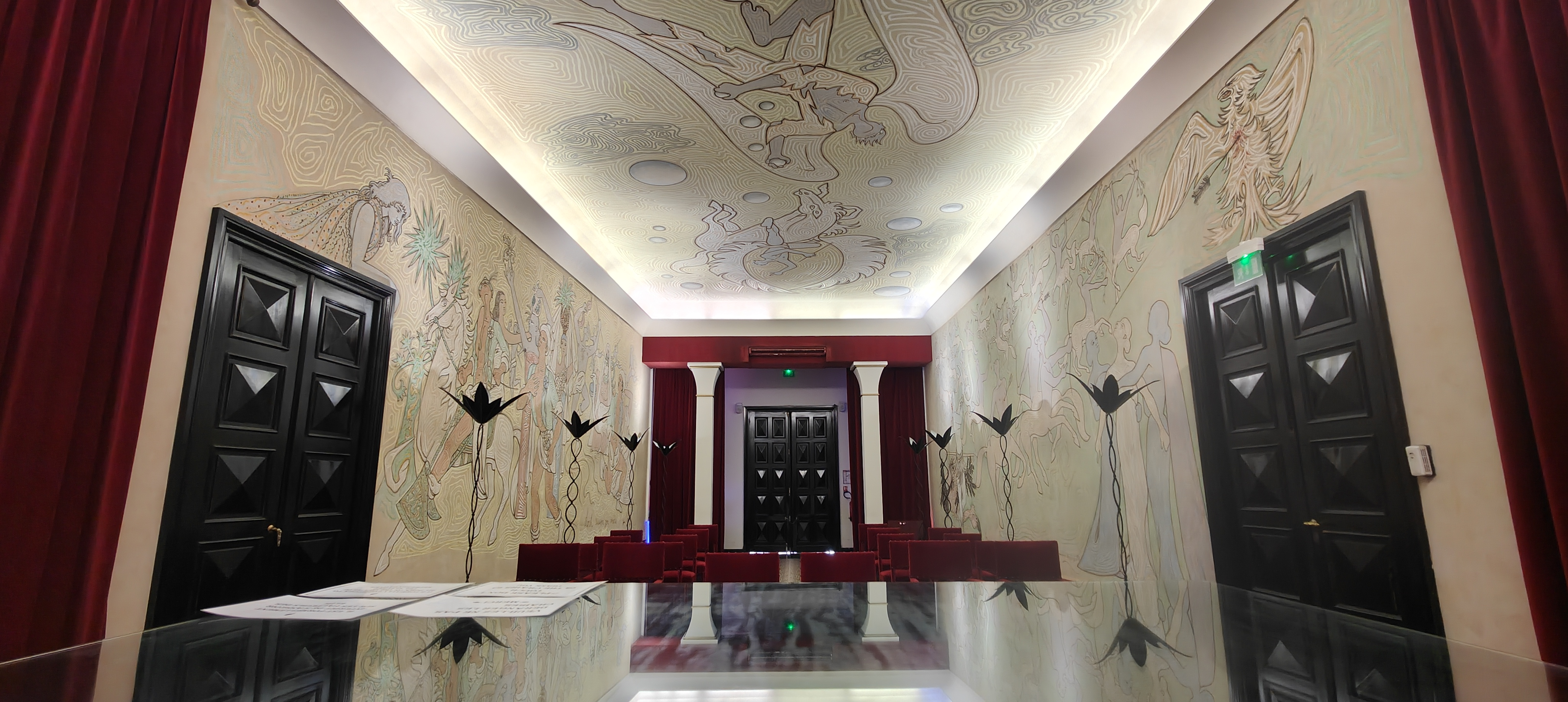
The Salle des Mariages (wedding room), which was decorated by Jean Cocteau

=== The Hôtel Trenca de Monléon ===
After the town was forcibly annexed by the French First Republic in 1792, the new town council initially met in the Couvent des Capucins (Convent of the Capuchins), which was adjacent to the Chapelle des Pénitents Noirs (Chapel of the Black Penitents) in Rue Général Galliéni. This arrangement continued until 1881, when the council relocated to the Hôtel Trenca de Monléon, on what is now Place Clémenceau.

The Hôtel Trenca de Monléon was commissioned by the governor of the town, Honoré de Monléon, who was of Italian descent. It was designed in the neoclassical style, built in brick with a stucco finish and was completed in 1780. The design involved a symmetrical main frontage of 17 bays facing onto Place Clémenceau. It featured shop fronts on the ground floor and was fenestrated by casement windows on the three floors above. The bays on the upper storeys of the central section of five bays were flanked by Corinthian order pilasters which supported an entablature and a modillioned pediment with a coat of arms in the tympanum.

After Honoré de Monléon's death in 1809, the house passed to his daughter, Henriette de Monléon, who, in 1821, married Charles Trenca, a sub-lieutenant who served under Honoré V, Prince of Monaco and who went on to become governor of the Free Cities of Menton and Roquebrune when those town ceded from Monaco in 1848. The house became the Hôtel d'Angleterre in the early 1870s, then the Hôtel Bristol in 1878, and then the town hall in 1881. After it was no longer required for municipal purposes, it became an apartment building.

=== The current building ===
In the early 20th century, the municipal engineers advised that the 1887 Liguria earthquake had rendered the Hôtel Trenca de Monléon structurally unsafe and the town council led by the mayor, Émile Biovès, decided to acquire alternative premises. The building they selected was the former Cercle des Étrangers (the Foreigners' Club). The building had been commissioned by Nicolas Honoré Jean Baptiste, 3rd baron Ardoïno, who was an accomplished botanist and founder of the Cercle Philharmonique de Menton (Menton Philharmonic Club). The building was designed by Victor Sabatier in the neoclassical style, built in brick with a stucco finish and was completed in 1861.

The design involved a symmetrical main frontage of nine bays facing onto Rue de la République with the last two bays at each end projected forward. The central bay featured a square headed doorway with a triangular pediment, and a casement window on the first floor. The other bays were fenestrated in a similar style and were flanked by Corinthian order pilasters supporting an entablature and a parapet, which was surmounted by a central medallion depicting the Archangel Michael defending the town, as well as a series of urns. The building continued to serve as the Cercle des Étrangers until Ardoïno's death in 1874, when it became the Théâtre des Folies Bergères. In the 1890s, it served as the Grand Casino. It was acquired by the council in June 1898 and, after conversion, re-opened as the town hall in 1901. A bust of the former mayor, Louis Laurenti, was created by the sculptor, Léopold Bernhard Bernstamm, and installed in front of the town hall in 1919.

Following the Italian invasion of France in June 1940, the town was evacuated and the council relocated to Prades. The town came under German occupation in September 1943 and was eventually liberated by Allied troops on 6 September 1944. In the 1950s, the mayor, Francis Palmero, decided to adapt the former courtroom, to the east of the town hall, to accommodate the Salle des Mariages (wedding room). He invited Jean Cocteau to decorate the room before it re-opened in March 1958.

The minister of state of Monaco, Christophe Mirmand, visited the town hall and held discussions with council leaders about cross-border issues on 12 December 2025.
