= Antoinette de Mérode =

Princess of Monaco from 1856 to 1864

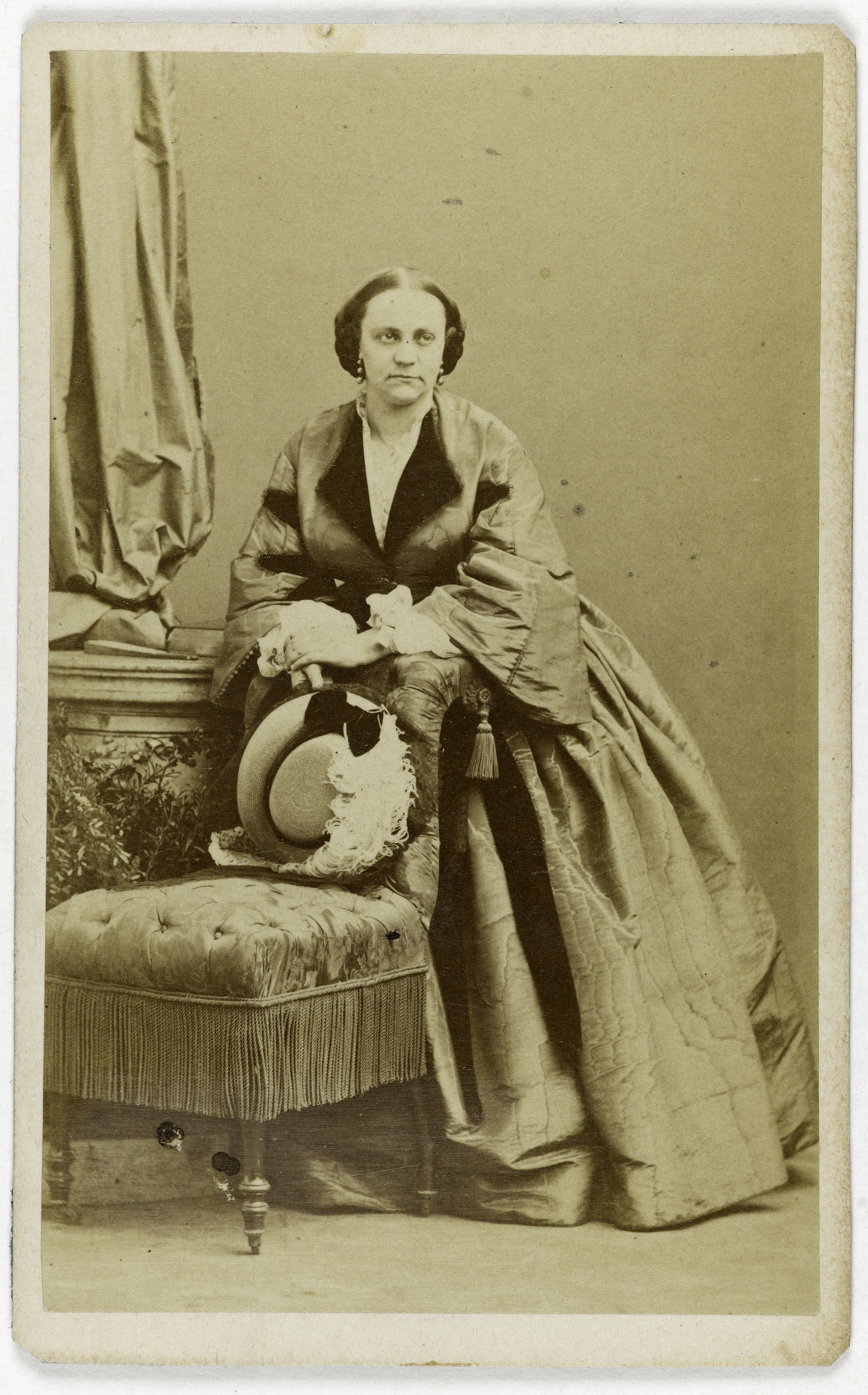

Princess consort of Monaco
- Tenure: 1856–1864
- Born: 28 September 1828; Brussels, Netherlands
- Died: 10 February 1864 (aged 35); Paris, France
- Burial: Cathedral of Our Lady Immaculate
- Spouse: Charles III, Prince of Monaco (m. 1846)
- Issue: Albert I, Prince of Monaco
Names
- Antoinette Ghislaine de Merode
- House: Merode
- Father: Werner de Merode
- Mother: Victoire de Spangen d'Uyternesse

Antoinette Ghislaine de Merode (28 September 1828 – 10 February 1864) was Princess of Monaco by marriage to Charles III, Prince of Monaco.

== Life ==
Antoinette was born in Brussels as the daughter of Count Werner de Merode and his spouse, Countess Victoire de Spangen d'Uyternesse. She was the sister of Louise de Mérode and maternal aunt of Maria Vittoria dal Pozzo, who was, for three years, Queen of Spain.

On her eighteenth birthday, in Brussels, she married Charles III of Monaco. It was a double wedding with her older sister, Louise. Thanks to her dowry, Charles was able to finance the embellishment of Monte Carlo in order to attract wealthy tourists to the principality.

The couple was given an official welcome in Monaco after the wedding, but preferred to live in France, where Antoinette acquired for herself the Château de Marchais, and where the couple preferred to live rather than in Monaco. On 13 November 1848, she gave birth to their son, Albert. The marriage was described as a happy one, and Charles referred to her as an angel. Known by the title Duchess de Valentinois in Paris, she became a popular member of the high society life of Second French Empire.

She often attended the French Imperial court, where she was introduced to Empress Eugenie by Antoinette's mother-in-law. Antoinette was present at French court during the state visit of Queen Victoria of the United Kingdom in 1855, during which she and her mother-in-law reportedly decided to arrange a marriage between her son Albert and a member of the British royal house, plans which eventually led to a marriage between Albert and Lady Mary Douglas-Hamilton.

From 1856 until her death in 1864, she was the Princess consort of Monaco. During the reign of her spouse, she reportedly worked hard to support her husband, who progressed further in to blindness, and her aging mother-in-law, who also supported her son as his political adviser. In 1862, Antoinette was diagnosed with cancer, and was advised by the doctors not to leave her home. Antoinette died on 10 February 1864 in Paris, aged 35, and was interred in the Cathedral of Our Lady Immaculate in Monaco.

Monegasque royalty
Preceded by Maria Caroline Gibert de Lametz	Princess consort of Monaco; 1856–1864	Vacant Title next held by Alice Heine
