= Oscar Grimaldi =

French politician (1814–1894)

Sub-prefect of Chalon-sur-Saône
- In office 24 October 1861 – 16 March 1870

Sub-prefect of Castres
- In office 12 August 1856 – 24 October 1861
- Preceded by: Étienne Henri Garnier
- Succeeded by: Achille de Vallavieille

Sub-prefect of Lille
- In office 1853–1856

Sub-prefect of Aix-en-Provence

Personal details
- Born: Louis Gabriel Oscar Grimaldi; June 8, 1814 Paris, France
- Died: July 14, 1894 (aged 80) Saint-Germain-en-Laye, France
- Resting place: Château de Fontaine-Française
- Parents: Honoré V, Prince of Monaco (father); Félicité de Gamaches (mother)
- Occupation: Politician
- Awards: Officer of the Legion of Honour, 1864

Louis Gabriel Oscar Grimaldi, Marquis of Baux, (June 8, 1814 – July 14, 1894) was the illegitimate son of Prince Honoré V of Monaco and his mistress Félicité de Gamaches.

== Biography ==
Louis Gabriel Oscar Grimaldi was born to unknown parents in Paris, at 15 rue Bonaparte, in the former 10th arrondissement, on June 8, 1814.

A few months after his birth, on November 28, 1814, he was acknowledged by Prince Honoré V of Monaco before Alexandre Toussaint Delacour, a notary in Paris, with his legitimisation, Oscar was bestowed the Grimaldi surname, however, because he was born out of wedlock, meant that he would never succeed as Prince of Monaco. His maternal lineage remained officially undetermined until his death.

A law graduate and lawyer at the Paris Court of Appeal, he then pursued a career in the French administration: he was attached to the Ministry of the Interior, Litigation Division (1842), deputy head of the office in the Finance Division in Algeria (1846), and then to the Directorate of Civil Affairs in Algiers (1847–1848).

The remainder of his career was spent in the prefectoral administration, serving as sub-prefect of Lille (1853–1856), sub-prefect of Castres (1856–1861), sub-prefect of Chalon-sur-Saône (1861–1870), before retiring in 1870.

In 1860, his first cousin, Prince Charles III of Monaco, bestowed upon him the title of Marquis of Baux, a title not recognized in France.

The French state made him a Knight of the Legion of Honour on November 10, 1852, and he was promoted to Officer on August 11, 1864.

He died unmarried and without issue in Saint-Germain-en-Laye on July 14, 1894. He was buried at Château de Fontaine-Française.

== The question of his parentage addressed by the authors. ==
=== According to Albert Révérend ===
In the Titles, ennoblements and peerages of the Restoration (French: Titres, anoblissements et pairies de la Restauration), Viscount Albert Révérend mentions the existence of the natural son of Honoré V of Monaco, without giving any indication or hypothesis as to the maternal filiation of the latter.

=== According to Henry de Woelmont de Brumagne ===
In the fifth series of his Genealogical Notices , Woelmont mentions, without indicating his sources, that Félicité Madeleine Honorée Gabrielle Rouault de Gamaches (20 Apr 1781 – 13 Jul 1819), then wife of Jacques Philippe Achille Louis Auguste Barthélémy François, Count of Héricy (1775 – 1842), is the mother of the Marquis des Baux, natural son of the Duke of Valentinois (the future Honoré V).

=== According to Jean-Fred Tourtchine ===
Natural child born to Félicité Pronault de Gamaches.

=== According to Denis Grando ===
In his essay on Camille de La Vincelle, bastard of Honoré III Prince of Monaco , Denis Grando reproduces verbatim the documents relating to the civil status of Oscar Grimaldi, his birth, recognition and death certificates, his service records, without giving any indication or hypothesis as to his maternal filiation.

== Sources ==
- Révérend, Albert (1974). Titres, anoblissements et pairies de la Restauration, 1814-1830 Tome 3 (in French). H. Champion. p. 386.
- Tourtchine, Jean-Fred (April 2002). Le Royaume de Bavière volume III — La Principauté de Monaco (in French). CEDRE. p. 289. ISSN 0993-3964.
- Lamoussière, Christiane; Laharie, Patrick (1998). "Notice « Grimaldi (Charles, Louis, Gabriel, Oscar de) »". Le personnel de l’administration préfectorale, 1800-1880. List of names by Christiane Lamoussière, revised and supplemented by Patrick Laharie; territorial list and introduction by Patrick Laharie. Paris: Centre historique des Archives nationales. p. 366. ISBN 2-86000-271-5.
- Grando, Denis (2002). Camille de La Vincelle, bâtarde d'Honoré III prince de Monaco, femme d'archéologue de numismate et d'antiquaire, sa famille, sa descendance (in French). Versailles: Cercle généalogique de Versailles et des Yvelines. p. 190. ISBN 2-9519004-0-6.
