= Albert of Monaco =

Albert of Monaco may refer to:

- Albert I, Prince of Monaco (1848–1922), who reigned as Prince of Monaco from September 10, 1889, to June 26, 1922
- Albert II, Prince of Monaco (born 1958), son of Prince Rainier III, and the current reigning Prince of Monaco since April 6, 2005
