= Albert, Prince of Monaco =

Albert, Prince of Monaco may refer to

- Albert I, Prince of Monaco (1848–1922), Sovereign Prince of Monaco from 1889 to 1922
- Albert II, Prince of Monaco (born 1958), Sovereign Prince of Monaco since 2005
