= Marchais, Aisne =

Marchais
- Commune
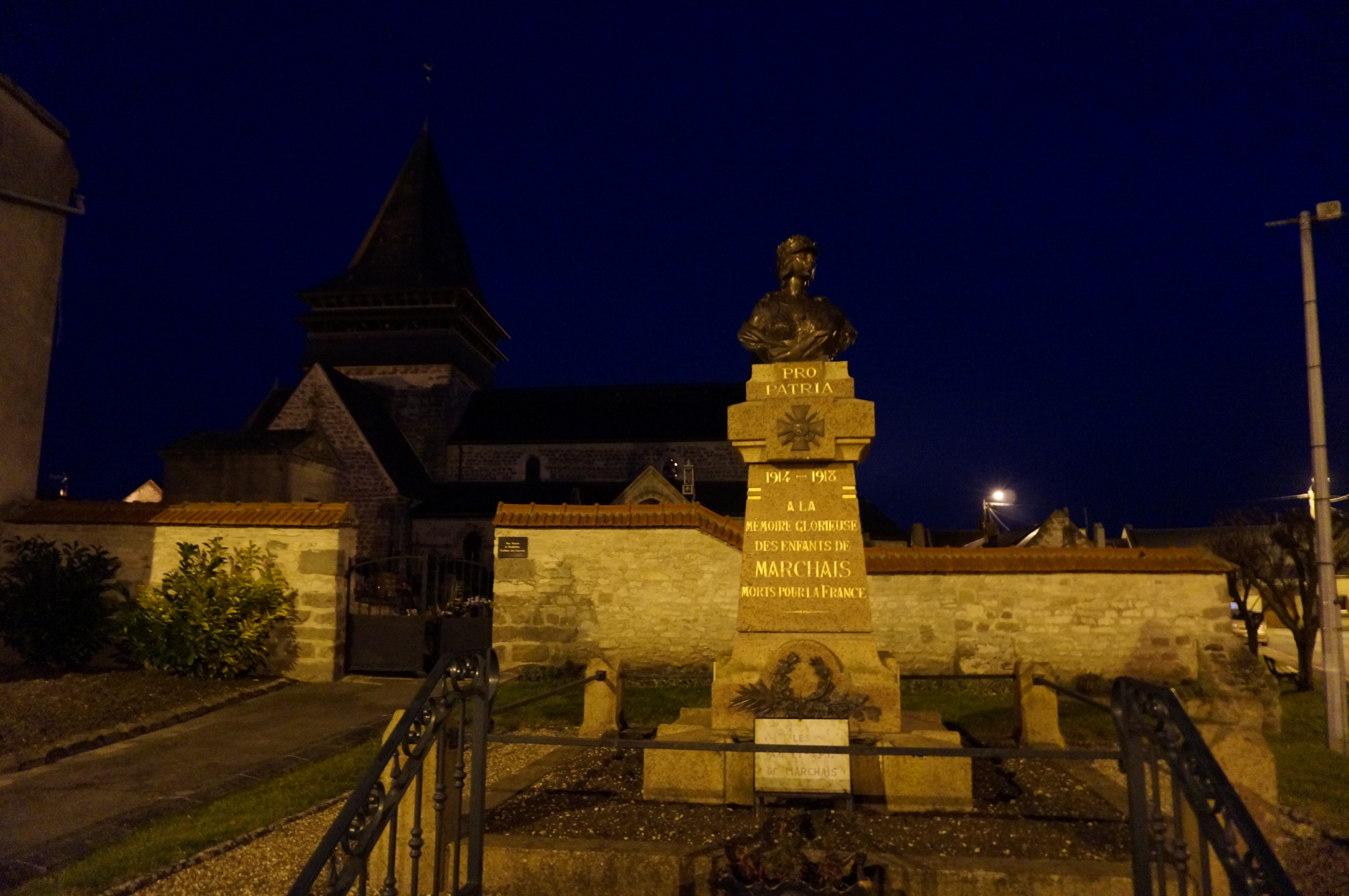
- The monument to the dead and church of Marchais
- Location of Marchais
- Location within France Location within Hauts-de-France
- Coordinates: 49°35′04″N 3°49′03″E
- Country: France
- Region: Hauts-de-France
- Department: Aisne
- Arrondissement: Laon
- Canton: Villeneuve-sur-Aisne
- Intercommunality: Champagne Picarde

Government
  - Mayor (2026–32): Christophe Hanon
- Area^{1}: 15.3 km^{2} (5.9 sq mi)
- Elevation: 80 m (260 ft)
- Highest elevation: 110 m (360 ft)
- Lowest elevation: 70 m (230 ft)
- Population (2023): 389
  - Density: 25.4/km^{2} (65.9/sq mi)
- Demonym: Marchaisiens
- Time zone: UTC+01:00 (CET)
  - Summer (DST): UTC+02:00 (CEST)
- INSEE/Postal code: 02457 /02350
- ^{1} French Land Register data, which excludes lakes, ponds, glaciers > 1 km^{2} (0.386 sq mi or 247 acres) and river estuaries.

Marchais (French pronunciation: [maʁʃɛ]) is a commune in the Aisne department in Hauts-de-France in northern France. It takes its name from the Latin 'mercasius' or marshland.

The 16th century Château de Marchais is a private residence of the Princes of Monaco, since being acquired in 1854 by Charles III. It was built in the 16th century by Nicolas de Longueval, Comte de Bossut. He was accused of treason, though, and to save his life, he surrendered his castle and lands to Charles, Cardinal of Lorraine.

In 1906, Maurice Léger made a prototype helicopter flight at Marchais.

== Population ==
Historical population
| Year | Pop. | ±% p.a. |
|---|---|---|
| 1968 | 392 | — |
| 1975 | 343 | −1.89% |
| 1982 | 384 | +1.63% |
| 1990 | 364 | −0.67% |
| 1999 | 381 | +0.51% |
| 2007 | 354 | −0.91% |
| 2012 | 378 | +1.32% |
| 2017 | 435 | +2.85% |
| 2023 | 389 | −1.85% |
Source: INSEE

== See also ==
- Communes of the Aisne department
