= Achille Joseph Delamare =

French military officer and politician

Achille Joseph Delamare (11 February, 1790– 8 March, 1873) was a French military officer and politician. He served as a member of the French Senate from 1852 to 1870. He was the owner of the Château de Marchais from 1836 to 1854. He served as the president of the Jockey-Club de Paris from 1849 to 1853.
