= Princess Alice Bank =

Seamount to the southwest of Pico and Faial in the Azores

Coordinates: 37°55′N 31°30′W

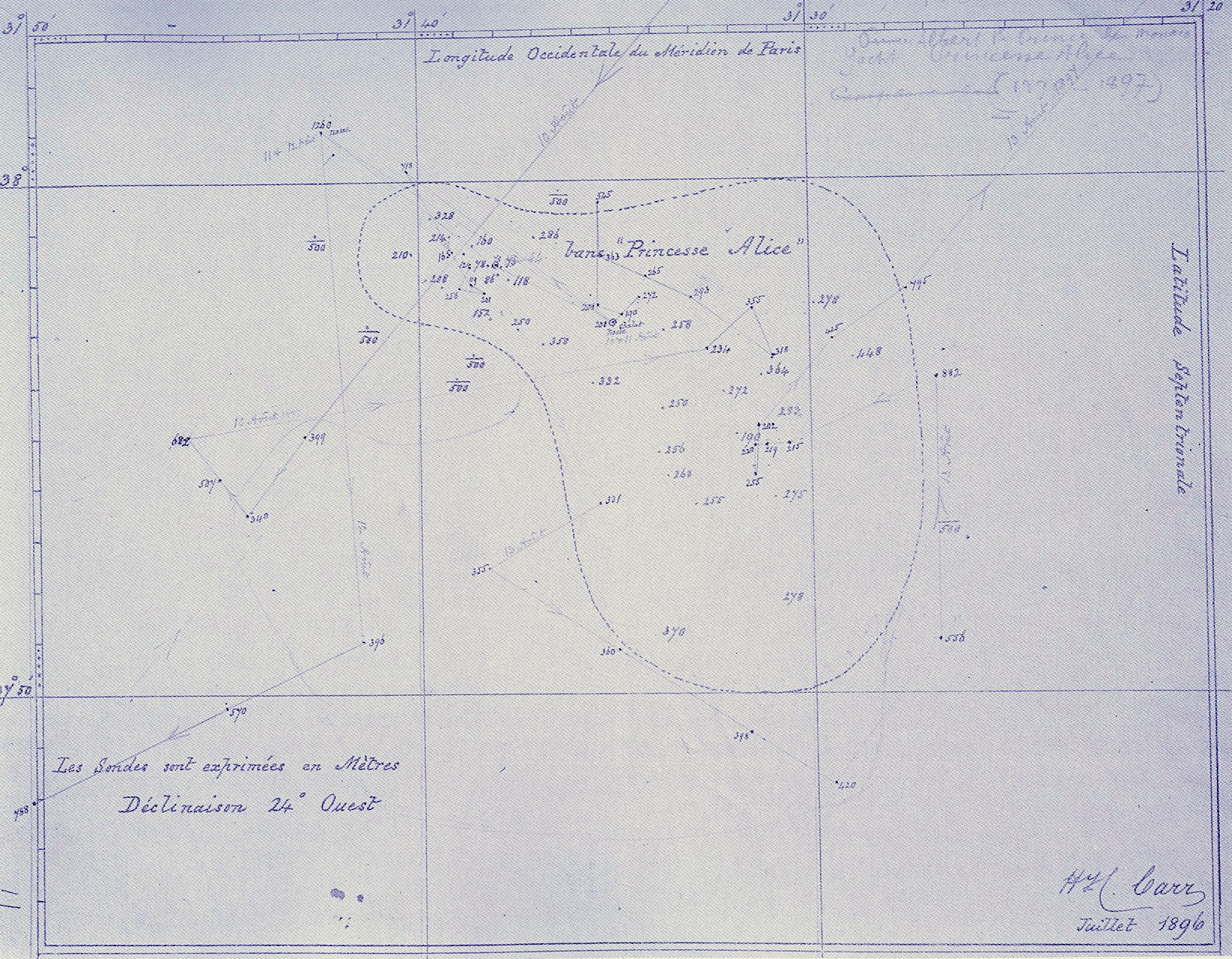
Map of the Princesse Alice Bank made in July 1896 by the research vessel Princesse Alice, from Monaco

The Princess Alice Bank (Portuguese: Banco Princesa Alice) is a submerged seamount located 50 nmi (93 km) southwest of the island of Pico and 45 nmi (83 km) southwest of the island of Faial in the Portuguese archipelago of the Azores. The western area of the bank has a least depth of 29 metres (95 ft), with clear waters allowing observation of the ocean floor from the surface. With an abundance of biodiversity, the bank is a fishing area, in addition to being an important diving spot of the Atlantic Ocean.

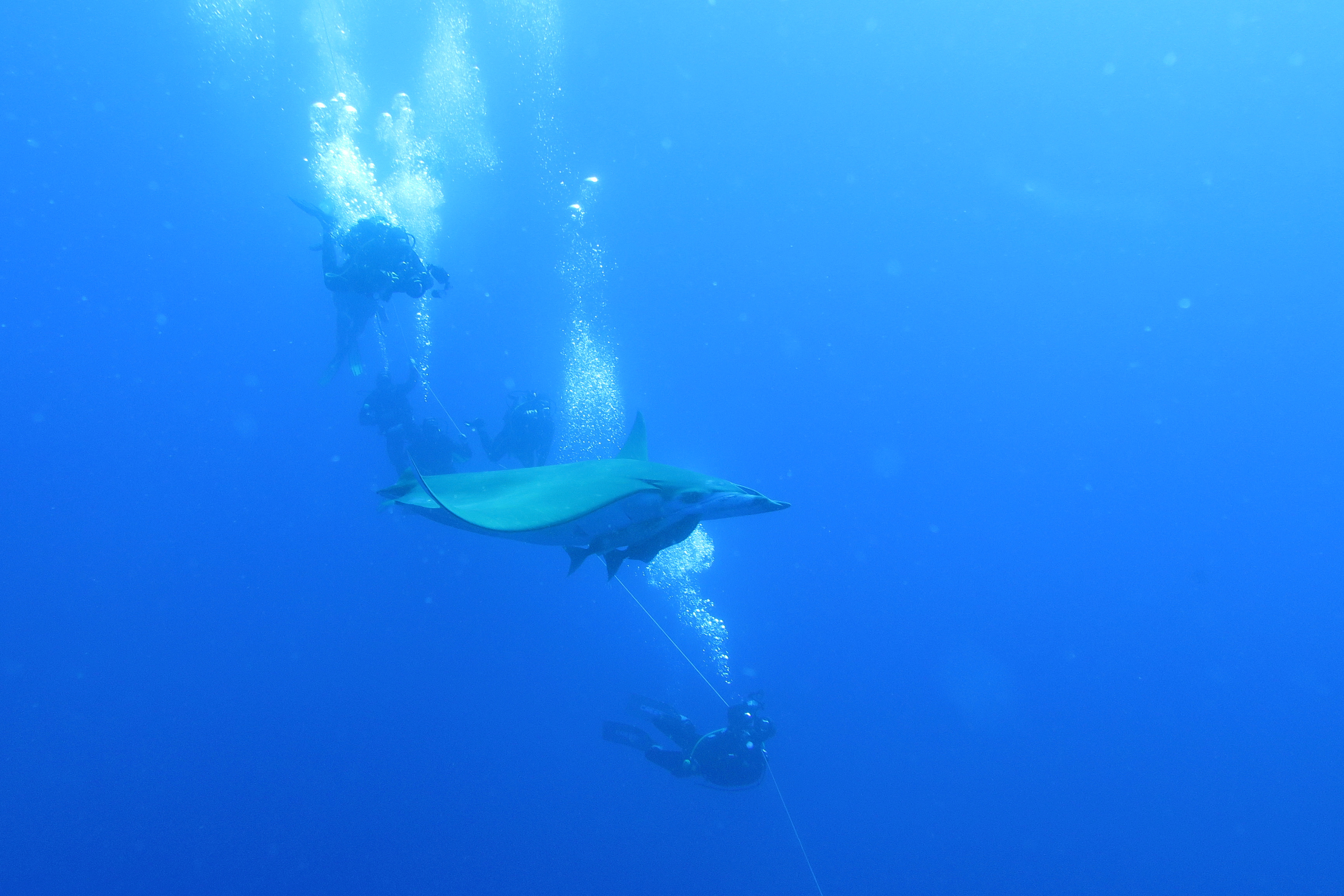
Diving on the peak of Princess Alice Bank. Divers stand at anchor with the boat on the peak.

== History ==
The bank was named after the oceanographic campaign of Prince Albert I of Monaco, whose research vessel Princess Alice was involved in its discovery on 9 July 1896. On that day, at 6:00 a.m., at the beginning of a deep water exploration, rocky ledges were discovered 241 metres (791 ft) deep. After scouring the area, the group discovered an extensive "platform", with a perimeter of about 55 km (34 mi), and two extensions of 76 metres (249 ft) in length. The platform was 190 metres (620 ft) below the surface, although the peak is only 29 metres (95 ft) from the surface.

The bathymetric survey was entrusted to captain Charlwood Henry Carr^{d} (1848-1918), who was also the prince's field assistant and navigator of the Princesse Alice. Carr was responsible for the original depth measurements at Princess Alice Bank.

On 13 July 1896, from Faial, Prince Albert telegrammed King Carlos I of Portugal announcing the discovery and informing him of the usefulness of the bank for fishing. Returning to Monaco, on 21 August, the prince circulated a press statement reporting the discovery and stressing its importance to Azorean fisheries. In gratitude for the discovery, King Carlos awarded the prince with the "grand collar" of the Order of Santiago, having already granted Captain Carr the honorific degree of master of the Order of St. Benedict in 1894. Increasingly Princess Alice Bank has become one of the main areas for fishing exploration within the Central Group of the Azorean islands.

== Geography ==
An area of 50 nautical miles (93 km) around the bank, measured from the coasts of the closest islands, was established by the European Union as a reserve for Azorean fishermen. Princess Alice Bank is one of the main points of friction, or disagreement, in the current dispute between the Regional Government of the Azores and the European Union regarding the reform of the common fisheries policy.
