= Charles III of Monaco =

Prince of Monaco from 1856 to 1889

Charles III
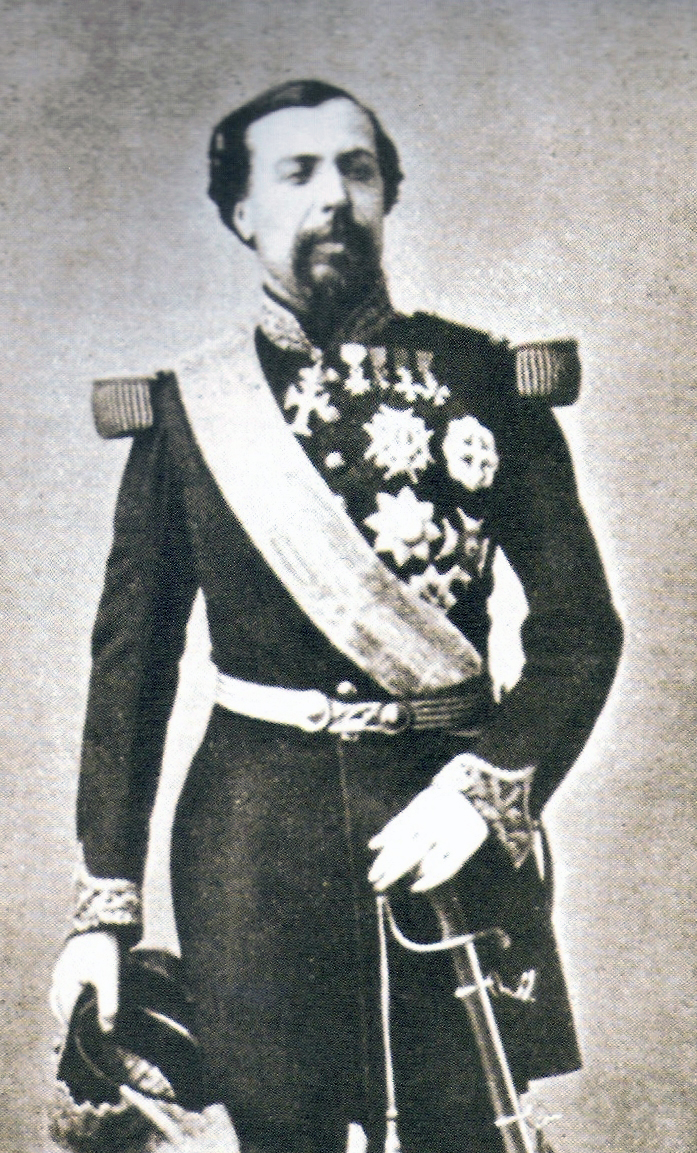

Prince of Monaco
- Reign: 20 June 1856 – 10 September 1889
- Predecessor: Florestan
- Successor: Albert I
- Born: 8 December 1818; Paris, France
- Died: 10 September 1889 (aged 70); Château de Marchais, France
- Burial: Saint Nicholas Cathedral, Monaco
- Spouse: Antoinette de Mérode (m. 1846; died 1864)
- Issue: Albert I, Prince of Monaco
Names
- Charles Honoré Grimaldi
- House: Grimaldi
- Father: Florestan, Prince of Monaco
- Mother: Caroline Gibert de Lametz

Charles III (Charles Honoré Grimaldi; 8 December 1818 – 10 September 1889) was Prince of Monaco and Duke of Valentinois from 20 June 1856 to his death. He was the founder of the famous casino in Monte Carlo, as his name in Monegasque and Italian was Carlo III. He was born in Paris, the only son of Florestan, Prince of Monaco, and Caroline Gibert de Lametz.

== Marriage and reign ==
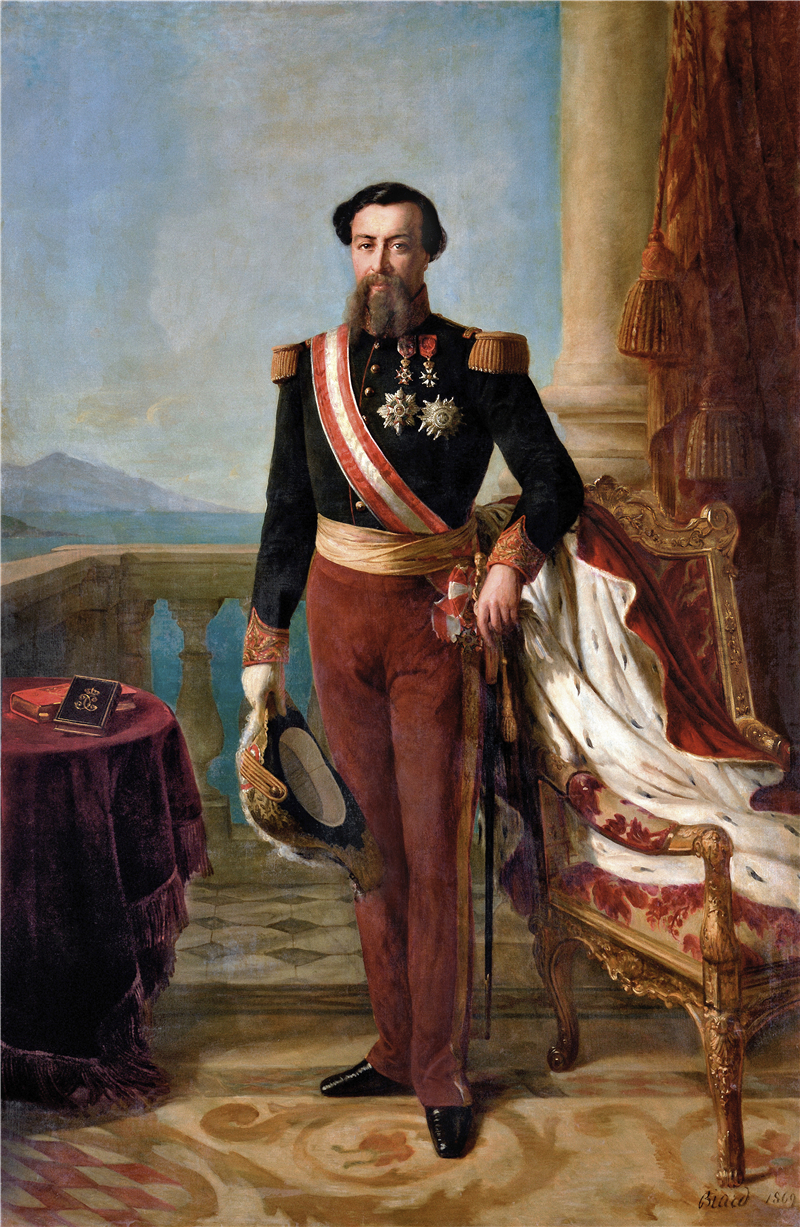
Portrait of Charles III by François-Auguste Biard

While he was Hereditary Prince, Charles was married on 28 September 1846 in Brussels to Countess Antoinette de Mérode-Westerloo.

He succeeded his father Prince Florestan in 1856.

During his reign, the towns of Menton and Roquebrune, constituting some 80 percent of Monegasque territory, were formally ceded to France, paving the way for formal French recognition of Monaco's independence. Rebellions in these towns, aided by the Kingdom of Sardinia, had exhausted Monaco's military resources for decades.

The Principality was in dire need of cash flow, so Prince Charles and his mother, Princess Caroline, had the idea of erecting a casino. The Monte Carlo Casino was designed, according to the Prince's liking, in the German style and placed at the site of Les Spélugues. Monte Carlo (in English, Mount Charles) itself takes its name from Charles, after all its founder. Charles established a society (business) to run the Casino; this society is today the Société des bains de mer de Monaco.

Under Charles III, the Principality of Monaco increased its diplomatic activities; for example, in 1864, Charles III concluded a Treaty of Friendship with the Bey of Tunis, Muhammad III as-Sadiq, which also regulated trade and maritime issues.

== Honours ==
Monte Carlo is named after Charles III. It stands for the "Mount Charles" in Italian.

The Order of Saint-Charles was instituted on 15 March 1858, during the reign of Prince Charles III.

He received the following decorations and awards:

- Grand Cross of the Royal Norwegian Order of St. Olav, with Collar, 27 March 1863 (Sweden-Norway)
- Grand Cross of the Order of the Dannebrog, in Brilliants, 16 February 1865 (Denmark)
- Grand Cross of the Grand Ducal Hessian Order of Ludwig, 17 April 1865 (Grand Duchy of Hesse)
- Grand Cross of the Royal and Distinguished Order of Charles III, 17 February 1867 (Spain)
- Grand Cross of the Order of the Red Eagle, 7 July 1869 (Kingdom of Prussia)
- Grand Cross of the Order of the Zähringer Lion, 1869 (Grand Duchy of Baden)
- Officer of the Legion d'Honneur, for his service in the French Navy in the Franco-Prussian War (French Empire)
- Grand Cordon of the Order of Leopold (civil division), 30 August 1874 (Belgium)
- Grand Cross of the Royal Hungarian Order of St. Stephen, 1882 (Austria-Hungary)
- Grand Cross of the Royal Order of the White Eagle (civil division), 29 May 1883 (Kingdom of Serbia)
- Knight of the Supreme Order of Christ (Holy See)
- Grand Cross of the Royal Military Order of the Tower and Sword (Kingdom of Portugal)

== Death ==
In his middle years his sight greatly weakened, and by the last decade of his life he had become almost totally blind. In fact, Dr. Thomas Henry Pickering wrote in 1882: "So far back as 1860, Prince Charles lost his eyesight".

He died at Château de Marchais on 10 September 1889. He was succeeded by his son Albert I of Monaco.

== Coin ==
Royal Monogram of Prince Charles III of Monaco

In 1966 Monaco released a 10 Francs silver coin in the memory of the 100th anniversary of Monte Carlo, portraying Prince Charles' III on its obverse. On 1 June 2016, fifteen thousand 2 euro coins were issued by Monaco; commemorating the 150th anniversary of the foundation of Monte Carlo by Charles III

== In literature ==
Charles III is referenced, as Prince Charles Honoré, in a fictional entitled, The Fall of Prince Florestan of Monaco, by the British politician Sir Charles Wentworth Dilke. This work was one of satire and parody on a number of political characters of the day. It centered around a Cambridge-educated, half-Württemberg nephew of Charles III who comes to the throne by way of Charles III and the next two heirs being wiped out of existence. The upstart "Florestan II", a radical republican, boldly attempts to democratize Monaco. He fails and then is forced to leave the country.

== Ancestry ==
Ancestors of Charles III of Monaco

16. Jacques I, Prince of Monaco
8. Honoré III, Prince of Monaco
17. Louise Hippolyte, Princess of Monaco
4. Honoré IV, Prince of Monaco
18. Giuseppe Brignole Sale, 7th Marquis of Groppoli
9. Maria Caterina Brignole Sale
19. Maria Anna Balbi
2. Florestan I, Prince of Monaco
20. Louis Marie d'Aumont, 5th Duke of Aumont
10. Louis Marie d'Aumont, 6th Duke of Aumont
21. Victoire Félicité de Durfort
5. Louise Félicité d'Aumont, Duchess Mazarin
22. Emmanuel Félicité de Durfort, 4th Duke of Duras
11. Louise Jeanne de Durfort, Duchess Mazarin
23. Charlotte-Antoinette de La Porte Mazarin
1.Charles III, Prince of Monaco
24. Simon Gibert
12. Thomas Gibert
25. Marie Louise Prévost
6. Charles-Thomas Gibert de Lametz
26. Noël Augustin Moret
13. Françoise Moret
27. Madeleine Thérèse Galleran
3. Maria Caroline Gibert de Lametz
28. François Edouard Michel Le Gras de Vaubercey
14. François Louis Michel Le Gras de Vaubercey
29. Louise de Lormeaux
7. Marie Françoise Le Gras de Vaubercey
30. Jean Baptiste François des Courtils, Lord of Bessy-Montbertoin
15. Gabrielle Françoise des Courtils
31. Marie Marguerite de Lafons d'Hardecourt

Charles III of Monaco House of Grimaldi Cadet branch of the House of Matignon Born: 8 December 1818 Died: 10 September 1889
Regnal titles
Preceded by Florestan	Prince of Monaco; 1856–1889	Succeeded by Albert I
Monegasque royalty
Preceded by Florestan	Hereditary Prince of Monaco; 1841–1856	Succeeded by Albert I
Preceded by Florestan	Marquis of Baux; 1841–1856	Succeeded by Albert I
Titles of nobility
Preceded by Florestan	Duke of Valentinois; 1856–1889	Succeeded by Albert I
