= Florestan, Prince of Monaco =

Prince of Monaco from 1841 to 1856

Florestan
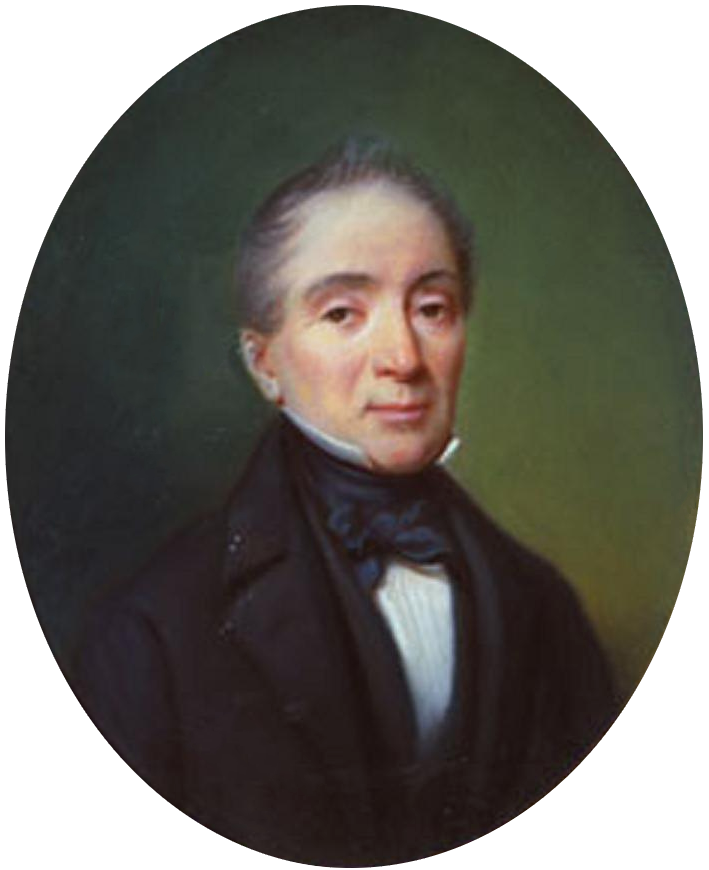

Prince of Monaco
- Reign: 2 October 1841 – 20 June 1856
- Predecessor: Honoré V
- Successor: Charles III
- Born: 10 October 1785; Paris, France
- Died: 20 June 1856 (aged 70); Paris, France
- Burial: Saint Nicholas Cathedral
- Spouse: Maria Caroline Gibert de Lametz (m. 1816)
- Issue: Charles III, Prince of Monaco; Florestine, Duchess of Urach
Names
- Tancrède Florestan Roger Louis Grimaldi
- House: Grimaldi
- Father: Honoré IV, Prince of Monaco
- Mother: Louise d'Aumont

Florestan (Tancrède Florestan Roger Louis Grimaldi; 10 October 1785 in Paris – 20 June 1856) was Prince of Monaco and Duke of Valentinois from 2 October 1841 until his death in 1856. He was the second son of Prince Honoré IV and Louise d'Aumont Mazarin and succeeded to the throne on the death of his brother, Honoré V.

== Early life, education, and military career ==
Brought up by his mother, he showed an early and strong aptitude for literature. At the age of eleven, he enrolled in the School of Fontainebleau, but did not stay there long. He entered the military, where he had many struggles and barely achieved the rank of Corporal. He was taken prisoner during the French invasion of Russia. He was not freed to return to France until 1814.

== Marriage and children ==
Prince Florestan, age 29, married Maria Caroline Gibert de Lametz in Commercy on 27 November 1816. Apparently, his family disapproved of the union, so they had to marry "quietly and modestly." Florestan received only a small income from his family, so, as it turned out, his marriage to an upper-bourgeois family member of the province of Champagne was, in fact, "financially favorable."

The marriage produced the following:

- Charles III, Prince of Monaco (8 December 1818 – 10 September 1889)
- Princess Florestine of Monaco (22 October 1833 – 4 April 1897)

== Reign ==
Royal Monogram of Prince Florestan I of Monaco

Florestan was ill-prepared to assume the role of Sovereign Prince. Indeed, the British historian H. Pemberton wrote that, upon accession to the throne, Florestan was "a man utterly unsuited for the task before him." He had been an actor in the Théâtre de l'Ambigu-Comique. The real power during his reign lay in the hands of his wife, Princess Caroline, who possessed great intelligence and "excelled at social skills." According to the historian Gustave Saige, Princess Caroline's intelligence was required to figure out the affairs of state, which Honoré V had handled absolutely by himself, not trusting anyone to advise or assist him. For some time, she was able, by tax reform, to alleviate the difficult economic situation stemming from the Congress of Vienna assigning Monaco as a protectorate of the Kingdom of Sardinia rather than France. At the time Monaco was surrounded by the Sardinian controlled County of Nice.

As unprepared as Florestan was for the affairs of the Principality, his ascendance to power upon the death of his brother was largely welcomed by the populace. "He was given a particularly warm reception by the people of Menton," wrote Saige in French. Saige attributed the cause for this to the relief widely felt at having a prince who was not invisible to the public; unlike Honoré V, Florestan went out in public. He even established a school in Menton, albeit an expensive one from which the princely couple attempted to meet local demands for democratic reforms and offered two constitutions to the local population, but these were rejected, particularly by the people of Menton, who were offered something better by King Charles Albert of Sardinia. When the Prince and Princess of Monaco saw that their efforts were doomed to failure, they handed over power to their son Charles (later Prince Charles III). This was, however, too little, too late. Encouraged by the French Revolution of 1848, the towns of Menton and Roquebrune revolted and declared themselves independent free cities. Worse, the King of Sardinia garrisoned Menton, Florestan was dethroned, arrested, and imprisoned. Florestan was restored to the throne in 1849, but Menton and Roquebrune were lost forever.

== Death and succession, 1856 ==
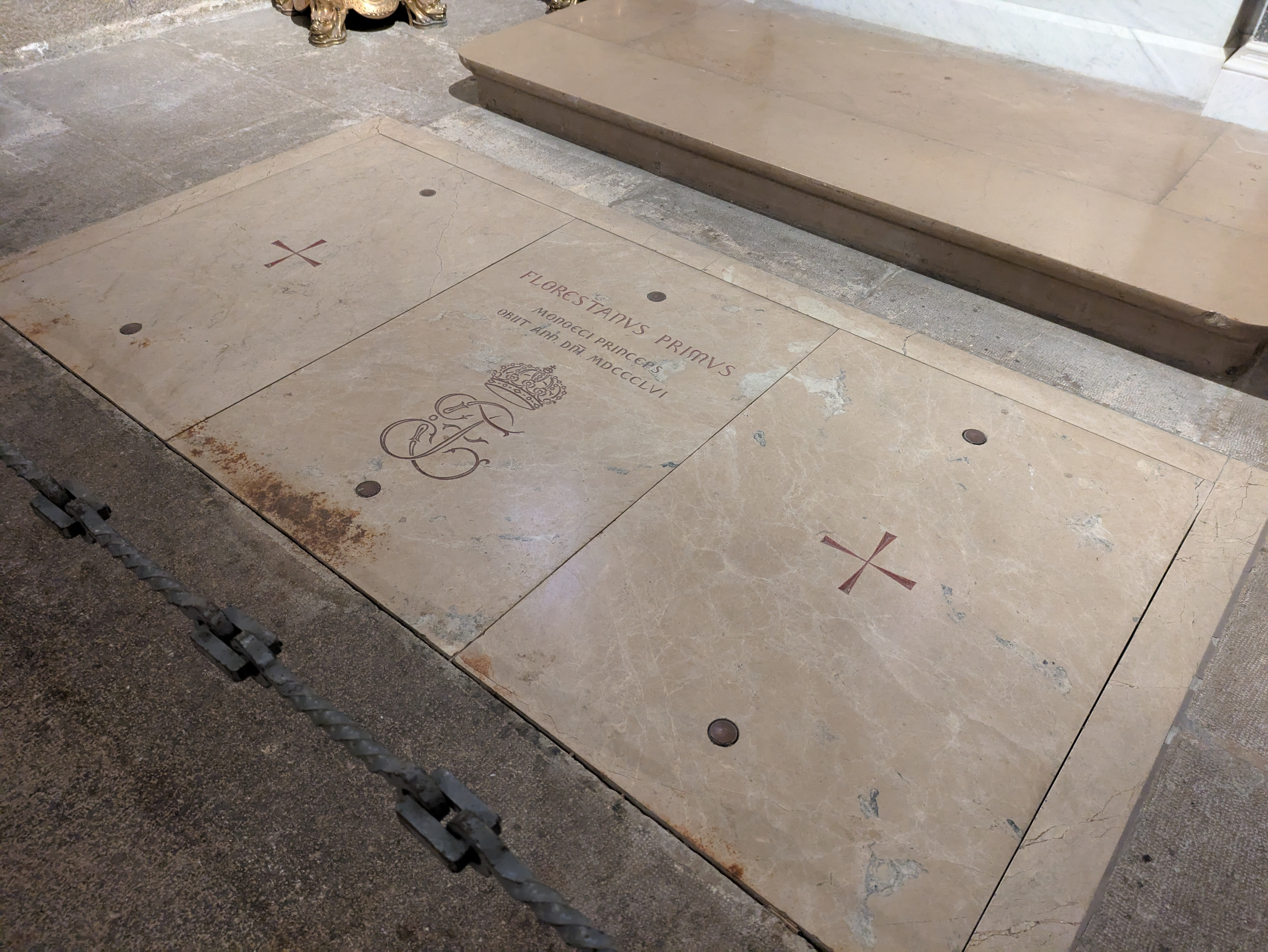
Tomb in the Cathedral of Monaco

Despite his good intentions, by the time of Florestan's death in Paris in 1856, Monaco was a country divided with few prospects for financial prosperity. His son Charles succeeded him.

== Ancestry ==
Ancestors of Florestan, Prince of Monaco

16. Jacques III de Goyon, Count of Matignon
8. Jacques Goyon, Count of Matignon, Prince of Monaco
17. Charlotte de Goyon, Countess of Thorigny
4. Honoré III Grimaldi, Prince of Monaco
18. Antonio Grimaldi, Prince of Monaco
9. Louise Hippolyte Grimaldi, Princess of Monaco
19. Marie of Lorraine
2. Honoré IV, Prince of Monaco
20. Anton Giulio Brignole, (5th) Marquis of Groppoli
10. Giuseppe Brignole, (7th) Marquis of Groppoli
21. Isabella Brignole
5. Maria Caterina Brignole
22. Francesco Maria Balbi, Doge of Genoa
11. Maria Anna Balbi
23. Maria Clarice Durazzo
1. Florestan I, Prince of Monaco
24. Louis Marie d'Aumont, (4th) Duke of Aumont
12. Louis Marie d'Aumont, (5th) Duke of Aumont
25. Catherine de Guiscard
6. Louis Marie d'Aumont, (6th) Duke of Aumont
26. Jean Baptiste de Durfort, 3rd Duke of Duras
13. Victoire Félicité de Durfort
27. Marie Angélique of Bournonville
3. Louise d'Aumont, Duchess Mazarin
28. Jean Baptiste de Durfort, 3rd Duke of Duras (= 26)
14. Emmanuel Félicité de Durfort, 4th Duke of Duras
29. Marie Angélique de Bournonville (= 27)
7. Louise Jeanne de Durfort, Duchess Mazarin
30. Guy Jules de La Porte, Duke Mazarin
15. Charlotte Antoinette de La Porte
31. Louise Françoise de Rohan

Florestan, Prince of Monaco House of Grimaldi Born: 10 October 1785 Died: 20 June 1856
Regnal titles
Preceded by Honoré V	Prince of Monaco; 1841–1856	Succeeded by Charles III
Monegasque royalty
Preceded by Honoré V	Hereditary Prince of Monaco; 1819–1841	Succeeded by Charles III
Preceded by Honoré V	Marquis of Baux; 1819–1841	Succeeded by Charles III
Titles of nobility
Preceded by Honoré V	Duke of Valentinois; 1841–1856	Succeeded by Charles III
