= Caroline Gibert de Lametz =

Princess of Monaco from 1841 to 1856

Maria Caroline Gibert de Lametz
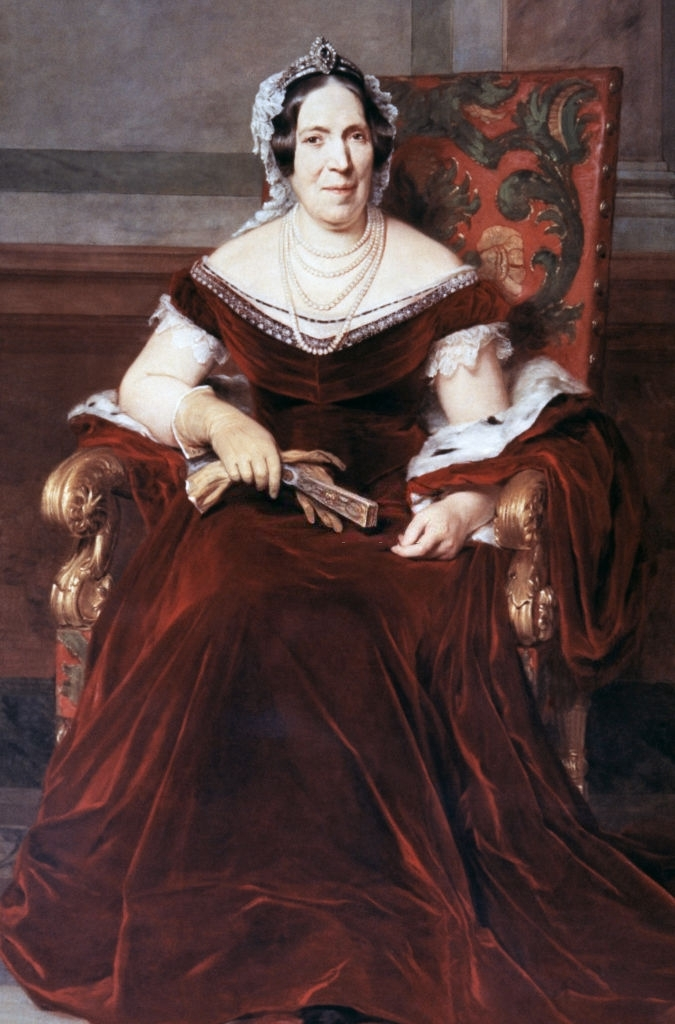

Princess consort of Monaco
- Tenure: 2 October 1841 – 20 June 1856
- Born: 18 July 1793; Coulommiers, France
- Died: 25 November 1879 (aged 86); Monaco
- Spouse: Florestan I, Prince of Monaco (m. 1816; died 1856)
- Issue: Charles III, Prince of Monaco; Florestine, Duchess of Urach
- House: Grimaldi (by marriage)
- Father: Charles-Thomas Gibert
- Mother: Marie-Françoise Le Gras de Vaubercey

Marie Caroline Gibert de Lametz (18 July 1793 – 25 November 1879) was a French stage actress and a princess consort and regent (de facto) of Monaco by marriage to Florestan I, Prince of Monaco.

== Life ==
She was the daughter of Charles-Thomas Gibert, who was a lawyer, and Marie-Françoise Le Gras de Vaubercey. The marriage of her parents ended in divorce, and she became the adopted stepdaughter of Antoine Rouyer de Lametz, Chevalier de l'Empire and Knight of the Legion of Honour.

Marie Caroline was a stage actress, as was her future spouse, Florestan. Maria Caroline Gibert de Lametz and Prince Florestan of Monaco, at that time both actors, married in Commercy on 27 November 1816 and had two children: Prince Charles III, and Princess Florestine.

She was described as a skilful businesswoman: she handled the economy of the family, and successfully managed the fortune her spouse inherited from his mother (who had excluded her eldest son from her will because of his illegitimate issue) in 1826.

=== Princess of Monaco ===
Florestan ascended to the throne in Monaco in 1841, but he was never prepared to assume the role of prince — he had been an actor in the Théâtre de l'Ambigu-Comique — and the real power during his reign lay in the hands of his wife, who reportedly possessed great intelligence and "excelled at social skills."

According to the historian Gustave Saige, Princess Caroline's intelligence was required to figure out the affairs of state, which Honoré V had handled absolutely by himself, not trusting anyone to advise or assist him. By introducing a tax reform, she was able to alleviate the difficult economic situation stemming from the Congress of Vienna assigning Monaco as a protectorate of the Kingdom of Sardinia rather than France. Her involvement in state politics, however, gave bad publicity to Florestan. When their son once reproached her for her de facto regent position, she replied that she ruled simply because she wanted to take responsibility for the welfare of the family.

The couple attempted to meet local demands for greater democracy and offered two constitutions to the local population, but these were rejected, particularly by the people of Menton, who were given a better offer by King Charles Albert of Sardinia. The Prince and Princess of Monaco then handed over power to their son Charles (later Prince Charles III). Encouraged by the Revolutions of 1848, however, the towns of Menton and Roquebrune revolted and declared themselves independent. The crisis worsened when the King of Sardinia garrisoned Menton, Florestan was dethroned, arrested, and imprisoned. Florestan was restored to the throne in 1849, but Menton and Roquebrune were lost forever. They had hoped to be annexed by Sardinia, but this did not occur, and the towns remained in a state of political limbo until they were finally ceded to France in 1861.

=== Later life ===
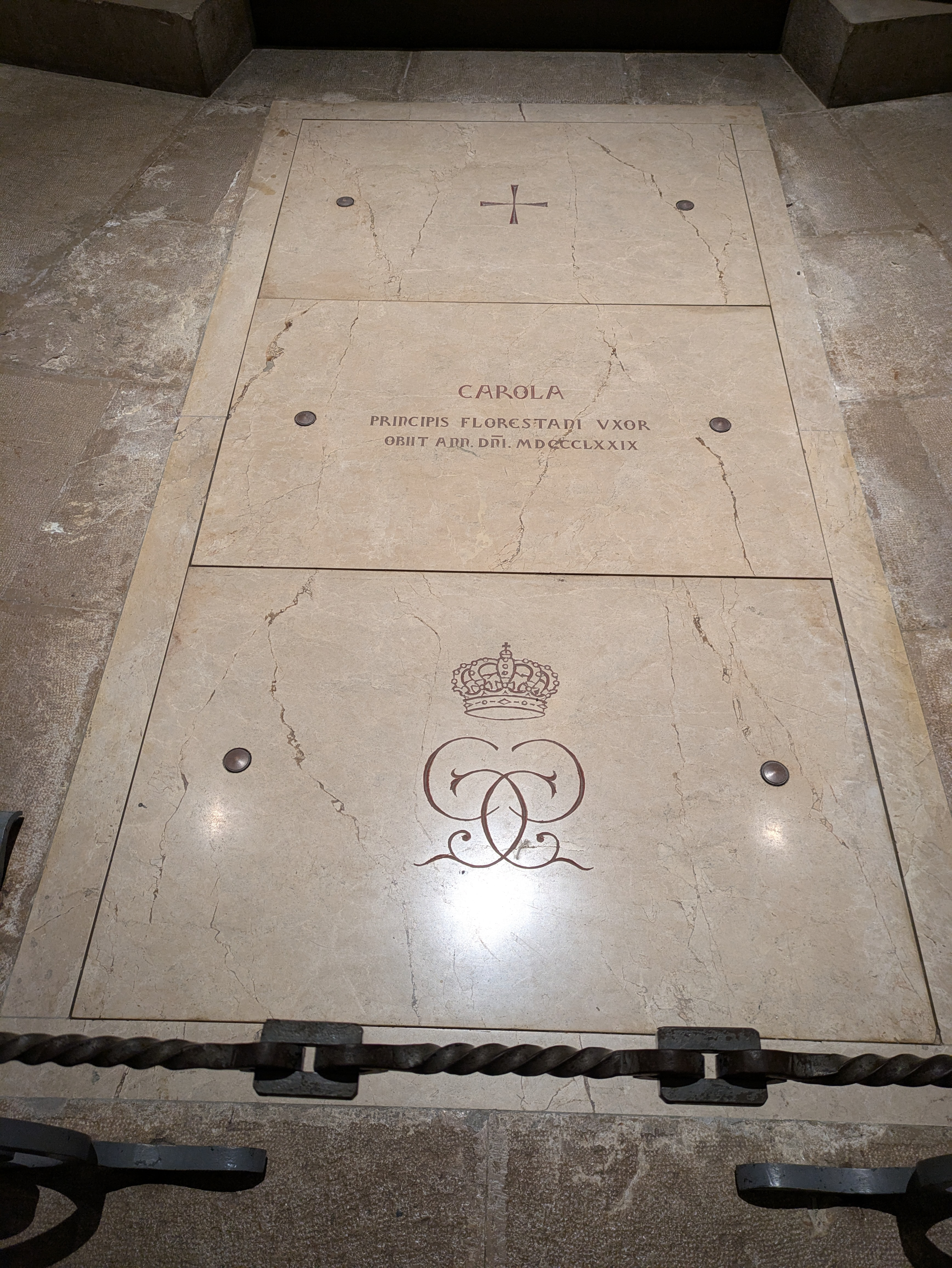
Tomb in the Cathedral of Monaco

After her husband's death in 1856, her son, Prince Charles III, took over control of the throne, having been well prepared to assume power by his mother. Together, they worked towards laying the foundation for Monaco as a major resort destination.

She died on 25 November 1879.

== Ancestry ==
Ancestors of Caroline Gibert de Lametz

16. Simon Gibert
8. Simon Gibert
17. Marthe Bourdin
4. Thomas Gibert
18. Louis Prévost
9. Marie Louise Prévost
19. Marie Louise Duchesne
2. Charles Thomas Gibert
20. Daniel Moret
10. Noël Augustin Moret
21. Catherine Besme
5. Françoise Moret
22. Claude Pierre Galleran
11. Madeleine Thérèse Galleran
23. Marie Marguerite Merle
1. Maria Caroline Gibert de Lametz
24. Antoine Le Gras, Lord of Vaubercey
12. François Edouard Michel Le Gras de Vaubercey
25. Marie Françoise de Bérulle
6. François Louis Michel Le Gras de Vaubercey
26. Jean Baptiste de Lormeau, Lord of Falourdet
13. Louise de Lormeau
27. Louise de Mertrus
3. Marie Françoise Le Gras de Vaubercey
28. Jean Baptiste des Courtils
14. Jean Baptiste François des Courtils, Lord of Bessy-Montbertoin
29. Louise Florimonde Bouzier d'Estouilly
7. Gabrielle Françoise des Courtils
30. Antoine de La Fons, Lord of Hardecourt
15. Marie Marguerite de La Fons d'Hardecourt
31. Anne Marguerite Bastonneau

=== Arms and emblems ===
| Coat of Arms of Maria Caroline as Princess of Monaco | Royal Monogram of Maria Caroline as Princess of Monaco |

Monegasque royalty
| Vacant Title last held by Maria Caterina Brignole | Princess consort of Monaco; 1841–1856 | Succeeded by Antoinette de Mérode |
