= Louise d'Aumont =

- Hereditary Princess of Monaco
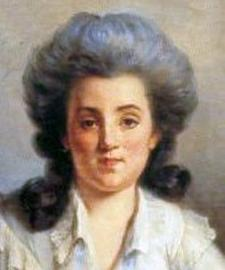
- Born: 22 October 1759; Hôtel d'Aumont, Paris, France
- Died: 13 December 1826 (aged 67); Paris, France
- Burial: Saint Nicholas Cathedral
- Spouse: Honoré, Hereditary Prince of Monaco (m. 1777; div. 1798) René François Tirnand-d'Arcis (m. 1801; div. 1803)
- Issue: Honoré V, Prince of Monaco; Florestan I, Prince of Monaco; Amélie Céleste Erodore d'Aumont; Jeanne Marie Pétronille d'Aumont
Names
- Louise Félicité Victoire d'Aumont
- House: Aumont
- Father: Louis Marie Guy d'Aumont
- Mother: Louise Jeanne de Durfort

Louise d'Aumont, duchesse d'Aumont, duchesse Mazarin et de La Meilleraye, (Louise Félicité Victoire; 22 October 1759, in Paris – 13 December 1826, in Paris) was a French Duchess and a Princess of Monaco by marriage to Honoré IV, Prince of Monaco.

== Life ==
Royal Monogram of Princess Louise d'Aumont of Monaco

She was the only child and daughter of Louis Marie Guy d'Aumont, Duke of Aumont (1732–1799), and Louise Jeanne de Durfort, duchesse Mazarin et de La Meilleraye (Paris, 1 September 1735 - Paris, 17 March 1781). Louise d'Aumont was a direct descendant of Hortense Mancini, the mistress of King Charles II of England, who was one of the two heirs of her uncle, King Louis XIV's chief minister Cardinal Mazarin. Also she was a descendant of Michel Le Tellier.

She married Honoré, Hereditary Prince of Monaco, on 15 July 1777 in Paris. The couple had two children, Prince Honoré V and Prince Florestan I. The marriage was arranged in order to give Monaco access to her great fortune. However, her family's assets were tied up in lawsuits, and Louise went into debt in Monaco because of her gambling and expensive wardrobe. The marriage between Louise and Honoré was unhappy, and they soon separated.

In March 1793, Monaco was annexed to Revolutionary France, and the members of the former ruling dynasty became French citizens. In parallel, her brother-in-law, Prince Joseph of Monaco spent most of his time abroad to negotiate foreign loans, making him and his family suspect of being contra-revolutionary traitors. Joseph's wife Marie Thérèse de Choiseul was arrested in the absence of her spouse, as was his father, his brother and his sister-in-law, Louise. Louise and her children where rescued from prison by her family doctor, Desormeaux, who forged a release order from prison and hid them until the fall of Maximilien Robespierre.

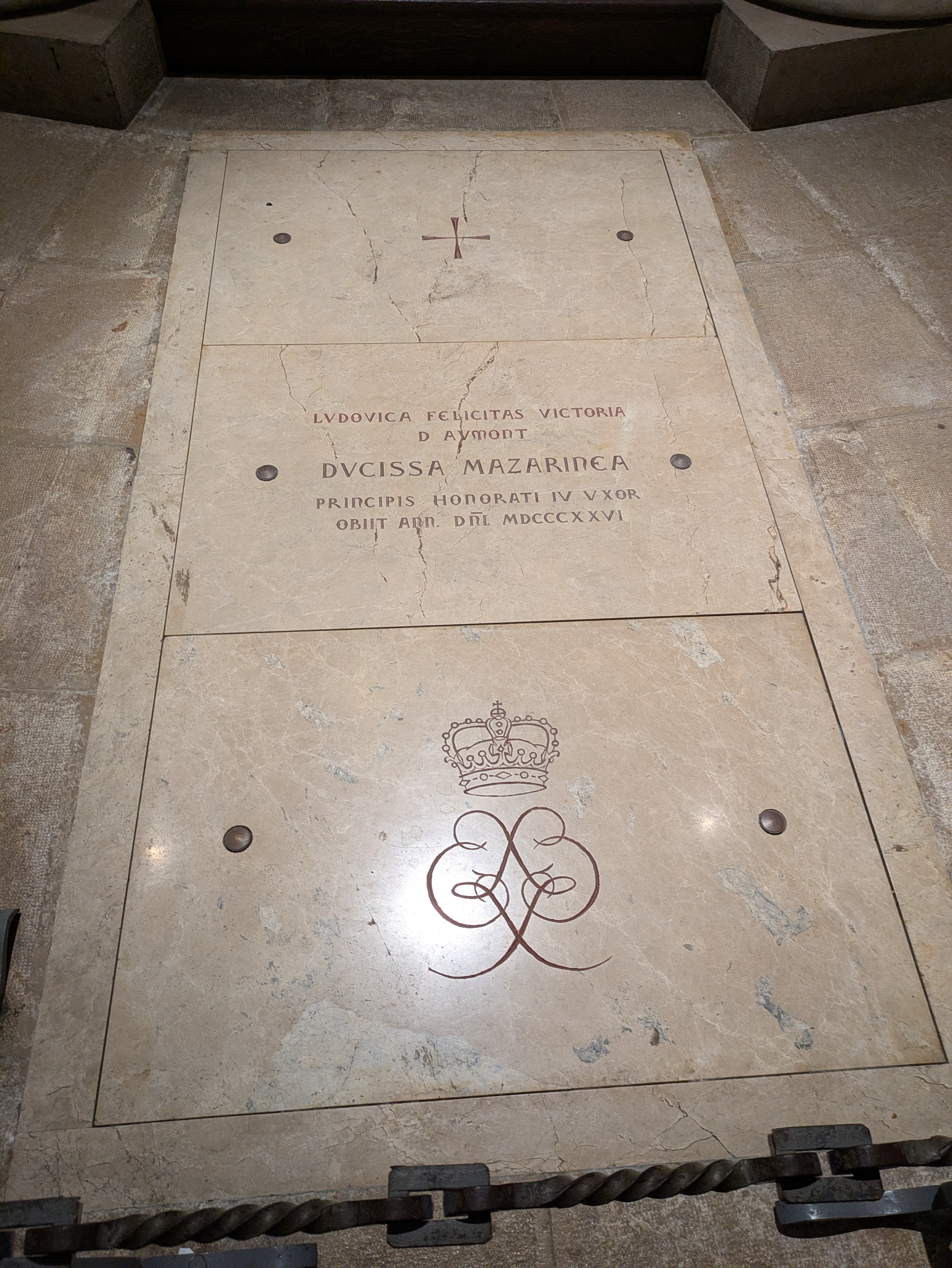
Tomb in the Cathedral of Monaco

On 28 March 1794, Louise gave birth to an illegitimate daughter, Amélie Céleste Erodore d'Aumont (died 1820). The father of the child is believed to have been Antoine de Montazet, archbishop of Lyon. The marriage of Honoré IV and Louise ended in divorce in 1798, giving Louise sole access of her fortune. Louise married secondly René François Tirand des Arcis on 6 February 1801, and divorced him in 1803.

Louise removed her eldest son from her will because he had an illegitimate child, and willed her entire fortune to her younger son, Florestan. Through their descent from Louise and her mother, the princely family of Monaco now lays claim to the wealth and estates bequeathed by Cardinal Mazarin, including the Duchy of Rethel, and the Principality of Château-Porcien.

== Ancestry ==
Ancestors of Louise d'Aumont

16. Louis d'Aumont, Duke of Aumont
8. Louis Marie d'Aumont, Duke of Aumont
17. Olympe de Brouilly, Marquise of Piennes
4. Louis Marie Victor Augustin d'Aumont, Duke of Aumont
18. Louis de Guiscard, Count of La Bourlie, Marquis of Guiscard-Magny
9. Catherine de Guiscard
19. Angelique de Langlée, Dame of Espichelière
2. Louis Marie d'Aumont, Duke of Aumont
20. Jacques Henri de Durfort, Duke of Duras
10. Jean Baptiste de Durfort, 3rd Duke of Duras
21. Marguerite Félice de Lévis
5. Victoire Félicité de Durfort
22. Alexandre Albert François Barthélemy de Bournonville, Duke and Prince of Bournonville
11. Marie Angèlique Victoire de Bournonville
23. Marie Charlotte Victoire d'Albert de Luynes
1. Louise d'Aumont Mazarin
24. Jacques Henri de Durfort, 1st Duke of Duras (= 20)
12. Jean Baptiste de Durfort, 3rd Duke of Duras (= 10)
25. Marguerite Félice de Lévis (= 21)
6. Emmanuel Félicité de Durfort, 4th Duke of Duras
26. Alexandre Albert François Barthélemy de Bournonville, Duke and Prince of Bournonville (= 22)
13. Marie Angèlique Victoire de Bournonville (= 11)
27. Marie Charlotte Victoire d'Albert de Luynes (= 23)
3. Louise Jeanne de Durfort, Duchess Mazarin and of La Meilleraye
28. Paul Jules de La Porte Mazarin, Duke Mazarin and of La Meilleraye
14. Guy Jules Paul de La Porte Mazarin, Duke Mazarin and of La Meilleraye
29. Felice Armande Charlotte de Durfort
7. Charlotte Antoinette de La Porte Mazarin
30. Hercule Mériadec de Rohan, Duke of Rohan-Rohan
15. Louise Françoise de Rohan
31. Anne Geneviève de Lévis
