= Honoré V of Monaco =

Prince of Monaco from 1819 to 1841

Honoré V
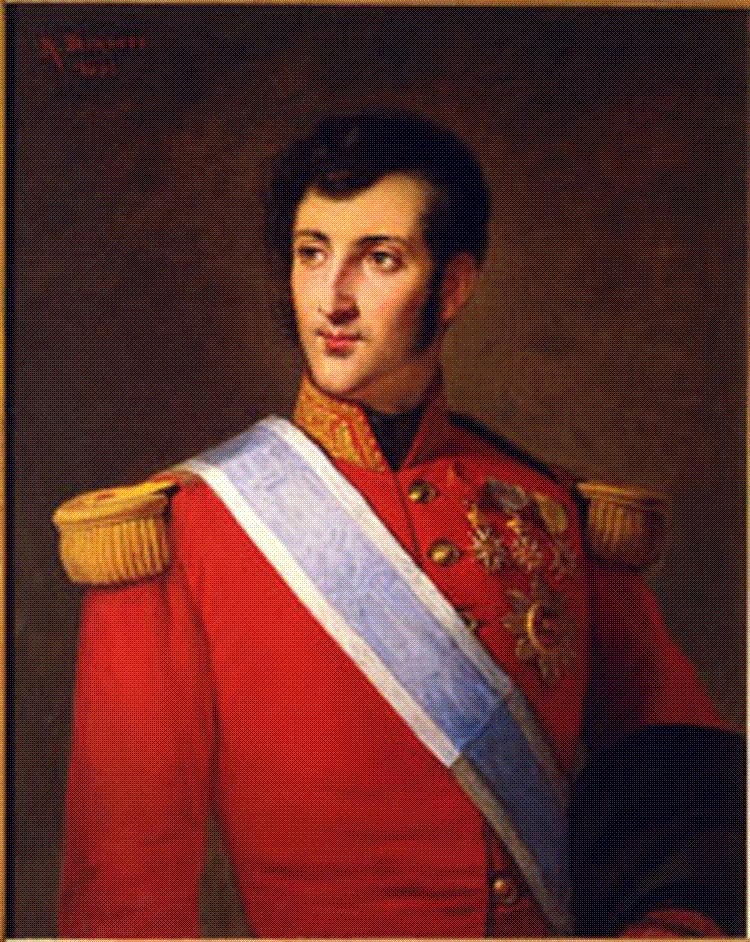
- Portrait, c. 1800

Prince of Monaco
- Reign: 16 February 1819 – 2 October 1841
- Predecessor: Honoré IV
- Successor: Florestan
- Born: 13 May 1778; Paris, France
- Died: 2 October 1841 (aged 63); Paris, France
- Burial: Saint Nicholas Cathedral
- Issue: Oscar Grimaldi
Names
- Honoré Gabriel Grimaldi
- House: Grimaldi
- Father: Honoré IV, Prince of Monaco
- Mother: Louise d'Aumont

Honoré V (Honoré Gabriel Grimaldi; 13/14 May 1778 – 2 October 1841) was Prince of Monaco and Duke of Valentinois. He was the first son of Honoré IV of Monaco and Louise d'Aumont.

== Regent ==
Illnesses resulting from his imprisonment incapacitated Honoré IV in his later years, and following the re-establishment of the Principality in 1814, a regency was established to rule in Honoré's name. This regency was directed, first, by his brother Joseph Grimaldi, then from 1815 by his son, the Hereditary Prince Honoré, who succeeded him in 1819 as Sovereign Prince Honoré V.

== Reign ==
A professor of the period, Victor de la Canorgue, wrote of Prince Honoré in negative terms: extravagant and fond of luxuries for himself, but miserly for others, even his own family, to whom he gave "pensions disproportionate to his means." This professor endeavored to collect accounts of the reigns of Honoré V and of his brother and successor, Prince Florestan, and to translate them from Italian to French, for the purpose of better understanding the causes of the ever-increasing anti-monarchist movements, especially in former parts of the Principality like Menton and Roquebrune-Cap-Martin. One ordinance, dated from 1815, suggested that Prince Honoré V was not only miserly but greedy, that he brought even "the benches of the parish church, which some persons had built at their own expense", under his control, for his own profit.

After his carriage was stopped by order of Napoleon, Prince Honoré V spent time talking with the emperor. After leaving, he notified the Sardinian authorities of Napoleon's return. This led to English troops being sent to Monaco, who were under command of Colonel Burke, in the service of George III. Upon seeing the troops, a guard closed the gates. This resulted in a 3-month long occupation of Monaco.

France, who were neglecting to garrison Monaco, gave up the territory to instead be a protectorate of the Kingdom of Sardinia with the treaty of Stupinigi. This also resulted in the laws of Monaco and Sardinia were assimilated, which resulted in Monaco's tobacco manufacture being closed. The loss of revenue that followed led to higher tax rates.

Gustave Saige described him as a loner who did not trust anyone, including his brother, to help him govern. He was invisible to the public. His focus was on the crippled economy of Monaco; he raised taxes and tried to restore the tobacco plant his grandfather Honoré III had founded but which had been closed by the government of Turin. He endeavored to open factories and initiate citrus farm cooperatives in order put people to work, generate production, and alleviate poverty. However, none of his efforts raised his popularity, as his measures were seen by the people as autocratic.

== Child and succession ==
Honoré V never married. He had a son, with his mistress Félicité de Gamaches, Louis Gabriel Oscar Grimaldi. Honoré's son was legitimized, but the throne nevertheless passed to Honoré's brother, Florestan.

== Ancestry ==
Ancestors of Honoré V of Monaco

16. Jacques III de Goyon de Matignon
8. Jacques Goyon de Matignon, Prince of Monaco
17. Charlotte de Goyon de Matignon, Countess of Thorigny
4. Honoré III Grimaldi, Prince of Monaco
18. Antonio Grimaldi, Prince of Monaco
9. Louise Hippolyte Grimaldi, Princess of Monaco
19. Marie of Lorraine
2. Honoré IV, Prince of Monaco
20. Anton Giulio Brignole Sale, 5th Marquis of Groppoli
10. Giuseppe Brignole Sale, 7th Marquis of Groppoli
21. Isabella Brignole Sale
5. Maria Caterina Brignole Sale
22. Francesco Maria Balbi, Doge of Genoa
11. Maria Anna Balbi
23. Maria Clarice Durazzo
1. Honoré V, Prince of Monaco
24. Louis Marie d'Aumont, 4th Duke of Aumont
12. Louis Marie d'Aumont, 5th Duke of Aumont
25. Catherine de Guiscard
6. Louis Marie d'Aumont, 6th Duke of Aumont
26. Jean Baptiste de Durfort, 3rd Duke of Duras
13. Victoire Félicité de Durfort
27. Princess Marie Angélique of Bournonville
3. Louise Félicité d'Aumont, Duchess Mazarin
28. Jean Baptiste de Durfort, 3rd Duke of Duras (= 26)
14. Emmanuel Félicité de Durfort, 4th Duke of Duras
29. Princess Marie Angélique de Bournonville (= 27)
7. Louise Jeanne de Durfort, Duchess Mazarin
30. Guy Jules de La Porte Mazarin, Duke Mazarin
15. Charlotte Antoinette de La Porte Mazarin
31. Louise Françoise de Rohan

Honoré V of Monaco House of Grimaldi Born: 13 May 1778 Died: 2 October 1841
Regnal titles
Preceded by Honoré IV	Prince of Monaco; 1819–1841	Succeeded by Florestan
Monegasque royalty
Preceded by Honoré IV	Hereditary Prince of Monaco; 1814–1819	Succeeded by Florestan
Preceded by Honoré IV	Marquis of Baux; 1814–1819	Succeeded by Florestan
Titles of nobility
Preceded by Honoré IV	Duke of Valentinois; 1819–1841	Succeeded by Florestan
