= Château de Marchais =

Château in Marchais, France

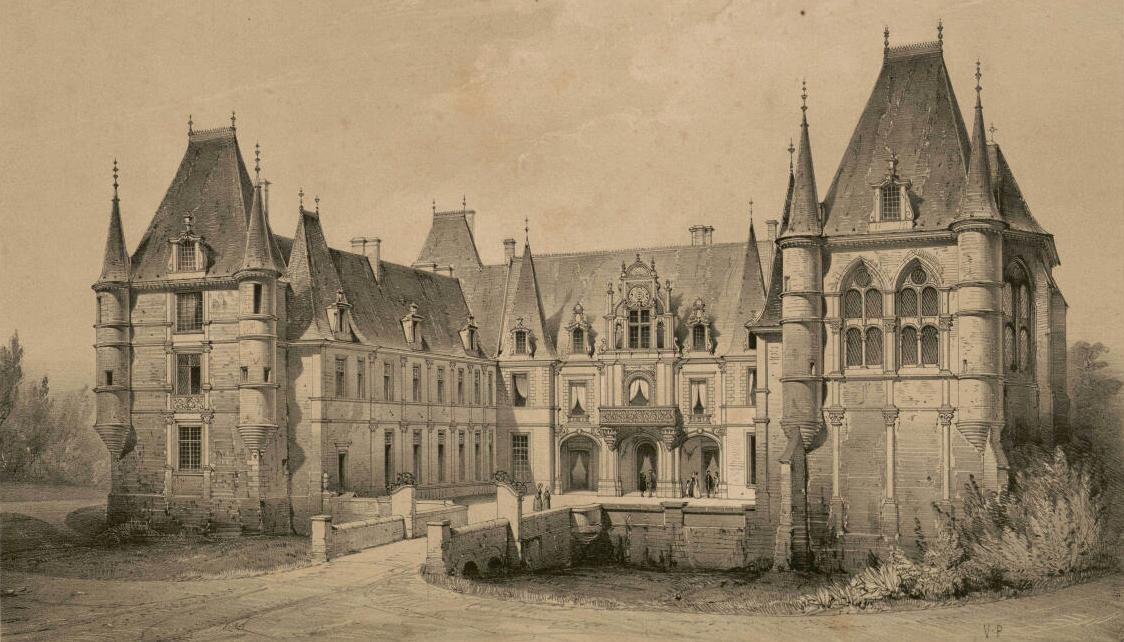
- Late 19th century drawing
- Interactive map of the Château de Marchais area

General information
- Type: Chateau
- Location: Marchais, Aisne, France
- Coordinates: 49.5866°N 3.8135°E
- Completed: 16th century
- Owner: Albert II, Prince of Monaco

The Château de Marchais is an historic château in Marchais, Aisne, near Laon in northern France.

== History ==
The château was built in the 16th century. It was purchased in 1553 by Charles, Cardinal of Lorraine, a member of the House of Guise. From 1836 to 1854, the château belonged to Senator Achille Joseph Delamare.

It has been in the possession of the Monégasque princely family since 1854. Prince Albert I of Monaco married Lady Mary Victoria Hamilton at the château in 1869. Prince Charles III of Monaco died there in 1889.

In 1927, Léon-Honoré Labande, the archivist of the Prince's Palace of Monaco, authored Le château et la baronnie de Marchais. During the Battle of France, Louis II, Prince of Monaco, remained in possession of the chateau until forced to leave by the advance of German troops on May 17, 1940.

The property contains two farms; its acreage is six times the size of the principality of Monaco. In the mid-1980s, Prince Rainier III of Monaco acquired a herd of camels, an African buffalo and two guanacos from a bankrupt zoo, and placed them at the château.
