= Emmanuel Félicité de Durfort, 4th Duke of Duras =

French politician, diplomat, peer, marshal and Freemason

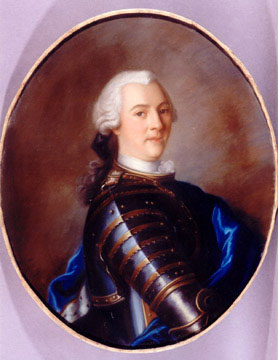
c. 1750 portrait by Jean Baptiste Lefebvre

Emmanuel Félicité de Durfort, Duke of Duras (French: [emanɥɛl felisite də dyʁfɔʁ]; 19 September 1715 – 6 September 1789, Versailles) was a French politician, diplomat, peer, marshal and Freemason (belonging to the l'Olympique de la Parfaite Estime lodge).

== Biography ==
He was the son of Jean-Baptiste de Durfort de Duras and Marie Angélique Victoire de Bournonville.
Aged 18, by his father's abdication of the title, he was already a duke and a musketeer. He took part in all Louis XV's campaigns – that in Italy (1733–1734), on the Rhine (1735 et 1743), in Bavaria (1742), and in Flanders (1744–1745) where he promoted to Maréchal de camp.

He served as French ambassador to Spain (1752–55), after which he was made a peer of France in December 1755. He was then given command of Brittany, the governorship of Franche-Comté and the post of Premier gentilhomme de la chambre du roi. In 1755, he was made governor of Château Trompette in Bordeaux.

After the outbreak of the Seven Years' War, he fought in the Battle of Hastenbeck (1757) and later in Germany (1760–1761). He received the rank of Marshal of France in March 1775.

In 1757, he was made head of the "Comédie-Française" and the "comédie italienne". He was elected to seat 34 of the Académie Française on 2 May 1775. It is said he contributed to the editing of the articles on military science for the Encyclopédie. Also a bibliophile, his library was dispersed at auction in 1790.

=== Marriage and children ===
His first marriage, in May 1733, was to Charlotte Antoinette de la Porte Mazarin (1719–1735), only daughter of the duc de Mazarin. They had one daughter Louise-Jeanne (1735-1781), who married the 6th Duke of Aumont and was mother of Louise d'Aumont, Hereditary Princess of Monaco.

His second marriage, in June 1736, was to Louise Maclovie de Coëtquen, daughter of Malo III de Coëtquen, the phantom of Château de Combourg mentioned by Chateaubriand. In 1761 he sold part of her dowry, including the county of Combourg to the father of Chateaubriand.
They had several children, including Emmanuel-Céleste de Durfort (1741–1800), 5th Duke of Duras.

== See also ==
- Guy Aldonce de Durfort de Lorges, his great-grandfather
