= Jean Baptiste de Durfort, 3rd Duke of Duras =

French nobleman

Jean Baptiste de Durfort, duc de Duras (28 January 1684 – Paris, 8 July 1770) was a French nobleman as duc de Duras and was created a Marshal of France while also having the additional rank of a Peer of France.

== Biography ==
Jean-Baptiste de Durfort was the second son of Jacques Henri de Durfort de Duras, duc de Duras, Marshal of France, and Marguerite-Felice de Levis-Ventadour.
With the death of his older brother Jacques-Henri II in September 1697, he became duc de Duras; marquis de Blanquefort; comte de Rauzan; baron de Pujols, de Landrouet, et de Cypressac; seigneur de Chitain, d'Urbize, de Cambert etc. . His father resigned in 1689 and died in 1704.

On 10 June 1702, he took part in the unsuccessful surprise attack on Nijmegen as part of the War of the Spanish Succession. On 30 March 1710, he was made Maréchal de camp and on 31 March, he was appointed Lieutenant-général des Armées du Roi. On 13 May 1731 he was accepted into the Order of the Holy Spirit. In 1733 he passed his titles on to his son Emmanuel-Félicité de Durfort.

During the War of the Polish Succession, he took part in the Siege of Kehl (1733) and the Siege of Philippsburg (1734). In 1741 he was appointed Marshal of France. In 1755 he became Governor of Franche-Comté. In December 1755, the Duchy of Duras was raised to a peerage.

== Marriage and Children ==
He married on 6 January 1706 Marie Angélique Victoire de Bournonville (1686-1764), daughter of Alexandre-Albert-François-Barthelemy, Duke and Prince de Bournonville (1662-1705). They had :

- Victoire Félicité de Durfort (1706-1753), married
  - in 1720, Henry James Fitzjames, son of James FitzJames, duc de Berwick (died 1721)
  - in 1727, Louis-Marie-Augustin d'Aumont (1709–1782), Duc d'Aumont.
- Emmanuel-Félicité de Durfort (1715-1789), duc de Duras.

== Sources ==
- Père Anselme. Histoire généalogique et chronologique de la maison royale de France. T. V. — P., 1730., p. 739
- Père Anselme, Potier de Courcy, P. Histoire généalogique et chronologique de la maison royale de France. T. IX, partie 2. — P.: Firmin Didot Frères, 1879., p. 603
- Pinard F.-J.-G. Chronologie historique-militaire. T. III. — P.: Claud Herissant, 1761., pp. 316—320
- La Roque L. de, Catalogue historique des généraux français. — P.: 1902, pp. 27—29
- Bouillet-Chassang
- geneanet
