= Honoré IV of Monaco =

Prince of Monaco from 1814 to 1819

Honoré IV
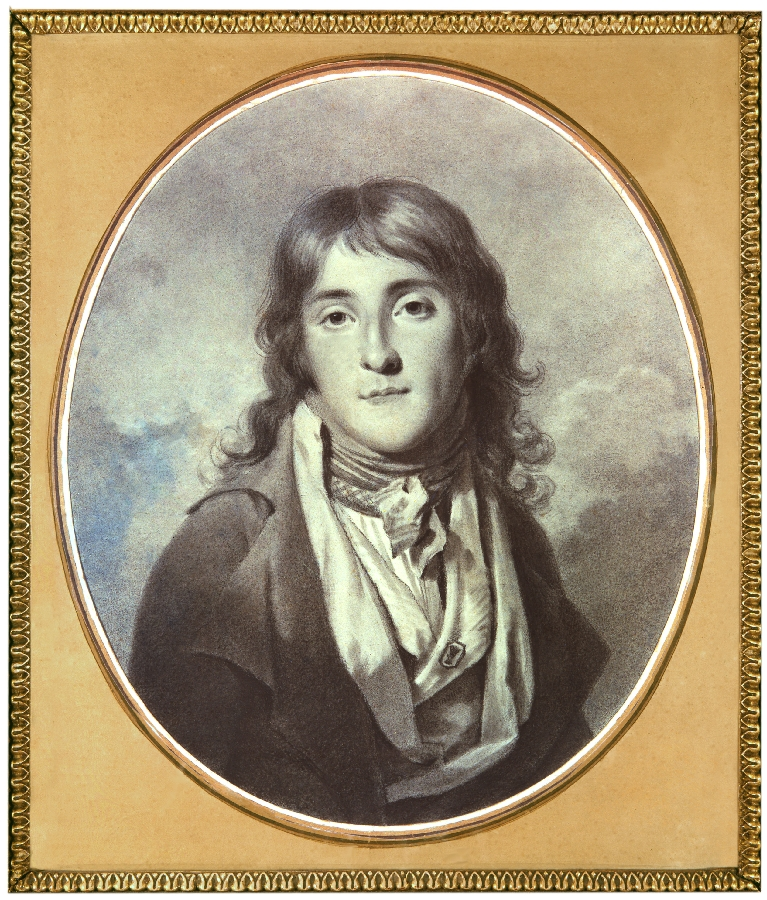

Prince of Monaco
- Reign: 30 May 1814 – 16 February 1819
- Predecessor: National Convention as de facto ruling government Honoré III as previous reigning monarch
- Successor: Honoré V
- Born: 17 May 1758; Paris, France
- Died: 16 February 1819 (aged 60)
- Burial: Saint Nicholas Cathedral, Monaco
- Spouse: Louise d'Aumont (m. 1777; div. 1798)
- Issue: Honoré V, Prince of Monaco; Florestan, Prince of Monaco
Names
- Honoré Charles Anne Grimaldi
- House: Grimaldi
- Father: Honoré III, Prince of Monaco
- Mother: Maria Caterina Brignole

Honoré IV (Honoré Charles Anne Grimaldi; 17 May 1758 – 16 February 1819) was Prince of Monaco and Duke of Valentinois from 1814 to 16 February 1819. Because of his illness, the state of affairs was managed by a regency of his brother Joseph Grimaldi and his son Prince Honoré V.

== Life ==
Honoré IV was the son of Prince Honoré III and Maria Caterina Brignole.

During the French occupation of Monaco, Honoré IV was imprisoned for several years. After the fall of Napoleon I in 1814, he regained control of the principality – thanks to a clause added by Charles Maurice de Talleyrand-Périgord at the Congress of Vienna stating, "the Prince of Monaco should return to his estates" – and passed on his titles to his eldest son, Prince Honoré V.

Illnesses resulting from his imprisonment incapacitated Honoré IV in his later years, and following the re-establishment of the Principality in 1814, a regency was established to rule in Honoré's name. This regency was directed, first, by his brother Joseph Grimaldi, then from 1815 by his son, the Hereditary Prince Honoré, who succeeded him in 1819 as Sovereign Prince Honoré V.

== Family ==
Honoré IV married Louise Félicité Victoire d'Aumont, Duchess of Aumont, Duchess Mazarin and of La Meilleraye on 15 July 1777 in Paris. They divorced in 1798 and had two sons:

1. Honoré V, Prince of Monaco (1778–1841)
2. Florestan, Prince of Monaco (1785–1856)

Royal Monogram of Prince Honoré IV of Monaco

== Ancestry ==
Ancestors of Honoré IV of Monaco

8. Jacques III Goyon de Matignon
4. Jacques I, Prince of Monaco
9. Charlotte Goyon de Matignon, Countess de Thorigny
2. Honoré III Grimaldi, Prince of Monaco
10. Antonio I, Prince of Monaco
5. Louise Hippolyte Grimaldi, Princess of Monaco
11. Marie de Lorraine-Armagnac
1. Honoré IV, Prince of Monaco
12. Anton Giulio Brignole Sale, 5th Marchese di Groppoli
6. Giuseppe Maria Brignole Sale, 7th Marchese di Groppoli
13. Isabella Brignole Sale
3. Maria Caterina Brignole Sale
14. Francesco Balbi, Doge of Genoa
7. Maria Anna Balbi
15. Maria Clarice Durazzo

Prince Honoré IV House of Grimaldi Born: 17 May 1758 Died: 16 February 1819
Regnal titles
Preceded by Honoré III	Prince of Monaco; 1814–1819	Succeeded by Honoré V
Monegasque royalty
Preceded by Charles Maurice	Hereditary Prince of Monaco; 1758–1814	Succeeded by Honoré
