= Honoré III of Monaco =

Prince of Monaco from 1733 to 1793

Honoré III
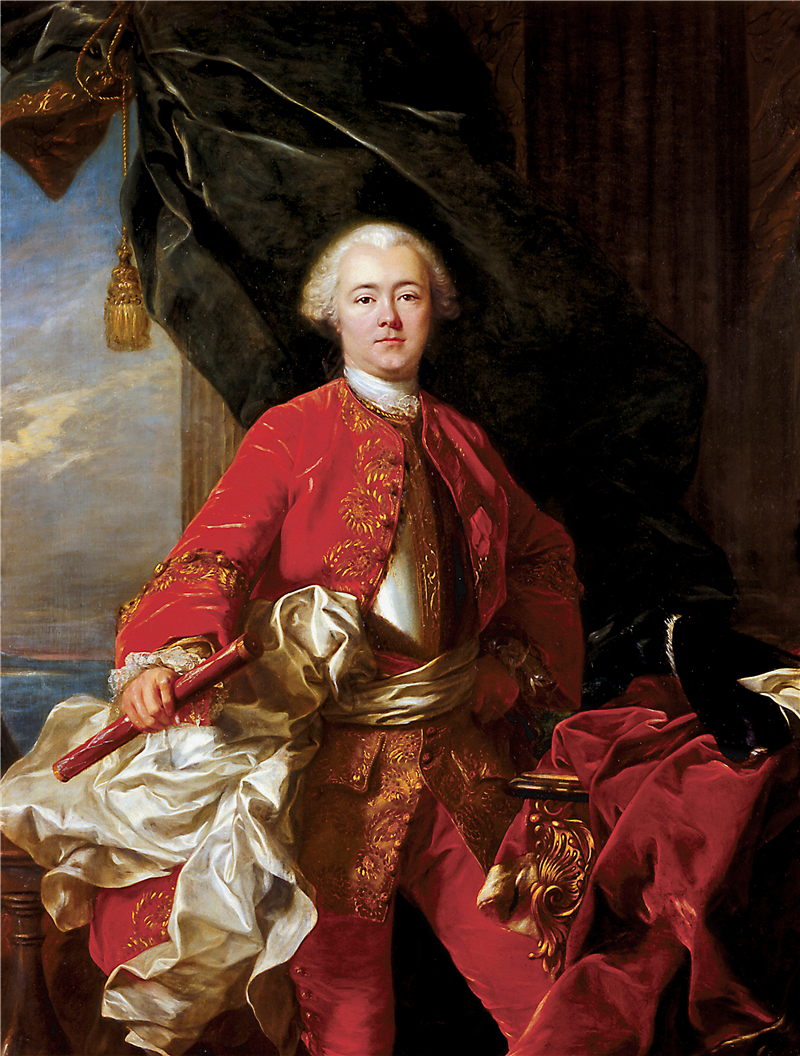
- Portrait by Jean-Baptiste van Loo

Prince of Monaco
- Reign: 7 November 1733 – 19 January 1793
- Predecessor: Jacques I
- Successor: National Convention as de facto ruling government Honoré IV as next reigning monarch
- Regent: Antoine Grimaldi (1733–1784)
- Born: 10 November 1720
- Died: 21 March 1795 (aged 74)
- Spouse: Maria Caterina Brignole (m. 1757; sep. 1770)
- Issue: Honoré IV, Prince of Monaco; Prince Joseph
Names
- Honoré Camille Léonor Grimaldi
- House: Grimaldi
- Father: Jacques Goyon de Matignon
- Mother: Princess Louise Hippolyte I, Princess of Monaco

Honoré III (Honoré Camille Léonor Grimaldi; 10 November 1720 – 21 March 1795) ruled as Prince of Monaco and was Duke of Valentinois from 1733 to 1793. Honoré was the son of Louise Hippolyte, Princess of Monaco, and her husband, Prince Jacques I.

== Life ==
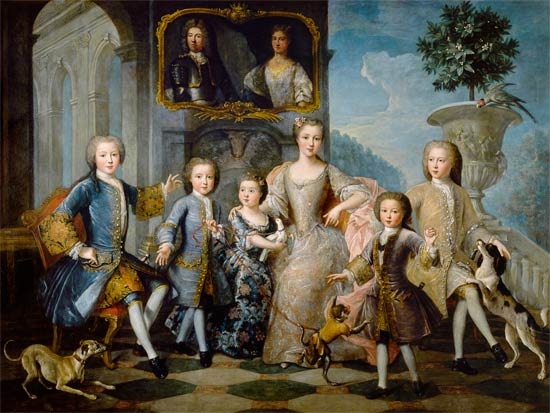
Honore the first to the left with his siblings

Honoré was born on 10 November 1720.

On 20 May 1732, he moved to Hôtel Matignon in Paris with his father and remained there, even after the proclamation in 1733 of him as Prince of Monaco after his father's abdication. Antoine Grimaldi, le Chevalier de Grimaldi, acted as regent for the prince between 1732 and 1784, when Honoré chose to reside in Paris or the Château des Matignon in Normandy. This situation remained the same for half a century until Antoine's death in 1784, when Honoré III was already 64 years old. Although he was open to the revolutionary ideas of the time, he was imprisoned on 20 September 1793. At his liberation a year later, he was ruined, and his property under seal.

== Family ==
While in Paris, it was suggested that he marry Marie Louise de La Tour d'Auvergne, but the marriage never materialised. In 1751, he married Maria Caterina Brignole (d. 1813).

The couple had two children; Honoré IV, Prince of Monaco and Joseph Grimaldi (10 September 1763 – 28 June 1816) before legally separating in 1770, and Marie-Catherine married her long-time companion Prince de Condé in 1798, after her husband's death.

== Ancestry ==
Ancestors of Honoré III of Monaco

16. Charles Goyon de Matignon
8. François Goyon de Matignon (= 20)
17. Eleonor d'Orléans-Longueville
4. Jacques III Goyon de Matignon
18. Charles II Claude Malon, Lord of Bercy
9. Anne Malon de Bercy (= 21)
19. Catherine Habert de Montmort
2. Jacques Goyon de Matignon, Prince of Monaco
20. François Goyon de Matignon (= 8)
10. Henri Goyon de Matignon, Count of Thorigny
21. Anne Malon de Bercy (= 9)
5. Charlotte Goyon de Matignon, Countess of Thorigny
22. François Le Tellier, Baron de La Luthumière
11. Marie Francoise Le Tellier, Lady of Luthumière
23. Charlotte Crespin du Bec
1. Honoré Grimaldi, Prince of Monaco
24. Ercole Grimaldi, Marquis of Baux
12. Louis Grimaldi, Prince of Monaco
25. Maria Aurelia Spinola
6. Antonio Grimaldi, Prince of Monaco
26. Antoine de Gramont, Duke of Gramont
13. Catherine Charlotte de Gramont
27. Françoise Marguerite du Plessis de Chivré
3. Louise Hippolyte Grimaldi, Princess of Monaco
28. Henri of Lorraine, Count of Harcourt
14. Louis of Lorraine, Count of Armagnac
29. Marguerite Philippe du Cambout
7. Marie of Lorraine
30. Nicolas de Neufville, 1st Duke of Villeroy
15. Catherine de Neufville
31. Marie de Créquy, Dame de Mions

Prince Honoré III House of Grimaldi Born: 10 November 1720 Died: 21 March 1795
Regnal titles
Preceded by Jacques I	Prince of Monaco; 1733–1793	Succeeded by Honoré IV
