= Duke of Valentinois =

Title of nobility originally within French peerage

Duke of Valentinois (French: Duc de Valentinois; Italian: Duca Valentino) is a title of nobility, originally in the French peerage. It is currently one of the many hereditary titles claimed by the Prince of Monaco despite its extinction in French law in 1949. Though it originally indicated administrative control of the Duchy of Valentinois, based around the city of Valence, the duchy has since become part of France, making the title simply one of courtesy.

It has been created at least four times: on August 17, 1498, for Cesare Borgia, in 1548 for Diane of Poitiers, in 1642 for Prince Honoré II of Monaco, and most recently in 1715 for Prince Jacques I of Monaco.

== First creation ==
King Louis XII of France and Naples created Cesare Borgia Duke of Valentinois in 1498. Both the Italianized form of this title and his previous appointment as Cardinal of Valencia led to his commonly used nickname: "Il Valentino" (or "Duke Valentino"). After Cesare's death, his daughter Louise Borgia (1500–1553) did not become Duchess suo jure due to the male-only succession of the title, but was instead styled "Dame Valentinois", titular Duchess of Romagna and Countess of Diois.

Duke	Birth	Tenure	Death	Marriage(s) Issue	Claim
Cesare Borgia Other titles List: Duke of Romagna; Duke of Urbino; Prince of Piombino; Count of Diois	13 September 1475; Rome, Papacy Natural son of Pope Alexander VI and Vannozza dei Cattanei	17 August 1498 – 12 March 1507	12 March 1507; Viana, Navarre Killed during the Siege of Viana (aged 31)	Charlotte of Albret (m. 1499; wid. 1507); 1 children	Created duke by King Louis XII

== Second creation ==
King Henry II of France created his mistress Diane de Poitiers Duchess of Valentinois in 1548. She was the only suo jure Duchess and her title was destinated to end after her death, due to the Salic law commonly used among French nobility.

Duke	Birth	Tenure	Death	Marriage(s) Issue	Claim
Diane de Poitiers Other titles List: Duchess of Étampes; Countess of Diois; Baroness d'Ivry	3 September 1499; Saint-Vallier, Dauphiné Daughter of Jean de Poitiers and Jeanne de Batarnay	17 August 1548 – 25 April 1566	25 April 1566; Château d'Anet, Orléanais Died by natural causes (aged 66)	Louis de Brézé (m. 1515; d. 1531); 2 children	Created duchess by King Henry II

== Third creation ==
King Louis XIII created the title by letters patent, signed in May 1642 and registered on 18 July 1642, as a conglomeration of several estates in the French province of Dauphiné which he had previously given to Honoré II, Prince of Monaco.

The first person to hold the title was Honoré II, Prince of Monaco, reigning Prince at the time of its creation; on his death it passed to his grandson Louis I, and thence to Louis's son Antoine. However, since the title's inheritance was restricted to male heirs, and because Antoine had only daughters and no sons, it was due to pass his brother, François-Honoré Grimaldi, but became extinct on 22 July 1715 when François-Honoré forfeited his right to succeed Antoine.

Duke	Birth	Tenure	Death	Marriage(s) Issue	Claim
Honoré II Other titles List: Prince of Monaco (more...)	24 December 1597; Monaco Son of Ercole of Monaco and Maria Landi	18 July 1642 – 10 January 1662	10 January 1662; Monaco Died by natural causes (aged 64)	Ippolita Trivulzio (m. 1616; d. 1538); 1 son	Created duke by King Louis XIII
Louis I Other titles List: Prince of Monaco (more...)	25 July 1642; Monaco Son of Ercole, Marquis of Baux and Maria Aurelia Spinola	10 January 1662 – 3 January 1701	3 January 1701; Rome, Papacy Died by natural causes (aged 58)	Catherine de Gramont (m. 1660; d. 1678); 6 children	Grandson of Honoré II (male proximity)
Antoine I Other titles List: Prince of Monaco (more...)	25 January 1661; Paris, France Son of Louis I and Catherine de Gramont	3 January 1701 – 22 July 1715 (Devolved his rights)	20 February 1731; Monaco Died by natural causes (aged 70)	Marie of Lorraine (m. 1688; d. 1724); 6 daughters	Son of Louis I (male proximity)

== Fourth creation ==
On 20 October 1715, Antoine's eldest daughter and heiress Louise-Hippolyte married Jacques-François de Goyon-Matignon, who had signed a contract on 5 September 1715 by which he was obliged to take the surname Grimaldi. King Louis XV thereupon recreated the title of Valentinois by letters patent, signed in December 1715 and registered on 2 September 1716, for Jacques, who was to succeed his father-in-law Antoine as Prince Jacques I; like the previous creation, its inheritance was restricted to male heirs.

After Jacques's abdication in 1733, the title passed uninterrupted for several generations from Prince to Prince: from Jacques to Honoré III, Honoré IV, Honoré V, Florestan I, Charles III, Albert I. Albert bestowed the title of Duchess of Valentinois upon his adopted granddaughter Charlotte, thenceforth known as Princess Charlotte, Duchess of Valentinois, on 20 May 1919. On 20 March 1920, shortly after Charlotte's marriage to Pierre de Polignac, he, like Jacques-François de Goyon-Matignon, took the title of Duke of Valentinois, having already changed his surname to Grimaldi.

Duke	Birth	Tenure	Death	Marriage(s) Issue	Claim
Jacques I Other titles List: Prince of Monaco (more...)	21 November 1689; Torigni-sur-Vire Son of Jacques de Matignon and Charlotte de Thorigny	2 September 1716 – 7 November 1733 (Ceded his title)	23 April 1751; Hôtel Matignon, Paris Died by natural causes (aged 61)	Louise Hippolyte of Monaco (m. 1715; d. 1731); 9 children	Created duke by King Louis XV
Honoré III Other titles List: Prince of Monaco (more...)	10 November 1720; Hôtel Matignon, Paris Son of Jacques I and Louise Hippolyte of Monaco	7 November 1733 – 21 March 1795	21 March 1795; Paris, France Died imprisoned by revolutionaries (aged 74)	Maria Caterina Brignole (m. 1751; wid. 1795); 2 children	Son of Jacques I (male proximity)
Honoré IV Other titles List: Prince of Monaco (more...)	17 May 1758; Hôtel Matignon, Paris Son of Honoré III and Maria Caterina Brignole	21 March 1795 – 16 February 1819	16 February 1819; Monaco Died by natural causes (aged 60)	Louise d'Aumont (m. 1777; div. 1798); 2 children	Son of Honoré III (male proximity)
Honoré V Other titles List: Prince of Monaco (more...)	13 May/14 May 1778; Hôtel Matignon, Paris Son of Honoré IV and Louise d'Aumont	16 February 1819 – 2 October 1841	2 October 1841; Hôtel Matignon, Paris Died by natural causes (aged 63)	Never married	Son of Honoré IV (male proximity)
Florestan I Other titles List: Prince of Monaco (more...)	10 October 1785; Hôtel Matignon, Paris Son of Honoré IV and Louise d'Aumont	2 October 1841 – 20 June 1856	20 June 1856; Hôtel Matignon, Paris Died by natural causes (aged 70)	Maria Caroline Gibert de Lametz (m. 1816; wid. 1856); 2 children	Son of Honoré IV (male proximity)
Charles III Other titles List: Prince of Monaco (more...)	8 December 1818; Hôtel Matignon, Paris Son of Florestan I and Maria Caroline Gibert de Lametz	20 June 1856 – 10 September 1889	10 September 1889; Château de Marchais Died by natural causes (aged 70)	Antoinette de Mérode (m. 1846; d. 1864); 1 children	Son of Florestan I (male proximity)
Albert I Other titles List: Prince of Monaco (more...)	13 November 1848; Hôtel Matignon, Paris Son of Charles III and Antoinette de Mérode	10 September 1889 – 26 June 1922	26 June 1922; Hôtel Matignon, Paris Died by natural causes (aged 73)	(1) Mary Victoria Hamilton (m. 1869; div. 1880); 1 children (2) Alice Heine (m. 1889; wid. 1922); Childless	Son of Charles III (male proximity)
Louis II Other titles List: Prince of Monaco (more...)	12 July 1870; Baden, Baden Son of Albert I and Mary Victoria Hamilton	26 June 1922 – 9 May 1949	9 May 1949; Monaco Died by natural causes (aged 78)	Ghislaine Dommanget (m. 1946; wid. 1949); Childless	Son of Albert I (male proximity)

Although Albert I had granted the title of Valentinois to his granddaughter Charlotte, its right to succession remained with Louis II and his legitimate male descendants; consequently, on his death without a male heir in 1949, it became extinct in French law and under Salic Law. However, his successor, Rainier III (son of Charlotte), still claimed it, possibly in the belief, as suggested by François Velde, that it was "implicitly recreated for Charlotte by the French Republic in 1919 when her adoption was approved". However, the various French Republics have never created nor re-created any dukedom.

According to the Almanach de Gotha, the title used in Monaco corresponds to a Monegasque concession of a title which otherwise would not be recognized in France, specially having in account that when Charlotte was created Duchess by her father, her grandfather was still the living Prince of Monaco with the right to the title of Duke, and only his son could succeed to the French title. Beside, only legitimate children can inherit French titles.

- Princess Charlotte (1919–1977)
- Rainier III (15 November 1977–6 April 2005)
- Albert II (6 April 2005–Present)

== See also ==
- List of French dukedoms
