= Marie de Lorraine =

Marie de Lorraine may refer to one of the following;

- Marie de Guise (1515–1560) mother of Mary, Queen of Scots
- Marie de Lorraine, Duchess of Guise (1615–1688) daughter of Charles, Duke of Guise
- Marie de Lorraine (1674–1724) daughter of Louis, Count of Armagnac, wife of Antonio I, Prince of Monaco
