= Charlotte of Lorraine-Armagnac =

Charlotte
- Mademoiselle d'Armagnac
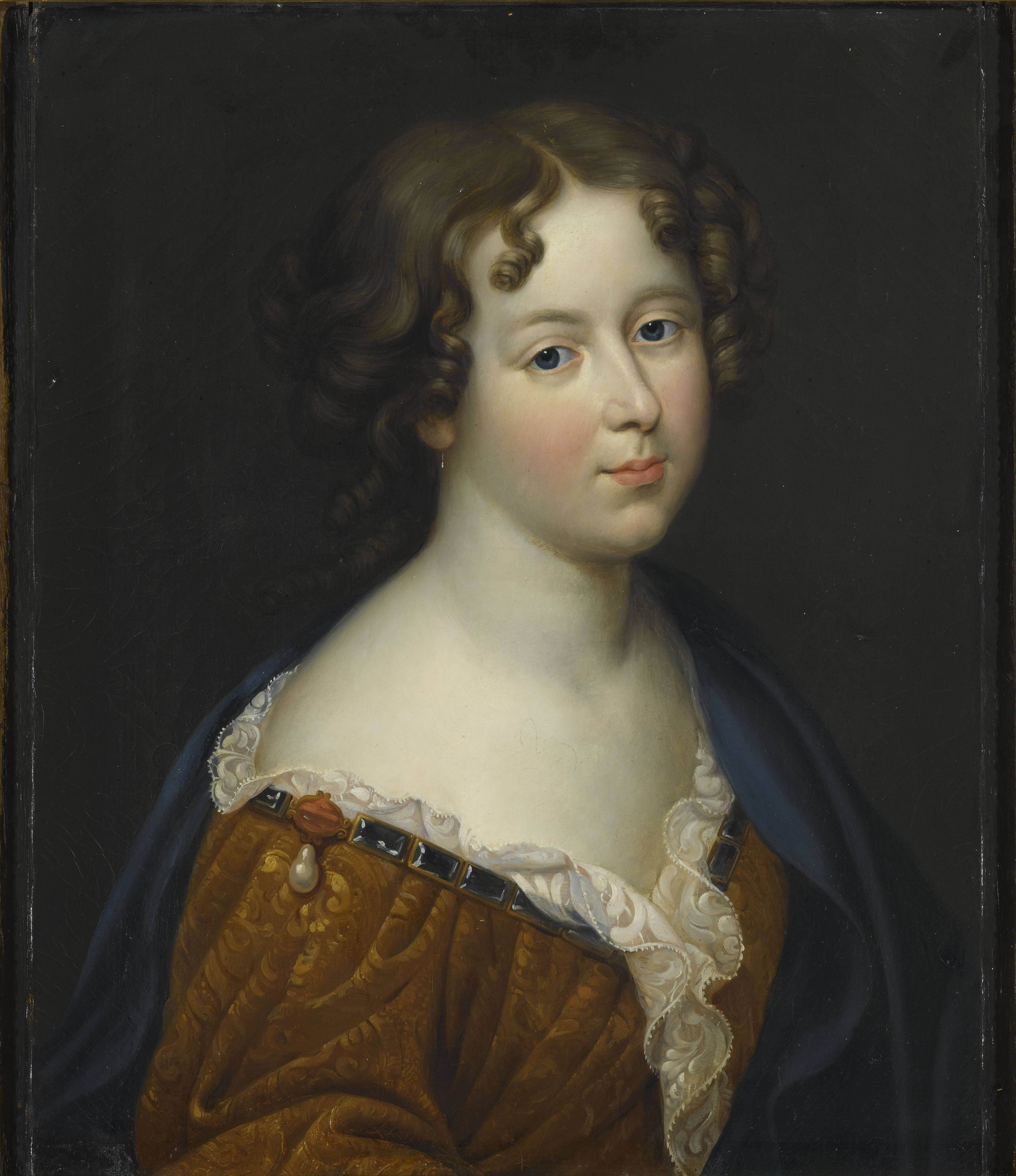
- Born: 6 May 1678
- Died: 21 January 1757 (aged 79)
Names
- Charlotte de Lorraine
- House: Guise
- Father: Louis, Count of Armagnac
- Mother: Catherine de Neufville

Charlotte of Lorraine (6 May 1678 – 21 January 1757) was a Princess of Lorraine by birth and daughter of Louis, Count of Armagnac. She was known as Mademoiselle d'Armagnac.

== Biography ==
Charlotte of Lorraine was the eleventh of fourteen children born to Prince Louis of Lorraine and Catherine de Neufville (1639-1707). She belonged to the House of Guise, a cadet branch of the House of Lorraine, entitled to the rank of prince étranger in France. She was raised with her sister Marie of Lorraine, mother of Louise Hippolyte Grimaldi. Charlotte's own mother was a daughter of Nicolas de Neufville, a Marshal of France and one time governor of Louis XIV.

Styled Mademoiselle d'Armagnac, she was a celebrated beauty at the court and was a favourite of Louis XIV and was described by Madame de Sévigné as a beautiful and likeable woman. After the marriage of her sister Marie to the Duke of Valentinois (future Prince of Monaco) the court paid close attention to the range of suitors that were offered to Charlotte. These included the famous Saint Simon; the Margrave of Ansbach, brother of the future Queen Caroline of Great Britain as well as various other French noblemen.

According to the Marquis de Crequy the princess was alongside the marquises grandmother ,"the two most exactly formalistic persons of the court and of the city, including the presidents of Mortier."

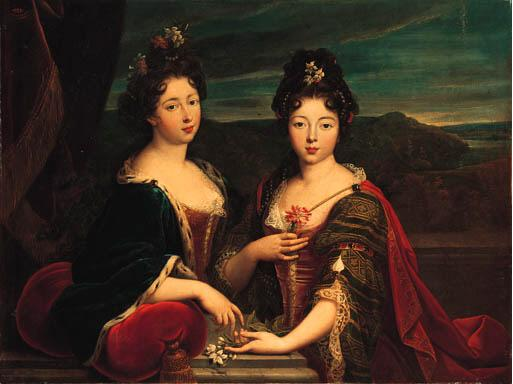

Another candidate was Louis Alexandre de Bourbon, Count de Toulouse, youngest son of Louis XIV and his mistress Madame de Montespan. Louis opposed the match and gave her a pension in return for her losses. She died unmarried having outlived her many siblings.
