= 1731 =

1731 in various calendars
- Gregorian calendar: 1731; MDCCXXXI
- Ab urbe condita: 2484
- Armenian calendar: 1180; ԹՎ ՌՃՁ
- Assyrian calendar: 6481
- Balinese saka calendar: 1652–1653
- Bengali calendar: 1137–1138
- Berber calendar: 2681
- British Regnal year: 4 Geo. 2 – 5 Geo. 2
- Buddhist calendar: 2275
- Burmese calendar: 1093
- Byzantine calendar: 7239–7240
- Chinese calendar: 庚戌年 (Metal Dog); 4428 or 4221 — to — 辛亥年 (Metal Pig); 4429 or 4222
- Coptic calendar: 1447–1448
- Discordian calendar: 2897
- Ethiopian calendar: 1723–1724
- Hebrew calendar: 5491–5492
- Hindu calendars
- Vikram Samvat: 1787–1788
- Shaka Samvat: 1652–1653
- Kali Yuga: 4831–4832
- Holocene calendar: 11731
- Igbo calendar: 731–732
- Iranian calendar: 1109–1110
- Islamic calendar: 1143–1144
- Japanese calendar: Kyōhō 16 (享保１６年)
- Javanese calendar: 1655–1656
- Julian calendar: Gregorian minus 11 days
- Korean calendar: 4064
- Minguo calendar: 181 before ROC 民前181年
- Nanakshahi calendar: 263
- Thai solar calendar: 2273–2274
- Tibetan calendar: ལྕགས་ཕོ་ཁྱི་ལོ་ (male Iron-Dog); 1857 or 1476 or 704 — to — ལྕགས་མོ་ཕག་ལོ་ (female Iron-Boar); 1858 or 1477 or 705

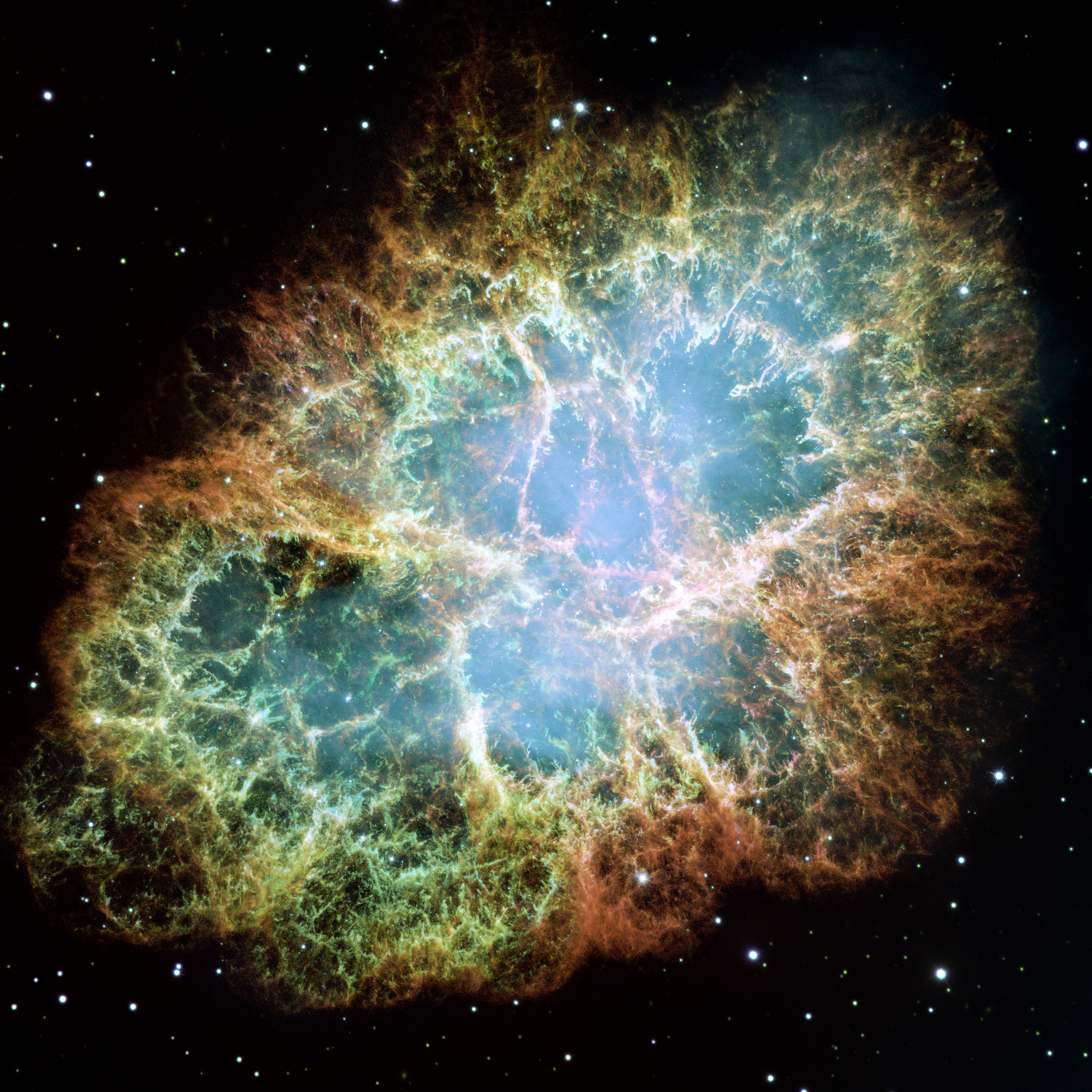
1731: John Bevis becomes first Earth astronomer to observe the Crab Nebula.

1731 (MDCCXXXI) was a common year starting on Monday of the Gregorian calendar and a common year starting on Friday of the Julian calendar, the 1731st year of the Common Era (CE) and Anno Domini (AD) designations, the 731st year of the 2nd millennium, the 31st year of the 18th century, and the 2nd year of the 1730s decade. As of the start of 1731, the Gregorian calendar was 11 days ahead of the Julian calendar, which remained in localized use until 1923.

== Events ==
=== January–March ===
- January 8 – An avalanche from the Skafjell mountain causes a massive wave in the Storfjorden fjord in Norway that sinks all boats that happen to be in the water at the time and kills people on both shores.
- February 3 – A fire in Brussels at the Coudenberg Palace, at this time the home of the ruling Austrian Duchess of Brabant, destroys the building, including the state records stored therein.
- February 20 – Louise Hippolyte becomes the second woman to serve as Princess of Monaco, the reigning monarch of the tiny European principality, ascending upon the death of her father Prince Antonio. She reigns only nine months before dying of smallpox on December 29.
- March 16 – The Treaty of Vienna is signed between the Holy Roman Empire, Great Britain, the Dutch Republic and Spain.

=== April–June ===
- April 9 – British trader Robert Jenkins has his ear cut off after his ship, Rebecca is boarded by Spanish coast guards at Havana in Cuba. The incident becomes the casus belli for the War of Jenkins' Ear in 1739.
- April 28 – A fire at White's Chocolate House, near St. James's Palace in London, destroys the historic club and the paintings therein, but is kept from spreading by the fast response of firemen.
- May 10 – The Pacific Fleet of the Russian Navy is established by order of the Empress Anna of Russia, who directs Grigory Skornyakov-Pisarev to assume command over the new fleet and to develop Okhotsk as a major port.
- June 4 – The English market town of Blandford Forum is destroyed by fire, with the exception of 26 houses. About one-third of the uninsured losses are paid for by the collection of disaster relief money.

=== July–September ===
- August 15 – King Frederick William I of Prussia forgives his 19-year-old son, Prince Frederick, who has been confined since November to the town of Küstrin (now Kostrzyn nad Odrą in Poland) for his 1730 attempt to desert from the Prussian Army. Nine years later, having been politically rehabilitated, Prince Frederick succeeds his father as King and is later remembered as "Frederick the Great".
- August 23 – The oldest known sports score in history is recorded in the description of a cricket match at Richmond Green in England, when the team of Thomas Chambers of Middlesex defeats the Duke of Richmond's team by 119 to 79.
- September – The first successful appendectomy is performed by English surgeon William Cookesley.
- September 30 – The village of Barnwell, Cambridgeshire, England, is "burned down entirely" by a fire.

=== October–December ===
- October 23 – A fire at Ashburnham House in Westminster destroys 114 irreplaceable manuscripts (including a manuscript of the Anglo-Saxon Chronicle) and damages 98 others (among them the manuscript of Beowulf). Richard Bentley, the King's librarian and the House's owner, saves the only copy of the Codex Alexandrinus, carrying it under one arm as he leaps from a window. Bentley's ten year labor in translating the Greek Testament is ruined by the blaze. The remaining 844 manuscripts later form the heart of the collections of the British Library.
- November 25
  - Swiss mathematician Leonhard Euler announces his use of the irrational number e (approximately 2.71828) as the base for the concept of the natural logarithm, describing it in a letter to German mathematician Christian Goldbach.
  - Patrona Halil, an ethnic Albanian and a janissary who instigated a mass uprising in 1730 within the Ottoman Empire that brought Mahmud I to power as the new Sultan, is strangled to death in Mahmud's presence after the rebellion is suppressed.
- December 21 – The Maharaja Chhatrasal, monarch of Bundelkhand in India (part of the modern-day states of Uttar Pradesh and Madhya Pradesh) dies at the age of 82. His kingdom is divided into four parts, with one part going to Baji Rao I of the Marathas and the other three going to his three sons: Harde Sah gets the Panna State, Jagat Rai gets the Jaitpur State and Bharti Chand gets the Jaso State.
- December 29 – Jacques Grimaldi, the husband of the reigning monarch of Monaco, Louise Hippolyte, succeeds to the throne after Louise's death from smallpox. Jacques I rules until his own death in 1751.

=== Date unknown ===
- Royal Colony of North Carolina Governor George Burrington asks the North Carolina General Assembly to pass an act establishing a town on the Cape Fear River, in what is seen as a political move to shift the power away from the powerful Cape Fear plantation class. The town is laid out in 1733, and incorporated as Wilmington in 1740.
- Laura Bassi becomes the first official female university teacher, on being appointed professor of anatomy at the University of Bologna, at the age of 21.

== Births ==
- February – Charles Churchill, English poet (d. 1764)
- March 19 – Gabriela Silang, Filipino rebel leader and heroine (d. 1763)
- April 8 – William Williams, signer of the United States Declaration of Independence (d. 1811)
- May 8 – Beilby Porteus, Bishop of London and abolitionist (d. 1809)
- June 2 – Dorothea Biehl, Danish writer (d. 1788)
- July 16 – Samuel Huntington, Patriot in the American Revolution and politician (d. 1796)
- August – Henry Constantine Jennings, English gambler and collector (d. 1819)

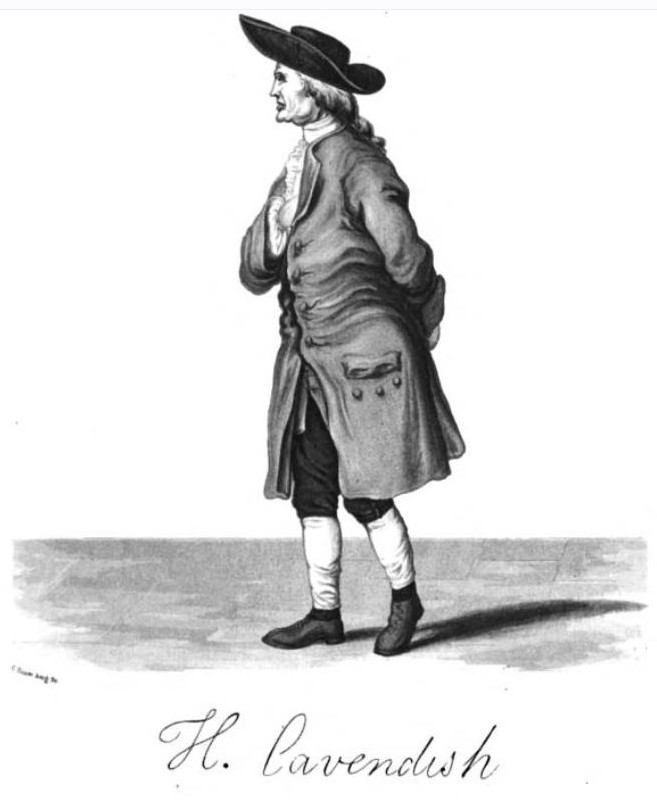
Henry Cavendish

- October 10 – Henry Cavendish, English scientist (d. 1810)
- November 9 – Benjamin Banneker, African-American astronomer, surveyor of the District of Columbia (d. 1806)
- November 15 – William Cowper, English poet (d. 1800)
- December 8 – František Xaver Dušek, Czech composer (d. 1799)
- December 12 – Erasmus Darwin, English scientist and grandfather of Charles Darwin (d. 1802)
- December 28 – José de Viera y Clavijo, Spanish writer
- Nikephoros Theotokis, Greek scholar and theologian (d. 1800)

== Deaths ==
- January 6 – Étienne François Geoffroy, French chemist (b. 1672)
- January 20 – Antonio Farnese, Duke of Parma (b. 1679)

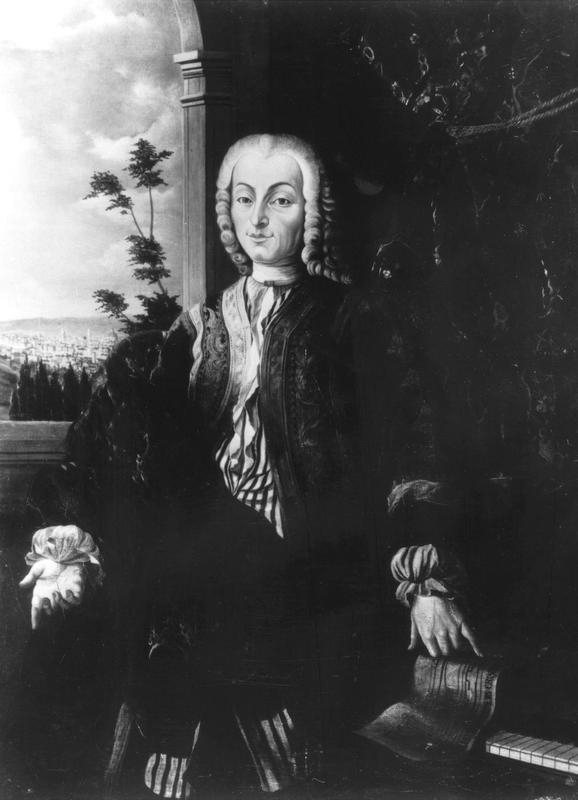
Bartolomeo Cristofori

- January 27 – Bartolomeo Cristofori, Italian maker of musical instruments (b. 1655)
- February – Thomas Hancorne, Welsh clergyman and theologian (b. 1642)
- February 10 – George Carpenter, 1st Baron Carpenter, British Army general (b. 1657)
- February 15 – Mary of Jesus de León y Delgado, Spanish Dominican lay sister and mystic (b. 1643)
- February 22 – Frederik Ruysch, Dutch physician and anatomist (b. 1638)
- March 5 – Abd al-Ghani al-Nabulsi, Sufi academic (b. 1641)
- March 6 – Johann Melchior Dinglinger, German goldsmith (b. 1664)
- March 8 – Ferdinand Brokoff, Czech sculptor (b. 1688)
- March 12 – Ernest August, Duke of Schleswig-Holstein-Sonderburg-Augustenburg (b. 1660)
- March 23 – Augustus William, Duke of Brunswick-Lüneburg (b. 1662)
- April 24 – Daniel Defoe, English writer (b. c. 1660)
- April 28 – Johann Theodor Jablonski, German lexicographer (b. 1654)
- May 1 – Johann Ludwig Bach, German composer (b. 1677)
- May 11 – Mary Astell, English feminist writer (b. 1666)
- May 17 – Samuel Bradford, English churchman, Whig politician (b. 1652)
- June 20 – Ned Ward, English writer, publican (b. 1667)
- July 18 – Sir Walter Yonge, 3rd Baronet, English politician (b. 1653)
- August 27 – Eudoxia Lopukhina, Russian Tsarina, divorced spouse of Peter the Great of Russia (b. 1669)
- December 17 – George Lockhart, Scottish writer, spy and politician, killed in duel (b. 1673)
- December 20 – Chhatrasal, Maharaja of Madhya Pradesh (b. 1649)
- December 26 – Antoine Houdar de la Motte, French writer (b. 1672)
- December 29 – Louise Hippolyte, Princess of Monaco (b. 1697)
