= Antoine Grimaldi =

Antoine Grimaldi may refer to:

- Antonio I, Prince of Monaco (1661–1731), or Antoine de Monaco, Prince of Monaco
- Chevalier de Grimaldi (1697–1784), natural son of Antonio I, Governor General of the Principality of Monaco

== See also ==
- House of Grimaldi
