= Princess Charlotte of Monaco (1719–1790) =

Monegasque princess and nun

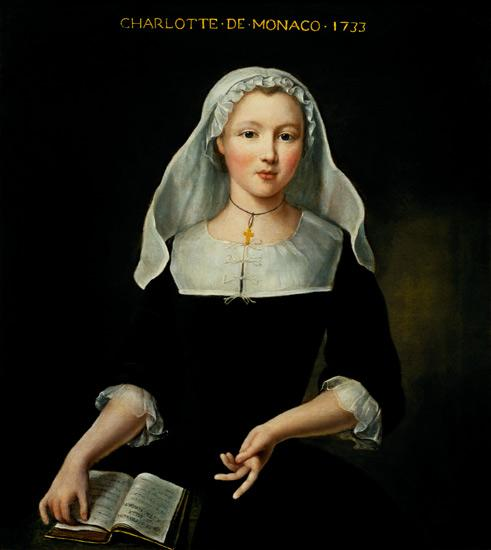
- Portrait of Charlotte by Pierre Gobert in 1733
- Born: 19 March 1719; Hôtel Matignon, Paris; Kingdom of France
- Died: 30 March 1790
Names
- Charlotte Thérèse Nathalie Grimaldi; Monégasque: Teresa-Natalia de Mu̍negu
- House: Grimaldi
- Father: Jacques I, Prince of Monaco
- Mother: Louise Hippolyte, Princess of Monaco
- Occupation: Nun

Princess Charlotte Thérèse Nathalie of Monaco (Monégasque: Teresa-Natalia de Mu̍negu; 19 March 1719 – 1790) was a Monegasque princess and a Visitandine nun.

== Biography ==
Princess Charlotte was born on 19 March 1719 at the Hôtel Matignon in Paris to Jacques I, Prince of Monaco and Louise Hippolyte, Princess of Monaco. In 1724, Charlotte was engaged to Frédéric Jules de La Tour, Prince d'Auvergne, however the engagement was broken off and she never married.

In 1733, Pierre Gobert made a portrait of the princess.

On 21 January 1738 Charlotte took religious vows and became a nun at the Convent of the Visitation. A number of times Charlotte left the convent to visit her family.

Charlotte received the veil from the hands of the old Archbishop de Besançon.

She died in 1790.
