= Charlotte de Lorraine =

Charlotte de Lorraine may refer to:

- Charlotte of Lorraine-Armagnac (1678–1757)
- Princess Élisabeth Charlotte of Lorraine (1700–1711)
- Princess Anne Charlotte of Lorraine (1714–1773)
- Anne Charlotte of Lorraine-Brionne (1755–1786)
