= Jacques I of Monaco =

Prince of Monaco from 1731 to 1733

Jacques I
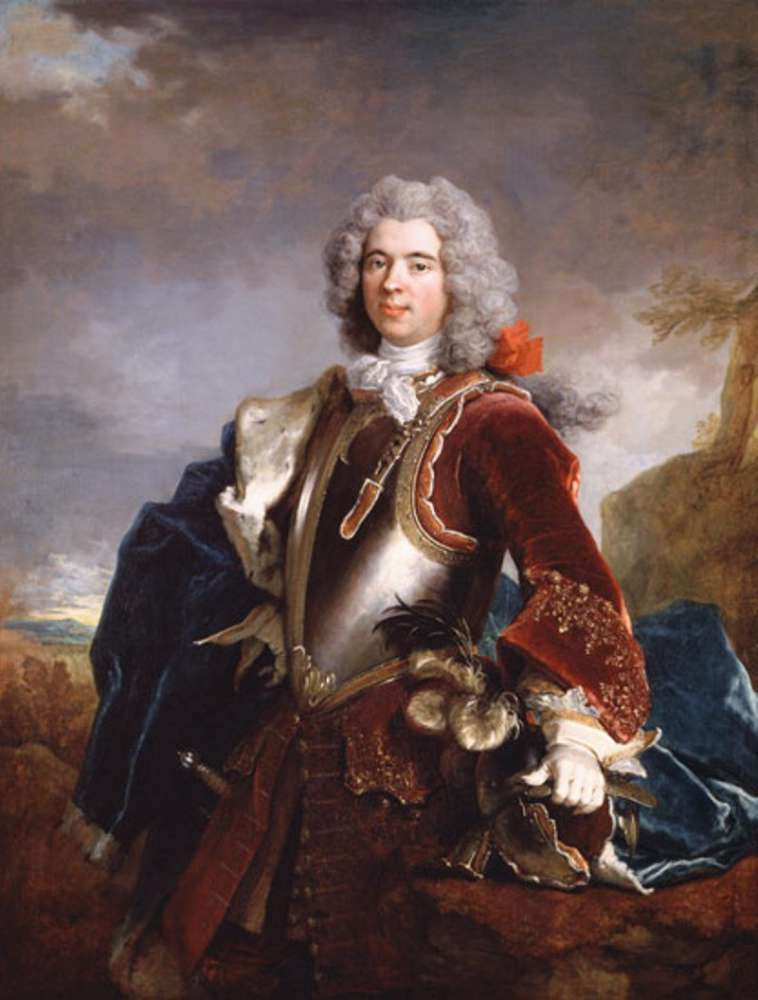
- Portrait by Nicolas de Largillière

Prince of Monaco
- Reign: 29 December 1731 – 7 November 1733
- Predecessor: Louise Hippolyte
- Successor: Honoré III
- Regent: Antoine Grimaldi (1732–1733)

Prince consort of Monaco
- Tenure: 20 February – 29 December 1731
- Born: Jacques François Léonor Goyon de Matignon; 21 November 1689; Torigni-sur-Vire, Normandy, France
- Died: 23 April 1751 (aged 61); Hôtel Matignon, Paris, France
- Spouse: Louise Hippolyte, Princess of Monaco (m. 1715; died 1731)
- Issue Detail: Prince Antoine, Marquis des Baux; Princess Charlotte; Honoré III, Prince of Monaco; Prince Charles, Count of Carladés; Prince Jacques; Princess Louise; Prince François, Count of Thorigny; Prince Charles Maurice, Count of Valentinois; Princess Marie
Names
- Jacques François Léonor Goyon de Grimaldi; Monégasque: Giàcumu Françese Liunardu Goyon de Matignon
- House: Grimaldi (by marriage); Goyon (by birth)
- Father: Jacques Goyon de Matignon, Count de Thorigny
- Mother: Charlotte, Countess of Thorigny

Jacques I (Jacques François Léonor Goyon de Grimaldi, Monégasque: Giàcumu Françese Liunardu Goyon de Matignon; 21 November 1689 – 23 April 1751) was Prince of Monaco from 1731 to 1733. He was also Duke of Valentinois from 1716 until 1733, and Count of Thorigny. For ten months preceding his regency, he had served as prince consort to his wife, Princess Louise Hippolyte.

== Life and reign ==
Jacques came from an ancient Norman family. "Thorigny" is now called Torigni-sur-Vire, where the Mairie is the former family chateau, the Château des Matignon. His uncle was Marshal Charles Auguste de Goÿon de Matignon.

He was a son of Jacques Goÿon de Matignon, jure uxoris Comte de Thorigny, and Charlotte Goyon de Matignon, Comtesse de Thorigny suo jure.

When Antonio I of Monaco and his wife Marie de Lorraine-Armagnac were looking for a consort for their daughter and heir Louise Hippolyte of Monaco, the family proposed him as a candidate. His candidacy was supported by King Louis XIV of France, who wanted to solidify French influence in Monaco.

Jacques and Louise Hippolyte married on 20 October 1715 and had nine children. The wedding ceremony was the first official act that the five-year-old king, Louis XV, carried out during the Regency of Philippe II, Duke of Orléans.

The marriage wasn't very happy. Jacques preferred to stay more in Versailles, where he had several mistresses, than in Monaco.

After the death of Antonio I of Monaco, Louise Hippolyte traveled from Paris to Monaco on 4 April 1731 and received an enthusiastic reception by the population. When Jacques joined her several times later, the reception was much colder.

Jacques served as regent for his wife from 21 February 1731 to her death. At the end of 1731, Louise Hippolyte died of smallpox. Jacques I neglected the affairs of state and, under pressure from the population, had to leave the country in May 1732.

Jacques abdicated in favor of his son Honoré on November 7, 1733.

He spent the last years of his life in Versailles and Paris. It was at Versailles that Louise-Françoise de Bourbon-Maine, a grand daughter of Louis XIV and his mistress, Madame de Montespan, was proposed as a wife for the widowed prince; despite having a large dowry, (she was the daughter of the Louis-Auguste de Bourbon, duc du Maine and his wife, Anne Louise Bénédicte de Bourbon) the marriage never materialised and the prince never married again.

His Paris residence was named after him Hôtel Matignon and is today the official residence of the Prime Minister of France. Prior to his death, he was a frequent visitor to Versailles with his son.

== Issue ==
1. Antoine Charles Marie (16 December 1717 – 4 February 1718), "Marquis des Baux Count of Matignon", died in infancy.
2. Charlotte Thérèse Nathalie (19 March 1719 – 1790), nun at the Convent of Visitation in Paris.
3. Honoré III Camille Léonor (10 November 1720 – 21 March 1795), successor of his father.
4. Charles Marie Auguste (1 January 1722 – 24 August 1749), "Count of Carladés", died unmarried and without issue.
5. Jacques (9 June 1723 – 10 June 1723) died in infancy.
6. Louise Françoise (15 July 1724 – 15 September 1729), Mademoiselle des Baux, died in childhood.
7. François Charles (4 February 1726 – 9 December 1743), "Count of Thorigny", died unmarried without issue.
8. Charles-Maurice (14 May 1727 – 18 January 1798), Count of Valentinois; married on 10 November 1749 to Marie Chrétienne de Rouvroy; no issue.
9. Marie Françoise Thérèse (20 July 1728 – 20 June 1743), Mademoiselle d'Estouteville, died unmarried and without issue.

== Ancestry ==
Ancestors of Jacques I of Monaco

8. Charles Goyon de Matignon
4. François Goyon de Matignon
9. Eleonor d'Orléans-Longueville
2. Jacques III Goyon de Matignon
10. Charles II Claude Malon, Seigneur de Bercy
5. Anne Malon de Bercy
11. Catherine Habert de Montmort
1. Jacques I, Prince of Monaco
12. François Goyon de Matignon (= 4)
6. Henri Goyon de Matignon, Comte de Thorigny
13. Anne Malon de Bercy (= 5)
3. Charlotte Goyon de Matignon, Comtesse de Thorigny
14. François Le Tellier, Baron de La Luthumière
7. Marie Francoise Le Tellier, Dame de Luthumière
15. Charlotte Crespin du Bec

Regnal titles
Preceded by Louise Hippolyte	Prince of Monaco; 29 December 1731 – 7 November 1733	Succeeded by Honoré III
Monegasque royalty
Vacant Title last held by Marie de Lorraine-Armagnac as princess consort	Prince consort of Monaco; 20 February – 29 December 1731	Vacant Title last held by Maria Caterina Brignole-Sale as princess consort
