= Chevalier de Grimaldi =

Regent of Monaco from 1732 to 1784

Antoine Grimaldi
- Chevalier de Grimaldi

Governor-General of Monaco
- Tenure: 20 May 1732 – 28 November 1784
- Monarchs: Jacques I; Honoré III
- Born: 2 October 1697
- Died: 28 November 1784 (aged 87)
- House: Grimaldi
- Father: Antonio I of Monaco
- Mother: Élisabeth Dufort

Antoine Grimaldi, le Chevalier [de] Grimaldi, (Paris, 2 October 1697 – Monaco, 28 November 1784) was the de facto ruler of Monaco between 1732 and 1784. An illegitimate son of Antonio I of Monaco and the dancer Élisabeth Dufort (named Babé), he was recognized by his father in 1715. He was ruler of Monaco in his capacity of Regent for the absent Prince, who stayed in Paris or the Château des Matignon.

== Life ==
The Chevalier de Grimaldi became governor-general of Monaco on 20 May 1732, when his brother-in-law Jacques I, Prince of Monaco and his young nephew Honoré III, Prince of Monaco moved to Hôtel Matignon in Paris and remained there, even after the proclamation in 1734 of Honoré as Prince of Monaco.

This situation remained the same for half a century until Antoine's death in 1784, when Honoré III was already 64 years old.

Antoine was an able regent. For example, he succeeded in keeping Monaco out of the War of the Austrian Succession (1740–1748).

Antoine never married and died on 28 November 1784. His remains were moved in 1966 to the Apse of the Monaco Cathedral.

== See also ==
- List of rulers of Monaco
