= Louise Hippolyte, Princess of Monaco =

Princess of Monaco in 1731

Louise Hippolyte
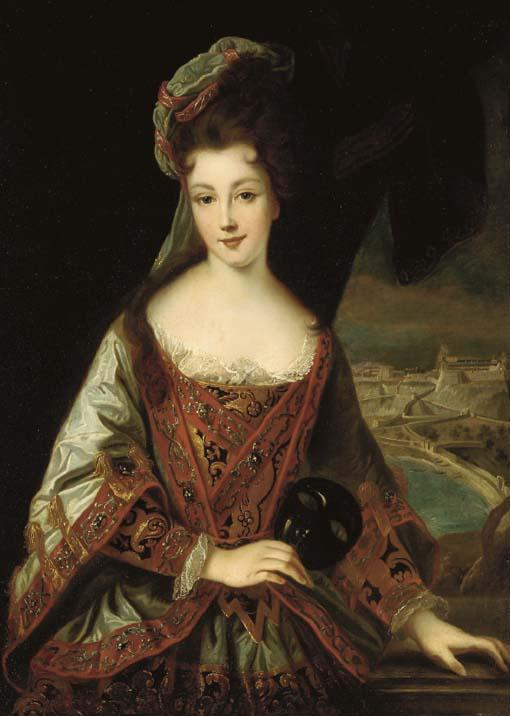
- Portrait by Jean-Baptiste Santerre

Princess of Monaco
- Reign: 20 February 1731 – 29 December 1731
- Predecessor: Antoine I
- Successor: Jacques I
- Born: 10 November 1697; Prince's Palace, Monaco
- Died: 29 December 1731 (aged 34); Prince's Palace, Monaco
- Burial: Saint Nicholas Cathedral
- Spouse: Jacques Goyon, Count of Matignon (later Prince of Monaco) (m. 1715)
- Issue Detail: Prince Antoine, Marquis of Baux; Princess Charlotte; Honoré III, Prince of Monaco; Prince Charles, Count of Carladès; Prince Jacques; Princess Louise; Prince François, Count of Thorigny; Prince Charles Maurice, Count of Valentinois; Princess Marie
Names
- Louise Hippolyte Grimaldi; Monégasque: Luisa Ipòlita Grimaldi
- House: Grimaldi
- Father: Antonio I, Prince of Monaco
- Mother: Marie of Lorraine

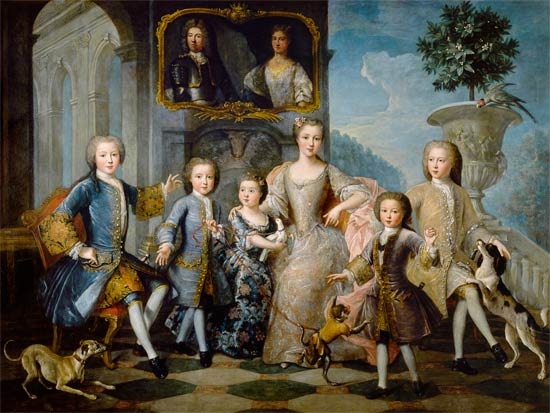
The Family of the Duke of Valentinois, Pierre Gobert

Louise Hippolyte (Monégasque: Luisa Ipòlita Grimaldi; 10 November 1697 – 29 December 1731) was Princess of Monaco from 20 February 1731 until her death in December that same year. She was one of only two women to rule Monaco (along with Lady Claudine).

== Biography ==
Born at the Prince's Palace in Monaco, Louise Hippolyte Grimaldi was the second daughter of Antonio I of Monaco and Marie de Lorraine-Armagnac. The second of six children born to her parents, she was the first of their children to survive infancy. She had an elder sister, Caterina Charlotte (1691–1696), and four younger sisters, Elisabetta Charlotte (1698–1702), Margherita Camilla (1700–1758), Maria Devota (1702–1703) and Maria Paolina Theresa Devota (1708–1726).

Because she had no brothers, Louise Hippolyte became the heiress to the throne of Monaco. Her father decided, with the permission of Louis XIV, that her future husband should assume the surname of Grimaldi and rule Monaco jointly with her.

=== Marriage ===
On 20 October 1715, at the age of eighteen, she married Jacques François Goyon, Count de Matignon, after his family had proposed him as a candidate. His candidacy was supported by King Louis XIV, who wanted to consolidate French influence in Monaco. Prior to this, Louise Hippolyte's father was eager to wed his daughter to a Grimaldi cousin. This marriage did not materialise due to the poor finances of the Grimaldis at the time.

Her parents came to be in conflict when the marriage of Louise Hippolyte was to be arranged in 1712. Antonio preferred Louise Hippolyte to marry the count de Roye, while Marie preferred the count de Chatillon and, supported by her family, refused to consent to Antonio's candidate. This resulted in a conflict which lasted for two years and caused the anger of Louis XIV. Marie successfully convinced Louise Hippolyte to refuse her father's choice, which resulted in Antonio having Louise Hippolyte imprisoned in a convent. Marie left Monaco and travelled to Paris, where Antonio soon discovered that his plans for Louise Hippolyte were disliked at the French court, and he was forced to release her from prison and give up his plans to marry her to Roye. Marie managed to get Antonio to agree to marry Louise Hippolyte to count de Matignon by suggesting Matignon through the Duchess de Lude. After the marriage of Louise and Matignon, Marie returned to Monaco. When Antonio found out that it was in fact Marie who had suggested Matignon, the relationship between Marie and Antonio further worsened.

The conflict filled marriage of her parents was worsened because of their disagreement around Louise Hippolyte's marriage. Louise Hippolyte and Jacques, who was troubled by this state of affairs, left Monaco after their marriage to reside in France, dividing their time between the royal court of Versailles, Paris and their estate in Normandy. The marriage was not happy; Louise Hippolyte was described as a shy and submissive personality, while Jacques openly flaunted his mistresses in the royal court at Versailles. Louise Hippolyte and Jacques had nine children. After the death of her mother in 1724, Louise Hippolyte inherited a substantial fortune.

=== Reign ===
After the death of her father on 20 February 1731, Louise Hippolyte traveled without her family from Paris to Monaco and received an enthusiastic reception from the populace upon her arrival on 4 April 1731. As was customary in the case of female monarchs, it had originally been the plan to proclaim Jacques as her joint co-regent. However, it became clear that the people of Monaco did not welcome a Frenchman as co-ruler of Monaco and would prefer Louise Hippolyte as their sole ruler. Louise Hippolyte took advantage of this and took the oath as ruler of Monaco herself before Jacques had arrived, proclaiming herself as the sole ruler, and declared that no order or law issued would be legal without her signature. It is believed that she did this to protect the rights of herself and her son against her husband's ambitions. When Jacques joined her a little while later, the reception was much colder. Finding himself without power, he soon returned to France. Princess Louise-Hippolyte ruled Monaco for seven months. She is described as a popular ruler during her short reign.

At the end of 1731, Louise Hippolyte died of smallpox. Following her death, her husband took power in Monaco, her son being a minor. Jacques neglected the affairs of Monaco and had to leave the country in May 1732. His ambition was to be declared regent until his son reached the age of 25, after which his son should abdicate his throne to him, but this was not accepted in Monaco.

Jacques abdicated in favor of his son Honoré on November 7, 1733.

== Issue ==
- Antoine Charles Marie (16 December 1717 – 4 February 1718), Marquis des Baux and Count de Matignon, died in infancy.
- Charlotte Thérèse Nathalie (19 March 1719 – 1790), nun at the Convent of Visitation at Paris.
- Honoré III Camille Léonor (10 November 1720 – 21 March 1795), successor of his parents.
- Charles Marie Auguste (1 January 1722 – 24 August 1749), Count de Carladès and de Matignon died aged 27, unmarried and without issue.
- Jacques (9 June 1723 – 10 June 1723) died in infancy.
- Louise Françoise (15 July 1724 – 15 September 1729), Mademoiselle des Baux, died in childhood.
- François Charles (4 February 1726 – 9 December 1743), Count of Thorigny, died aged 17 unmarried and without issue.
- Charles Maurice (14 May 1727 – 18 January 1798), Count de Valentinois; married on 10 November 1749 to Marie Christine Chrétienne de Rouvrois; no issue.
- Marie Françoise Thérèse (20 July 1728 – 20 June 1743), Mademoiselle d'Estouteville, died unmarried and without issue.

== Ancestors ==
Ancestors of Louise Hippolyte, Princess of Monaco

16. Honoré II, Prince of Monaco
8. Hercules of Monaco
17. Ippolita Trivulzio
4. Louis I, Prince of Monaco
18. Luca Spinola, signore di Molfetta
9. Maria Aurelia Spinola
19. Pellina Spinola
2. Antoine I, Prince of Monaco
20. Antoine de Gramont, Duke de Gramont
10. Antoine, Duke de Gramont
21. Louise de Roquelaure
5. Catherine Charlotte de Gramont
22. Hector de Chivré, seigneur du Plessis
11. Françoise Marguerite du Plessis de Chivré
23. Marie de Connan
1. Louise Hippolyte Grimaldi, Princess of Monaco
24. Charles de Lorraine, Duke d' Elbeuf
12. Henri de Lorraine, Count d'Harcourt
25. Marguerite de Chabot
6. Louis de Lorraine, Count of Armagnac
26. Charles du Cambout, Marquis de Coislin
13. Marguerite-Philippe du Cambout
27. Philippe de Beurges, dame de Sivry
3. Marie de Lorraine-Armagnac
28. Charles de Neufville, Marquis de Villeroy
14. Nicolas de Neufville de Villeroy
29. Jacqueline de Harlay de Sancy
7. Catherine de Neufville de Villeroy
30. Charles de Blanchefort, Duke de Créquy Prince of Poix
15. Madeleine de Blanchefort de Créquy
31. Madeleine de Bonne de Lesdiguières

Regnal titles
Preceded by Antonio I	Sovereign Princess of Monaco; 1731	Succeeded by Jacques I
