= Catherine Charlotte de Gramont =

Princess of Monaco from 1662 to 1678

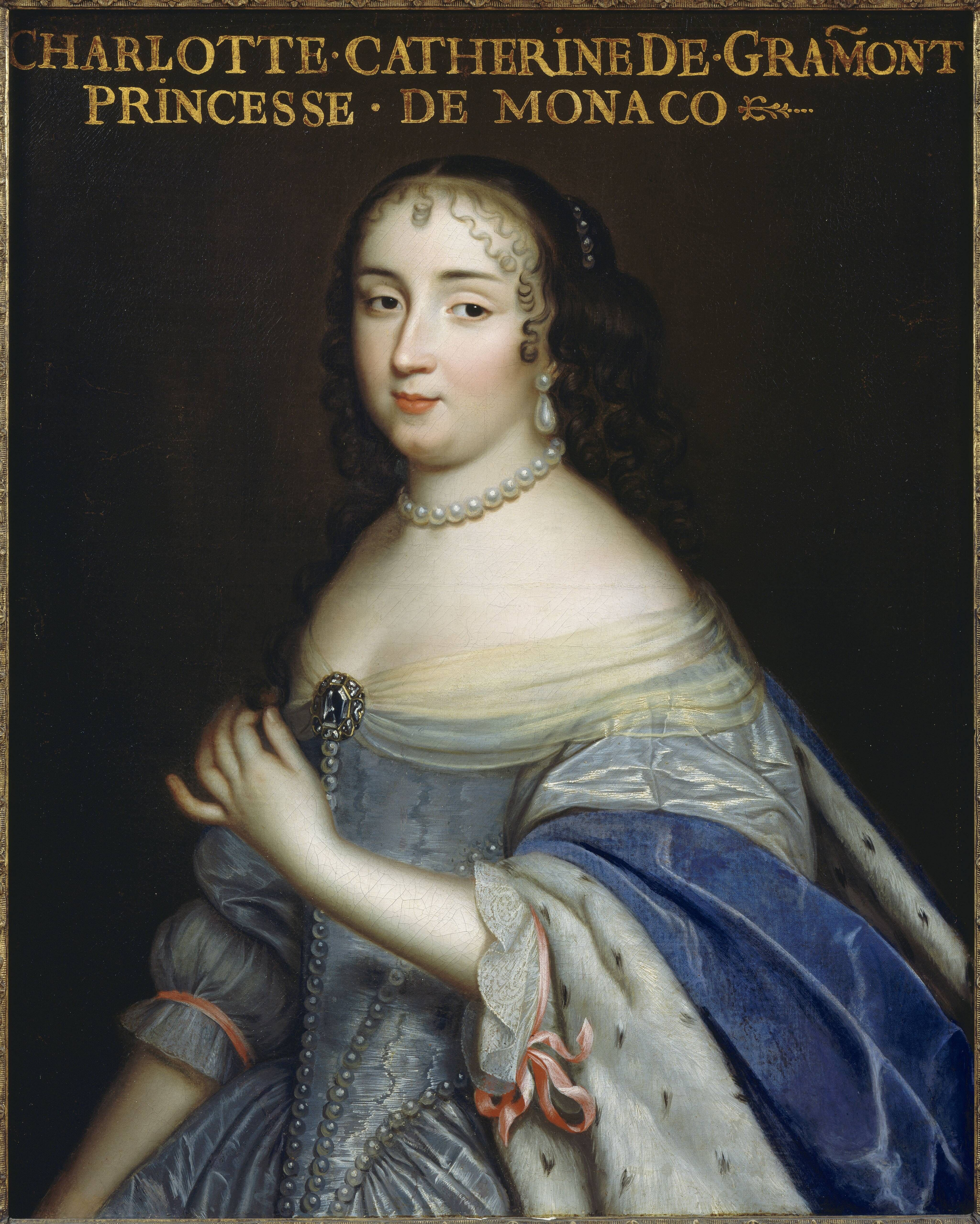

Princess consort of Monaco
- Tenure: 10 January 1662 – 4 June 1678
- Born: 1639
- Died: 4 June 1678 (aged 38–39); Palais Royal, Paris, France
- Spouse: Louis I, Prince of Monaco
- Issue Detail: Antoine, Prince of Monaco; Anna Hippolyte, Duchess of Uzès; François Honoré, Archbishop of Besançon
- House: Gramont (by birth); Grimaldi (by marriage)
- Father: Antoine de Gramont
- Mother: Françoise Marguerite du Plessis

Catherine Charlotte de Gramont (French pronunciation: [katʁin ʃaʁlɔt də ɡʁamɔ̃]; 1639 - 4 June 1678) was Princess of Monaco from 1662 to 1678 as the consort of Prince Louis I, and was once a mistress of Louis XIV of France in 1666.

== Life ==
=== Early life ===
Catherine Charlotte de Gramont was the eldest daughter of Marshal, Duke Antoine de Gramont and Françoise Marguerite du Plessis de Chivré (1608–1689), a niece of Cardinal Richelieu. Catherine Charlotte's elder brother was Guy Armand de Gramont, the celebrated Count of Guiche, known for his arrogance and good looks, who was successively the lover of Philippe of France, Duke of Orléans and Princess Henrietta of England, husband and wife.

Catherine Charlotte was educated in a fashionable convent school, the Visitation Faubourg Saint Jacques in Paris, where many daughters of the aristocracy were educated. She was described as a sophisticated, vivacious, strong-willed beauty. She fell mutually in love with her cousin, Antonin Nompar, marquis de Puyguilleim, and when her father refused his permission for them to marry, they became lovers all the same.

=== Duchess of Valentinois ===
In March 1660 at the Chateau de Gramont, Catherine married Louis de Grimaldi, the second Duke of Valentinois and heir to the throne of Monaco, who was described as "a glorious and avaricious Italian". They had six children.

The marriage was arranged to strengthen the alliance between Monaco and France against Spain by forging a connection between the Princely House of Monaco and a member of the French high nobility, which could provide valuable connections to the French court. Catherine Charlotte's family connections fit this description, Louis was impressed by her beauty, and the French monarch gave his consent. Catherine Charlotte herself was convinced because her lover refused to elope with her, she was older than most noblewomen when they married, and that her marriage would give her a high rank at the French royal court, which she would not have to leave, at least not until her husband became Prince of Monaco. After marriage, the couple resided in Paris and regularly attended the French court, and Catherine Charlotte continued her relationship with her cousin.

=== Princess of Monaco ===
In 1662, she became Princess of Monaco when her husband succeeded to the throne. Catherine Charlotte was forced to accompany him to Monaco against her will, but Puyguilleim accompanied her on the way in disguise. She remained in Monaco for three years. She did not like her stay in Monaco, where the Princely court did not consist of much more than the Grimaldi relatives and hardly any court life or high society life existed at the time.

In 1665, the Prince and Princess of Monaco returned to the French royal court, where Catherine Charlotte was appointed lady-in-waiting to Princess Henrietta of England, sister-in-law and former lover of Louis XIV, with whom she was rumoured to have a bisexual love affair. Her aunt, Suzanne Charlotte de Gramont, marquise de Saint Chaumont, was also a member of Henrietta's household as the governess of her two daughters, Marie Louise and Anne Marie. She continued her love affair with Puyguilleim, but also became involved in a love affair with the Duke de Guiche. She was renowned for her beauty and wits, and attracted many lovers, including the king, the marquis de Villeroi, and her cousin, "the little Lauzun". Madame de Sévigné described her as "greedy for pleasure", and she was nicknamed Catherine the Torrent.

Henrietta encouraged Catherine Charlotte to have an affair with the king to attract him away from his mistress, Louise de la Vallière, back to Henrietta. The king's affair with Catherine Charlotte in danger of being exposed to a public scandal because of Catherine Charlotte's other lovers, de Guiche and Puyguilleim: after a scene at court, there was a fear that the rivalry between the three men (as well as her husband) would result in a duel. After the scene, Catherine Charlotte's husband and her lover Duke de Guiche left the court to serve in the war. In the end, the king did leave Louise de la Vallière, but after his affair with Catherine Charlotte, he did not return to Henrietta, but begun an affair with Madame de Montespan instead.

In 1668, Catherine Charlotte had a love affair with Philippe, Chevalier de Lorraine, lover of the king's brother and Henrietta's husband Philippe I, Duke of Orléans. Henrietta regarded Lorraine to be her mortal enemy and was deeply offended by the affair, and successfully asked the king to exile Catherine Charlotte from court. At the same time, Catherine Charlotte's long-time lover Puyguilleim married. She returned to Monaco, where she lived a quiet life and remained for four years.

In 1672, Catherine Charlotte was able to return to Paris when she was offered a position as lady-in-waiting to the king's mistress, Madame de Montespan. Her employment ended the following year, but she was given her own house in Paris, where she was able to stay. During the following years, however, she fell ill with a progressive cancer.

Catherine Charlotte died in Paris on 4 June 1678, aged 39.

== Issue ==

1. Antoine Grimaldi (25 January 1661 – 20 January 1731) Prince of Monaco, married Marie of Lorraine.
2. Maria Teresa Carlotta Grimaldi (14 January 1662 – 1738), died unmarried.
3. Giovanna Maria Devota Grimaldi (14 January 1662 – 21 April 1741), twin of Maria Teresa, a nun in San Remo.
4. Teresa Maria Aurelia Grimaldi (20 May 1663 – 15 February 1675), Mademoiselle des Baux.
5. Anna Ippòlita Grimaldi (26 July 1664 – 23 July 1700), married Jean Charles de Crussol, 7th Duke of Uzès, son of Emmanuel de Crussol, 5th Duke of Uzès.
6. Francesco Onorato Grimaldi (31 December 1669 – 18 February 1748), Archbishop of Besançon.
7. Amelia Grimaldi (ca. 1675 – died young).

== Ancestors ==
Ancestors of Catherine Charlotte de Gramont

8. Philibert de Gramont, Count of Guiche
4. Antoine, Duke de Gramont
9. Diane d'Andoins
2. Antoine, Duke de Gramont
10. Antoine de Roquelaure
5. Louise de Roquelaure
11. Catherine d'Ornesan
1. Catherine Charlotte de Gramont
12. François de Chivré, seigneur du Plessis
6. Hector de Chivré, seigneur du Plessis
13. Léonore de la Porte
3. Françoise Marguerite du Plessis de Chivré
14. Nicolas de Connan, Lord of Rabastan
7. Marie de Connan
15. Anne d'O

Monegasque royalty
Preceded by Ippolita Trivulzio	Princess consort of Monaco; 10 January 1662 – 4 June 1678	Succeeded by Marie of Lorraine
