= Louis, Count of Armagnac =

Louis
- Count of Armagnac
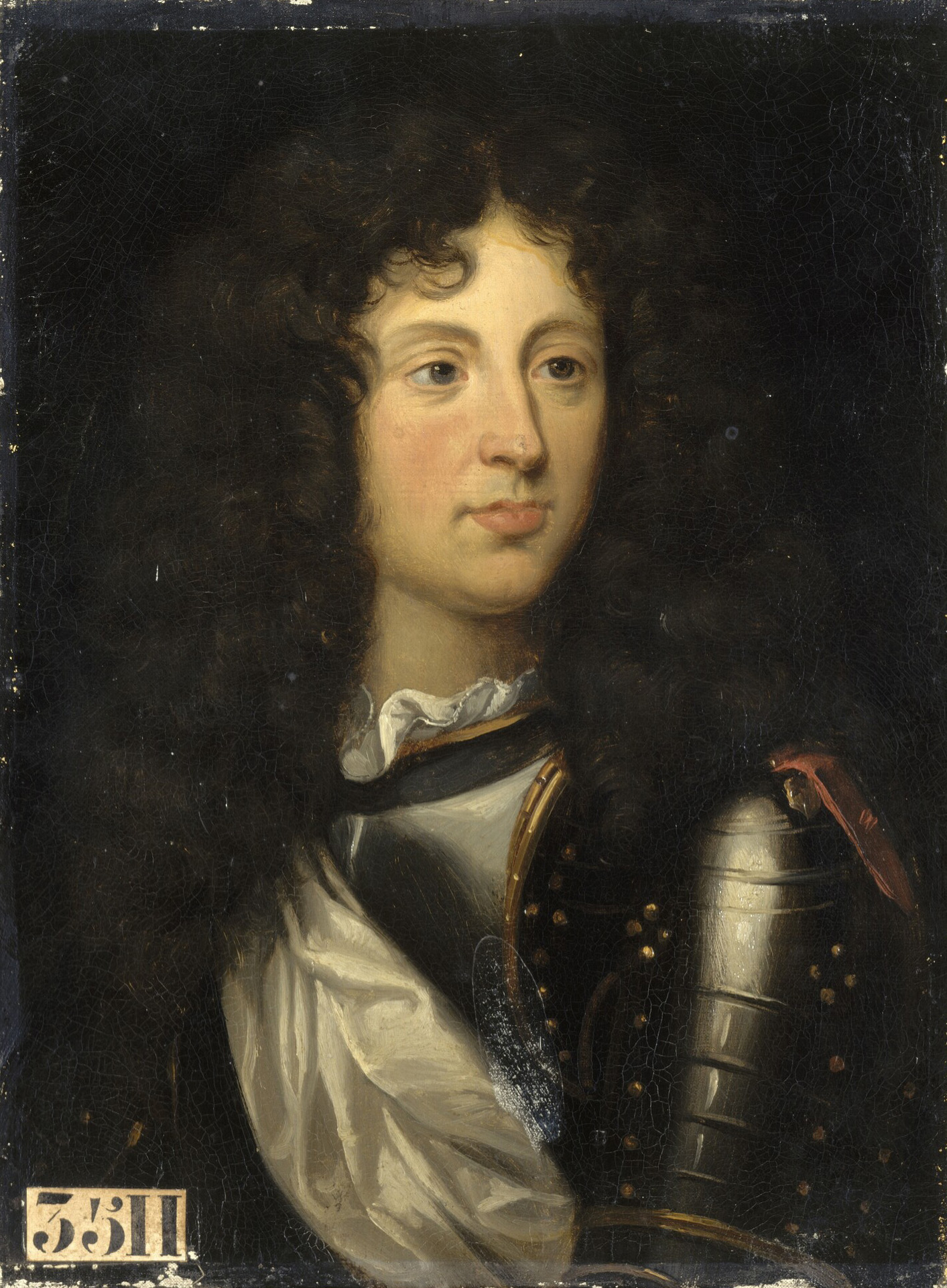
- Born: 7 December 1641; Paris, France
- Died: 13 June 1718 (aged 76); Paris, France
- Spouse: Catherine de Neufville
- Issue Detail: Henri, Count of Brionne; Marguerite, Duchess of Cadaval; Marie, Princess of Monaco; Charlotte, Mademoiselle d'Armagnac; Charles, Count of Armagnac
Names
- Louis de Lorraine
- House: Lorraine
- Father: Henri, Count of Harcourt
- Mother: Marguerite Philippe du Cambout

Louis of Lorraine (7 December 1641 – 13 June 1718) was the Count of Armagnac from his father's death in 1666. The Grand Squire of France, he was a member of a cadet branch of the House of Guise, itself a cadet branch of the sovereign House of Lorraine. His descendants include Albert II, Prince of Monaco, Umberto II of Italy, and Diana Álvares Pereira de Melo, 11th Duchess of Cadaval.

== Biography ==
Louis de Lorraine was born in Paris to Henri de Lorraine, Count of Armagnac and his wife Marguerite Philippe du Cambout. His younger brother, Philippe, Chevalier de Lorraine, was infamously the lover of Monsieur, i.e., Philippe I, Duke of Orléans, younger brother of Louis XIV.

He, like his father before him, was the Grand Squire of France, one of the Great Officers of the Crown of France and a member of the King's Household. At Louis' death, the post, as well as style of Monsieur le Grand, was taken by his son Charles, Count of Armagnac (at Charles' death, it was given to Louis' grandson, the Prince de Lambesc).

At the death of his father in 1666, he inherited the title of Comte d'Armagnac, which, although it evoked the family of the great House of Armagnac, did not entail possession of the vast lands and semi-sovereign authority wielded by the extinct, medieval Counts of Armagnac.

He was created a knight of the Order of the Holy Spirit, the most prestigious military knighthood of the Ancien Régime, on 31 December 1688 at Versailles. His two brothers, Philippe, Chevalier de Lorraine and Charles, Count of Marsan, were also created members of the order on the same day.

He was buried at the Abbey of Royaumont, located near Asnières-sur-Oise in Val-d'Oise, approximately 30 km north of Paris, France. With him is his father and son, François Armand.

== Marriage and issue ==
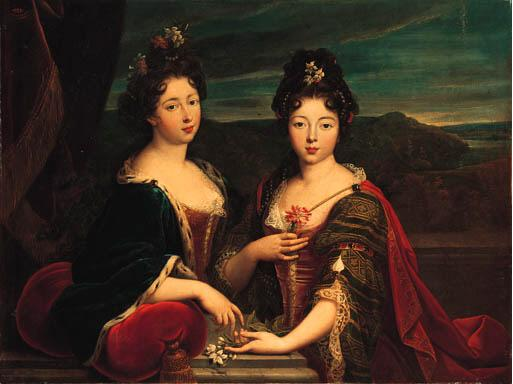
Louis' two daughters the future Princess of Monaco and Mademoiselle d'Armagnac by Nicolas Fouché

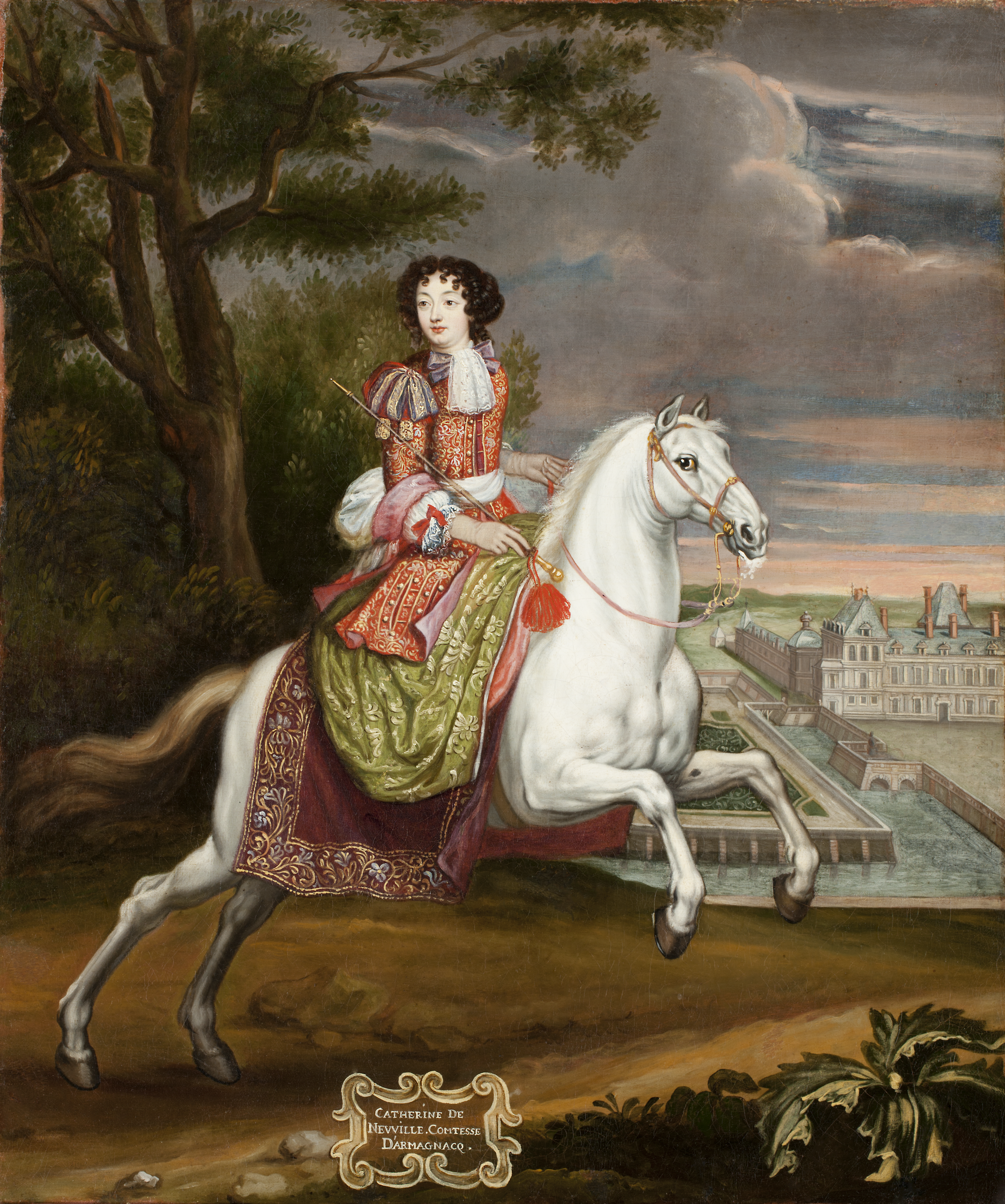
Louis' wife Catherine de Neufville, Comtesse d'Armagnac, 1670s

On 7 October 1660 he was married in Paris to Catherine de Neufville-Villeroy (1639-1707), youngest daughter of Nicolas de Neufville, Duke of Villeroy, who had been governor of the young Louis XIV. She was a sister of François de Neufville de Villeroy, the future governor of Louis XV. The couple had 14 children, of whom only three would have progeny:

1. Henri of Lorraine, Count of Brionne (15 November 1661 – 3 April 1713) married Marie Madeleine d'Épinay and had issue; his great-granddaughter Joséphine de Lorraine was the grand mother of Charles Albert of Sardinia thus an ancestor of the House of Savoy;
2. Marguerite of Lorraine (17 November 1662 – 16 December 1730) married at Versailles on 25 July 1675 by proxy Nuno Álvares Pereira de Melo, 1st Duke of Cadaval and had issue;
3. Françoise of Lorraine (28 February 1664) died in infancy;
4. François Armand of Lorraine, Chevalier de Lorraine (13 February 1665 – 9 June 1728) never married, Abbot of Royaumont;
5. Camille of Lorraine, Count of Chamilly (25 October 1666 – 6 November 1715) never married; died at the Château de Lunéville;
6. Armande of Lorraine (8 July 1668 – 1681) died young;
7. Isabelle of Lorraine (12 June 1671) died in infancy;
8. Philippe of Lorraine (29 June 1673 – 1677) died in infancy;
9. Marie of Lorraine (12 August 1674 – 30 October 1724) married Antonio I, Prince of Monaco at Versailles 13 June 1688 and had issue; they were parents of Louise Hippolyte Grimaldi, suo jure Princess of Monaco; subsequent Sovereign Princes of Monaco descend from them;
10. Louis Alphonse of Lorraine, Bailli d'Armagnac (24 August 1675 – 24 August 1704) never married, died in the Battle of Vélez-Málaga;
11. Charlotte of Lorraine (6 May 1678 – 21 January 1757) never married;
12. Anne Marie of Lorraine (29 September 1680 – 19 December 1712) died in Monaco;
13. Marguerite of Lorraine (20 July 1681) died in infancy;
14. Charles of Lorraine, Count of Armagnac (22 February 1684 – 29 December 1751) married Françoise Adélaide de Noailles, daughter of Adrien Maurice de Noailles, Duc de Noailles, no issue.

Among his many mistresses was Julie d'Aubigny (1673 - 1707), who later known as Mademoiselle Maupin or La Maupin.

== Ancestry ==
Ancestors of Louis, Count of Armagnac

16. Claude de Lorraine, Duke de Guise
8. René de Lorraine, Marquis d'Elbeuf
17. Antoinette de Bourbon
4. Charles de Lorraine, Duke of Elbeuf
18. Claude de Rieux, Count d'Harcourt
9. Louise de Rieux
19. Suzanne de Bourbon-Montpensier
2. Henri de Lorraine, Count of Harcourt
20. Philippe Chabot, Count de Charny
10. Leonor Chabot, Count de Charny
21. Françoise de Longvy
5. Marguerite Chabot
22. Jean IV de Longwy
11. Françoise de Longwy-Rye
23. Jeanne d'Angoulême
1. Louis de Lorraine
24. René du Cambout
12. François du Cambout
25. Françoise Baye
6. Charles du Cambout
26. Louis du Plessis, seigneur de Beçay
13. Louise du Plessis, dame de Beçay
27. Françoise de Rochechouart
3. Marguerite Philippe du Cambout
14. Charles de Beurges, seigneur de Seury
7. Philippe de Beurges, Lady of Seury
15. Jeanne de Lescoët, dame de Mogulaye
