= Hôtel Matignon =

Official residence of French Prime Minister

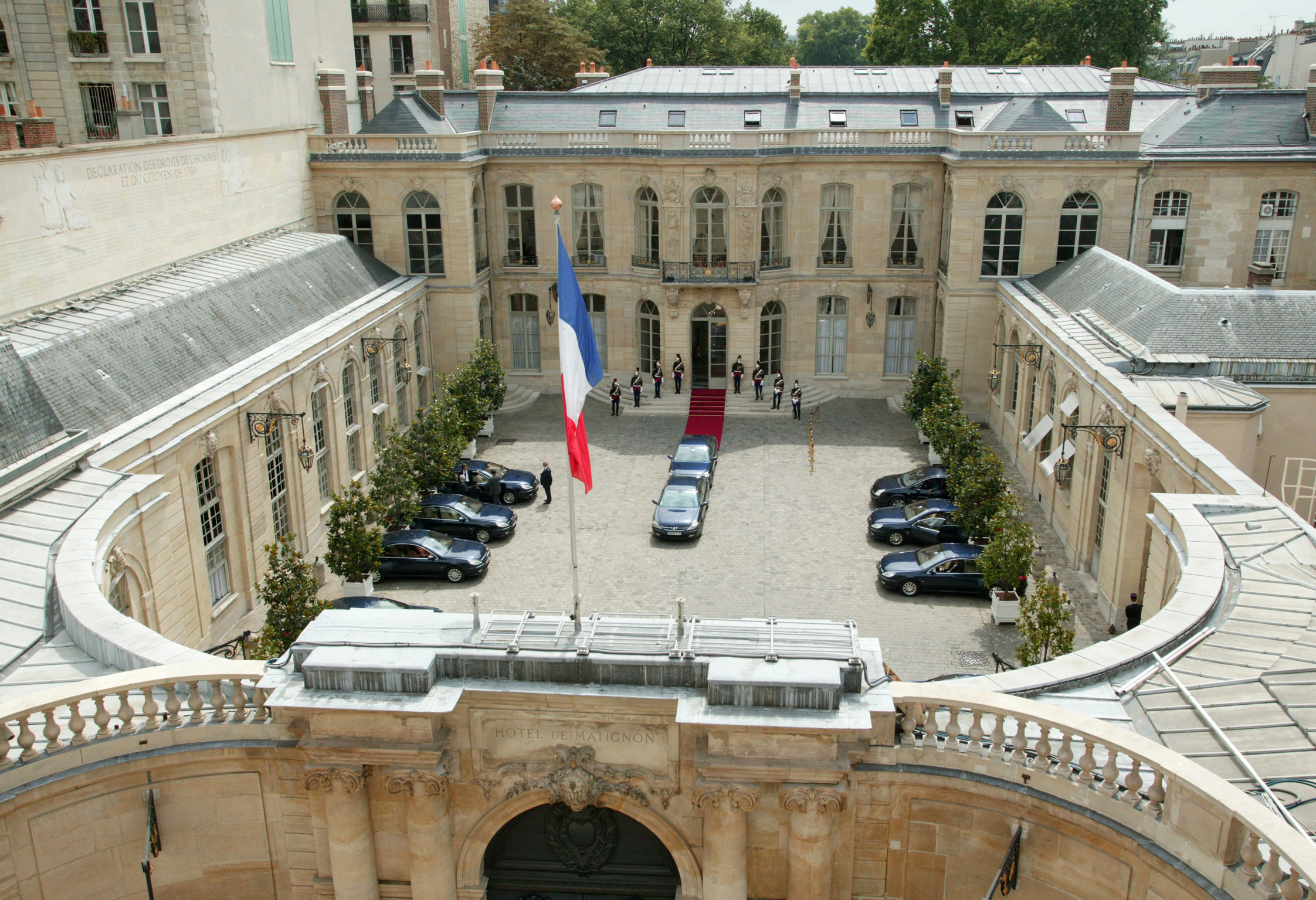
- Main façade and grande cour

General information
- Type: Hôtel particulier
- Architectural style: Baroque
- Location: 57 Rue de Varenne; 7th arrondissement of Paris, France
- Current tenants: Sébastien Lecornu (Prime Minister of France)
- Construction started: 1722
- Completed: 1725

Design and construction
- Architect: Jean Courtonne

The Hôtel Matignon (French: Hôtel de Matignon, pronounced [otɛl d(ə) matiɲɔ̃]) is the official residence of the Prime Minister of France. It is located in the 7th arrondissement of Paris, at 57 Rue de Varenne. The name Matignon is often used as a metonym for the governmental action of the prime minister.

== History ==
=== 17th century ===
In 1649, as part of his plan for the construction of the Hôtel des Invalides, Louis XIV decided to restore the old "Chemin du Bois de la Garenne," which had become the "Rue de Varenne," that linked Saint-Germain-des-Prés, at the western end of Paris, with the marshy terrain chosen as the new building site. Henceforth the "Noble Faubourg" gained a new lease on life, the proximity of Versailles being irresistible for an aristocracy who lived exclusively by and for the Court.

=== 18th century ===
On 30 September 1717, Christian-Louis de Montmorency Luxembourg, Prince of Tigny and Marshal of France, purchased, for the sum of 91 Livres, 2869 toises (30,000 m^{2}) of land along the Rue de Varenne. He was a lover of gardens and intended to create a country park. In 1722, he commissioned a little-known architect, Jean Courtonne, to conceive and construct a mansion. His success in this endeavour won him entry to the Academy of Architecture, where he wrote a much-remarked Treatise on Perspectives (1725). But the expense of the enterprise forced the Prince of Tigny to sell, and it was Jacques Goyon, Count of Matignon who bought the Hôtel, completed in 1725, as a present for his son, the Duke of Valentinois.

Courtonne's design was highly original. Rising from a broad terrace, the main residence, a two-storey building crowned by a balustrade, comprises two suites of rooms. Access from the street is gained by a portico ornamented by columns. This archway reveals the main courtyard, bracketed by two low wings of offices and outbuildings, to the right of which are situated another courtyard, the stables and the kitchens. The façade is broken by three advances. Those to the right and left house the staircases, while the central pavilion displays a magnificent balcony sculpted with lion motifs. Visitors' admiration is drawn by two singular architectural features: the segmented cupola of the entrance hall and, to its right, the first room to have been originally designed for dining. The façade seen from the garden runs the entire length of the buildings, concealing the main courtyard and the servants' yard. Although the design results in a slight imbalance in the natural disposition of the mansion, it respects the placement of a central pavilion with three panels surmounted by a broken pediment bearing the arms of the owners.

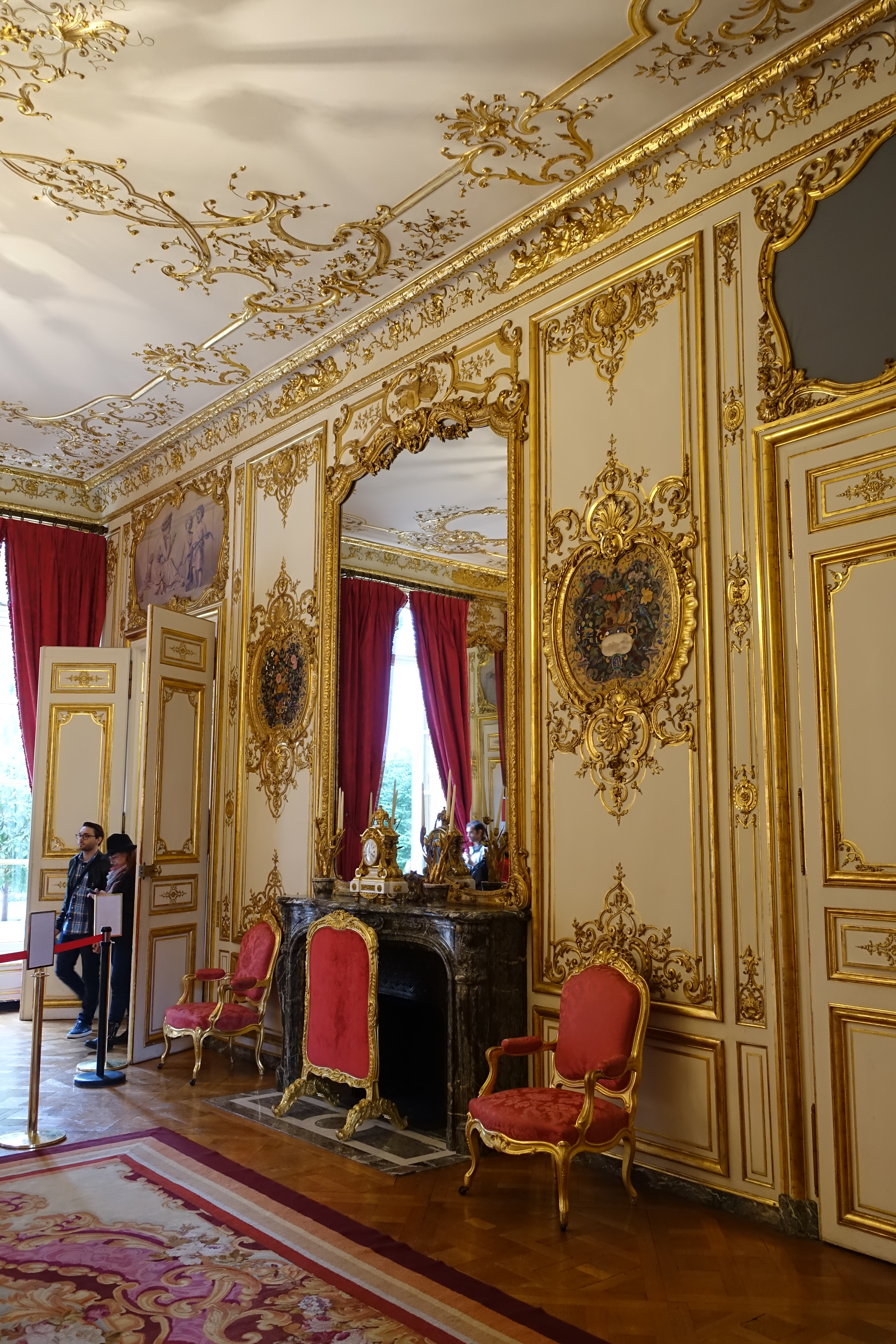
Salon rouge

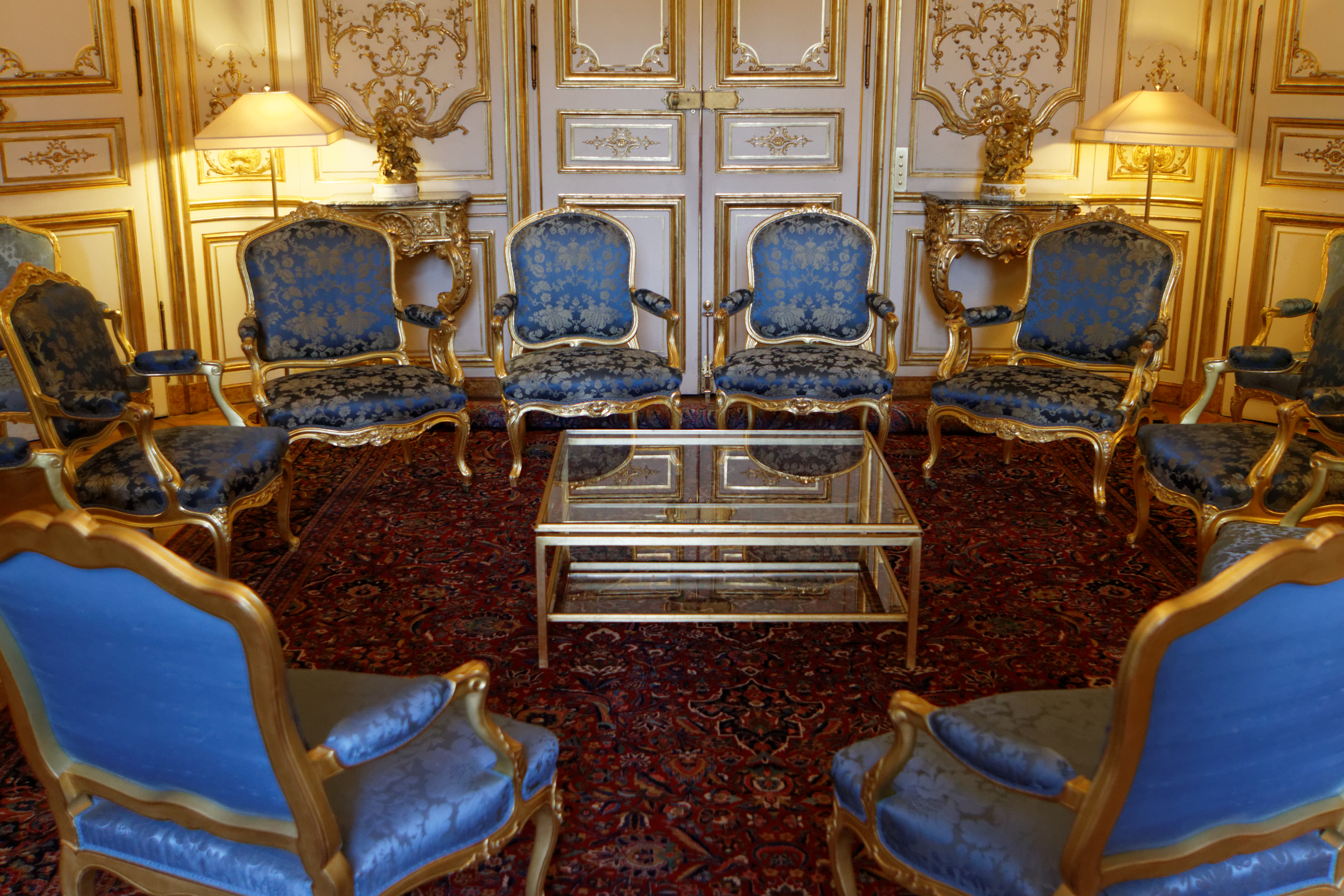
Salon bleu

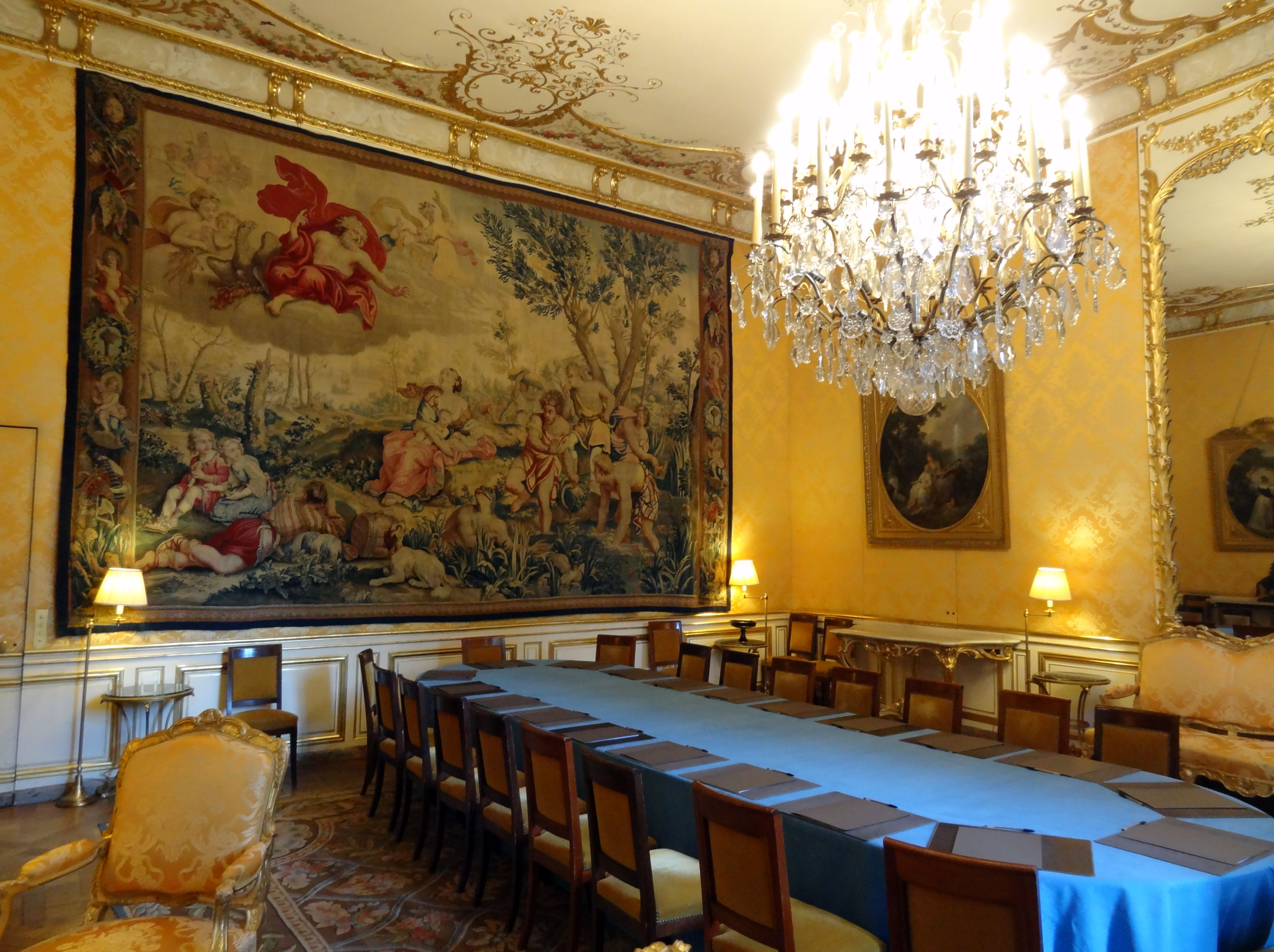
Salon jaune

Its rich interiors made the Hôtel Matignon one of the most elegant and most frequented mansions of Paris. The wood panelling is the work of Michel Lange, who had already decorated the Grand Salon of the Hôtel d'Évreux (today the Ambassadors' Salon of the Élysée Palace). The cornices and the stucco work are by Jean-Martin Pelletier and Jean Herpin. At the time, any "well-dressed" person was authorised by the owners to visit these splendors in their absence.

In 1731, the wife of Jacques de Matignon, daughter of Anthony I Grimaldi, succeeded her father as head of the principality of Monaco. In 1734, their son, Honoré III, mounted the throne. Although he was open to the revolutionary ideas of the time, he was imprisoned on 20 September 1793. At his liberation a year later, he was ruined and his property under seal. His sons obtained restitution, but they were obliged to put the mansion up for sale in 1802.

=== 19th century ===
It was eventually bought by Anne Éléonore Franchi. A professional dancer, she caught the eye, at the Carnival of Venice, of Karl Eugen, Duke of Württemberg, who had three children by her. The Duke died in 1793, and finding herself in Vienna and once more a dancer, she became the mistress of Joseph II. The Empress, Maria Theresa, who had no love for her, had her expelled from Austria. Exiled to the East Indies, she returned to France in the company of the Scottish banker Quentin Crawford. The two of them refurnished the Hôtel, which once again became a festive gathering place for the Ancien Régime society and a hotbed of opposition. Close friends of Joséphine de Beauharnais, the couple grew increasingly open in their criticism of Napoleon after the divorce.

In 1808, the Hôtel Matignon passed into the hands of one of the best-known figures of the first half of the 19th century – Charles Maurice de Talleyrand, Prince of Bénévent and Deputy Great Elector. Four times a week, he gave dinners for 36 guests, prepared in his kitchens by the renowned Boucher. As the shrewd diplomat that he was, he held a great number of balls in honour of the imperial family. In 1811, Napoleon called on Talleyrand to reimburse the city of Hamburg the four millions it had paid him to avoid incorporation into the new French département of the Bouches-de-l'Elbe. As the endeavour had failed, Talleyrand did not consider it necessary to return the sum. He was obliged to put the Hôtel up for sale; the Emperor had it purchased for 1,280 000 Francs, but Talleyrand never reimbursed Hamburg.

In 1815, at the start of the Restoration, Louis XVIII traded the Hôtel Matignon for the Élysée Palace, which belonged to Louise Marie Thérèse Bathilde d'Orléans, sister of Philippe-Égalité, and the separated wife of the Duc de Bourbon. She promptly installed a community of nuns on the premises, charged with praying for the souls of victims of the French Revolution. Her niece inherited the property in 1822 and moved the community to the Rue de Picpus, so that she could rent out the Hôtel.

By the 1830s, the Hotel was owned by Bathilde's niece, Adelaide d'Orleans. She rented it to a visiting wealthy American, Colonel Herman Thorn, who lived there with his large family for over a decade, and renovated it extensively. He was rumoured to have spent 1,000,000 francs on the upgrade.

Following the revolution of 1848, it was planned to place the Hôtel Matignon at the disposal of the head of the executive branch of the new Republic. But if General Cavaignac chose to reside there until December 1848, the Prince President, Napoleon III, preferred the Élysée Palace.

A short time later, the Hôtel was sold to the Duke of Galliera, Raffaele de Ferrari, a member of the Genoese nobility and husband of Marie de Brignole Sale, great-niece to the princess of Monaco. Together, they possessed one of the great fortunes of the time; it is claimed that they owned half of Genoa. Founder of the Crédit Mobilier, Raffaele financed many of the major construction projects of the second half of the 19th century – railroads in Austria, Latin America, Portugal and France (the Paris-Lyon-Marseille line), the digging of the Fréjus tunnel and the Suez Canal, and the Paris buildings designed by Baron Haussmann.

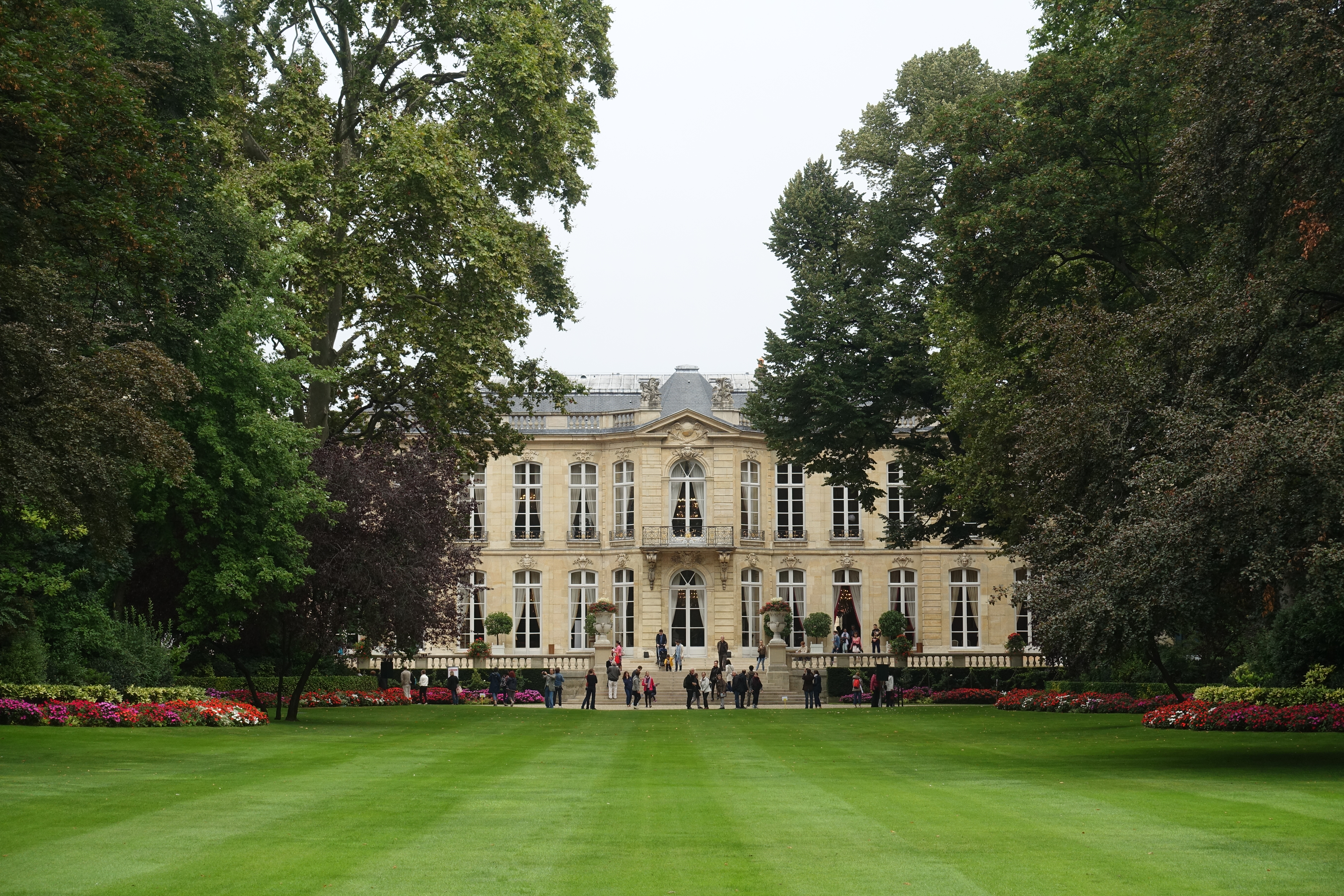
Garden façade

Three years after the fall of Napoleon III in 1870, the Duchess proposed that the Count of Paris take up residence at the Rue de Varenne. He came to occupy the ground floor of the Hôtel Matignon. On 14 May 1886, this was the setting of one of the century's most sumptuous receptions – three thousand guests, the entire aristocracy of France, the diplomatic corps and numerous political figures thronged to celebrate the marriage of Princess Amélie, the Count's daughter, with Carlos, heir to the Portuguese throne. The story goes that, on the day of the reception, the President had a sudden desire to visit the Bois de Boulogne but was unable to leave the Elysée because of the congested traffic. The following day, no doubt alarmed by such a large gathering of monarchists in the capital, the president of the council, Charles de Freycinet, called for a law exiling pretenders to the French throne. The next week, the legislation was passed.

The Duchess of Galliera was disenchanted and quit Paris, leaving her mansion to the Austro-Hungarian Emperor, who made it his embassy in France. But the First World War found the two countries on opposite sides and, confiscated in 1919, the Hôtel Matignon was declared "enemy property". On 21 November 1922, after prolonged negotiations, France once more assumed ownership. During World War I, the Hôtel was also the place where the philatelic collection of Philipp von Ferrary (the most valuable stamp collection ever assembled) was deposited when its owner, the son of the Duke of Galliera and an Austrian citizen, had to flee France in 1917. The collection was later broken up and sold by the French government after the war, as war reparations. In 1923, the Hôtel Matignon was designated as a historical monument by the state.

== Home of the head of government ==
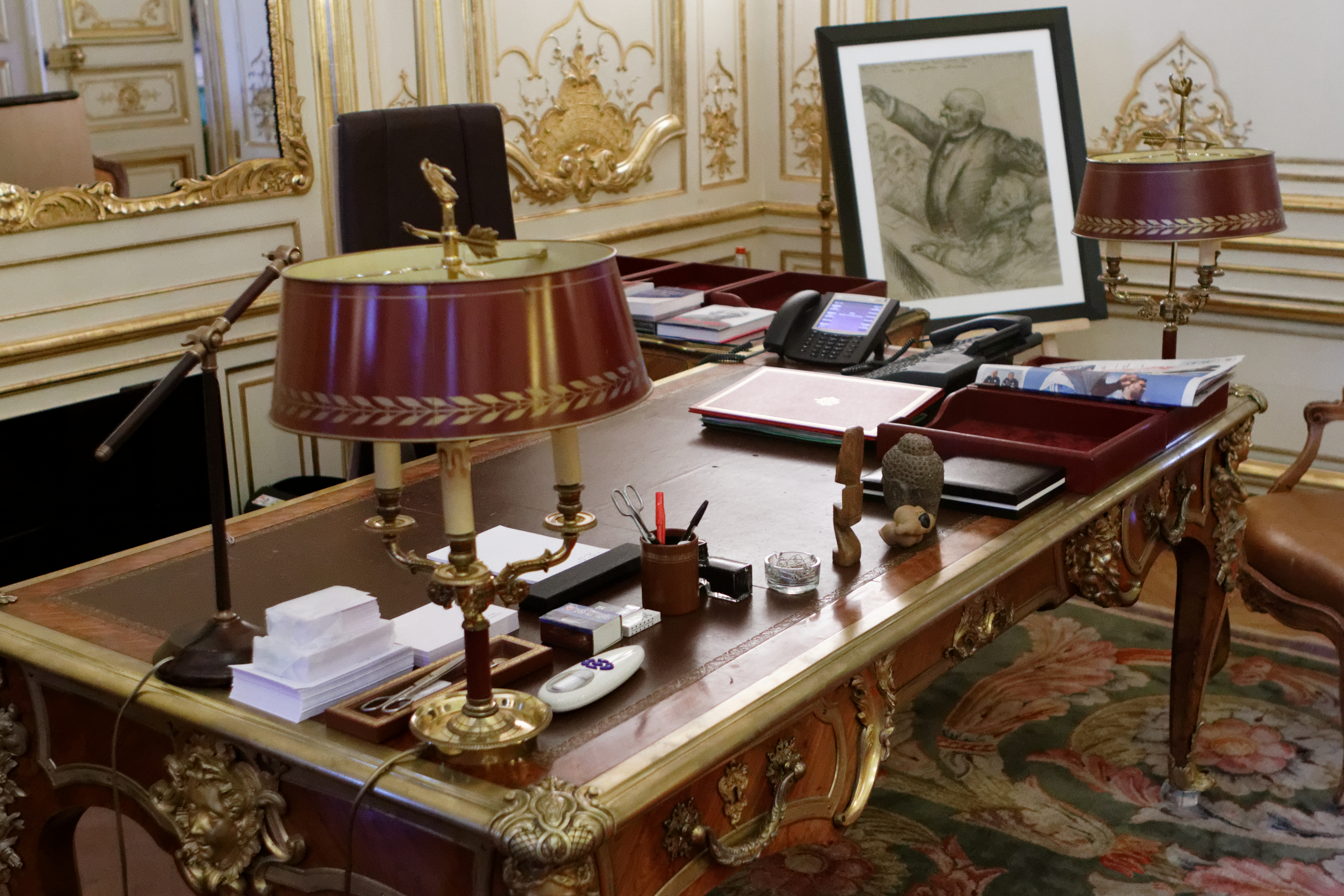
Prime minister's desk

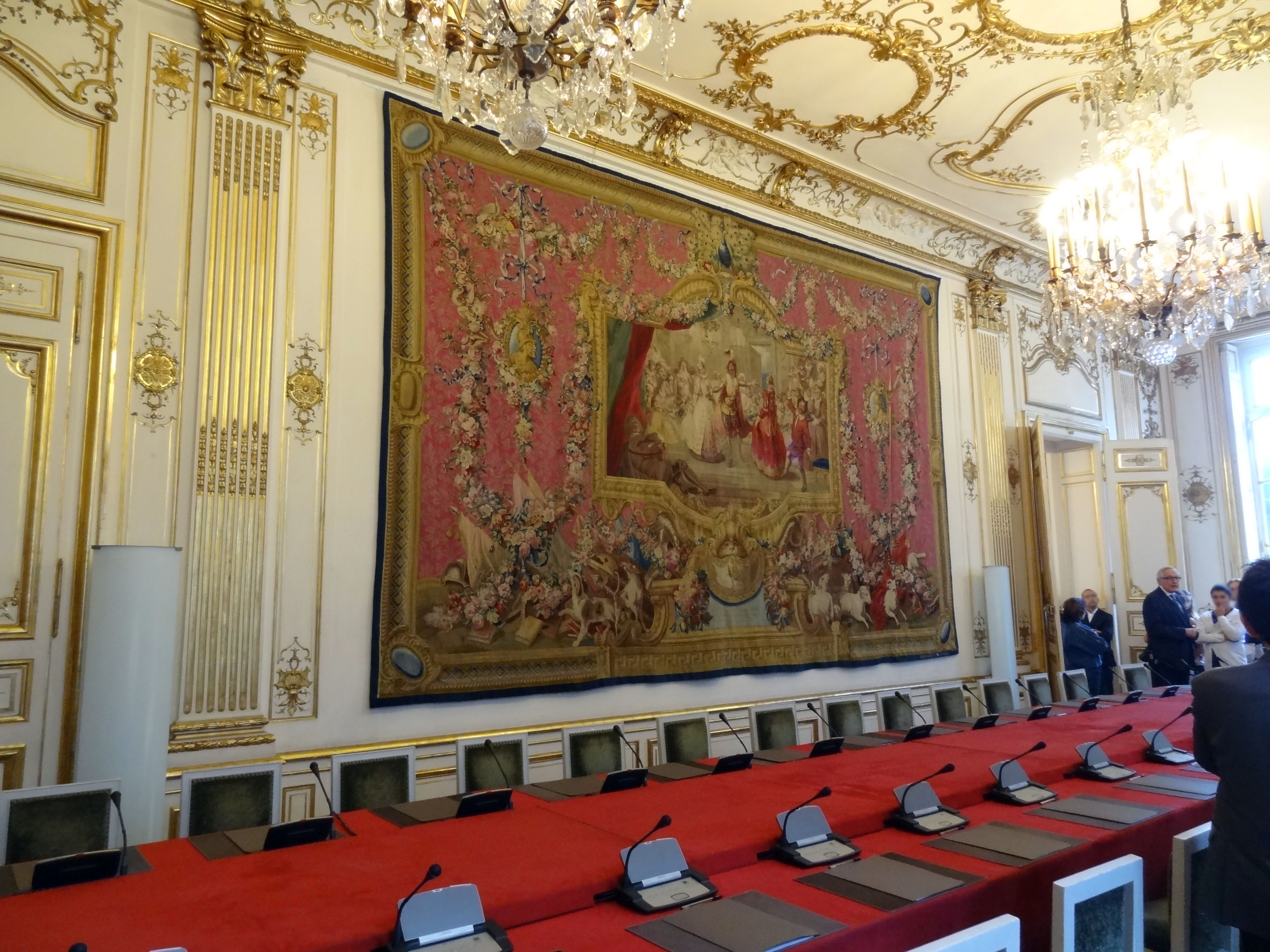
Grand cabinet

There were plans to turn the mansion into a museum – the property was to be subdivided and individual dwellings built, including the adjacent mansion built by the architect Jean Walter in 1924. However, Gaston Doumergue learned of the plans and decided to make it the headquarters of the President of the Council of Ministers (Président du Conseil), as the position of head of government was known under the Third Republic. The architect Paul Bigot took the necessary steps and, in 1935, Pierre Étienne Flandin became the first new occupant.

In 1936, the "Matignon Accords" were signed between Léon Blum and the leaders of the spring 1936 strikes, introducing the 40-hour work week and paid vacations.

Édouard Daladier, prime minister at the start of the Second World War, did not leave his apartment near the Arc de Triomphe and worked at the War Ministry. During the war the government moved to the city of Vichy, but on 21 August 1944, it was in Paris that the resistance leader Yvon Morandat and his future wife Claire seized the "Government Mansion", the Hôtel Matignon. In their haste they even confused Avenue Matignon, located on the Right Bank of the Seine, with the Hôtel Matignon, situated on the Left Bank.

It was there that, on 25 August, General Charles de Gaulle convened the "Provisory Council of the Republic". Subsequent presidents of the council followed his example and, his return in 1958, like the new republic, changed nothing more at Matignon than the occupant's name, which, instead of president of the council, became prime minister.

== Miscellaneous ==
- Several important agreements were signed here:
  - 1936 Matignon Accords between the French employers' union and the Confédération Générale du Travail workers' union, following from the accession of the Front Populaire to power. They guaranteed trade union membership and negotiating rights, a 40-hour working week and paid workers' holidays.
  - 1988 Matignon Agreements with respect to New Caledonia. They called for increased New Caledonian territorial autonomy between the French government, Kanak independence activists and French settlers.
- The park of the Hôtel comprises three hectares, in comparison with the two hectares of the gardens of the Elysee Palace, and is considered to be the largest non-public garden in Paris.

== See also ==
- Élysée Palace (official residence of the French president)
- Hôtel de Marigny (state guest house of the French government)
