= Marie of Lorraine =

Princess of Monaco from 1701 to 1724

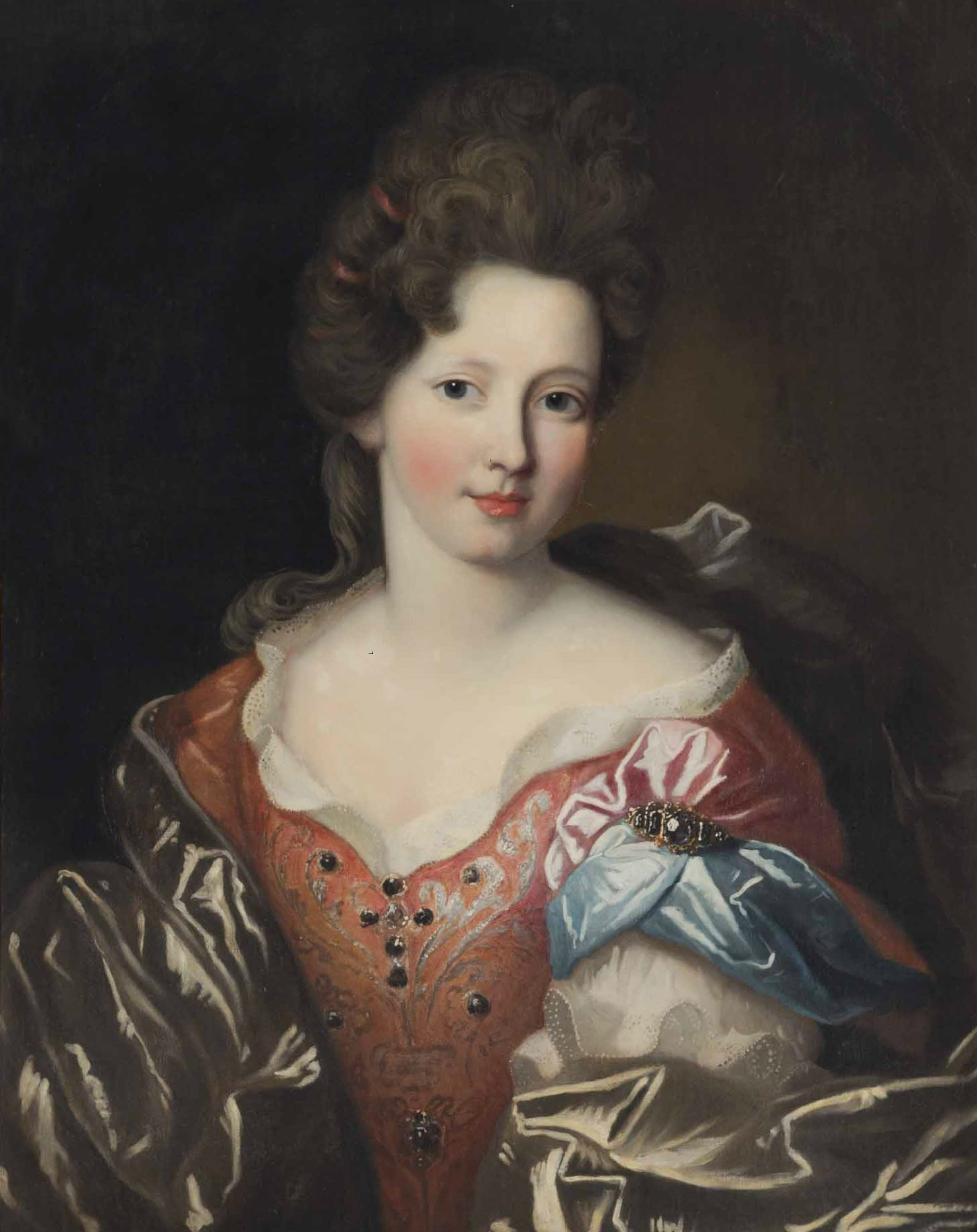
- Marie in 1693

Princess consort of Monaco
- Tenure: 3 January 1701 – 30 October 1724
- Born: 12 August 1674; Paris, France
- Died: 30 October 1724 (aged 50); Prince's Palace, Monaco
- Burial: Cathedral of Our Lady Immaculate
- Spouse: Antonio I, Prince of Monaco (m. 1688)
- Issue Detail: Louise Hippolyte, Princess of Monaco; Margherita, Princess of Isenghien
Names
- Marie de Lorraine
- House: Lorraine (by birth); Grimaldi (by marriage)
- Father: Louis of Lorraine, Count of Armagnac
- Mother: Catherine de Neufville

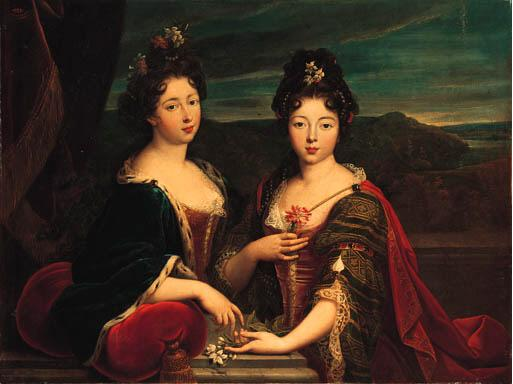
Portrait of Marie de Lorraine (1674-1724) and her sister Charlotte de Lorraine (1678-1757) by Nicolas Fouché

Marie de Lorraine (12 August 1674 – 30 October 1724) was a princess of the House of Lorraine-Guise and Princess of Monaco as consort of Antonio I of Monaco. She was the mother of Louise Hippolyte Grimaldi, the only sovereign Princess of Monaco.

== Mademoiselle d'Armagnac ==
Marie was the ninth of fourteen children born to Louis of Lorraine, Count of Armagnac and his wife, Catherine de Neufville-Villeroy (1639-1707). Her father was a member of the House of Guise, cadet branch of the House of Lorraine, where he held the rank of a prince étranger at the French court. Her mother was a daughter of Nicolas de Neufville, Duke of Villeroy, a marshal of France and the governor of Louis XIV during the latter's youth.

== Duchess of Valentinois ==
In a ceremony conducted by Pierre du Cambout de Coislin in the royal chapel of Versailles, Marie married Antonio Grimaldi, Duke of Valentinois on 13 June 1688. The couple signed their wedding contract on 8 June 1688. As part of the marriage contract, Louis XIV gave the House of Grimaldi the official rank of Foreign Princes at court.

Her husband was the son and heir of Louis I, Prince of Monaco and Catherine Charlotte de Gramont, a former mistress of Louis XIV who had arranged the marriage between Marie and Antonio. Court gossips later stated that the match had been a scheme of Madame de Maintenon, who feared that if she did not remove Marie from court she would become mistress to the king. However Madame de Maintenon wrote that Marie was one of the most "likeable women in the kingdom".

The marriage was not happy. Antonio was described as a brute who had affairs with singers from the Opera when he visited Paris between his military assignments, and Marie responded by finding lovers of her own. Saint-Simon described her in his Memoirs: "the duchesse de Valentinois was a charming young thing... spoilt by her parents' fondness for her and by the attentions of the courtiers who frequented the Lorraine household ... [The beautiful daughters] who were its chief adornment attracted the most glittering young men. Her husband, very sensibly, realised he hadn't the upper hand", and Madame de La Fayette described her as "more of an elegant flirt than all of the ladies of the kingdom put together".

Marie was sent to Monaco by her consort during his military service in 1692, where she was joined by her spouse some time later. There was a great scandal when she claimed that her father in law, the elderly Prince Louis I, had made unwanted sexual advances towards her, possibly as a way to receive permission to return to Paris or to be forced to return to Monaco when she managed to return to Paris. She managed to return to Paris in 1693, where she lived separated from her husband with the support of her mother. In Paris, she participated in high society life and caused a scandal by having a number of lovers, whose images her husband had made in the form of dolls, after which he mock-executed the dolls outside of his palace. After six years, her mother and the king had the couple reunite with the purpose of reproducing an heir, and the couple returned to Monaco in 1697.

After it was clear that Marie was not going to give birth to a son, her husband began a series of badly concealed affairs. Her husband fathered numerous illegitimate children during the marriage.

== Princess of Monaco ==
At the death of her father-in-law, her husband succeeded to the principality of Monaco in 1701. She lived in Monaco with her consort until 1712 and their relationship was described as unhappy but peaceful. In reality, they lived apart; Antoine in the Giardinetto, a cottage he had built for his lover, Mademoiselle Montespan, and Marie in her pavilion, Mon Desert. Built in 1717, it was located in the Place de la Visitation where the Ministère d'Etat now stands.

Marie spent the last years of her life quietly, frequently returning to the French court. Antonio and Marie came in to conflict over the marriage of their daughter and heir Louise in 1712. Antonio preferred Louise to marry the count de Roye, while Marie preferred the count de de Chatillon and, supported by her family, refused to consent to Antonio's candidate. This resulted in a conflict which lasted for two years and caused the anger of Louis XIV. Marie successfully told her daughter to refuse her father's choice, which resulted in Antonio having Louise imprisoned in a convent. Marie left Monaco and travelled to Paris, where Antonio soon discovered that his plans for their daughter was disliked at the French court, and he was forced to release his daughter from prison and give up his plans to marry her to Roye. Marie managed to get Antonio to agree to marry Louise to count de Matignon by suggesting Matignon through the Duchess de Lude. After the marriage of Louise and Matignon, Marie returned to Monaco. When Antonio found out that it was in fact Marie who had suggested Matignon, the relationship between Marie and Antonio further worsened.

She died on 30 October 1724 at the Prince's Palace in Monaco, having organised the marriages of her two surviving daughters, Louise Hippolyte and Margherita. She was buried at the Saint Nicholas Cathedral in Monaco. Her husband died in 1731 and was succeeded by their daughter Louise Hippolyte Grimaldi who became Princess of Monaco in her own right. She married Jacques Goyon, Count de Matignon and is a direct ancestress of the reigning Prince Albert II of Monaco.

== Issue ==
1. Caterina Charlotte Grimaldi, Mademoiselle de Monaco (7 October 1691 – 18 June 1696) died in infancy.
2. Louise Hippolyte Grimaldi, suo jure Princess of Monaco (10 November 1697 – 29 December 1731) married Jacques Goyon, Count of Matignon.
3. Elisabetta Charlotte Grimaldi, Mademoiselle de Valentinois (3 November 1698 – 25 August 1702) died in infancy.
4. Margherita Camilla Grimaldi, Mademoiselle de Carlades (1 May 1700 – 27 April 1758) married Louis de Gand de Mérode de Montmorency, Prince of Isenghien.
5. Maria Devota Grimaldi, Mademoiselle des Baux (15 March 1702 – 24 October 1703) died in infancy.
6. Maria Paolina Teresa Devota Grimaldi, Mademoiselle de Chabeuil (23 October 1708 – 20 May 1726) died unmarried.

Monegasque royalty
Vacant Title last held by Catherine Charlotte de Gramont	Princess consort of Monaco; 1 January 1701 – 30 October 1724	Vacant Title last held by Jacques I as prince consort
