= Nicolas de Neufville, 1st Duke of Villeroy =

French nobleman and marshal of France (1598–1685)

The Marshal-Duke of Villeroy
- 1st Duke of Villeroy
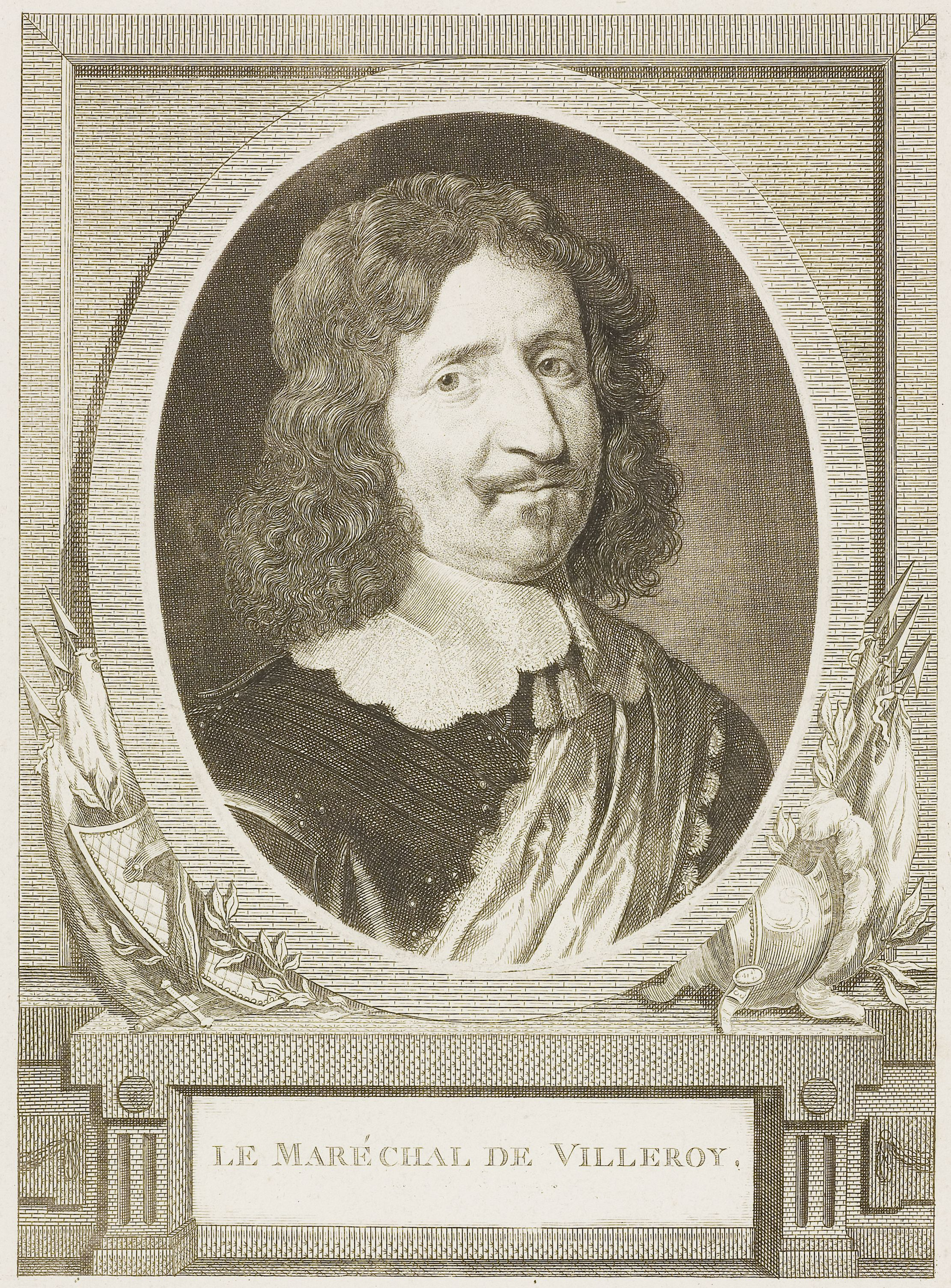
- Print of the 1st Duke of Villeroy.
- Full name: Nicolas de Neufville
- Born: 14 October 1598; France
- Died: 28 November 1685 (aged 87); Hotel de Villeroy, Paris, France
- Spouse: Madeleine de Blanchefort (11 July 1617)
- Issue: Charles, Marquis of Alincourt; François, Duke of Villeroy; Françoise, Marquise o Hauterive; Catherine, Countess of Armagnac
- Father: Charles de Neufville
- Mother: Jacqueline de Harlay

Nicolas de Neufville, 1st Duke of Villeroy (14 October 1598 – 28 November 1685) was a French nobleman and marshal. He was marquis then (from 1651) 1st duke of Villeroy and (from 1663) peer of France, marquis d'Alincourt and lord of Magny, and acted as governor of the young Louis XIV. His son François succeeded him as duke. He was the lover of Catherine-Charlotte de Gramont.

== Life ==
He was the son of Charles de Neufville (1566–1642), Marquis of Villeroy and of Alincourt, and his second wife, Jacqueline de Harlay. His grandfather Nicolas de Neufville served as a secretary of state under Charles IX, Henry III, Henry IV, and Louis XIII.

Nicolas de Neufville studied at the court of Louis XIII as an enfant d’honneur. In 1615, he was made governor of the Lyonnais under his father's supervision – an effective governor, he served in that post until his father's death in 1642. He served in Italy with Lesdiguières and was promoted to marshal of France on 20 October 1646 thanks to being the protégé of cardinal Jules Mazarin.

In March 1646, the queen-mother made marshal de Villeroy governor of Louis XIV, under Mazarin's authority chosen as "surintendent for the government and conduct of the king". It is difficult to attribute him any good or bad influence in the young king's education. He was made duke of Villeroy in September 1651 and admitted to the peerage of France in 1663. He served as Grand Master of France at Louis XIV's coronation and was made a knight of the Order of the Holy Spirit on 31 December 1661. Louis XIV also made him head of the Conseil royal des finances in 1661, a role (of particular importance at the time of the suppression of the surintendance des finances, but becoming largely honorific) he held until his death.

== Hotel de Villeroy ==
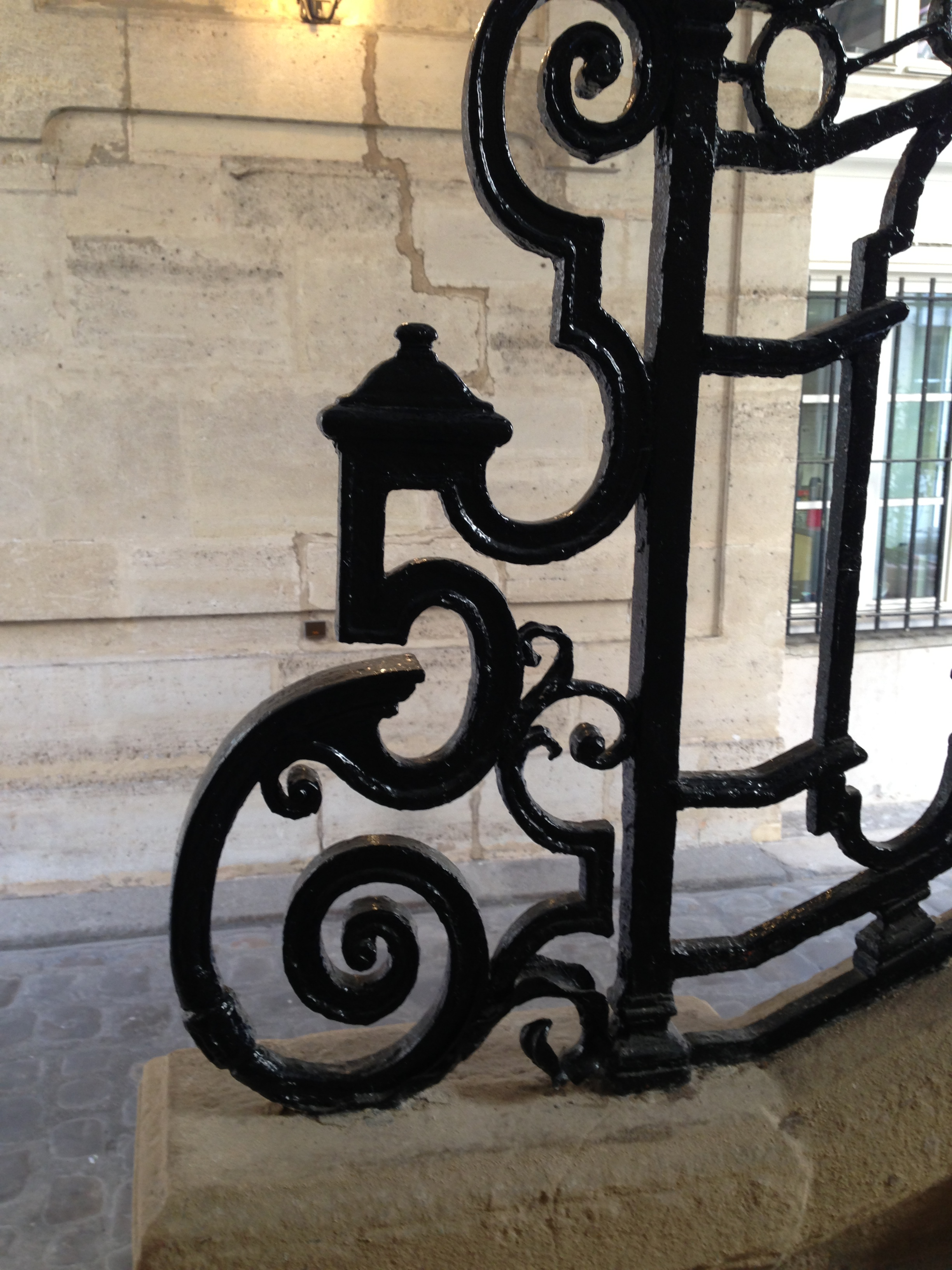
Detail of a number 5 symbol (for Nicolas V) featured at the bottom of the lower railing of the grand staircase of the Hotel de Villeroy.

In 1640 Nicolas de Villeroy built a hôtel particulier on 34 rue des Bourdonnais in the center of Paris in the district of les Halles. The House was built on the grounds of a former mansion already belonging to the Villeroy family since 1370. It has a second entrance from 9 rue des Dechargeurs The beautiful courtyard of the building was frequently visited by the young King Louis XIV who lived in the nearby Palais Royal and played there as a child with his brother Philippe of France. The Hotel de Villeroy still exists today, and in 1984 it was protected as a historic monument. Part of it is today used by the International Exposition center Cremerie de Paris which hosted in June 2012 the Nike Barber Shop. The Barber Shop was the centre of the advertisement campaign of the US company Nike, Inc. Information tours are organised every month giving the public the possibility to discover the staircase and the courtyard of the Hotel de Villeroy.

== Marriage ==
Nicolas married Madeleine de Blanchefort on 11 July 1617 and they had four children.

== Children ==
1. Charles de Neufville, Marquis of Alincourt (died 1645)
2. François de Neufville (1644–1730) Duke of Villeroy married Marguerite Marie de Cossé.
3. Françoise de Neufville (died 1701) married (1) Juist, Count of Tournon then (2) Henri, Duke of Chaulnes then (3) Jean Vignier, Marquis of Hauterive.
4. Catherine de Neufville (1639–1707) married Louis, Count of Armagnac.

== Arms ==
Coat of arms of Nicolas de Neufville, 1st Duke of Villeroy
Escutcheon D'azur au chevron d'or, accompagné de trois croisettes ancrées du même.
