= Antonio I of Monaco =

Prince of Monaco from 1701 to 1731

Antonio I
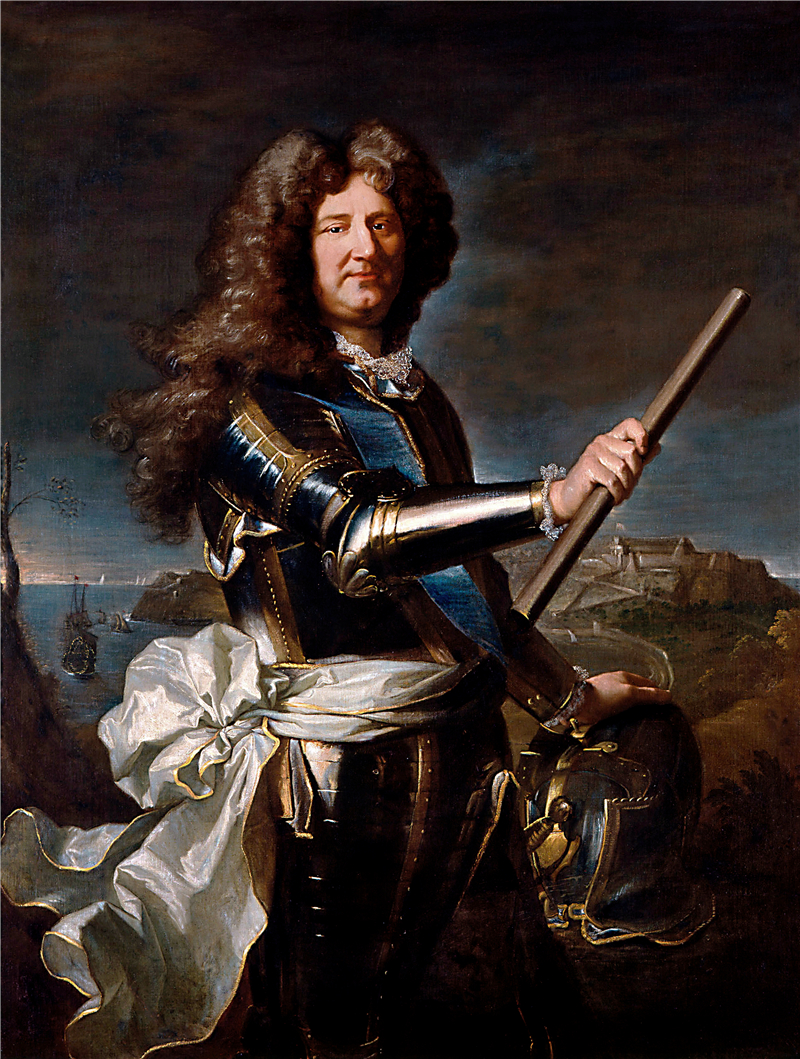
- Portrait by Hyacinthe Rigaud, c. 1706

Prince of Monaco
- Reign: 3 January 1701 – 20 February 1731
- Predecessor: Louis I
- Successor: Louise Hippolyte
- Born: 25 January 1661
- Died: 20 February 1731 (aged 70)
- Spouse: Marie of Lorraine (m. 1688; died 1724)
- Issue Detail: Antoine, Governor-General of Monaco; Louise Hippolyte, Princess of Monaco
Names
- French: Antoine
- House: Grimaldi
- Father: Louis I, Prince of Monaco
- Mother: Catherine Charlotte de Gramont
- Religion: Roman Catholic

Antonio I (French: Antoine 25 January 1661 – 20 February 1731) was the sovereign Prince of Monaco from 1701 to 1731.

== Early life ==
Antonio was the elder son of Louis I of Monaco and Catherine Charlotte de Gramont.

== Career ==
In 1683, Antonio was named lieutenant in the Régiment du Roi Infanterie. In 1684, he was named colonel of the regiment of Soissonois. During the Nine Years War he was present at the Battle of Philippsburg (1688), the Battle of Fleurus (1690), the Siege of Mons (1691), and the Siege of Namur (1692).

On 21 August 1702, Antonio took the oath to King Louis XIV of France in the Parlement on account of being Duke of Valentinois and a Peer of France. He was made a knight of the French royal orders in 1724.

He "completed the fortifications of the Rock of Monaco, constructed the Oreillon and the Fort Antoine." Finally, he formed a "brilliant Court in his palace." He constructed the Rampe Major in 1714; this was an improved road connecting La Condamine to the "platform of the peninsula." The Oreillon tower commanding the ramp leading to the Palais Princier was constructed between 1707 and 1708.

== Personal life ==
Royal Monogram of Prince Antonio I of Monaco

On 13 June 1688, Antonio married Marie de Lorraine, "Mademoiselle d'Armagnac" (1674–1724), a daughter of Louis, Count of Armagnac. Together, they had six daughters, of whom only three survived infancy:

- Caterina Charlotte (1691–1696), "Mademoiselle de Monaco", died in early childhood.
- Louise Hippolyte (1697–1731), successor of her father.
- Elisabetta Charlotte (1698–1702), "Mademoiselle de Valentinois", died in childhood.
- Margherita Camilla (1700–1758), "Mademoiselle de Carlades"; who married Louis de Gand-Vilain, Prince of Isenghien and Marshal of France, in 1720.
- Maria Devota (1702–1703), "Mademoiselle des Baux", died in infancy.
- Maria Paolina Theresa Devota (1708–1726), "Mademoiselle de Chabreuil", who died unmarried at 18.

Antonio also had a number of illegitimate children:

- with Elisabeth Durfort (a dancer)
  - Antoine Grimaldi (1697–1784), known as the Chevalier de Grimaldi
- with Victoire Vertu (dancer at the Paris opera)
  - Antoinette Grimaldi (1699–?), called mademoiselle de Saint-Rémy
- with an unidentified Provençal lady
  - Louise Marie Thérèse Grimaldi (1705–1723)

== Ancestors ==
Ancestors of Antonio I of Monaco

8. Honoré II, Prince of Monaco
4. Ercole of Monaco
9. Ippolita Trivulzio
2. Louis I, Prince of Monaco
10. Luca Spinola, signore di Molfetta
5. Maria Aurelia Spinola
11. Pellina Spinola
1. Antonio I, Prince of Monaco
12. Antoine, Duke de Gramont
6. Antoine, Duke of Gramont
13. Louise de Roquelaure
3. Catherine Charlotte de Gramont
14. Hector de Chivré, seigneur du Plessis
7. Françoise Marguerite du Plessis de Chivré
15. Marie de Connan

Preceded by Louis I	Sovereign Prince of Monaco; 1701–1731	Succeeded by Louise Hippolyte
Preceded by Louis I	Duke of Valentinois; 1701–1731	Extinct
