= Alfredo Oriani =

Italian writer

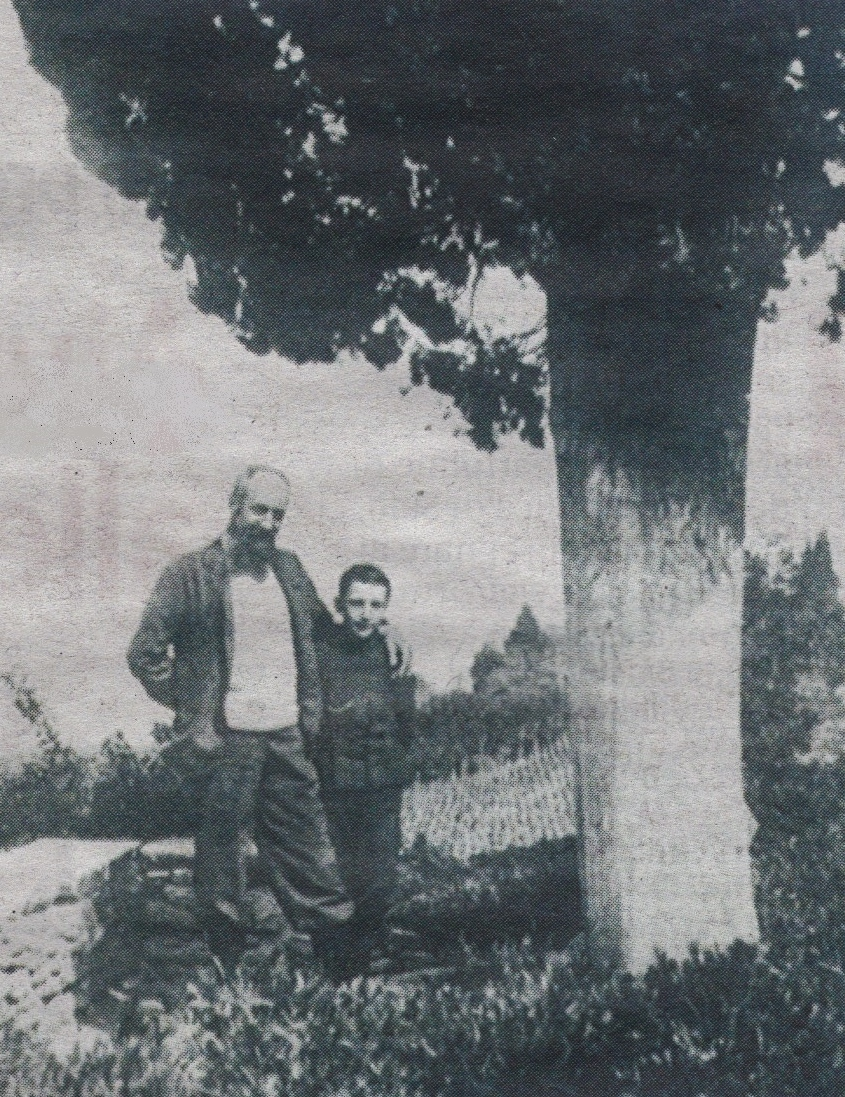
- Alfredo Oriani with his son Ugo (1891)
- Born: 22 August 1852; Faenza, Kingdom of Italy
- Died: 18 October 1909 (aged 57); Casola Valsenio, Kingdom of Italy
- Education: University of Naples Federico II
- Occupations: author; writer; social critic; historian
- Partner: Giacomina Cavallari
- Children: Ugo Oriani
- Parent(s): Luigi Oriani and Clementina Oriani (née Bertoni)
- Writing career
- Pen name: Ottone di Banzole
- Years active: 1876–1909
- Genres: novel; essay
- Notable works: La lotta politica in Italia; La rivolta ideale
- Movements: Romanticism; Verismo; Decadent movement

Alfredo Oriani (Italian: [alˈfreːdo oˈrjaːni]; 22 August 1852 in Faenza – 18 October 1909 in Casola Valsenio) was an Italian author, writer and social critic. He is often considered a precursor of Fascism, and in 1940 his books were placed on the Index Librorum Prohibitorum of the Catholic Church.

== Biography ==
Alfredo Oriani was born on 22 August 1852 in Faenza (Ravenna), the youngest of three children. His father Luigi Oriani, belonged to the lower landed gentry. He studied law at the Sapienza University of Rome in Rome and at the University of Naples where he received his law degree in 1872. He never practiced, however, but retired to his family's estate to devote most of his life to his writing. Oriani spent most of his adult life writing in seclusion in his family country house. In 1876, he published his first work, Memorie inutili (1876), a collection of auto-biographical tales deeply influenced by the Scapigliatura. Oriani never married. In 1881 he fathered an illegitimate child by the family maid. An admirer of Crispi, Oriani disdained bourgeois moderatism, and pleaded for a national revival based on the same spirit of fervent patriotism as had created Italy. In 1892 he unsuccessfully ran for the Italian Parliament. In the last decade of his life he turned to the theatre, enjoying a certain success with the tragedy L'invincibile (1902). He died on 18 October 1909 in his residence in Casola Valsenio, at the age of only 57.

=== Novels ===
Oriani began his career as a novelist in the last two decades of the nineteenth century. He published his first collection of short stories, Memorie inutili (Useless Memoirs), under the pen name of Ottone di Banzole, 1876. It was followed in 1877 by Al di là (Beyond), in 1879 by Gramigna (Couchgrass, or Weed), in 1881 by No, in 1883 by Quartetto, then Sullo Scoglio e altri racconti (On the Reef and Other Tales). They are all dark, gloomy narratives, emotional, shaken by an anarchical drive of revolt against society.

A Romanticist at first, he later adhered to verismo, to which such novels as Gelosia (1894), Vortice (1899), and Olocausto (1902) belong. Many of Oriani's dreams and ideals are found in what is usually considered his best novel, La Disfatta (1896). It is the drama of Professor De Nittis, who has spent all his life studying and then finally marries Bice, who gives him a son. De Nittis sees his son and his friends die, does not attain glory, and thinks disconsolately of the life that remains to be lived; his defeat consists in the awareness that his life is essentially empty, without echo.

=== Historical works ===
Of Oriani's historical and critical works best remembered are Fino a Dogali (1889), La lotta politica in Italia (1892), and La rivolta ideale (1908). The first deals with Italy's mission in Africa (Dogali was the scene of an Italian disaster in that continent). The second concerns the history of the struggle for Italian unity from the Middle Ages in relation to the history of Europe. It contains glowing pages, among them the one written for the Italian entry into Rome:

A great nation had been added to Europe; the most glorious of world cities became again one of its civil capitals. If in its own revolution Italy could not have become a republic and proclaim to Rome the superiority of civil thought over religious thought, placing itself thus in the vanguard of Latin races, nevertheless, the establishment of unity and the fall of the temporal power gave Italy a greater significance than the unity of the new German Empire. The principles of nationality and of popular sovereignty had triumphed in Italy better than in Germany where ancient feudal orders and the new military set-up still painfully marred modern life.

— Afredo Oriani (1969). Piergiovanni Permoli (ed.). La lotta politica in Italia. Bologna: Cappelli. p. 359

In La rivolta ideale (The Ideal Revolt) published in 1908, Oriani tried to resurrect the lost dimension of a heroic and popular Risorgimento. Oriani tended to examine the history of modern Italy by means of heroic figures, which lead Antonio Gramsci to refer to his historiographical "titanism". He envisioned a new aristocracy to lead the nation and the people to fully realize their historical destiny and endorsed the need of idealism against nineteenth-century positivism. He lashed against "democracy's plebeian materialism", and wished for the arrival of a charismatic leader who could change Italy for good.

== Posthumous fame ==
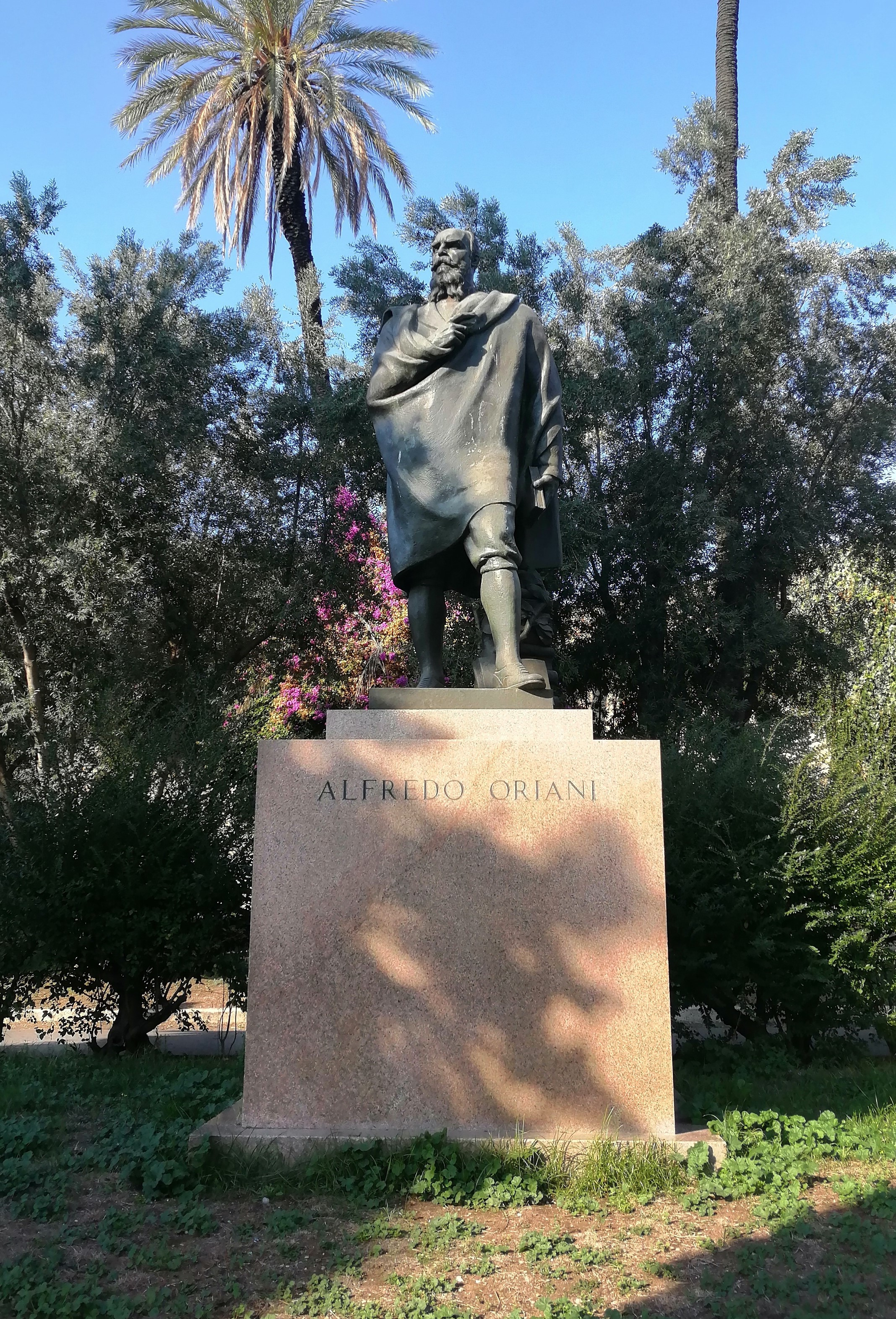
Statue of Alfredo Oriani on the Oppian Hill, Rome

Oriani only enjoyed a posthumous fame thanks to his late discovery by Benedetto Croce. La Disfatta (1896), regarded as the best of his novels, received warm praise from Croce, but the revival of interest in Oriani which came about after his death is due principally to the character of his historical and social works – like his 1892 La lotta politica in Italia. Oriani exerted a major influence on Italian politics (as well as an indirect impact on the historiography of the time), which culminated in his being labeled a precursor of Fascism. Oriani's political thinking matured under Giuseppe Mazzini's influence and is reflected in his political essays that were primarily responsible for his belated status with Fascism. According to Israeli historian Meir Michaelis "Oriani translated Mazzini's concept of 'mission' into the language of imperialism". In Fino a Dogali (As Far as Dogali, 1889), for instance, he offered a justification of Italy's expansion into Africa, stressing the civilizing mission of Italy in the world. La lotta politica in Italia (The political struggle in Italy, 1892) was a lively account of the causes of Italian political decadence from the fall of the Western Roman Empire to the Risorgimento, which deplored internal discord and called on the Italian nation to resume its civilizing mission in the world by building a modern colonial empire. This work is considered the prototype of modern revisionism of Risorgimento, as opposite to apologetic historiography of Savoy. Oriani put into question the outcome of the events of the Risorgimento. He criticized the "royal conquest" as a unilateral action to create a new state, assuming that without the support of a strong democratic movement, it would prove to be weak in its foundations.

In the cultural climate of the first decades of the twentieth century, La lotta politica in Italia seemed to offer to many intellectuals an answer to the restlessness of those times and to the expectations towards a different Italy from the Giolitti's one. For over a decade the book was debated by all the sectors of the Italian culture: famous characters like Amendola, Prezzolini, Gentile, appreciated its passionate and polemic structure. According to the futurist writer Giovanni Papini, Oriani's work compared favourably with those of Thomas Carlyle, Jules Michelet and Giuseppe Ferrari. Oriani's ideas influenced the work of the radical intellectual Piero Gobetti, especially his collection of essays Risorgimento without heroes (Risorgimento senza eroi, 1926), an harsh criticism of the liberal ruling class of the post-Unitarian period. Oriani was also appreciated by leftist and anti-Fascist Antonio Gramsci, who wrote about him in his Prison Notebooks. Gramsci recognised Oriani as the "most honest and impassioned" advocate of "Italian national-popular grandeur" among the older generation of intellectuals.

Oriani's fame quickly spread beyond Italy's borders. Georges Sorel, who admired Oriani as a romantic novelist and profound social philosopher, dedicated to him an essay entitled "La rivolta ideale" (L'Indépendance, 15 April 1912). Sorel believed that Oriani combined an aesthetic intuition with philosophic insight. His work, Sorel noted, "[a] été assez clairvoyant pour prévoir le désastre des scientistes et [a] contribué à maintenir la noble tradition hégélienne". ("[has] been rather clairvoyant to predict the disaster of scientists and [has] contributed to maintaining the noble Hegelian tradition.") Benjamin Crémieux considered Oriani «le seul écrivain politique dont l’influence ait été en Italie vraiment vivificante».

== Influence and legacy ==
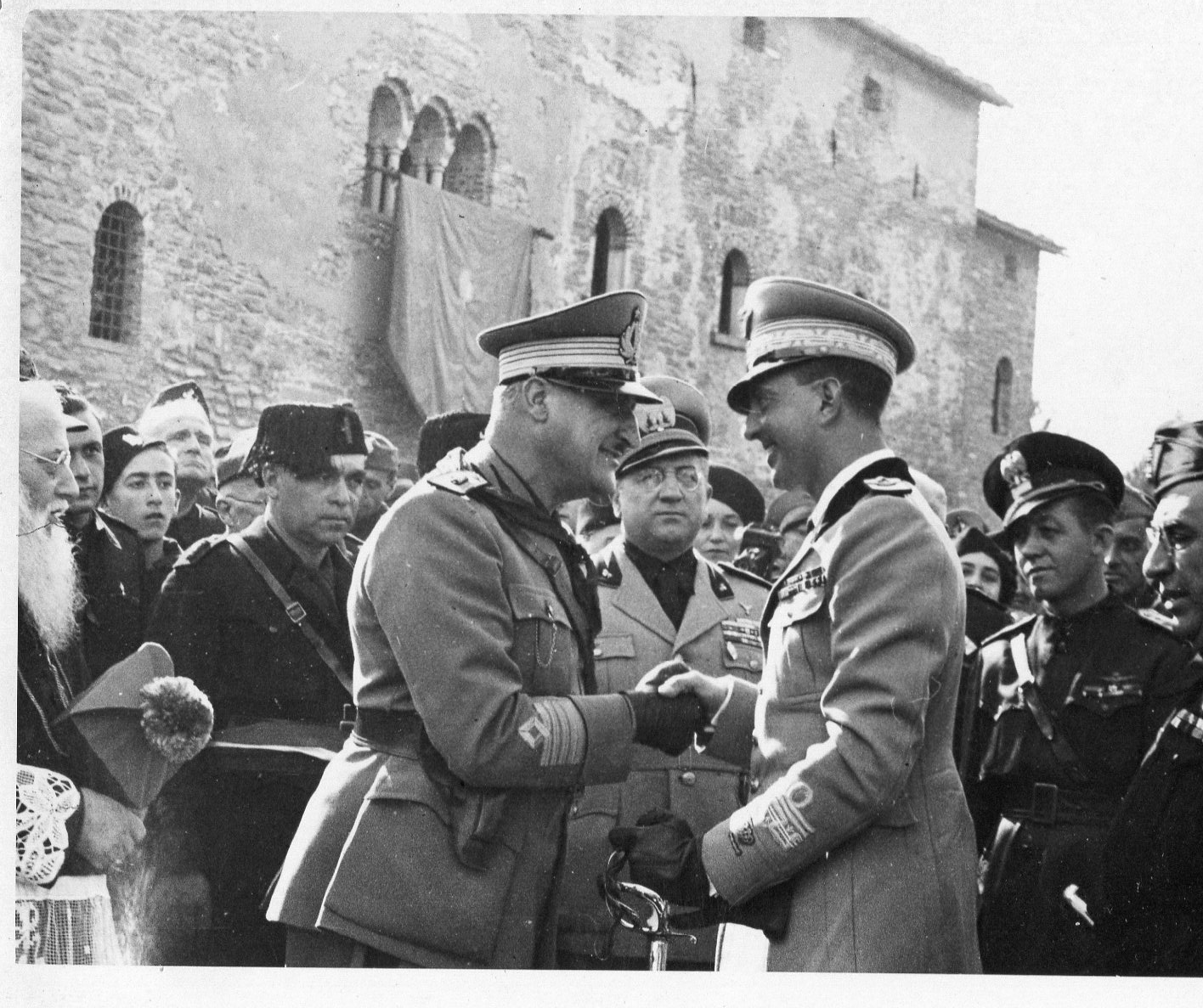
Fascist leader Eugenio Coselschi shaking hands with Crown Prince Umberto di Savoia during a celebration in honour of Alfredo Oriani at Casola Valsenio (22 October 1938)

Calling for a renewal of the Italian state and a rebirth of ancient Roman imperialism it is no surprise that the nationalists should choose Oriani as their literary hero. 'In Oriani', wrote the future fascist leader Dino Grandi, 'my generation found its anxieties, its feelings, its contradictions, its aspirations and its instincts confirmed, and above all explained and clarified.' Protagonists of nationalism such as Corradini and Federzoni opened the way to the future fascist interpretation of Oriani. Benito Mussolini considered Oriani one of the inspirers of Fascism for his criticism of the late 19th-century bourgeois culture. The posthumous edition of all his works was edited by Mussolini in person (1923–1933). Il Cardello, the old residence of Oriani, who is buried in the surrounding park, became a popular visiting place in Fascist Italy. Mussolini led the 'Marcia al Cardello' here in 1924 and returned on numerous occasions. The most telling testimony to what the place became is the mausoleum (built in 1923–24 by Giulio Arata), on the top of which stands the writer's tomb.

After the fall of Fascism, Oriani was on trial too. A national interest came up only for the centenary of his birth (1952) and the fiftieth anniversary of his death (1959), when the writer and his opera were set free from fascist appropriation. This operation brought a reversed reading: Oriani, especially through La lotta politica in Italia (that came out in 1956 in a valid critical edition by Alberto Maria Ghisalberti), ended up to be pointed as a «forerunner» – this time – of the Republic, and his democratic liberal opinions and his liking to Garibaldi and Mazzini were underlined.

Starting from the 1960s Oriani's figure and historical work have never been so popular as during the previous decades, because in the meanwhile the historiographical discussion on the Risorgimento simply had been changed. That produced however, since Walter Maturi's reassessment of the writer's legacy, a more detached analysis of Oriani's historical and literary work. In particular the writings published during the 1980s have been studying Oriani's production within the cultural and political contest of his time, where he appears as a significant voice of the passage from nationalism inspired by the Risorgimento to a new and more aggressive nationalism that imposed itself at the beginning of the century.

Today, Oriani's house – national monument – is used as a writer's house-museum; the building is owned by the Fondazione Casa di Oriani.

== Works ==
- Memorie inutili (1876)
- Al di là (1877)
- Monotonie – versi di Ottone di Banzole (1878)
- Gramigne (1879)
- No (1881)
- Quartetto (1883)
- Matrimonio (1886)
- Fino a Dogali (1889)
- La lotta politica in Italia (1892)
- Il nemico (1894)
- Gelosia (1894)
- La Disfatta (1896)
- Vortice (1899)
- Olocausto (1902)
- La Bicicletta (1902)
- Oro incenso e mirra (1904)
- La rivolta ideale (1908)

=== Collected works ===
- Opera omnia, edited by Benito Mussolini, 30 vols., Bologna: Cappelli, 1923–1933.
