= Jacques Gélu =

Medieval archbishop

Jacques Gélu (c. 1370 – 7 September 1432) was the archbishop of Tours from 1414 until 1427 and then archbishop of Embrun from 1427 until his death.

A subject of the Holy Roman Empire, Gélu received a legal education in France and entered the service of the kings of France and the dauphins of Viennois. After King Charles VI arranged his election as archbishop of Tours, he sent him to the Council of Constance, where he was part of the French delegation between 1414 and 1418 and took part in the papal election of 1417.

In the Armagnac–Burgundian conflict, Gélu aligned with the Armagnacs. In 1420, he was sent on an embassy to Castile seeking a military alliance against England in the Hundred Years' War. He was a staunch opponent of the Treaty of Troyes between France and England later that year. In 1421, Pope Martin V sent him on an embassy to the Kingdom of Naples to help resolve a succession crisis. In 1427, he agreed to an exchange of dioceses which put him in Embrun and far away from the front lines of the war with England, although he continued to support and advise Charles VII from afar.

Start of Gélu's treatise on Joan of Arc

In 1429, from Embrun, Gélu wrote in defence of Joan of Arc as God's messenger. In 1432, he went to Italy to be recognized as a prince of the Holy Roman Empire by the emperor-elect Sigismund, whom he knew from Constance. His last mission was to negotiate with Pope Eugene IV on Sigismund's behalf.

== Life ==
=== Early life ===
Gélu was born around 1370 in Ivoix in the archdiocese of Trier in the duchy of Luxembourg in the Holy Roman Empire. When he was nine years old, he was sent to the house of Jean de Luxembourg, dean of Ivoix and chancellor of Duke Wenceslaus I. In his fifteen months with the chancellor, he learned German in addition to his native French. Afterwards, he studied at the University of Paris and, briefly, the University of Orléans. Among his teachers at Paris were Jean de Thoisy and Henri Chicot. At Paris, Gélu received his master of arts (maître ès arts) in 1391 and his bachelor of laws (bachelier en décret) in 1395. In 1402, he received his licentiate of laws (licencié ès lois) at Orléans. On 14 December 1402, he was made master of requests of Louis I, Duke of Orléans, who earlier that year acquired Luxembourg in pledge for a loan from King Wenceslaus IV of Bohemia. He incepted as a doctor of both laws at Paris on 29 March 1403.

In October 1403, Gélu was seeking the help of Pope Benedict XIII in acquiring a canonry in the vicinity of Paris. On 26 April 1405, Gélu was elected to the Parlement of Paris, beating out fourteen other candidates. He held the office until his resignation on 24 November 1414. In June 1407, King Charles VI appointed him president of the Delphinal Council. He was in the Dauphiné on business when the Duke of Orléans was assassinated in Paris in November 1407. In 1409, Archbishop Michel Étienne assigned to him a canonry attached to Embrun Cathedral, but he resigned from the council in November. In April–August 1410, he was part of a delegation sent to take possession of Guyenne on behalf of the Dauphin Louis, Duke of Guyenne. In December, Louis made him master of requests in his household. In 1411–1413, Gélu negotiated for the Dauphin the purchase of the counties of Valentinois and Diois from Count Louis II.

=== Archbishop of Tours ===
A page from Gélu's personal copy of the Decretals of Gregory IX and related texts with commentaries

==== Council of Constance ====
Gélu succeeded Ameil du Breuil as archbishop of Tours. He was in Paris on 18 November 1414 when he learned that, at the recommendation of the king and dauphin, he had been proclaimed archbishop by the Council of Constance on 7 November. He was confirmed by Pope John XXIII. Master Jean Girard took possession of the see on his behalf on 22 December. He was consecrated by Gérard de Montaigu on 13 January 1415 in the presence of Charles VI. At the time of his consecration his ecclesiastical rank was subdeacon and, besides his canonry in Embrun, he was a precentor in the church of Vienne.

Charles VI sent Gélu at the head of the French delegation to the Council of Constance, where he arrived on 30 May 1415. He witnessed the execution of Jan Hus on 6 July. He was the leader of the French delegation that accompanied the emperor-elect Sigismund to the Perpignan conference with Benedict XIII in September. He pushed for relocating the Council of Constance to a city less hostile to Benedict and was responsible for informing the council of the outcome of the conference.

On 22 October 1417, he proposed a method for electing a consensus pope, which was adopted by the council on 30 October. Under his proposal, for one time only, delegates from the Christian nations would take part alongside all the cardinals in electing a new pope to end the Great Schism. He was one of the six French delegates to take part in the election of Pope Martin V on 8 November 1417. He himself received eight votes.

==== Royal and papal service ====
On 2 March 1418, Martin V sent Gélu to Paris as apostolic legate "for the affairs of the church and kingdom" of France. On 14 April, Gélu celebrated Mass for the Dauphin, the future Charles VII, who formally recognized the election of Martin V. During the Burgundian coup d'état in Paris on 29 May, Gélu was arrested in his house and imprisoned. He managed to escape the subsequent massacre of Armagnacs, leaving Paris for Tours on 16 June. With Robert de Bracquemont, he represented the Dauphin in negotiations with the Duke John the Fearless of Burgundy at the castle of Vincennes between 5 and 18 September, culminating in the Treaty of Saint-Maur. Shortly afterwards, Gélu informed Duke John V of Brittany that the Dauphin would not ratify the treaty.

In January 1420, Gélu was sent on an embassy to Castile to elicit military aid against England, sailing from La Rochelle. King John II promised to send and finance 20 armed galleys and 60 large nefs for a period of three months under the admiral of Castile, but nothing ultimately came of this. Gélu returned to Tours by land, arriving on 6 June.

On 29 September 1421, Gélu left the archiepiscopal castle in Artannes-sur-Indre where he normally resided for an ad limina visit. Later that year, Martin V appointed him to mediate between Joan II of Naples, Alfonso V of Aragon and Louis III of Anjou. In Naples, he visited the tomb of Vergil. On 22 November 1422, King Charles VII appointed Gélu to a planned embassy that was ultimately cancelled. The following years were relatively quiet for Gélu. He sat on the Conseil du roi in 1425. He unsuccessfully attempted to dissuade Duke John of Brittany from adhering by oath to the Treaty of Troyes, probably in the summer of 1427, for John swore the oath in September.

=== Archbishop of Embrun ===
In 1427, Gélu accepted transfer to the less prestigious and less remunerative archdiocese of Embrun in the Holy Roman Empire. This was, so he says, to escape from "the vicinity of war". According to the later account of Marcellin Fornier, he learned of the vacancy in Embrun created by the death of Michel Étienne when he stopped there on his way to Rome, since he still held the canonry he had acquired in 1409. In Rome, a double transfer was negotiated with Martin V and Philippe de Coëtquis, bishop of Saint-Pol-de-Léon. Gélu was transferred to Embrun and Coëtquis, who was loyal to Charles VII and opposed the duke of Brittany's rapprochement with the English, was moved to Tours. This had taken place by 30 July, when Martin confirmed the exchange.

==== Joan of Arc controversy ====
Gélu returned from Rome to Tours before moving to the archiepiscopal castle of Embrun in Guillestre. He was there when he first learned about Joan of Arc in 1429. Jean Girard and one of the king's advisors, Pierre Lhermite, wrote to him for advice on dealing with Joan. Although cautious at first, he was convinced of her claims after the lifting of the siege of Orléans on 8 May. Before learning of the king's coronation at Reims on 17 July, he wrote a second response in favour of Joan.

Gélu was present at the execution of Joan of Arc in Rouen on 30 May 1431. He had written to Charles VII urging him to ransom Joan. He was long remembered as a "defender of Joan of Arc". On 30–31 July 1932, the fifth centenary of the death of Gélu was celebrated with reenactments in Embrun. A photographic record of the event was published as a booklet.

==== Prince of the Empire ====
As archbishop, Gélu also ruled a secular principality as a prince of the Holy Roman Empire. There is a surviving tiers de gros coin minted during Gélu's episcopate. It bears the inscription "Jacques, archbishop and prince of Embrun" in Latin and on the obverse a lion with two six-sided stars, the meaning of which is unclear but which is similar to the coat of arms of Bréziers. In 1429, Gélu welcomed the inquisitor Pierre Fabri into his diocese.

Gélu was too ill to attend the Council of Basel that year. Nevertheless, at Parma on 27 April 1432, he did homage to Sigismund and received investiture of his principality. Gélu was the last archbishop of Embrun to do homage to an emperor, Sigismund having just received the Iron Crown and being on his way to Rome to be crowned emperor by the pope. In return, Sigismund confirmed the rights and privileges granted to the archbishops by his predecessors, in spite of the rights that had been confirmed to the king of France as imperial vicar over the Kingdom of Arles (the part of the Empire in which Embrun lay). On 7 May, while still at Parma, Sigismund blocked some subjects of Embrun from appealing certain new taxes to Rome. In June, Gélu was negotiating with Pope Eugene IV on behalf of Sigismund regarding the Hussite Crusade. He died at Embrun on 7 September 1432. He was succeeded at Embrun by his old friend Jean Girard.

== Works ==
Detail from MS 568, the manuscript to which Jacques Gélu added in his own hand a short autobiography

=== Autobiography ===
Gélu wrote a short autobiography on two leaves of a manuscript he owned, now MS 568 in the municipal library of Tours. It covers only the years 1391–1414. The Latin text has been published under the title Vita Jacobi Gelu, archiepiscopi Turonensis, ab ipso conscripta, alongside a modern French translation.

According to Marcellin Fornier, Gélu spent his early days in Embrun investigating the archives and writing accounts of some of his predecessors. He also continued his own autobiography, probably for the years 1421–1427. These works are lost, but Fornier had access to a copy of the autobiography. It was destroyed along with much of the Embrun archives during the French Revolution.

=== Reports, letters and sermons ===
Also lost during the Revolution were the sermons Gélu preached during his visitations in Embrun. He preached in both Latin and the local Franco-Provençal language.

Gélu's report to the Council of Constance on the Perpignan conference, which reflected the views of Sigismund himself, is preserved because it was copied into the diary of Giacomo Cerretani.

Several of Gélu's letters survive. He wrote to Henry V of England urging him to renounce the Treaty of Troyes and respect the rights of his brother-in-law, the Dauphin. This letter probably dates to late 1420. Gélu argued that the treaty was invalid because the king was not in his right mind, Queen Isabeau was "fragile and susceptible" and the princes had no right to give the kingdom away. Moreover, Henry had a fraternal duty to the Dauphin since his marriage to Catherine of Valois. Gélu also wrote to Yolande, Charles VII's mother-in-law. This letter may be from as early as 1425 or perhaps after his departure for Embrun. He recommended that Charles reconcile with John V of Brittany and Duke Philip the Good of Burgundy, perhaps through the mediation of Duke Amadeus VIII of Savoy.

=== Writings about Joan ===
Gélu's writings about Joan of Arc are his best known. Only traces and incomplete copies survive of the letters he wrote about Joan to Girard and Lhermite; to Queen Marie; to Marie's mother, Yolande; and to the king. The letter to Girard and Lhermite is found only in a 17th-century copy. The longer Latin tract that he wrote in two or three weeks in June 1429 survives in two contemporary copies. Addressed to Charles VII, its title is Epistola ... super adventum Johanne (or De adventu Johanne), in French De la venue de Jeanne ('On the Coming of Joan'). In one of the manuscripts, a modern hand has added the alternative title De puella aurelianensi dissertatio ('Discourse on the Maid of Orléans'). In his initial response to Girard and Lhermite, Gélu gave three reasons to be sceptical of Joan: she was from Lorraine, on the border of the Duchy of Burgundy; she was a shepherdess, and these were easily seduced; and, because she was a girl, "it may appear to her a slight matter to wield arms, to lead captains as well as to preach, to render justice, and to serve as an advocate."

In his treatise De adventu Johanne, convinced by the victory at Orléans, Gélu defended Joan as a messenger from God. It is one of the earliest treatments, only slightly later than Jean Gerson's De mirabili victoria, and attests to ongoing debate about Joan at the royal court. Gélu begins his treatise with a recapitulation of the Hundred Years' War. His method is pure scholasticism. Potential objections are raised and answered systematically. He likens Joan to the sibyls of antiquity. His overriding concern is the defence of France and the rights of Charles VII. Perhaps for that reason, his treatise had little influence on discussion of Joan in the 15th century. It played no part in her trial or her later rehabilitation trial.

According to Marcellin Fornier, Gélu also wrote a vernacular treatise on Joan, but it has not survived.

== Works cited ==
- Autrand, Françoise (1981). Naissance d'un grand corps de l'État: Les Gens du Parlement de Paris, 1345–1454. Publications de la Sorbonne.
- Chareyron, Régis; Millon, Philippe; Sublet, Roland (2013). "Monnaie inédite de Jacques Gelu archevêque d'Embrun de 1427 à 1432". Bulletin de la Société Française de Numismatique. 68 (4): 85–86.
- Chiron, Yves (2024). Les dix conclaves qui ont marqué l'histoire. Perrrin.
- Contamine, Philippe (2009). "Jacques Gélu (vers 1370–1432), archevêque de Tours (1414–1427), archevêque d'Embrun (1427–1432): Éléments d'un parcours politique". In Laurence Ciavaldini Rivière; Anne Lemonde-Santamaria; Ilaria Taddei (eds.). Entre France et Italie: Mélanges offerts à Pierrette Paravy. Presses universitaires de Grenoble. pp. 261–279.
- Dorange, Auguste (1874–1876). "Vie de monseigneur Gélu, archevêque de Tours au XV^{e} siècle". Bulletin de la Société archéologique de Touraine. 3: 267–280.
- Eubel, Conradus, ed. (1913). Hierarchia catholica, Tomus 1 (2nd ed.). Libreria Regensbergiana.
- Hanne, Olivier (2012). "De la venue de Jeanne de Jacques Gélu". Jeanne d'Arc et la guerre de cent ans. 1: 2–5.
- Humbert, Jacques (1972). Embrun et l'Embrunais à travers l'histoire. Société d'études des Hautes-Alpes.
- Johnes, Thomas, ed. (1867). The Chronicles of Enguerrand de Monstrelet. George Routledge and Sons.
- Leroux, Alfred (1892). Nouvelles recherches critiques sur les relations politiques de la France avec l'Allemagne de 1378 à 1461. E. Bouillon.
- McGrady, Deborah L. (2025). Joan of Arc: The Life of a French Cultural Icon. Boydell Press.
- Paravy, Pierrette (1993). De la chrétienté romaine à la Réforme en Dauphiné: Évêques, fidèles et déviants, vers 1340–vers 1530. Vol. Part 1. École française de Rome.
- Pernoud, Régine; Clin, Marie-Veronique (1998) [1986]. Bonnie Wheeler (ed.). Joan of Arc: Her Story. Translated by Jeremy duQuesnay Adams. St. Martin's Griffin.
- Stump, Phillip H. (2009). "The Council of Constance (1414–18) and the End of the Schism". In Joelle Rollo-Koster; Thomas M. Izbicki (eds.). A Companion to the Great Western Schism (1378–1417). pp. 395–442.
- Sumption, Jonathan (2016). The Hundred Years War, Volume 4: Cursed Kings. Faber & Faber.
- Vallery-Radot, Sophie (2014). "La diplomatie menée par l'ambassade du roi de France au Concile de Constance". Vorträge und Forschungen. 79: 89–106.

Catholic Church titles
| Preceded by Ameil du Breuil | Archbishop of Tours; 1414–1427 | Succeeded by Philippe de Coëtquis |
| Preceded by Michel Étienne | Archbishop of Embrun; 1427–1432 | Succeeded by Jean Girard |
