= Count of Diois =

French title of nobility

- Creation date: First: 1350 - Cedes to House of Borgia: 1498
- Created by: House of Valois
- Peerage: French nobility - Vatican
- First holder: Philip VI of France
- Present holder: House of Borgia

Count of Die, Diois or Dyois (French: Comte de Die or Diois; Vivaro-Alpine Occitan: Còmte de Diá or Diés) is a title of nobility, originally in the French peerage.

It has been created multiple times. It existed as an entity in the Middle Ages from at least the 10th Century, later passing to the Counts of Valentinois and the Bishop-Counts of Die (or Diois) before both were incorporated into Dauphiny proper. It was re-created in 1350 by King Philip VI of France from part of the lands and titles sold to him by Dauphin Humbert II of Viennois. At this time, Dauphiny comprised the Counties of Valentinois, Albon, Grésivaudan, Grenoble, Oisans, Briançon (or Briançonnais), Embrun, and Gap; the Barony of La Tour du Pin; and the Dauphiny of Viennois. The County of Diois was also given to Cesar Borgia, then Duke of Valentinois, by King Louis XII.

== Background ==
The origins of the County of Diois are obscure, as sources before the 11th Century are scarce.

The Counts of Diois became, at some point, nominal vassals of the Bishop-Counts of Diois, which led to repeated disputes. Raymond V of Toulouse (in 1156) and Frederic Barbarossa (in 1178) granted many of the Counts' lands in the Diois to the Bishops, with the latter awarding to the Bishops full jurisdiction and royal rights over the city of Die and all William of Poitiers' lands in the diocese save for the Castle of Quint to the Bishop-Counts.

The title of Count of Die/Diois seems to have persisted among the Counts of Valentinois separately from the Bishop-Counts of Diois, as the county was given to Aymar of Poitiers by the Count of Toulouse in 1189.

The later county of Diois was born from part of the Dauphiny of Viennois, an ancient group of lands and titles in the Holy Roman Empire since 1032. All titles were under Dauphin of Viennois denomination and Houses which were its owner, were powerful in late-Middle Ages and renaissance. In the 15th century, Dauphiny of Viennois at the head of House de La Tour du Pin, presented several conflicts in pursuit of absolutist Capet-Valois policy. It was fortunate for France that Humbert II de la Tour-du-Pin, last Dauphin of Viennois, had been incompetent and extravagant, lacking the warlike ardour of his brother Guigues VIII. How Dauphine he depleted his treasury funding a vain Crusade to rescue the Holy Land, failuring at all in his propose and after the death of his only son André and without issue and being an incompetent and luxurious man, he decides sale his patrimony to the best offer.

With financial difficulties building up, he made an inventory of his possessions, with the hope of selling them to Pope Benedict XII in 1339, but when Pope Clement VI brought the two sides to negotiations, the terms included the possibility of Humbert marrying Bianca of Savoy, though this did not reach agreement. The planned sale to the pope falling through, Humbert finally succeeded in completing a sale to Philip VI of France in 1349 for 400,000 écus and an annual pension. To save appearances, however, the sale was referred to as a "transfer". In order to prevent the title from going into abeyance or being swallowed up in another sovereign title, Humbert instituted the "Delphinal Statute" whereby the Dauphiné was exempted from many taxes and imposts. This statute was subject to much parliamentary debate at regional level, as local leaders sought to defend their autonomy and privilege against the state.

Instituted from 1349 as Royal patrimony, Dauphiny of Viennois was transformed in Dauphiny of France, a title was carried by all heirs of the Kingdom of France. In 1498 and more than a century after, Louis XII divided Dauphiny lands and delivered Valence, Diois, Grenoble in quality of Dukedom and Counties at Cesar Borgia when Pope Alexander VI gave his support in pursuit of defense of great feudal lords and because annulled his marriage with Joan and instead married Anne of Brittany, the widow of his cousin Charles VIII. This marriage allowed Louis to reinforce the personal Union of Brittany and France.

== Counts of Diois ==
House of Die

The genealogy of the old House of Die is hard to establish, but can be described roughly as follows.

- Aleyris (countess in 1027)
- ...
- Pons (count in 1062), had two children: William and Guillelme (an Old French feminine of William).
- William had a son, Isoard.
- Isoard I, lord of Luc, Aix, and Bellegarde. A military man, he fought in Spain by 1080 and joined the First Crusade in 1096. He led the 11th Army Corps at the Siege of Antioch in 1098.
- Josserand (†by 1149), married to a Beatrice.
- Isoard II (†after 1166), had four children: Peter Isoard; a countess of Die; Roais; and Isoarda.
- Isoarde (†after 1204), married to Raymond d'Agoult, without children.

House of Poitiers

- See Count of Valentinois

House of Valois

- Charles I of Viennois (1338–1380), also king of France as Charles V, Dauphin of Viennois, Count of Diois and Valentinois, Duke of Normandy, ruled the dauphinate as the first Dauphin of France (1350–1364) and ruled the dauphinate as king of France (1364–1366)
- Charles I of Viennois, ruled the dauphinate as king of France (1366–1368)
- Charles II of Viennois (1368–1422), also king of France as Charles VI, Dauphin of Viennois, Count of Diois and Valentinois, ruled the dauphinate as third Dauphin of France (1368–1380), ruled the dauphinate as king of France (1380–1386)
- Charles III of Viennois (1386), Dauphin of Viennois, Count of Diois and Valentinois, ruled the dauphinate as fourth Dauphin of France (1386)
- Charles II of Viennois, ruled the dauphinate as king of France (1386–1392)
- Charles IV of Viennois (1392–1401), Dauphin of Viennois, Count of Diois and Valentinois, Duke of Guyenne, ruled the dauphinate as fifth Dauphin of France (1392–1401)
- Louis I of Viennois (1397–1415), Dauphin of Viennois, Count of Diois and Valentinois, Duke of Guyenne, ruled the dauphinate as sixth Dauphin of France (1401–1415)
- John III of Viennois (1398–1417), Dauphin of Viennois, Count of Diois and Valentinois, Duke of Touraine, ruled the dauphinate as seventh Dauphin of France (1415–1417)
- Charles V of Viennois (1403–1461), also king of France as Charles VII, Dauphin of Viennois, Count of Diois, Valentinois and Ponthieu, ruled the dauphinate as eighth Dauphin of France (1417–1422), ruled the dauphinate as king of France/King of Bourges (1422–1423/1429)
- Louis II of Viennois (1423–1483), also king of France as Louis XI, Dauphin of Viennois, Count of Diois and Valentinois, ruled the dauphinate as ninth Dauphin of France (1423/1429–1461), ruled the dauphinate as king of France (1461–1466)

House of Borgia

- Cesar Borgia, Prince of Andria, Prince of Venafri, Duke of Valentinois, Duke of Romagna created by apostolic authority and cardinals coincil, Duke of Urbino, Count of Dyois, Duke of Camerino by apostolic authority and cardinal coincil and Lord of Imola, Forlì, Sassoferrato, Fermo, Fano, Cesena, Pesaro, Rimini, Faenza, Montefiore, Sant'Arcangelo, Verucchio, Catezza, Savignano, Meldola, Porto Cesenatico, Tossignano, Salaruolo, Monte Battaglia, Forlimpopoli, Bertinoro.
- House of Borgia. title of Count of Diois is part of "Mayorazgo" instituted by Pope Alexander VI (Rodrigo Borgia).

Diois lands remained after dead of Cesar Borgia under Kingdom of France domine as part of dauphinate, with French Revolution passed to Republic of France and Napoleonic empire until it was instaurated the third Republic of France when Diois remained joined to French Republic as region denominated Diois inside French Drôme department in southeastern France and the commune of Die.

According to actual laws in the French Fifth Republic, the title Count of Diois doesn't exist, just like all ancient noble titles of the Kingdom of France and Napoleonic empire; nevertheless, the same laws permit its use like part of name as particle of dignity.
