= County of Valentinois =

Arms of the Counts of Valentinois

The Count of Valentinois was originally the official in charge of the region (county) around Valence (Roman Valentia). It evolved in a hereditary title of nobility, still indicating control of the Valentinois and often of the Diois. The title later became the Duke of Valentinois.

== Counts of Valentinois ==
The County of Valence (Valentinois) was a fiefdom of the Holy Roman Empire, which was first held by Odilon, a count in Valence.

=== Family of Odilon ===
- 886-887: Odilon
- 879–912: Adalelm
- 912–943: Boson (Boso)
- 943–960: Geilin I
- 950-???: Gonthar (House of Poitiers).
- 961-1011: The title was dormant.
- 1011–???: Lambert
- 1037–???: Adémar, Comes Valentinensis, in conflict with the Albon family.
- 1058–???: Geilin II

=== House of Poitiers ===
Named after the castle of Pictavis, now part of Châteauneuf-de-Bordette, and unrelated to the city of Poitiers in western France. It is also entirely distinct from the House of Poitiers-Aquitaine.

- 1128–1148: Adémar I (Aymar I), vassal of Ermengard of Narbonne.
- 1148-1152: Eustace, bishop and count of Valentinois.
- 1152–1189: William.
- 1188/9–1239: Adémar II (Aymar II) husband of Rixende, heir countess of Valentinois.
- 1239–1277: Adémar III (Aymar III)
- 1277–1329: Adémar IV (Aymar IV)
- 1329–1339: Adémar V (Aymar V)
- 1339–1345: Louis I
- 1345–1374: Adémar VI (Aymar VI)
- 1374–1419: Louis II

The counts of Valentinois of House of Poitiers remained vassals of the Dauphin of Viennois until 1338; they held the title until the death of Louis of Poitiers in 1419. On 1029 Valence passed to the House of Albon the Dauphins of Viennois. In 1338 it fell to Philip VI of France.

=== House of Valois ===
- Charles I of Viennois (1338–1380), also king of France as Charles V, Dauphin of Viennois, Count of Diois and Valentinois, Duke of Normandy, ruled the Dauphiné as the first Dauphin of France (1350–1364) and ruled the Dauphiné as king of France (1364–1366)
- Charles I of Viennois, ruled the dauphiné as king of France (1366–1368)
- Charles II of Viennois (1368–1422), also king of France as Charles VI, Dauphin of Viennois, Count of Diois and Valentinois, ruled the dauphiné as third Dauphin of France (1368–1380) and as king of France (1380–1386)
- Charles III of Viennois (1386), Dauphin of Viennois, Count of Diois and Valentinois, ruled the dauphiné as fourth Dauphin of France (1386)
- Charles II of Viennois, ruled the Dauphiné as king of France (1386–1392)
- Charles IV of Viennois (1392-1401), Dauphin of Viennois, Count of Diois and Valentinois, Duke of Guyenne, ruled the Dauphiné as fifth Dauphin of France (1392–1401)
- Louis I of Viennois (1397–1415), Dauphin of Viennois, Count of Diois and Valentinois, Duke of Guyenne, ruled the Dauphiné as sixth Dauphin of France (1401–1415)
- John III of Viennois (1398–1417), Dauphin of Viennois, Count of Diois and Valentinois, Duke of Touraine, ruled the Dauphiné as seventh Dauphin of France (1415–1417)
- Charles V of Viennois (1403–1461), also king of France as Charles VII, Dauphin of Viennois, Count of Diois, Valentinois and Ponthieu, ruled the Dauphiné as eighth Dauphin of France (1417–1422) and as king of France/King of Bourges (1422–1423/1429)
- Louis II of Viennois (1423–1483), also king of France as Louis XI, Dauphin of Viennois, Count of Diois and Valentinois, ruled the Dauphiné as ninth Dauphin of France (1423/1429–1461) and as king of France (1461–1466)

=== House of Borgia ===
- Cesar Borgia, Prince of Andria, Prince of Venafro, Duke of Valentinois, Duke of Romagna created by apostolic authority and the college of Cardinals, Duke of Urbino, Count of Diois, Duke of Camerino, Lord of Imola, Forlì, Sassoferrato, Fermo, Fano, Cesena, Pesaro, Rimini, Faenza, Montefiore, Sant'Arcangelo, Verucchio, Catezza, Savignano, Meldola, Porto Cesenatico, Tossignano, Salaruolo, Monte Battaglia, Forlimpopoli, Bertinoro.

After the death of Cesar Borgia, the Duchy became a part of the French Royal domain as a part of the Dauphiné. It is now the capital of the Drôme department within the Auvergne-Rhône-Alpes region.

== Sources ==
- Frachette, Christian (1998). "Valence au dixième siècle (879–1029)". Études drômoises. 96.
- Linskill, Joseph. "An Enigmatic Poem of Raimbaut de Vaqueiras". The Modern Language Review, 53:3 (1958), p. 355–63.
