= X =

Twenty-fourth letter of the Latin alphabet

- X x

Usage
- Writing system: Latin script
- Type: Alphabetic and logographic
- Language of origin: Latin language Greek language
- Sound values: [tʼ]; [s]; [z]; [t͡s]; [d͡z]; [ʃ]; [ʒ]; [t͡ʃ]; [d͡ʒ]; [ɕ]; [ɖ]; [k]; [x]; [ks]; [ɡz] (Note: as in exactly); [kʃ]; [ɡʒ] (Note: as in the English word luxurious); [χ]; [ħ]; [h]; [ʔ]; [ǁ]; [∅]
- In Unicode: U+0058, U+0078
- Alphabetical position: 24

History
- Development: 𐊐 χ: 𐌗; X x
- Time period: c. 700 BCE to present
- Descendants: ×; ⨘; ⨉; ⨯; ✗; ☒; X̧
- Sisters: Х; 𐍇; Ⴕ ქ; Ⴟ ჯ

Other
- Associated graphs: x(x)
- Writing direction: Left-to-right

X (minuscule: x) is the twenty-fourth letter of the Latin alphabet, used in the modern English alphabet, the alphabets of other western European languages and others worldwide. Its name in English is ex (pronounced /ˈɛks/), plural exes.

== History ==
Western Greek Chi	Etruscan X	Latin X

The letter ⟨X⟩, representing /ks/, was inherited from the Etruscan alphabet. It perhaps originated in the ⟨Χ⟩ of the Euboean alphabet or another Western Greek alphabet, which also represented /ks/. Its relationship with the ⟨Χ⟩ of the Eastern Greek alphabets, which represented /kʰ/, is uncertain.

The pronunciation of /ks/ in the Romance languages underwent sound changes, with various outcomes:

- French: /js/ (e.g., laisser from laxare)
- Italian: /ss/ (e.g., asse from axem) and, in some cases, /ʃʃ/ (e.g., lasciare from laxare)
- Portuguese: /jʃ/ (e.g., eixo from axem)
- Romanian: /ps/ (e.g., coapsă from coxa) and /s/ (e.g., lăsa from laxare)
- Old Spanish: /ʃ/
  - Spanish: /x/ (e.g., cuja from coxa)

In Old Spanish, ⟨x⟩ came to represent /ʃ/, which it still represents in most Iberian languages and in the orthographies of other languages influenced by Spanish, such as Nahuatl. In French (with a few exceptions), Italian, Romanian, and modern Spanish, ⟨x⟩ was replaced by other letters.

The use of ⟨x⟩ to represent /ks/ was reintroduced to the Romance languages via Latin loanwords. In many words, the /ks/ was voiced as /gz/.

== Use in writing systems ==
Pronunciation of ⟨x⟩ by language
Orthography	Phonemes	Environment
Asturian	/ʃ/	All environments
Asturian	/s/	In between-vowels, only in learned loanwords, can usually be written as s as well
Afar	/ɖ/	
Albanian	/dz/	
Azeri	/x/	
Basque	/ʃ/	
Catalan	/t͡ʃ ~ ʃ/	Usually (word-initially, after consonants)
Catalan	/(j)ʃ/	In the digraph ix
Catalan	/gz/	In the initial groups ex- and inex- followed by vowel, ⟨h⟩ or a voiced consonant
Catalan	/ks/	Between vowels, between a vowel and voiceless consonant and word-finally, after a vowel or consonant
Standard Chinese (Pinyin)	/ɕ/	
Dutch	/ks/	Usually, mainly used in loanwords
Dutch	/s/	In Texel
English	/ks/	Usually; before an unstressed vowel
English	/gz/	Before a stressed vowel
English	/z/	Word-initially
English	/h/	In words derived from other languages, especially Spanish and Classical Nahuatl/Nahuatl.
Esperanto	in digraphs only as a substitute for a diacritic	cx, gx, hx, jx, sx, ux are used as substitutes for ĉ, ĝ, ĥ, ĵ, ŝ, ŭ where these characters are not available, see X-convention
French	/ks/	Usually; in Aix- (prefix or name of several places)
French	/gz/	Mainly in the prefix ex- followed by a vowel; sometimes word-initially
French	Silent	Word-finally with no liaison
French	/z/	Word-finally with liaison; in sixième (6th) and dixième (10th)
French	/s/	In six (6), dix (10), Auxerre, and Bruxelles (Brussels)
Galician	/ʃ/	Usually
Galician	/(k)s/	Some learned loanwords
German	/ks/	Mainly used in loanwords
Indonesian	/s/	In the beginning of a word, mainly used in loanwords for science
Indonesian	/ks/	In the middle or the end of a word, although words borrowed with the letter x in the middle or the end of a word are almost always replaced by the letters 'ks'. However, the letter x does appear in the middle or the end of certain names.
Italian	/ks/	Mainly used in learned loanwords
Kurdish	/x/	
Lao romanization	/s/	A "low consonant", affects the tone of the following vowel
Leonese	/ʃ/	
Ligurian	/ʒ/	
Maltese	/ʃ/	
Mayan (ALMG)	/ʃ/	
Nahuatl	/ʃ/	
Nguni	/ǁ/	
Norwegian	/ks/	Archaic
Occitan	/t͡s/	Usually
Occitan	/s/	Before consonants
Occitan	/ɡz/	In the prefix ex- before vowels in the Provençal, Limousin, Auvergnat, Vivaro-Alpine, and Niçard dialects
Occitan	/ɡʒ/	Before ⟨i⟩ and ⟨u⟩ in the Auvergnat dialect
Oromo	/tʼ/	
Pirahã	/ʔ/	
Polish	/ks ~ gz/	Unused in Polish orthography, except in loanwords.
Portuguese	/ʃ/	Usually, always when word-initially
Portuguese	/ks/	Found between vowels in some words, mainly in those that entered the language recently
Portuguese	/s/	When preceded by ⟨e⟩ and succeeded by a consonant
Portuguese	/z/	In the prefixes ⟨ex⟩ when before a vowel and ⟨exo⟩
Portuguese	/gz/	Optionally in the prefix hexa-, although most dialects just pronounce this prefix's ⟨x⟩ as /ks/ or /z/
Sardinian	/ʒ/	
Sicilian	/ʃ/	Old Sicilian words and names, e.g. Craxi and Giancaxio
Sicilian	/k(ə)s(ə)/	Loanwords
Somali	/ħ/	
Spanish	/(k)s/	Usually
Spanish	/s/	Word-initially
Spanish	/ʃ/, /t͡ʃ/, /x/	In some names and words
Swedish	/ks/	
Uzbek	/χ/	
Venetian	/z/	Usually
Venetian	/s/	In Venexia, "Venice"
Vietnamese	/s/	

=== English ===
In English orthography, ⟨x⟩ is typically pronounced as the voiceless consonant cluster /ks/ when it follows the stressed vowel (e.g. ox), and the voiced consonant /ɡz/ when it precedes the stressed vowel (e.g. exam). It is also pronounced /ɡz/ when it precedes a silent ⟨h⟩ and a stressed vowel (e.g. exhaust). Due to yod-coalescence, the sequence ⟨xi⟩ before a vowel can be pronounced /kʃ/ resulting from earlier /ksj/, e.g. in -xion(-), -xious(-). Similarly, the sequence ⟨xu⟩ can be pronounced with /kʃ/ (e.g. flexure, sexual) or /ɡʒ/ (in luxury and its derivatives). Due to NG-coalescence, the sequence ⟨nx⟩ can be pronounced /ŋz/ in anxiety.

When ⟨x⟩ ends a word, it is always /ks/ (e.g. fax), except in loan words such as faux. When ⟨x⟩ does start a word, it is usually pronounced 'z' (e.g. xylophone, xanthan). When starting in some names or as its own representation, it is pronounced 'eks', in rare recent loanwords or foreign proper names, it can also be pronounced /s/ (e.g. the obsolete Vietnamese monetary unit xu) or /ʃ/ (e.g. Chinese names starting with Xi, like Xiaomi or Xinjiang). Many of the words that start with ⟨x⟩ are of Greek origin, standardized trademarks (Xerox), or acronyms (XC).

In abbreviations, it can represent "trans-" (e.g. XMIT for transmit, XFER for transfer), "cross-" (e.g. X-ing for crossing, XREF for cross-reference), "Christ-" (e.g. Xmas for Christmas, Xian for Christian), the "crys-" in crystal (XTAL), "by" (SXSW for South by Southwest), or various words starting with "ex-" (e.g. XL for extra large, XOR for exclusive-or, or the extinction symbol).

X is the third least frequently used letter in English (after ⟨q⟩ and ⟨z⟩), with a frequency of about 0.15% in words. There are very few English words that start with ⟨x⟩ (the fewest of any letter).

=== Romance languages ===
In Latin, ⟨x⟩ stood for /ks/. In the Romance languages, as a result of assorted phonetic changes, ⟨x⟩ has other pronunciations:

- In Catalan, ⟨x⟩ has four to three (depending on the dialect) main pronunciations; the most common is /ʃ/ and/or /t͡ʃ/; as in xarop ('syrup'). Others are: /(j)ʃ/ with the digraph ⟨ix⟩: mateix ('same'), /ks/; fixar ('to fix'), /ɡz/; examen. In addition, /(j)ʃ/ (from the digraph ⟨ix⟩) gets voiced to [(j)ʒ] before voiced consonants or vowels; caixmir ('kashmir') and peix espasa ('sword fish'). Catalan also has the digraph ⟨tx⟩, pronounced /t͡ʃ/.
- In Galician and Leonese, ⟨x⟩ is pronounced /ʃ/ in most cases (often used in place of etymological g or j). The pronunciation /ks/ occurs in learned words, such as taxativo (taxing). However, Galician speakers tend to pronounce it /s/, especially when it appears before plosives, such as in externo ('external').
- In French, ⟨x⟩ usually represents /ks/ or (primarily in words beginning with ex- followed by a vowel) /ɡz/. It is pronounced /s/ in some city names such as Bruxelles (although some people pronounce it 'ks') or Auxerre; it is nevertheless pronounced /ks/ in Aix, the name of several towns. At the ends of other words, it is silent (or /z/ in liaison if the next word starts with a vowel). Two exceptions are pronounced /s/: six ('six') and dix ('ten'). It is pronounced /z/ in sixième and dixième.
- In Italian, ⟨x⟩ is either pronounced /ks/, as in extra, uxorio, xilofono, or /ɡz/, as in exogamia, when it is preceded by ⟨e⟩ and followed by a vowel. In several related languages, notably Venetian, it represents the voiced sibilant /z/. It is also used, mainly amongst young people, as a short written form for per (meaning "for"); for example, x sempre ('forever'). This is because in Italian, the multiplication sign is called per. However, ⟨x⟩ is found only in loanwords, as it is not part of the standard Italian alphabet; in most words with ⟨x⟩, this letter may be replaced with ⟨s⟩ or ⟨ss⟩ (with different pronunciation: xilofono/silofono, taxi/tassì) or, rarely, by 'cs' (with the same pronunciation: claxon/clacson).
- In Portuguese, ⟨x⟩ has four main pronunciations; the most common is /ʃ/, as in xícara ('cup'). The other sounds are: /ks/ as in flexão ('flexion'); /s/, when preceded by E and followed by a consonant, as in contexto (/ʃ/ in European Portuguese), and in a small number of other words, such as próximo (close/next); and (the rarest) /z/, which occurs in the prefix ⟨ex-⟩ before a vowel, as in exagerado ('exaggerated'). A rare fifth sound is /ɡz/, coexisting with /z/ and /ks/ as acceptable pronunciations in exantema and in words with the Greek prefix 'hexa-'.
- In Sardinian and Ligurian, ⟨x⟩ represents /ʒ/.
- In Old Spanish, ⟨x⟩ was pronounced /ʃ/, as it is still currently in other Iberian Romance languages. Later, the sound evolved to a /x/ sound. In modern Spanish, due to a spelling reform, whenever ⟨x⟩ is used for the /x/ sound it has been replaced with ⟨j⟩, including in words that originally had ⟨x⟩ such as ejemplo or ejercicio, though ⟨x⟩ is still retained for some names (notably México, even though Méjico may sometimes be used in Spain). Presently, ⟨x⟩ represents the sound /s/ (word-initially), or the consonant cluster /ks/ (e.g. oxígeno, examen). Rarely, it can be pronounced /ʃ/ as in Old Spanish in some proper nouns such as Raxel (a variant of Rachel) and Uxmal.
- In Venetian, ⟨x⟩ represents the voiced alveolar sibilant /z/, much like in Portuguese exagerado, English 'xylophone' or in the French sixième. Examples from medieval texts include raxon ('reason'), prexon ('prison'), dexerto ('desert'), and chaxa or caxa ('home'). Nowadays, the best-known word is xe ('is/are'). The most notable exception to this rule is the name Venexia, /veˈnɛsja/, in which ⟨x⟩ has evolved from the initial voiced sibilant /z/ to the present-day voiceless sibilant /s/.

=== Other languages ===
In languages which adopted the Latin alphabet later, ⟨x⟩ is used for various sounds, in some cases inspired by Latin or its descendants, but in others for unrelated consonants. Since the various Romance pronunciations of ⟨x⟩ can often be written in other ways, the letter becomes available for other sounds.

- In Albanian, ⟨x⟩ represents /dz/ while the digraph ⟨xh⟩ represents /dʒ/.
- It represents /x/ (voiceless velar fricative) in Apache, Azerbaijani, Kurdish (Hawar alphabet), Georgian (when Latinized), Lojban, Pashto (when Latinized), Tatar (Jaꞑalif, Zamanälif, official romanization of 2012), Uzbek, and Uyghur (Latin script).
- In Basque, ⟨x⟩ represents /ʃ/. Additionally, the digraph ⟨tx⟩ represents /tʃ/.
- In Hanyu Pinyin, Standard Chinese's official transcription system in China, Malaysia, Singapore, and Taiwan, the letter ⟨x⟩ represents the voiceless alveolo-palatal fricative /ɕ/, for instance in 'Xi', /ɕi/.
- In Dutch, ⟨x⟩ usually represents /ks/, except in the name of the island of Texel, which is pronounced Tessel. This is because of historical sound-changes in Dutch, where all /ks/ sounds have been replaced by /s/ sounds. Words with an ⟨x⟩ in the Dutch language are nowadays usually loanwords. In the Dutch-speaking part of Belgium, family names with ⟨x⟩ are not uncommon (e.g., Dierckxa and Hendrickx).
- In Esperanto, the x-convention replaces ⟨ĉ⟩, ⟨ĝ⟩, ⟨ĥ⟩, ⟨ĵ⟩, ⟨ŝ⟩, and ⟨ŭ⟩ with x-suffixes: ⟨cx⟩, ⟨gx⟩, ⟨hx⟩, ⟨jx⟩, ⟨sx⟩, and ⟨ux⟩.
- In German, generally pronounced /ks/; in native words, however, such as Ochs or wachsen, the cluster /ks/ is often written ⟨chs⟩.
- In transliterations of Indian languages, primarily Indo-Aryan languages, ⟨x⟩ represents the consonant cluster [kʃ] in alternate spellings of words containing क्ष (kṣ), especially names such as Laxmi and Dixit. Less frequently, ⟨x⟩ is used to represent ख़ /x/.
- In Lao, based on romanization of Lao consonants, ⟨x⟩ represents /s/, while appears to be homophonous with ⟨s⟩, it is a "low consonant" and affects the tone of the following vowel, e.g. in Lan Xang.
- In Maltese, ⟨x⟩ is pronounced /ʃ/ or, in some cases, /ʒ/ (only in loanwords such as 'televixin', and not for all speakers).
- In Nahuatl, ⟨x⟩ represents /ʃ/.
- In Nguni languages, ⟨x⟩ represents the alveolar lateral click /ǁ/.
- In Norwegian, ⟨x⟩ is generally pronounced /ks/, but since the 19th century, there has been a tendency to spell it out as ⟨ks⟩; it may still be retained in personal names, though it is fairly rare, and occurs mostly in foreign words and SMS language. Usage in Danish and Finnish is similar (while Swedish, on the other hand, makes frequent use of ⟨x⟩ in native words as well as in loanwords).
- In Pirahã, ⟨x⟩ symbolizes the glottal stop /ʔ/.
- In Polish, ⟨x⟩ was used prior to 19th century both in loanwords and native words and was pronounced /ks/ or /ɡz/, e.g., xiążę, xięstwo (now książę, księstwo). This was later replaced by ⟨ks⟩ and ⟨gz⟩ in almost all words and remained only in a few loanwords as 'xenia' (xenien), surnames as Axentowicz, Rexemowski, and Xiężopolski, names as Xawery, and Xymena, and abbreviations.
- In Vietnamese, ⟨x⟩ represents /s/. This sound was [ɕ] in Middle Vietnamese, resembling the Portuguese /ʃ/, spelled ⟨x⟩.

An illustrative example of ⟨x⟩ as a "leftover" letter is the differing usage in three different Cushitic languages:

- Afar: voiced retroflex plosive /ɖ/
- Oromo: alveolar ejective /tʼ/
- Somali: voiceless pharyngeal fricative /ħ/

=== Other systems ===
In the International Phonetic Alphabet, ⟨x⟩ represents a voiceless velar fricative.

== Other uses ==
- X mark has a widely accepted meaning of "negative" or "wrong".
- The Roman numeral X represents the number 10.
- In mathematics, x is commonly used as the name for an independent variable or unknown value. The modern tradition of using x, y, and z to represent an unknown (incognita) was introduced by René Descartes in La Géométrie (1637). As a result of its use in algebra, X is often used to represent unknowns in other circumstances (e.g. X-rays, The X-Files, and The Man from Planet X).
- On some identification documents, the letter X represents a non-binary gender, where F means female and M means male.
- In the Cartesian coordinate system, x is used to refer to the horizontal axis.
- It is also sometimes used as a typographic approximation for the multiplication sign, ×. In mathematical typesetting, x meaning an algebraic variable is normally in italic type ($x\!$), partly to avoid confusion with the multiplication symbol. In fonts containing both x (the letter) and × (the multiplication sign), the two glyphs are dissimilar.
- It can be used as an abbreviation for 'between' in the context of historical dating; e.g. "1483 x 1485".
- Maps and other images sometimes use an X to label a specific location, leading to the expression "X marks the spot".
- In art or fashion, the use of X indicates a collaboration by two or more artists, e.g. Aaron Koblin x Takashi Kawashima. This application, which originated in Japan, now extends to other kinds of collaboration outside the art world. This usage mimics the use of a similar mark in denoting botanical hybrids, for which scientifically the multiplication × is used, but informally, a lowercase "x" is also used.
- At the end of a letter or other correspondence, 'x' can mean a kiss; the earliest example of this usage cited by the Oxford English Dictionary is from 1878.
- An X rating denotes media, such as movies, that are intended for adults only.
- In the Korean language, a series of Xs is used as a visual bleep censor for subtitles and captions, serving the same role as an asterisk (*).
- In the C programming language, "x" preceded by zero (as in 0x or 0X) is used to denote hexadecimal literal values.
- X is commonly used as a prefix term in nouns related to the X Window System and Unix.

== Related characters ==
=== Descendants and related characters in the Latin alphabet ===
- X with diacritics: Ẍ ẍ Ẋ ẋ X̂ x̂ ᶍ
- IPA-specific symbols related to X: χ
- Teuthonista phonetic transcription-specific symbols related to X:
  - U+AB56 ꭖ LATIN SMALL LETTER X WITH LOW RIGHT RING
  - U+AB57 ꭗ LATIN SMALL LETTER X WITH LONG LEFT LEG
  - U+AB58 ꭘ LATIN SMALL LETTER X WITH LONG LEFT LEG AND LOW RIGHT RING
  - U+AB59 ꭙ LATIN SMALL LETTER X WITH LONG LEFT LEG WITH SERIF
- ˣ : Modifier letter small x is used for phonetic transcription
- ₓ : Subscript small x is used in Indo-European studies

=== Ancestors and siblings in other alphabets ===
- Χ χ : Greek letter Chi, from which the following derive:
  - Ꭓ ꭓ : Latin chi
  - Х х : Cyrillic letter Kha
  - Ⲭ ⲭ : Coptic letter Khe, which derives from Greek Chi
  - 𐍇 : Gothic letter enguz, which derives from Greek Chi
  - 𐌗 : Old Italic X, which derives from Greek Chi, and is the ancestor of modern Latin X
    - ᚷ : Runic letter Gyfu, which may derive from old Italic X
- Ξ ξ : Greek letter Xi, which was used in place of Chi in the Eastern (and the modern) Greek alphabets

== Other representations ==
=== Computing ===
- U+0058 X LATIN CAPITAL LETTER X
- U+0078 x LATIN SMALL LETTER X
- U+FF38 Ｘ FULLWIDTH LATIN CAPITAL LETTER X
- U+FF58 ｘ FULLWIDTH LATIN SMALL LETTER X

=== Other ===
NATO phonetic	Morse code
Xray	▄▄▄ ▄ ▄ ▄▄▄

Signal flag

Flag semaphore
American manual alphabet (ASL fingerspelling)
British manual alphabet (BSL fingerspelling)
Braille dots-1346
Unified English Braille

== See also ==
- X mark – Symbol with multiple meanings
