= Casola Valsenio =

- Comune
- Comune di Casola Valsenio
- Coat of arms

- Location within Italy Location within Emilia-Romagna
- Coordinates: 44°13′N 11°37′E
- Country: Italy
- Region: Emilia-Romagna
- Province: Ravenna (RA)
- Frazioni: Baffadi, Mercatale, Prugno, Sant'Apollinare, Valsenio, Zattaglia

Government
  - Mayor: Nicola Iseppi

Area
  - Total: 84.42 km^{2} (32.59 sq mi)
- Elevation: 195 m (640 ft)

Population (30 November 2017)
  - Total: 2,601
  - Density: 30.81/km^{2} (79.80/sq mi)
- Demonym: Casolani
- Time zone: UTC+1 (CET)
  - Summer (DST): UTC+2 (CEST)
- Postal code: 48010
- Dialing code: 0546
- Patron saint: St. Lucy of Syracuse
- Saint day: 13 December
- Website: Official website

Casola Valsenio (Romagnol: Chêsla) is a comune (municipality) in the Province of Ravenna in the Italian region Emilia-Romagna, located about 60 kilometres (37 mi) southeast of Bologna and about 60 kilometres (37 mi) southwest of Ravenna.

== History ==
The village was founded in 1216 after the Casola castle's destruction by the Faenza troops. Later it was a possession of the Pagani, Visconti, Manfredi, Riario families and of Cesare Borgia.

== Main sights ==
- Vena del Gesso Romagnola ("Romagna's Chalk Seam"), a rocky dorsal which cuts transversally the valley coming down from the Apennine Mountains.
- Villa il Cardello: an old guesthouse of the Abbey of Valsenio (dating back to the 12th century) as well as the residence of the famous poet and writer Alfredo Oriani where he died on October 18, 1909. Today, the house - national monument - is used as a writer's house-museum; the building is owned by the Fondazione Casa di Oriani.
- Watch Tower
- Chiesa di Sopra ("Upper Church")
- Monte Battaglia, a mountain topped by a medieval tower
- Abbey of Valsenio
