= Solaure-en-Diois =

- Commune
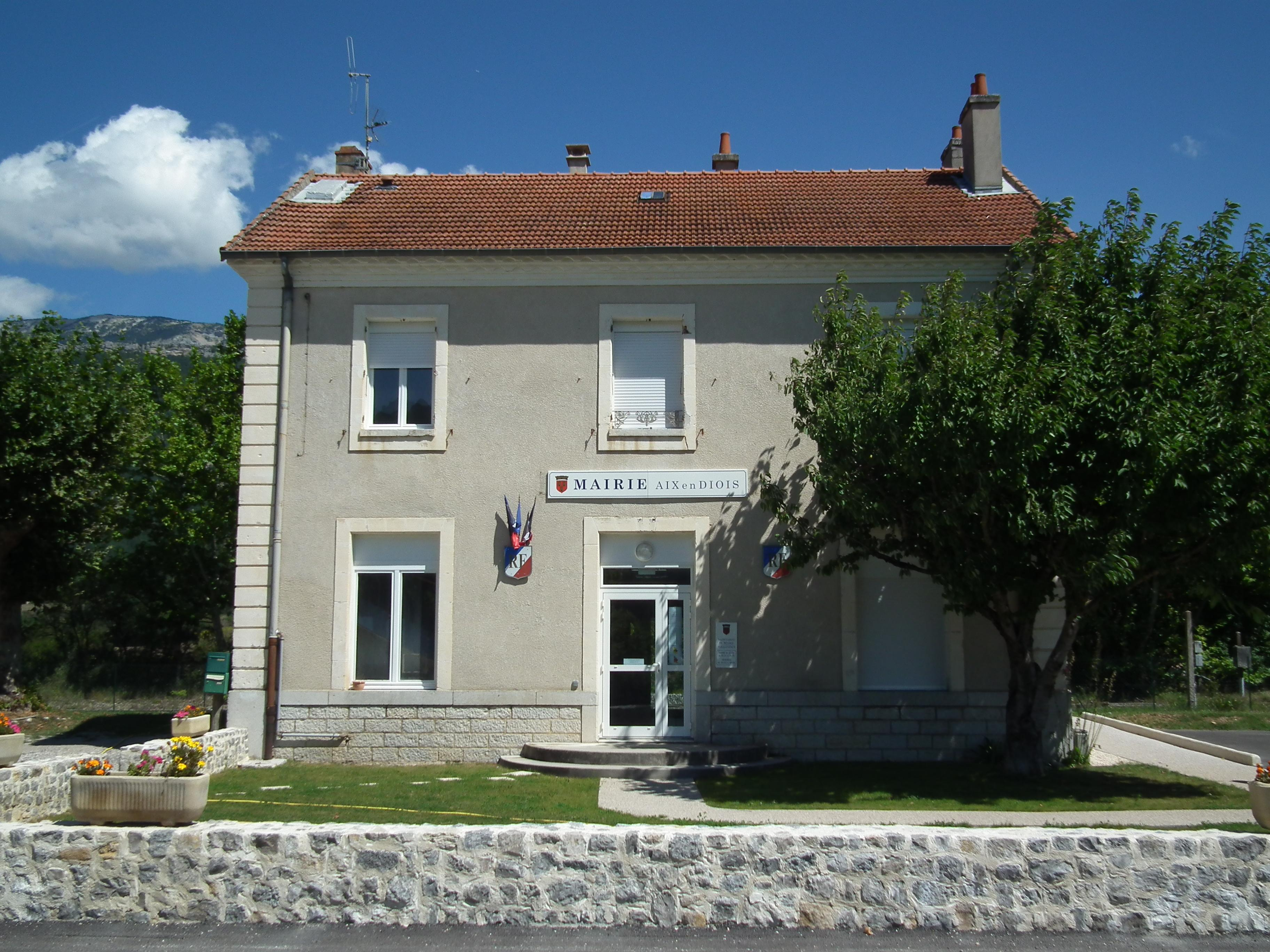
- The town hall, located in Aix-en-Diois
- Location of Solaure-en-Diois
- Location within France Location within Auvergne-Rhône-Alpes
- Coordinates: 44°42′36″N 5°24′07″E
- Country: France
- Region: Auvergne-Rhône-Alpes
- Department: Drôme
- Arrondissement: Die
- Canton: Le Diois

Government
  - Mayor (2020–2026): Maurice Mollard
- Area^{1}: 19.36 km^{2} (7.47 sq mi)
- Population (2023): 456
  - Density: 23.6/km^{2} (61.0/sq mi)
- Time zone: UTC+01:00 (CET)
  - Summer (DST): UTC+02:00 (CEST)
- INSEE/Postal code: 26001 /26150
- ^{1} French Land Register data, which excludes lakes, ponds, glaciers > 1 km^{2} (0.386 sq mi or 247 acres) and river estuaries.

Solaure-en-Diois (French pronunciation: [sɔlɔʁ ɑ̃ diwa]) is a commune in the Drôme department of southeastern France. The municipality was established on 1 January 2016 and consists of the former communes of Aix-en-Diois and Molières-Glandaz.

== See also ==
- Communes of the Drôme department
