= Aix =

Aix or AIX may refer to:

== Computing ==
- AIX, a line of IBM computer operating systems
- Alternate index, for an IBM Virtual Storage Access Method key-sequenced data set
- Athens Internet Exchange, a European Internet exchange point

== Places ==
=== Belgium ===
- Aix-sur-Cloie, in Wallonia

=== France ===
- Aix-en-Provence, in the Bouches-du-Rhône department
- Aix, Corrèze
- Aix-en-Diois, in the Drôme department
- Aix-en-Ergny, in the Pas-de-Calais department
- Aix-en-Issart, in the Pas-de-Calais department
- Aix-en-Othe, in the Aube department
- Aix-en-Pévèle, in the Nord department
- Aix-la-Fayette, in the Puy-de-Dôme department
- Aix-les-Bains, in the Savoie department
- Aix-Noulette, in the Pas-de-Calais department
- Aixe-sur-Vienne, in the Haute-Vienne department
- Île-d'Aix, island and commune of the Charente-Maritime department

=== Germany ===
- Aix-la-Chapelle, or Aachen

=== United States ===
- Aix, Indiana
- Mount Aix, in Washington state

== Other uses ==
- Air India Express, an Indian airline
- Aircraft Interiors Expo, a trade fair in Germany
- Aix (bird), a genus of ducks
- AIX Racing, a German auto racing team
- Astana International Exchange, stock exchange in Nursultan, Kazakhstan supported by Astana International Financial Centre
- ISO 639-3 code for the Aigon language
- Hainai, a Native American tribe sometimes also spelled Aix

== See also ==
- Armani Exchange (abbreviated A|X, with a vertical bar resembling the letter I)
