= Duke of Romagna =

Title of nobility, originally in the papal peerage

Dukedom of Romagna
- Creation date: 1501
- Created by: Pope Alexander VI and Cardinal council
- Peerage: Papal peerage
- First holder: Cesare Borgia
- Present holder: House of Borgia

Duke of Romagna is a title of nobility, originally in the papal peerage. It was created in 1501 by the Apostolic authority of Pope Alexander VI and the cardinal council for Cesare Borgia, Duke of Valentinois, after his conquest of Romagna, Urbino, and Camerino.

== Dukes of Romagna ==
1. Cesare Borgia (1501-1507), Prince of Andria, Prince of Venafri, Duke of Valentinois, Duke of Romagna created by apostolic authority and cardinals council, Duke of Urbino, Count of Dyois, Duke of Camerino by apostolic authority and cardinal council and Lord of Imola, Forli, Sasso Ferrato, Fermo, Fano, Cesena, Pesaro, Rimini, Faenza, Montefiore, Sant'Arcangelo, Verucchio, Catezza, Savignano, Meldola, Porto Cesenatico, Tossignano, Salaruolo, Monte Battaglia, Forlimpopoli, Bertinoro.
2. Louise Borgia y d'Albret de Châtillon-Limoges (1507-1553, nominal), Duchess of Valentinois Suo jure, Duchess of Romagna Suo jure. Dame of Chalaus.
3. House of Borgia (nominal). title of Duke of Romagna is part of "Mayorazgo" instituted by Pope Alexander VI (Rodrigo Borgia).

The Peace of Cateau-Cambrésis (1559) divided Romagna between the Farnese family, the Duchy of Parma and Piacenza, the House of Este of Ferrara, the Duchy of Modena and Reggio, and the Papal States, this last remained with most part of Romagna and with the total authority inside Papal States. In 1860 and inside mark of Kingdom of Italy, Pope Pius IX delivered Romagna like a province. However, after joining the unification of Italy in 1860, Romagna did not receive a separate status by the Savoy monarchs, who were afraid of dangerous destabilization. In the present day the region of the ancient dukedom of Romagna is part of Emilia-Romagna inside the Republic of Italy.

According to the laws of the Italian Republic, the titles of nobility of Italy ceased to exist with the fall of the monarchical regime.
