= Molières-Glandaz =

- Part of Solaure-en-Diois
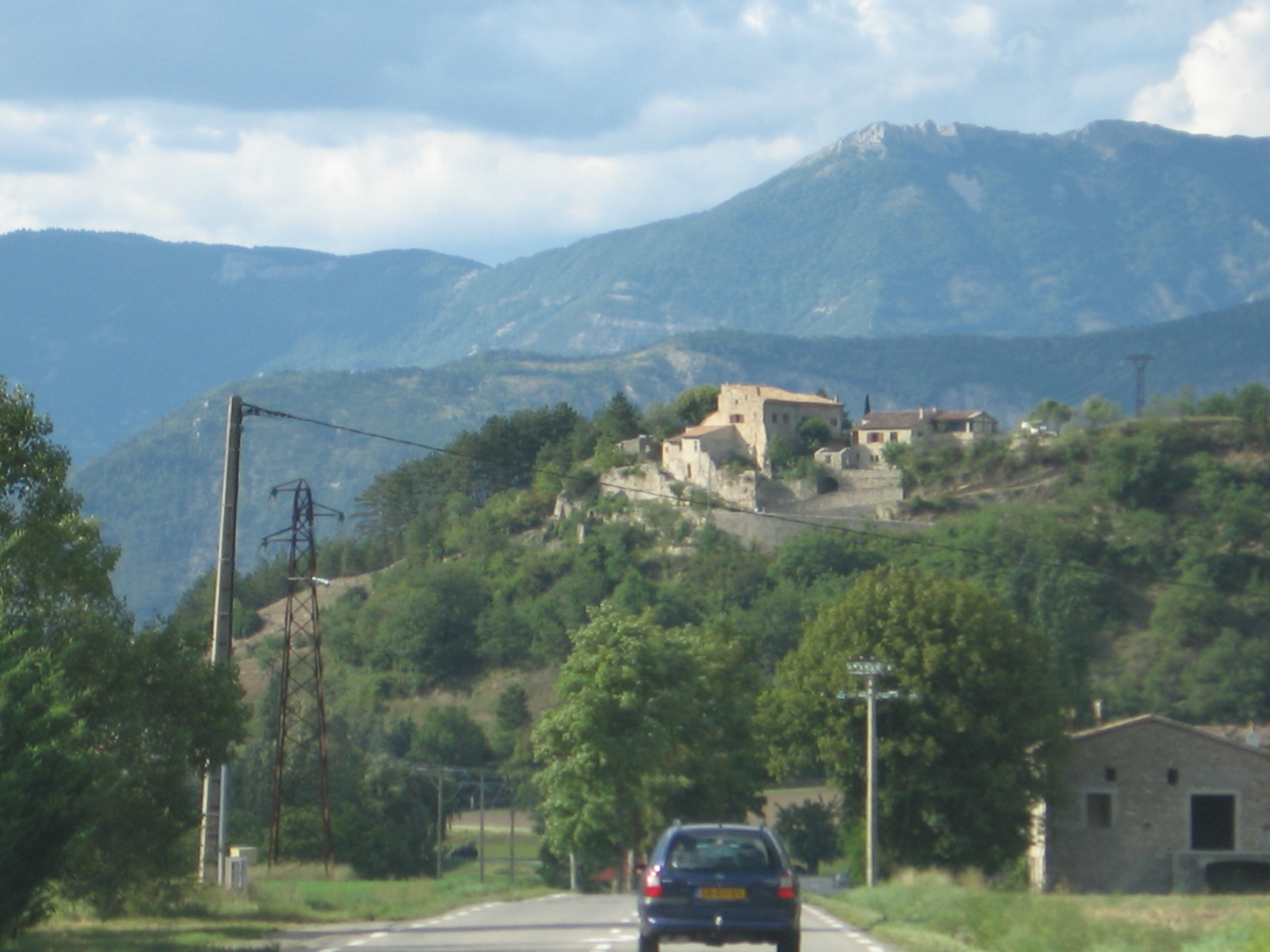
- Location of Molières-Glandaz
- Location within France Location within Auvergne-Rhône-Alpes
- Coordinates: 44°43′37″N 5°24′00″E
- Country: France
- Region: Auvergne-Rhône-Alpes
- Department: Drôme
- Arrondissement: Die
- Canton: Le Diois
- Commune: Solaure-en-Diois
- Area^{1}: 2.87 km^{2} (1.11 sq mi)
- Elevation: 440 m (1,440 ft)
- Highest elevation: 1,040 m (3,410 ft)
- Lowest elevation: 420 m (1,380 ft)
- Population (2023): 109
  - Density: 38.0/km^{2} (98.4/sq mi)
- Time zone: UTC+01:00 (CET)
  - Summer (DST): UTC+02:00 (CEST)
- Postal code: 26150
- ^{1} French Land Register data, which excludes lakes, ponds, glaciers > 1 km^{2} (0.386 sq mi or 247 acres) and river estuaries.

Molières-Glandaz (Vivaro-Alpine: Molèiras de Glandàs) is a former commune in the Drôme department in southeastern France. On 1 January 2016, it was merged into the new commune Solaure-en-Diois.

== See also ==
- Communes of the Drôme department
