= Revisionism of Risorgimento =

Italian historiographical debate

In the 20th century, and especially since the end of the Second World War, the received interpretation of Italian unification, the Risorgimento, has become the object of historical revisionism. The justifications offered for unification, the methods employed to realise it and the benefits supposedly accruing to unified Italy are frequent targets of the revisionists. Some schools have called the Risorgimento an imperialist or colonialist venture imposed by Savoy.

Some revisionists tend to negatively re-evaluate key characters of Italian national unity, such as Camillo Benso di Cavour, Giuseppe Garibaldi and Victor Emmanuel II of Savoy. They grafted in this way in the debate on the causes of the so-called Southern Question (Questione Meridionale), and say that the Risorgimento was a true work of colonization, followed by a centralizing policy of conquest, because of which the Italian Mezzogiorno would have fallen into a state of backwardness still manifest. Others consider that the policies of tax, toll and industry implemented in the southern regions by the Savoy government since 1861, together with endogenous factors, have further depleted the area or they have affected its development.

== Background and historical basis of revisionism on the Risorgimento ==
The ideas behind the revisionist movement already began to awaken and strengthen in the years immediately following the events that led to the Kingdom of Sardinia to become the Kingdom of Italy, even before the birth of a historical debate on the subject. The first doubts about the reasons behind the foreign policy of the House of Savoy were raised by Giuseppe Mazzini, one of the theorists and supporters of Italian unification. In this regard Mazzini suggested in his paper "Italy of the people" that the government of Cavour was not interested in the principle of a united Italy, but simply to push the boundaries of the Savoy state. Even once Italy was unified, Mazzini returned to attack the government in respect of the new nation: "There is no man who can understand how unhappy I feel when I see increasing year by year, from a materialistic and immoral government, corruption, skepticism about the benefits of Unity, the financial difficulties, and fade the entire future of Italy, all the ideal Italy."

Statements of Mazzini are precursors of the dispute on the ideal unification process, which began already during the 20th century, as a continuation of the contentious debate between the moderate and democratic parties of Risorgimento. The first criticism of the hagiographic reconstructions came by the same liberal leaders, who had enthusiastically promoted any political activity that would have contributed to the national cause. Among the main targets, there were contentious politics of the new centralized unitary state, defined negatively by the neologism of "piemontesizzazione" (homologation to Piedmont).

Parallel to the abovementioned political and ideal dispute, across the late 19th century began to appear the first historiographical contributions alternative to the mainstream historiography on the Italian Risorgimento. These works furnished the substrate on which the later revisionist theories were built.

A prime example was the writer Alfredo Oriani, which put into question the outcome of the events of the Risorgimento in his work The political struggle in Italy (1892), which examined the conflict between federalism and unitarianism. Oriani criticized the "royal conquest" as a unilateral action to create a new state, assuming that without the support of a strong democratic movement, it would prove to be weak in its foundations. This work is considered the prototype of the first modern revisionist historiography on Italy, alternately to apologetic historiography of Savoy.

Criticisms against the interpretation of the Risorgimento events were also moved by Francesco Saverio Nitti, who in his works North and South (Nord e Sud)(1900) and Italy at the dawn of the twentieth century (L'Italia all'alba del secolo XX) (1901), analyzed the consequences of the national Unity from a framework illustrating the political and economic situation in the pre-unification states. According to Nitti, the benefits of the national unification process were not equitably distributed throughout the country, facilitating further development of northern Italy at the expense of the South.

Oriani's ideas influenced the thinking of the liberal Piero Gobetti who in 1926 criticized the liberal ruling class in his collection of essays Risorgimento without heroes (Risorgimento senza eroi). According to Gobetti, the Risorgimento was the work of a minority who resigned to pursue a deeper social and cultural revolution. From this "failed revolution" a state unable to meet the needs of the masses was born.

In the same vein of political and cultural connotations, but with more openly Marxist-style, is part of the revisionist and anti-apologetic analysis of Antonio Gramsci. In his book Prison Notebooks (Quaderni del carcere), published posthumously only after 1947, he describes the Risorgimento as a "passive revolution" suffered by the peasants, the poorest social class of the population. The Southern question, Jacobinism, the construction of the revolutionary process in Italy are the central themes of his analysis on the basis of which he reinterprets the Italian Risorgimento as a process of socio-political transformation began in 1789 with the French Revolution, passively transposed in Italy, and hesitated in the collapse of the Ancien Régime.

== Historical revisionism ==
The reinterpretation of the Italian Risorgimento's events have not a single origin. The questioning of the assumptions of official history is coming from a part of the academic world and from several independent scholars, including several essayists. The growth of this cultural movement, in particular measure across the last fifty years, has generated the emergence of a growing critical literature of the broader historiography, which has gradually been the subject of increasingly acute dispute and controversy. Across the following paragraphs are presented the contributions to historical revisionism, divided according to the framework of origin.

=== The Financial Crisis of the Kingdom of Sardinia ===
Contrary to the good economic situation of the Kingdom of the Two Sicilies, revisionist authors argue that one of the reasons that pushed the Kingdom of Sardinia to engage in the conquest of the pre-unitary states was less connected to idealism and more to the financial crisis of the Savoyard state. Indeed, between 1848 and 1859, Turin is said to have accumulated a debt of about 910 million lire. Already in July 1850, Count Cavour, in a speech to the Chamber, expressed his concerns about the state of Piedmont's finances:

“I know, as everyone does, that if we continue on the path we have followed for two years, we shall go straight to bankruptcy, and that by continuing to increase our burdens, after a few years we shall be unable to contract new loans or repay the old ones.” — Camillo Benso di Cavour

Revisionist authors believe that the expenses sustained for the various expansionist wars, or those undertaken in order to insert the kingdom into the international diplomatic game, weighed heavily on the liabilities of the Savoyard state. In particular, the Crimean War, which Cavour regarded as a good springboard for introducing Piedmont onto the European political stage, imposed on Turin, in addition to the human sacrifice of one third of its contingent, a major economic sacrifice. This was financed by a debt to the United Kingdom that would not be paid off until 1902, burdening the state budget for more than forty years.

In reality, by observing the evolution of the budget of the Kingdom of Sardinia between 1830 and 1860, one notes a doubling of revenues but also very large spikes in expenditure corresponding to the two wars of independence (1847–50 and 1859–60), which produced significant budget deficits, with the 1850s also remaining in deficit, albeit mildly, due to Cavour's strongly expansionist policies. International diplomatic circles were aware of this situation, and British, French, and German newspapers even questioned the survival of the new Kingdom because of its budgetary difficulties.

The construction of a new fiscal framework was therefore a priority, but it is understandable why it could not be completed quickly, especially due to the military events that occurred in the meantime. It took a decade for it to be fully completed and a few years more for it to function properly, with the achievement of budget equilibrium in the mid-1870s.

Various sources confirm the state of heavy indebtedness of the Kingdom of Sardinia, while reporting a very different situation for the Kingdom of the Two Sicilies. What appears clearly is the great predominance of the debt inherited from the Kingdom of Sardinia (about 60% of the total, compared with 30% for the Kingdom of the Two Sicilies), with the other areas contributing only marginally.

The total level of indebtedness of the new Kingdom was not extremely high, but it was destined to grow rapidly, because revenues covered only about 60% of expenditures. Relative to the population of the new Kingdom, this debt represented 69 lire per capita. But per capita amounts varied significantly among the former states: Piedmont (142 lire), Tuscany (67 lire), Naples (63 lire), Lombardy (56 lire), Sicily (49 lire), other unified states (13 lire).

It is hardly disputable that the citizens of the new Kingdom were required to bear the burden of debts contracted by the Kingdom of Sardinia, without being able to enjoy the benefits of the works financed by those debts.

In the years following the annexation of the Kingdom of the Two Sicilies to the newborn Italian State, contemporary witnesses gave the prints the first works that brought a critical analysis of the political unification of the peninsula.

The first historian to develop an alternative vision to the mainstream historiography was probably Giacinto de' Sivo. Born from a family of long loyalty to the Bourbon dynasty, de 'Sivo was certainly a militant legitimist, enough to be arrested on September 14, 1860, for refusing to pay homage to Garibaldi. In 1861 he published his first historical essay Italy and its political drama in 1861 (L'Italia e il suo dramma politico nel 1861), in which he judged the unification process as elitist and distant from the interests of the people, led by gun violence and the spread of lies. As a result, and despite the risk of persecution and difficulty to find printers willing to print his testimony, the historian developed his most representative work, History of the Two Sicilies from 1847 to 1861 (Storia delle Due Sicilie dal 1847 al 1861), published in several volumes between 1862 and 1867.

In his works, he described the unification process as an assault against two sovereign states (the Two Sicilies and the Church), in violation of international law and in particular of the spiritual and civil values of the Neapolitan nation. The thought of de' Sivo was long the subject of ostracism, in spite of Benedetto Croce had highlighted his thickness as a scholar by writing a biography that was included in the work A family of patriots (Una famiglia di patrioti).

The years following the unification of Italy also saw the flowering of a vast literature of memoirs in which mainly ex-members of the dissolved Army of Two Sicilies brought their own interpretation of the facts. Among the numerous examples can be mentioned the brothers Pietro and Ludovico Quandel and Giuseppe Buttà. Chaplain of the 9th Battalion Hunters of the Bourbon Army, he was the author of A Journey from Boccadifalco to Gaeta (Un viaggio da Boccadifalco a Gaeta) (1875), autobiographical work that tells the story of the landing of the Expedition of the Thousand in Marsala until the Siege of Gaeta as viewed from the vanquisheds' side.

For a description of the events from his point of view Buttà resorted to a cutting language and a tone more sarcastic than de' Sivo's, also sparing no criticism against the Bourbon officers whom he accused of cowardice or treason against the crown. Despite the limitations resulting from transpositions of individual points of view, the memoirs are cited by many revisionist authors, which give them the value of historical documents.

=== Revisionist school ===
The revisionism of Risorgimento knew a clear radicalization and resumed in the mid-20th century, after the fall of the Savoy monarchy and that of fascism, for which the Risorgimento was considered an intangible myth. The changed political conditions allowed the emergence of a group of scholars which began re-examining the value of the House of Savoy work, and made largely negative reviews in that respect. About a hundred years after De' Sivo, the members of this group also took up the arguments of criticism, charging in particular to the process of national unification the cause of most problems of the Southern Italy.

The founder of this new culture is generally considered Carlo Alianello, who in his first novel, The Ensign (l'Alfiere) (1942) expressed a serious indictment to the creators and unification policies of the kingdom of Sardinia. For the ideas expressed in his work, which appeared in full fascist period, when the Risorgimento was considered a "intangible" myth, Alianello risked his confinement, which he managed to avoid only because of the fall of the regime. With the establishment of the Italian Republic Alianello could further develop his line of thought with the publication of The Legacy of the Prioress (L'eredità della Priora) (1963), considered by some his greatest work, and The Conquest of the South (La conquista del Sud) (1972), often referred to in the essay later revisionist works. In keeping with its 19th-century precursors, according to Alianello, the choices made in the unification process, as well as being totally alien to the needs of the Southern Italy, have been performed by the Piedmontese, with the complicity of the British government and masonry for the purpose of mere foreign occupation.

In the line of cultural descent, Michele Topa follows Carlo Alianello. By his works Thus ended the Bourbons of Naples (Così finirono i Borbone di Napoli) (1959) and The Brigands of His Majesty (I briganti di Sua Maestà) (1967), helped to outline a new historiographical conception of the Risorgimento, seen from the losers' standpoint.

Another leading and more intransigent figure of revisionism was Nicola Zitara. Along the same cultural lines of Alianello and Topa, the Calabrian writer considered Italy as the result of an operation of military conquest and economic damage to the South against which it would have been put in place an intricate plot. In her works, Zitara expresses his beliefs derived from an economic analysis conducted according to the canons of Marxist ideology.

Over the years, the revisionism of Risorgimento has found other supporters, both southern- and northern-born, which further in-depth research on the controversial events of the unification process. Among them we can mention Lorenzo Del Boca, Gigi Di Fiore, Francesco Mario Agnoli, Pino Aprile, Fulvio Izzo, Massimo Viglione, Antonio Ciano, Aldo Servidio, Roberto Martucci, Luciano Salera and Pier Giusto Jaeger.

=== Academic revisionism ===
Revisionism of Risorgimento is written about, albeit in different ways, by some academic authors, in most cases of non-Italian origin.

The best-known example is perhaps as the British historian Denis Mack Smith, whose work focuses on the history of Italy from the Risorgimento to the present day. He graduated at Cambridge, a member of the British Academy of Wolfson College (University of Cambridge), of All Souls College (Oxford University) and the American Academy of Arts and Sciences, he was a collaborator of Benedetto Croce and Grand Officer of the Order Merit of the Italian Republic.

In a series of essays, Mack Smith analyzed the most prominent figures of the unification process (Garibaldi, Cavour, Mazzini) and the circumstances in which they moved. In particular, in the book "Cavour and Garibaldi" (1954), he painted portraits of the two statists, which frankly differed by the hagiographic descriptions widely diffused in Italy. In particular, Garibaldi was called "moderate empirical and non-revolutionary", "cautious" and "statesman" and Cavour was severely criticized, being defined "dishonest", "awkward", "wrong", "clever" and stressing that he was determined to prevent the unification of Italy if there was any possibility that the merit of it could be attributed to radical, republican, democratic or popular forces. The House of Savoy, with particular reference to Vittorio Emanuele II, was harshly criticized by the historian in his book "The Savoia, Kings of Italy " (1990). The Unity monarch, contrary to the stereotype of the "gentleman King" has been described here as a character of low moral caliber (especially for the numerous extramarital affairs) and squanderer of public money. Elsewhere, the historian has pointed out as the first king of Italy considered that there were "only two ways to govern the Italians with bayonets or corruption" that contrary to the image of a constitutional monarch he believed this form of government unfit to Italians, and that he had secretly assured Metternich and the Pope was ready to intervene against the Roman Republic of Mazzini and restore the Pope's supremacy.

A distinctly different opinion was expressed by the scholar against Mazzini in the biography he dedicated to him, where the Italian thinker was positively judged because of the impulse given to the democratic life of the 19th century, with particular reference to the campaigns in favor of social security, universal suffrage and women's rights.

In his essay Documentary falsification and Italian biography, Mack Smith finally highlighted as the systematic destruction, rewriting in apologetic terms and concealment of official documents is a practice which all states are in danger of falling, but in some moments of Italian history this has been systematic. Citing specific examples referred to historical personages of great importance (Vittorio Emanuele II, Garibaldi, Lamarmora, Crispi) the historian provided many examples of manipulation of historical events for political use.

Another influential member of the academic revisionism is Christopher Duggan, a student of Mack Smith and Director of the Centre for the Advanced Study of Italian Society of the University of Reading.

In his work "The force of destiny – history of Italy from 1796 to today", Duggan expressed strong criticisms of the most popular historiography, with particular reference to the interpretation of the anti-unification movements in the South and of their repression. In particular, he reports that already in occasion of the massacre of Pontelandolfo and Casalduni voices like that of the Deputy Giuseppe Ferrari, who called what happened a real "civil war", were abruptly silenced, since according to the official interpretation "the "banditry" was responsible for violence in southern Italy and no one else".

According to the English scholar, the governments of the period after 1861 were obliged to represent the furious fighting that occurred in the former territories of the Kingdom of Two Sicilies as solely related to the common crime, as any other interpretation would have clashed sharply with the results of the "plebiscites" which spoke instead of a population unanimously in favor of unity. Duggan also said that efforts to credit the official version were blatantly contradicted by the facts since in 1864, no fewer than 100,000 soldiers (half of the entire Italian Army) were deployed in the South in an attempt to respond to rising.

He also identifies the ferocity with which the people fought the invaders as the primary cause of the mutual distrust between them and the northern Italians, and the origin of many prejudices. In addition, the historian says that several leading figures of the period helped to build and sustain the image of the South as a barbarous and uncultivated land. Among these Duggan recalls the case of Luigi Carlo Farini, sent to Naples as a governor in October 1860, that in writing to Cavour said that "but my friend, what are these countries (...)! What a barbarity! Other than Italy! This is Africa: the Bedouins, in response to these Caffoni are fine civic virtue". The historian reported that statements about the barbarism, ignorance, immorality, superstition, laziness and cowardice of the southern inhabitants were contained in numerous writings and records of the time, and that the same Cavour wrote in this regard that the South was corrupt "to the core".

According to Duggan, the substrate on which these statements were based was a mixture of "self-interest and fear". It was useful, in fact, to paint the southern territories as corrupt and backward, as this allowed the new government to justify the imposition of its own constitution and laws, administrative practices and men according to the approach of "piemontesizzazione". On the other hand, there was deep concern about the possibility of the spread of riots, which would have fragmented the country again, with unforeseeable consequences.

The historian writes that the alleged backwardness of the southern territories was instrumentally used to justify acts of flagrant lawlessness and violence. Over all, it is remembered the event involving the eminent Piedmontan General Giuseppe Govone, which was sent to Sicily with the task of rounding up conscripts and used of methods such as "putting cities under siege, cutting water supply and the kidnapping of women and children." In an attempt to justify his actions in Parliament, Govone made reference to the alleged "barbarism" of the territory, causing an outbreak of turmoil in the courtroom. Francesco Crispi, a Sicilian, challenged to a duel a prominent deputy of Northern origin and 21 Democrats, including Garibaldi himself, resigned.

Duggan also examines the problem of the number of those killed in the years after unification, citing Quintino Sella in what he calls a "real civil war". He makes a comparison between the official figures (5,200 killed in fighting between and executed in the period 1861–1865) and those calculated by using the local testimoniances and foreign press reports, which speak of tens of thousands (and up to 150,000) deaths. He believes these latest figures "unlikely but not impossible" because the very nature of the killings like that of Pontelandolfo makes no trace left of it in official documents.

The English historian criticizes the "transplant (to) the whole of Italy (with) the laws and institutions of the Piedmont" on the grounds that it was done "with so little consultation, and a callousness so fast and big, from seriously offending the sensibilities and local interests". If in fact, the Piedmont could claim a certain moral leadership as the only Italian state to have a constitution (but not the first, as the Kingdom of the Two Sicilies' Ferdinand II had in the first enactment of a Constitution in Italy), in other respects such as education, local government and justice, Lombardy, Tuscany and the Kingdom of the Two Sicilies had better credentials. Only recently, in fact, Piedmont had shed the reputation of being the "rear-most point of the peninsula".

In addition to the former Kingdom of Two Sicilies, a country of long legal tradition, the replacement of the existing codes with the Piedmont's laws caused extensive discontent in Tuscany, in particular the introduction of the death penalty, which did not exist in enlightened local legal traditions. Others widespread discontent was due to the introduction of the "prefects" as reference points of the system of local government. These were for many decades after the unification invariably of Northern or Piedmont origin, and invariably linked by relations of friendship with the Minister of Interior in key locations such as Milan, Florence, Naples and Palermo.

Harsh criticism is addressed by Duggan also to the pseudoscientific studies of Cesare Lombroso, whom he contemptuously calls "a man somewhat more confident that they have the solution of problems in Sicily (and indeed of all humanity)". The English scholar traces the origin of the racist theories of the physician from Verona to his experience in the army during the campaign against the so-called brigantaggio. Being appointed to carry out medical examinations to potential recruits, Lombroso examined and measured about 3,000 and then started to develop his ideas on the origins of delinquency. The first result of his thinking was an essay of 1864 on the connection between soldiers' tattoos and deviance. From this experience, and subsequent studies (see specific paragraph), Lombroso formulated the assumption that "violence was a good indicator of barbarism, barbarism, and in turn was a good indicator of racial degeneration" Such racist theories, which may include the view that the generally lower incidence of murders in the eastern half of Sicily was at the local presence of the "richest Aryan blood" have been branded by Duggan as "a paradigmatic example of the power of prejudice in shaping the supposed impartial observation".

Duggan turns his critical attention also to the construction of the mythology of the Risorgimento, as defined through the words of Francesco Crispi "religion of the country (which we need to give) the greatest solemnity, the maximum popularity".

British historian believes that the idealization of the unified movement was consciously pursued through the exaltation of the figures of Vittorio Emanuele II and Garibaldi, as a catalyst and homogenization of the various and often conflicting, monarchical and republican, federal and unitary, conservative and radicals trends. This myth was sustained by a steady stream of hagiographic literature, especially after the death of two characters (1878 and 1882, respectively) and an equally conspicuous and in many cases forced the construction of monuments.

This operation of iconification on a national scale had accents of the lowest level (such as the placing of plaques on sites in which Garibaldi had spent a few hours to take a bath) and even moments of blatant counterinformation. Duggan reports the case of serious Garibaldi's biography, written by Giuseppe Guerzoni in 1882, where next to the virtues he described Garibaldi's very human flaws. It was immediately branded as "too sophisticated" by Achille Bizzoni, who hastened to write to a watered down version "of the people use".

Duggan also shows that the work of construction of a mythology of the Risorgimento was also extended to the "nationalization" of school curricula in history, the teaching of which was to be made "so that prospective students absorbed by the history of Italy the love of country". Thus was a careful handling of textbooks, in which there had to be made any mention of the possibility of such figures as Cavour, or worse yet, Vittorio Emanuele, had not been in all respects of disinterested patriots.

In particular, for the protection of the latter, whenever a high political figure died, they proceeded to a careful examination of his papers and private correspondence with the king to expunge and secrete in the Royal Library any incriminating documents. Similarly, the correspondence of Cavour was heavily expurgated of the fierce hostility of Garibaldi and the democrats and phrases that were deeply offensive to Italians.

Another member of the academic revisionism is Martin Clark, professor of political history to the University of Edinburgh.

In his book "The Italian Risorgimento – still a controversial story" Clark says the non-sustainability of the "patriotic and progressive" vision of the unification process. British historian rejects the teleological view of the Risorgimento as an inevitable and finalistic process, considering it rather the correlation of different events, some of which random.

He denies that there was already an Italian nation since only a small elite had cultural awareness and pride in its historic past and felt that. He points out that only 2.5% of the population actually spoke Italian, and large parts of the inhabitants of the peninsula spoke local languages or dialects, and in any case, the Italian language "efined a cultural community, not a political one". The minority of people who felt they were Italian, also made up mostly of representatives from advocacy or by intellectuals from different fields, called for independence from foreign rulers, the Austrian Empire of all but not unification. The environment of the time, in fact, was strongly characterized by the presence of parochial diffuse tensions, the legacy of "Comuni Age" and never really dormant.

The researcher concludes that "patriotic interpretation of the Risorgimento is wrong, if only for the fact that the Italians were divided and not at all anxious to achieve national unity".

The British also recognized that academic scholars of the Southern School (Meridionalisti, see specific paragraph) have shown that the society of the ancient Kingdom of Two Sicilies was not stagnant, and some institutions strongly disputed by mainstream historians, such as estate, were not an index of socio-cultural backwardness but rather the "most appropriate response to the technological conditions and market circumstances". It was actually the customs and fiscal policies adopted by the new rulers that destroyed the southern economy.

Rigorous analyses of the Risorgimento were also conducted by Lucy Riall, a professor of history at Birkbeck College of University of London.
