= Giuseppe Ferrari (philosopher) =

Italian philosopher, historian and politician (1812–1876)

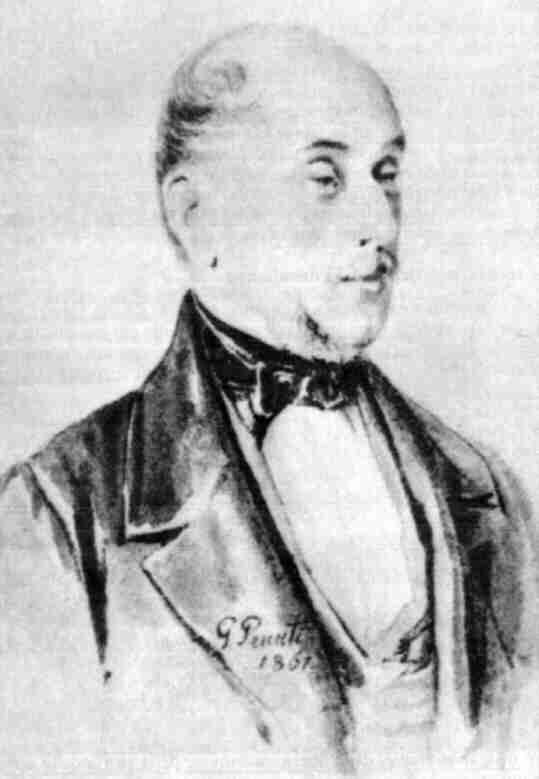
- Born: 7 March 1812; Milan
- Died: 2 July 1876 (aged 64); Rome
- Occupation: Politician

Giuseppe Ferrari (7 March 1812 – 2 July 1876) was an Italian philosopher, historian and politician.

== Biography ==
He was born at Milan, studied law at Pavia and graduated in 1831. A follower of Romagnosi and Giovan Battista Vico, his first works were an article in the Biblioteca Italiana ("Italian Library") entitled "Mente di Gian Domenico Romagnosi" (1835), and a complete edition of the works of Vico, prefaced by an appreciation (1865).

Finding Italy uncongenial to his ideas, he went to France and, in 1839, produced in Paris his Vico ci l'Italie, followed by La Nouvelle Religion de Campanella and La Théorie de l'erreur. On account of these works he was made Docteur ès lettres of the Sorbonne and professor of philosophy at Rochefort (1840). His views, however, provoked antagonism, and in 1842 he was appointed to the chair of philosophy at Strasbourg. After fresh trouble with the clergy, he returned to Paris and published a defence of his theories in a work entitled Idées sur la politique de Platon et d'Aristote. After a short connection with the college at Bourges, he devoted himself from 1849 to 1858 exclusively to writing. The works of this period are Les Philosophes Salariés, Machiavel juge des revolutions de notre temps (1849), La Federazione repubblicana (1851), La Filosofia della rivoluzione (1851), L' Italia dopo il colpo di Stato (1852), Histoire des révolutions, ou Guelfes et Gibelins (1858).

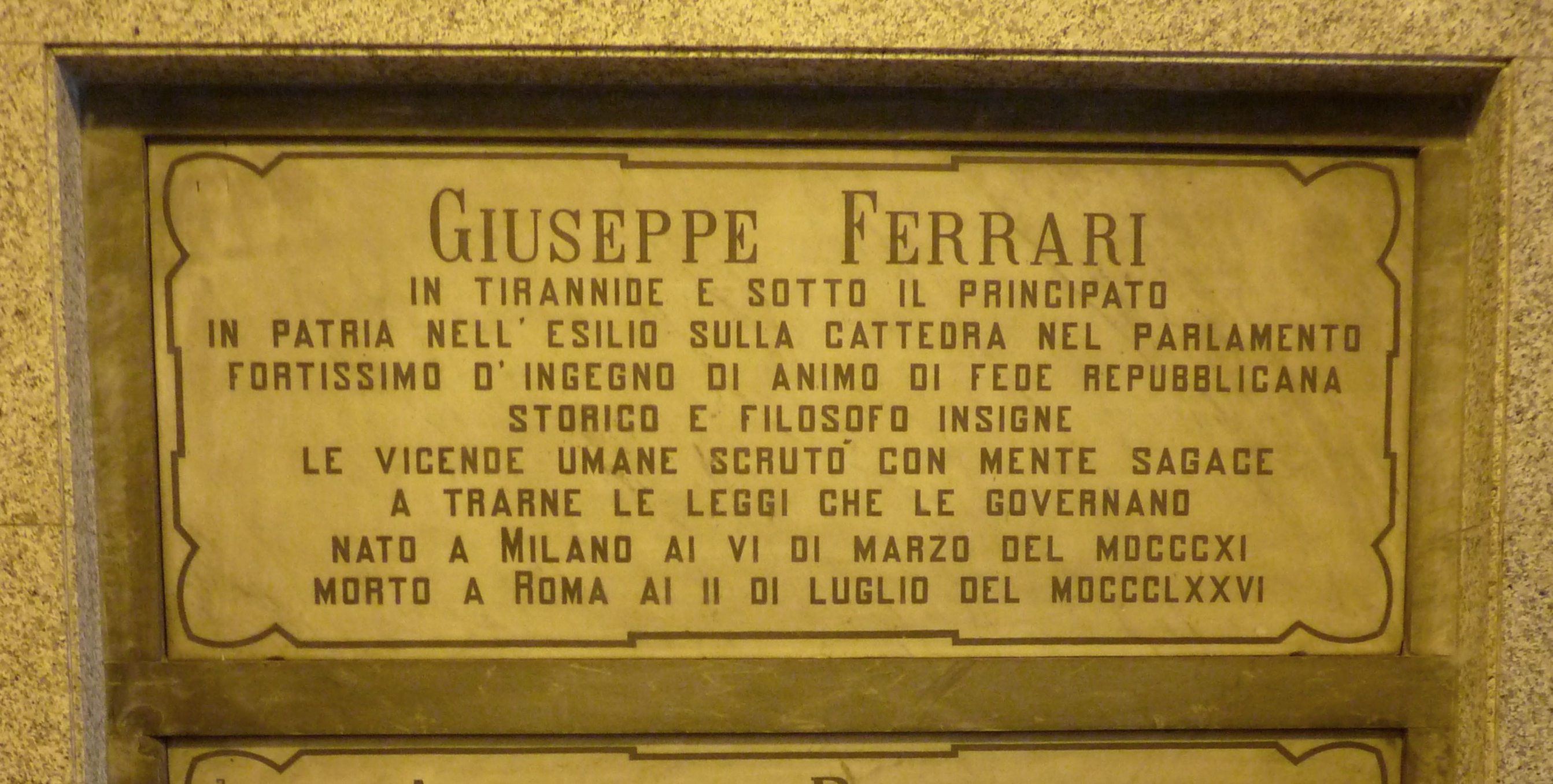
Ferrari's grave at the Monumental Cemetery of Milan, Italy

In 1859 he returned to Italy, where he opposed Cavour, and upheld federalism against the policy of a single Italian monarchy. In spite of this opposition, he held chairs of philosophy at Turin, Milan and Rome in succession, and during several administrations represented the college of Gavirate in the chamber. He was a member of the council of education and was made senator on 15 May 1876; but he died just six weeks later.

Amongst other works may be mentioned Histoire de la Raison d'État, Corso di storia degli scrittori politici italiani, and La China e l'Europa. In the last mentioned work, Ferrari anticipated the emergence of superpowers, arguing that their emergence would destroy European dominance in favor of Russia, America, and, eventually, China. A skeptic in philosophy and a revolutionist in politics, rejoicing in controversy of all kinds, he was admired as a man, as an orator, and as a writer.

== Works ==
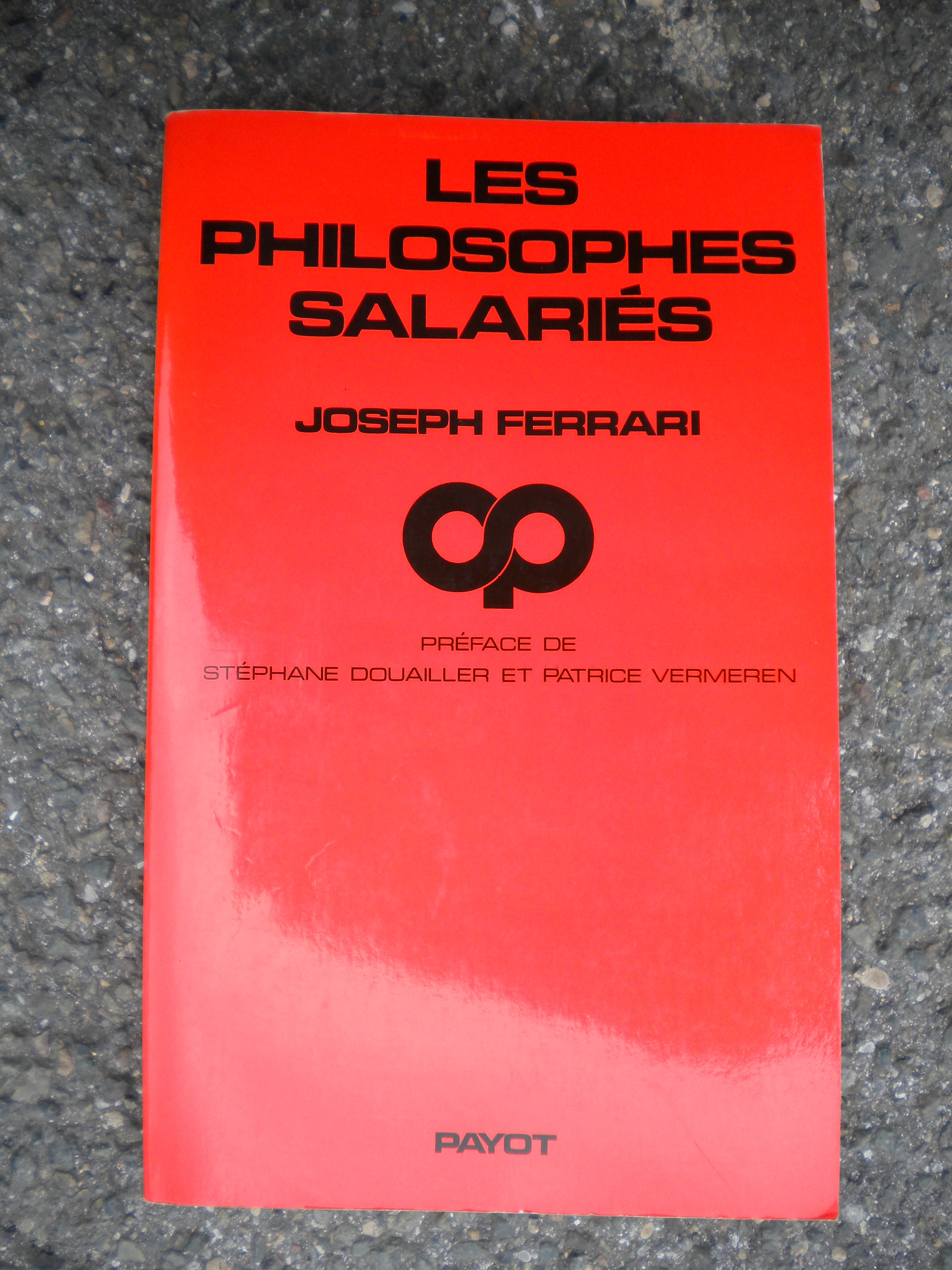
The cover of Les Philosophes Salariés, published in 1849

- 1835: La mente di G. D. Romagnosi,
- 1837: La mente di Vico,
- 1839: Vico et l'Italie,
- 1843: Essai sur le principe et les limites de la philosophie de l'histoire,
- 1844: La philosophie catholique en Italie,
- 1844–1845: La révolution et les révolutionnaires en Italie,
- 1845: Des idées et de l'école de Fourier depuis 1830,
- 1845: La révolution et les réformes en Italie,
- 1849: Machiavel juge des révolutions de notre temps,
- 1849: Les philosophes salariés,
- 1851: La Federazione repubblicana,
- 1851: Filosofia della rivoluzione,
- 1852: L'Italia dopo il colpo di Stato del 2 dicembre 1851,
- 1854: La mente di Giambattista Vico,
- 1856–1858: Histoire des révolutions d'Italie,
- 1860: Histoire de la raison d'État,
- 1860: L'annessione delle Due Sicilie,
- 1862: Corso sugli scrittori politici italiani,
- 1865: Il governo a Firenze,
- 1867: La Chine et l'Europe,
- 1868: La mente di Pietro Giannone,
- 1872: Storia delle Rivoluzioni d’Italia,
- 1874: Teoria dei periodi politici,
- 1875: Proudhon,
- 1929: Corso sugli scrittori politici italiani, prefazione di A. O. Olivetti,
- 1957: Opere di Giandomenico Romagnosi, Carlo Cattaneo e Giuseppe Ferrari, a cura di E. Sestan,
- 1961: Lettere di Ferrari a Proudhon (1854–1861) a cura di F. Della Peruta,
- 1973: Scritti politici, a cura di S. Rota Ghibaudi,
- 1988: I filosofi salariati, a cura di L. La Puma,
- 2006: Scritti di filosofia politica, a cura di M. Martirano,
- 2009: Il genio di Vico,
- 2009: Sulle opinioni religiose di Campanella

== Bibliography ==
- Romagnosi, Giandomenico; Ghiringhelli, Robertino; Invernici, Franco; Agnelli, Arduino; Università di Milano; Centro studi Romagnosi (1982). Per conoscere Romagnosi (in Italian). Milan: Unicopli. ISBN 978-88-7061-740-5.
- Ferrari, A. (1914). Giuseppe Ferrari, Saggio critico (in Italian). Bruylant.
- Frigerio, F. (1994). "Giuseppe Ferrari". Dictionnaire international du fédéralisme (in French). Bruylant. ISBN 978-2-8027-0913-8.
- Martirano, Maurizio (2001). Giuseppe Ferrari editore e interprete di Vico (in Italian). A. Guida. ISBN 978-88-7188-494-3.
- Monti, Antonio (1925). Giuseppe Ferrari e la politica interna della destra (in Italian). Edizioni "Risorgimento".
- Panizza, G. (1980). L'illuminismo critico di Giuseppe Ferrari (in Italian). Bruylant.
- Ghibaudi, Silvia Rota (1969). Giuseppe Ferrari: L'evoluzione del suo pensiero (1838-1860) (in Italian). L. S. Olschki.
- Rota Ghibaudi, S.; Ghiringhelli, T. (1992). Giuseppe Ferrari e il nuovo Stato italiano (convegno internazionale, Luino, 5-6 ottobre 1990) (in Italian). Cisalpino. ISBN 978-88-205-0692-6.
- Schiattone, Mario (1996). Alle origini del federalismo italiano: Giuseppe Ferrari (in Italian). EDIZIONI DEDALO. ISBN 978-88-220-6180-5.
