= Aix-en-Diois =

- Part of Solaure-en-Diois
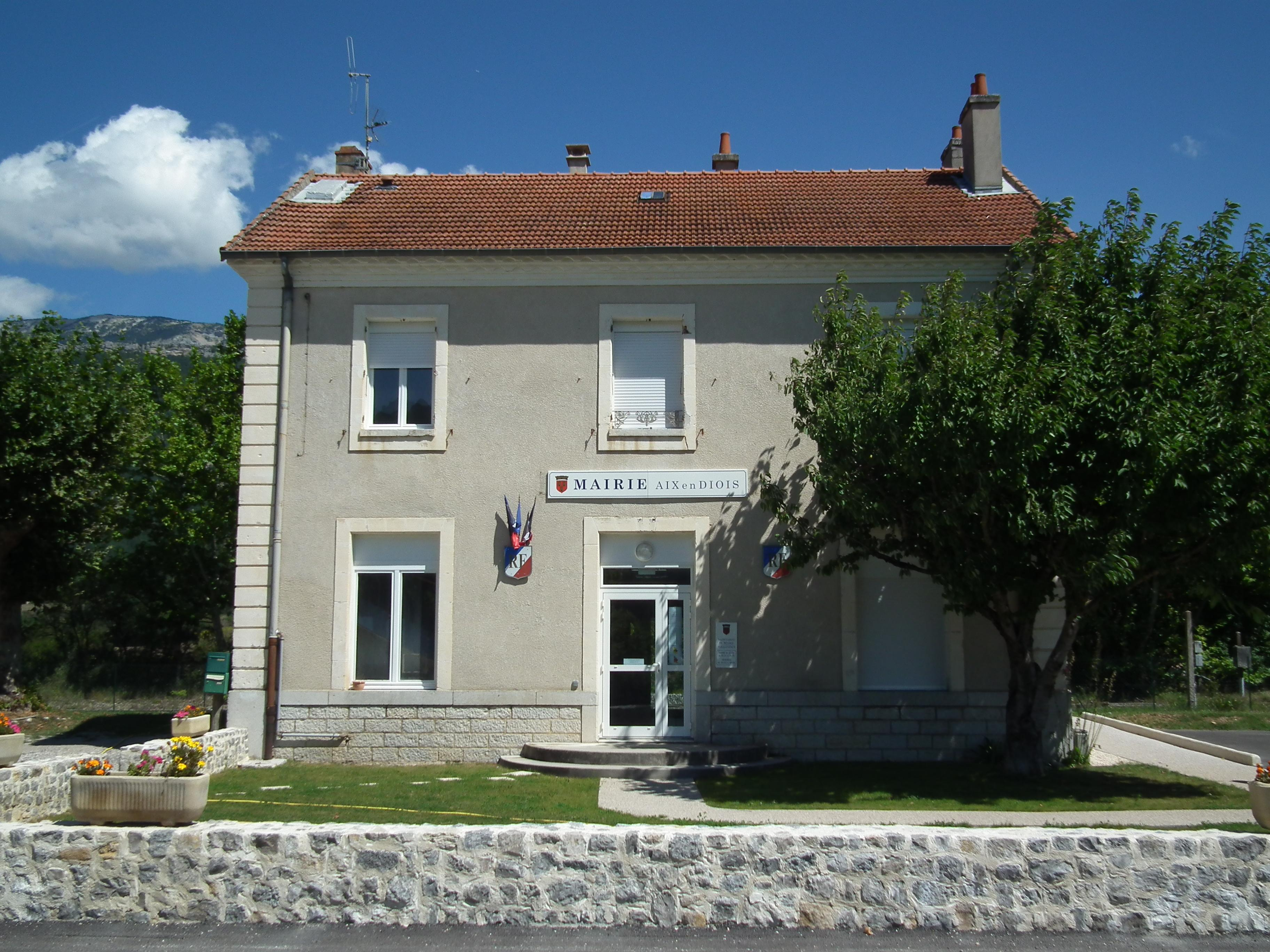
- The former mairie of Aix-en-Diois
- Location of Aix-en-Diois
- Location within France Location within Auvergne-Rhône-Alpes
- Coordinates: 44°42′38″N 5°24′07″E
- Country: France
- Region: Auvergne-Rhône-Alpes
- Department: Drôme
- Arrondissement: Die
- Canton: Le Diois
- Commune: Solaure-en-Diois
- Area^{1}: 16.49 km^{2} (6.37 sq mi)
- Elevation: 444 m (1,457 ft)
- Highest elevation: 1,259 m (4,131 ft)
- Lowest elevation: 433 m (1,421 ft)
- Population (2021): 331
  - Density: 20.1/km^{2} (52.0/sq mi)
- Time zone: UTC+01:00 (CET)
  - Summer (DST): UTC+02:00 (CEST)
- Postal code: 26150
- ^{1} French Land Register data, which excludes lakes, ponds, glaciers > 1 km^{2} (0.386 sq mi or 247 acres) and river estuaries.

Aix-en-Diois (French pronunciation: [ɛks ɑ̃ diwa]; Vivaro-Alpine: Ais de Diés) is a former commune in the Drôme department in southeastern France. On 1 January 2016, it was merged into the new commune Solaure-en-Diois.

== History ==
Aix-en-Diois belonged to the counts and later to the bishops of Die (twelfth century). Later, it belonged to the Princes of Orange, and finally to the La Tour du Pin family (seventeenth century). The commune contains the remains of Roman baths and the ruins of a 13th-century medieval castle with a polygonal enclosure and corner towers, rebuilt in the 16th century. The castle hall dates from the 17th century and is the former summer residence of the Bishop of Die. The main church is the Church of the Immaculate Conception.

== Population ==
Historical population
Year	Pop.	±% p.a.
2006	330	—
2011	357	+1.59%
2021	331	−0.75%
Source: INSEE

== See also ==
- Communes of the Drôme department
