= Monte Battaglia =

Mountain in Emilia-Romagna, Italy

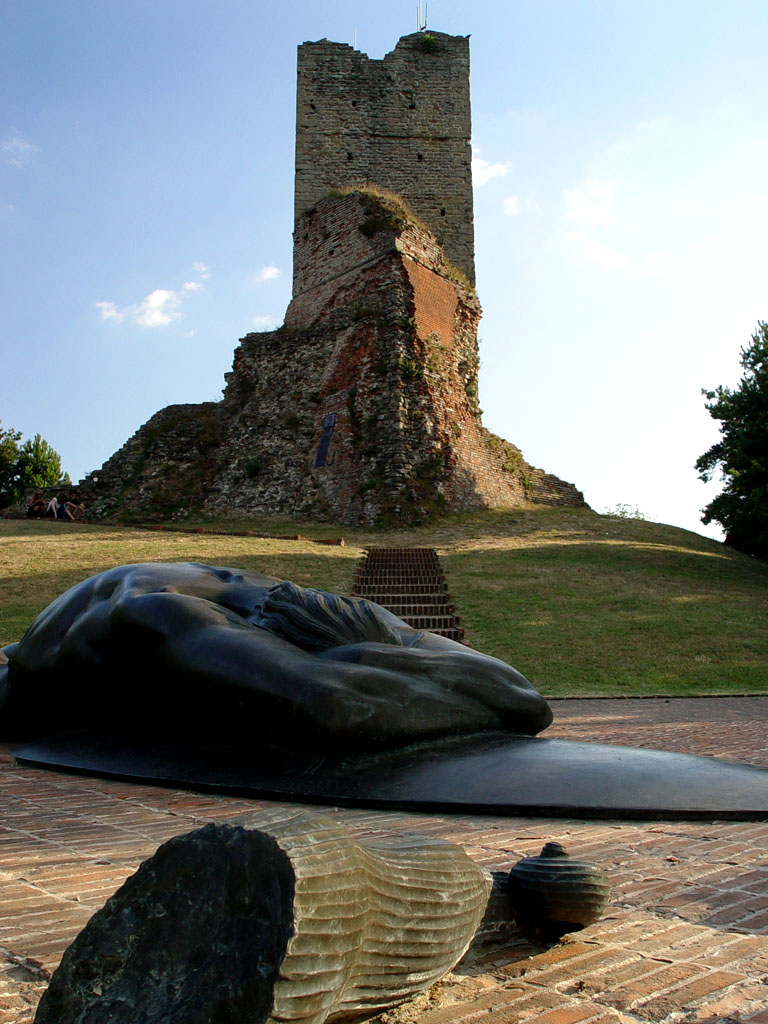
- The fortress of Monte Battaglia and the monument to peace among peoples

Highest point
- Elevation: 715 m (2,346 ft)
- Prominence: 116 m (381 ft)
- Coordinates: 44°13′05″N 11°34′47″E

Geography
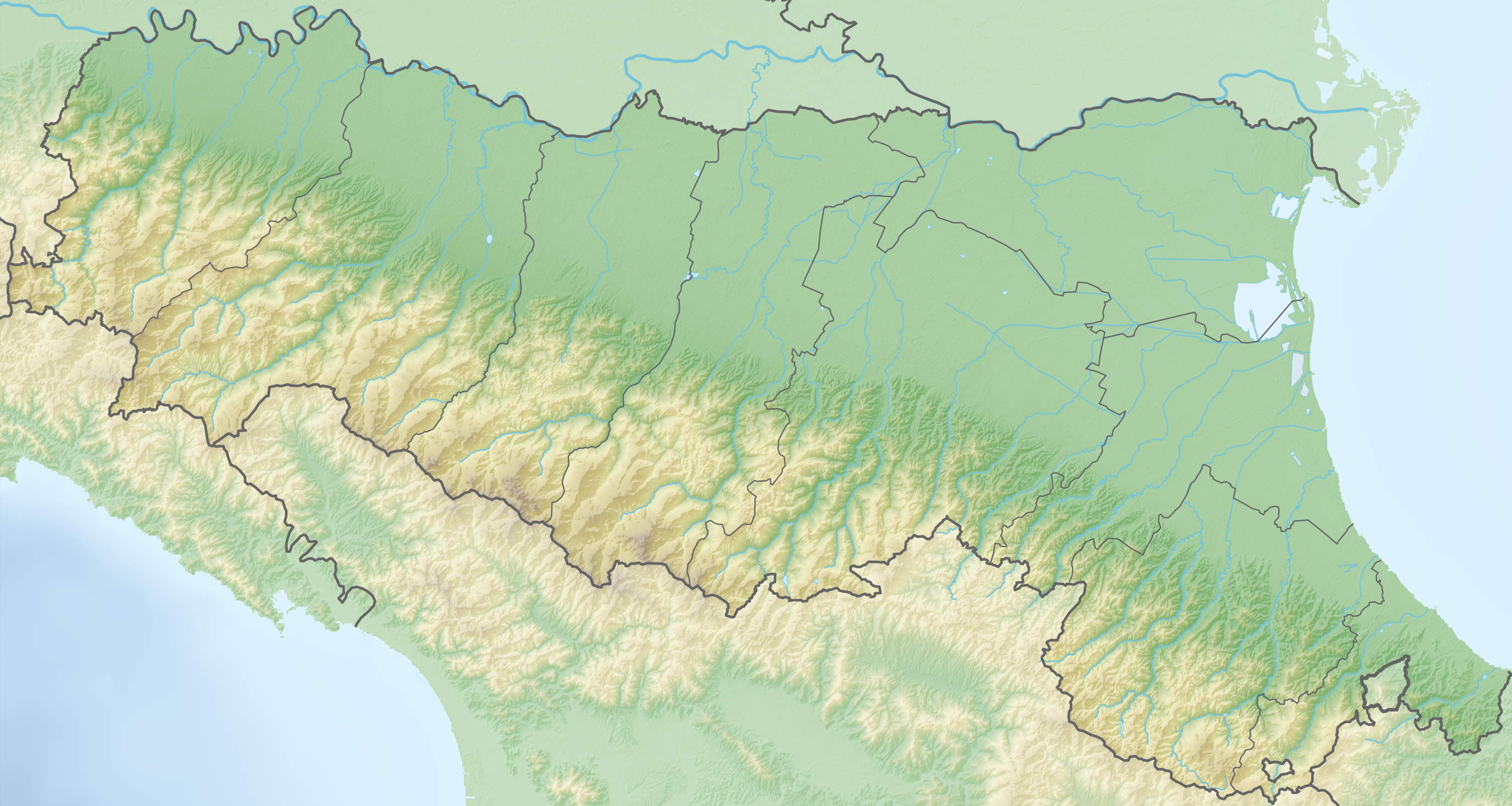
- Location within Emilia-Romagna Location within Italy
- Country: Italy
- Province: Ravenna
- Region: Emilia-Romagna
- Parent range: Tuscan-Emilian Apennines

Monte Battaglia is a hill located in the territory of the municipality of Casola Valsenio (Ravenna), in the Tuscan-Emilian Apennines. The toponym, attested in the Middle Ages as "Monte de Batalla" or "Montis Battagliae," has uncertain origins: according to some scholars it refers to a great battle that was fought there between the Goths and Byzantines in the 6th century, while according to others its origin dates back to the time of Lombard domination (7th-8th centuries) and the term "battaglia" would be an alteration of the Lombard "pataia," meaning "rag," or "piece of cloth that flutters".

== History ==
The tower dates back to the Lombard era and was erected on the high ground (715 m a.s.l.), part of the defensive line along the ridge between the Senio and the Santerno, on the borders between the territories occupied by this people and those still in possession of the Byzantine exarchate. The position of Mount Battaglia later continued to represent the focal point of the military arrangements placed to control and defend the valleys of the two rivers and the plain between Imola and Faenza.

The "castrum de Monte de Battalla" is first attested in a document of 1154, belonging to Imola. In 1390, the senate of Bologna, to whom it had come into possession, decreed the destruction of the fortress: the task was entrusted to Ugolino di Boccadiferro with 500 warriors.

In 1392 it was in the possession of the Alidosi, who restored the fortress, and then passed to Guidantonio Manfredi of Faenza. The latter's son, Taddeo, lord of Imola, strengthened it against the conquest attempts of his uncle Astorgio, who nevertheless seized it in 1462 by a stratagem, only to be forced to return it.

The fortress later passed to Girolamo Riario and, from him, to Caterina Sforza, lady of Imola. In 1494 a bastion was built leaning against the north side of the tower which is still preserved today, the work of Bruchello, a stonemason. In 1502 the fortress was conquered by Cesare Borgia, but two years later it was already under the rule of Venice, and in 1505 it returned to the possession of the Holy See in whose name the city of Imola kept a "castellan" there. In October 1506 Pope Julius II passed through it on his way to Imola.

During the 16th century, the fortified works were superseded by the evolution of military technology, and Monte Battaglia also lost importance and prestige, so much so that in 1601 the city of Imola found no one willing to take on the position of castellan. A Franciscan hermitage was briefly housed there, and in 1640 Imola required Casola Valsenio, in whose territory the fortress was located, to keep an armed guard there. However, the inhabitants of Casola obtained permission to demolish the fortifications, and the building fell into neglect. A 1757 notice forbade the "carrying away of stones, fragments, and other things of the said fortress and tower."

After the unification of Italy, the fortress became a refuge for brigands, usually former smugglers, who had operated between the Papal States and the Grand Duchy of Tuscany. At the end of the century, it was occupied by a family of sharecroppers, who used some rooms located between the tower and the walls on the southeastern side. This was succeeded by another farming family, which finally abandoned it in 1942.

=== The 1944 battle ===
On 24 September 1944, a partisan battalion of the 36th Garibaldi Brigade, 250 men strong and divided into six companies, operating in the Imola and Faenza Apennines, began an infiltration movement that led it to occupy Mount Battaglia on the morning of the 27th. On the same morning, a group of partisans engaged the German units defending the summit of Mount Carnevale. On the other side of the mountain, unbeknownst to the partisans, soldiers of the 350th regiment of the U.S. 88th Infantry Division (Blue Devils), engaged in the breakthrough of the Gothic Line, were operating from south to north following the watershed between the Senio and Santerno rivers. After the encounter, on the afternoon of the 27th the Americans were driven to Mt. Battaglia. The mountain had already hosted a nucleus of partisans and draft dodgers in the winter of 1943, but had not been deemed a cause for concern by the fascists. This time, however, given also the proximity to the front line, having arrived on the mount, the partisans had to withstand in the rain an attack by the 290th German Grenadier Regiment, with members of the 44th and 715th Divisions, which were repelled also with the help of three companies of the Blue Devils.

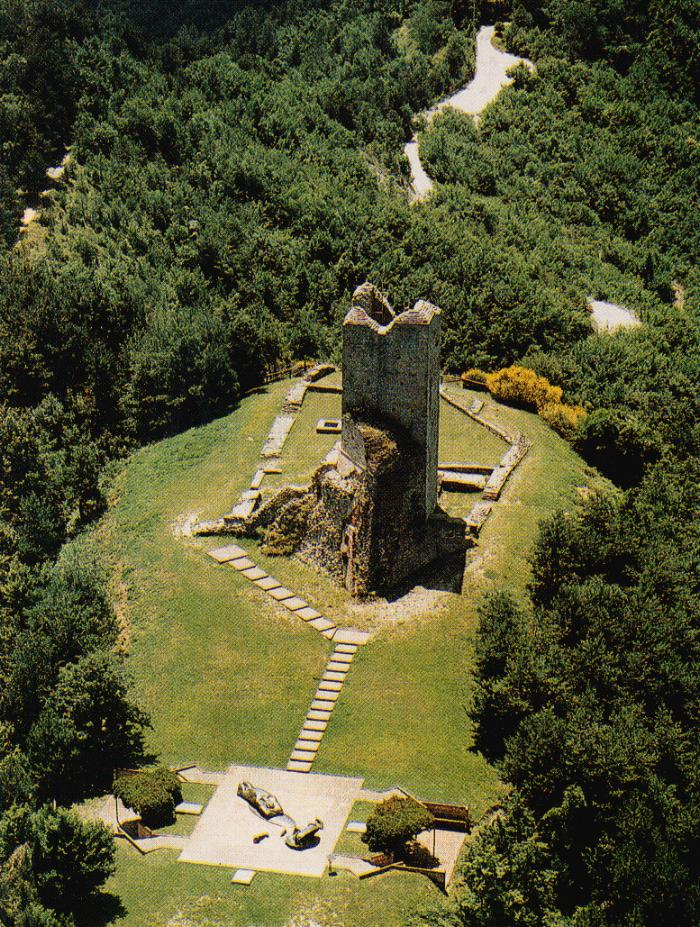
Aerial view of the fortress of Monte Battaglia

The fighting continued for another five days, but the Germans, despite reinforcements called up from the Adriatic front and help also obtained from forces of the Republic of Salò were again pushed back with heavy losses. The fighting sustained by the partisan brigade alongside the U.S. Army was an episode of high strategic and military value as part of the liberation of Italy from the Nazi-Fascists. The 350th regiment of the 88th division took the name "Mount Battaglia".

On 3 October, the U.S. Army gave way to the 1st Welsh Guards Brigade, which, until 11 October, faced the last German assaults. The fighting was particularly bloody, but the sacrifice of lives, with over 2,000 killed, did not bring immediate effects: despite the fact that the conquest of Monte Battaglia opened the way to the Po Valley, the Allied advance was halted, for reasons of military and political strategy, until the spring of the following year.

As a result of the fighting and the intense use of artillery, the remains of the fortress of Mount Battaglia were destroyed: only a trunk of the tower and a spur of the city wall remained, which then collapsed immediately after the war.

The final Allied offensive was launched in April 1945. The Senio Valley was liberated by the "Friuli" Combat Group, framed in the British 10th Army Corps. For the sacrifices of its people and its activity in the partisan struggle, Casola Valsenio was awarded the War Cross of Military Valor.

== Restoration ==
In 1973 a day of studies on Monte Battaglia, organized by the Pro Loco of Casola Valsenio, drew attention to the ruins of the tower, emphasizing its character as the male of a fortress, and not as an isolated tower. In 1982 the municipality of Casola Valsenio, to whom the area was ceded, began the recovery of the area with a campaign of archaeological excavations that brought to light materials from the 15th and 16th centuries: among them, plates and jugs of engraved maiolica, glazed pots, spear and crossbow heads and several fake coins, enough to speculate on the presence of a clandestine mint between 1510 and 1530, a period of temporary abandonment. Restoration work was conducted between 1985 and 1987. The wooden floors inside the tower were rebuilt and the battered masonry parts were patched up; the wall enclosure was also consolidated. In 1988, in commemoration of the World War II battle, the "Monument to Resistance, Liberation and Peace Among Peoples," a bronze work by sculptor Aldo Rontini, depicting the biblical episode of David and Goliath, symbolizing the liberation struggle and subsequent pacification, was also unveiled. Further restoration work on the fortress was carried out between 2007 and 2008. The monumental architectural complex can be visited all year round.

From the top of Mount Battaglia during clear days one can overlook the entire Romagna plain to the Adriatic Sea. Towards the mountains one will be able to see in the distance, San Marino to the east, Mount Cimone to the west, the Euganean Hills and the Eastern Alps to the northeast.

== Relevant events ==
- In 1950 on the tenth anniversary of the resistance, a symbolic cemetery created by Professor Augusto Rinaldi Ceroni was inaugurated.
- In 1988, three memorial plaques were unveiled in memory of American and British partisans and soldiers.
- In 1990 a plaque was unveiled in memory of the British 1st Guards Brigade.
- In 1998, a plaque in memory of the fallen German soldiers was uncovered in the base of the eastern spur of the fortress.
- In October 1998 a Borgo Tossignano researcher named Renzo Grandi found a few meters from the tower, the remains of American infantryman Harry Castilloux killed by enemy bombs on October 4, 1944. In addition to the human remains, a dog tag and a photograph of a girl (presumed to be his fiancée) were found.
- In October 2001, on the same occasion and as a sign of peace and reconciliation, Welsh Guards and Germans from the 305th Infanteriedivision came to visit Mount Battaglia.
- In September 2004 all the main armed forces of the time came to visit the fortress at the invitation of the Municipality of Casola Valsenio on the occasion of the 60th anniversary of the war events of September/October 1944. Also in the same year, a plaque was unveiled in memory of the First British Division at Mount Cece (759 m a.s.l.), the site of many battles, which is located not far from Mount Battaglia, also in the territory of the municipality of Casola Valsenio.
- On 2 September 2012, information panels on the history of Mt. Battaglia from prehistoric times to the present day were unveiled.

== Other media ==
A video game entitled Medal of Honor: Breakthrough, produced by EA Games, was released in September 2003; this game is set in Italy, specifically in Cassino and Monte Battaglia.

== See also ==
- Casola Valsenio
- Province of Ravenna
