= Rouvroy =

Rouvroy may refer to:

== Places ==
- Rouvroy, Belgium, a municipality in Wallonia, Belgium
- Rouvroy, Aisne, a commune in the Aisne département in France
- Rouvroy, Pas-de-Calais, a commune in the Pas-de-Calais département in France
- Rouvroy-en-Santerre, commune near Amiens, France
- Rouvroy-sur-Serre commune in the Aisne département in France
- Rouvroy-sur-Audry commune in the Ardennes department in France
- Rouvroy-Ripont commune in the Marne department in France

== House of Rouvroy ==
- Claude de Rouvroy, duc de Saint-Simon (1607–1693), 1st Duke
- Louis de Rouvroy, duc de Saint-Simon (1675–1755), 2nd Duke
- Claude-Charles de Rouvroy (1695–1760), Bishop of Metz
- Charles François de Rouvroy (1727–1794), Bishop of Agde
- Claude-Anne de Rouvroy de Saint Simon (1743–1819), Spanish Captain-General
- Claude Henri de Rouvroy, comte de Saint-Simon (1760–1825), a French utopian socialist thinker.
