= Duke of Saint-Simon =

French and Spanish title (1635–1755)

Dukedom of Saint-Simon
- Creation date: 1635
- Created by: Louis XIII
- Peerage: Peerage of France; Peerage of Spain
- First holder: Claude de Rouvroy
- Last holder: Louis de Rouvroy
- Extinction date: 1755

Duke of Saint-Simon (French: duc de Saint-Simon; Spanish: duque de Saint-Simon) was a title in the Peerage of France and later in the Peerage of Spain. It was granted in 1635 to Claude de Rouvroy, comte de Rasse. The title's name refers to the seigneury that was held by the Rouvroy family at Saint-Simon in Aisne.

The dukedom passed from father to son in 1693. The second and last holder of the title, Louis de Rouvroy, has been immortalized as one of the greatest memoirists in European history.

The second duke's two sons both predeceased him, making the French dukedom extinct in 1755. However, the second duke’s title had been introduced into the Spanish peerage and granted Grandee status when he was ambassador there. This meant that the Spanish Dukedom of Saint-Simon could be inherited through the female line, and descendants continued to use this title until the 19th century.

== French Dukes of Saint-Simon (1635-1755) ==
From	To	Duke of Saint-Simon
1635	1693	Claude de Rouvroy, duc de Saint-Simon (1607–1693)
1693	1755	Louis de Rouvroy, duc de Saint-Simon (1675–1755)

== Spanish Dukes of Saint-Simon (1814-1865) ==
From	To	Duke of Saint-Simon
1814	1819	Claude-Anne de Rouvroy de Saint Simon (1743–1819)
1819	1865	Hubert Jean Victor, Marquis de Saint-Simon (1782–1865)

== See also ==
- Charles François de Rouvroy (1727–1794), bishop of Agde.
- Henri de Saint-Simon (1760–1825), Political philosopher, nephew of Charles François de Rouvroy.
