= Gundermann (disambiguation) =

Gerhard Gundermann (1955–1998) was a German singer-songwriter and rock musician.

Gundermann may also refer to:

- Gotthold Gundermann (1856–1921), German classical philologist
- Karsten Gundermann (born 1966), German composer
- Romy Gundermann (1933–2019), German soprano
- Gundermann (film), a 2018 German film

== See also ==
- Gudermann
- Gunderman, a hamlet in New South Wales, Australia
