= Jean de Rovroy =

French theologian and priest

Lucius Caecilius Metellus embarking elephants on Sicily, from KBR 10475, a copy of Jean's translation of the Strategemata

Jean de Rovroy (died 10 July 1461) was a French theologian and priest. He defended the doctrine of the Immaculate Conception at the Council of Basel in 1433–1436. Three of his writings on this theme survive, all in Latin, but he is best known for his translation into French of the Latin Strategemata of Frontinus for King Charles VII of France.

== Life ==
Jean's surname is spelled many different ways in the sources. It may refer to one of the places known as Rouvroy, but it is impossible to know which one. In 1388, Jean was a student at the College of Navarre in Paris. He would have been around fifteen years old at the time, born about 1373. In 1403, he signed a petition addressed to King Charles VI on behalf of the masters of arts of Paris. In 1404, he was a secretary of Louis I, Duke of Orléans. The assassination of Louis in 1407 sent him back to school. He read the Sentences in 1408 and by 1413 was a bachelor of theology. He opposed Jean Petit's defence of tyrannicide. He had obtained his masters in theology by 1416. In October 1416, he was named master of the Collège Fortet on the condition that he take holy orders, being then only a subdeacon.

France had been embroiled in a civil war since 1407. In 1418, with a series of massacres, the Burgundian party seized control of Paris. When the university decided to collaborate with the new authorities, Jean, who favoured the Armagnacs, left the city to follow the Dauphin Charles, after 1422 King Charles VII. From 1425, Jean was the curate of Saint-Pierre-le-Guillard in Bourges. In 1426, he was a conseiller du roi (royal councilor). He held a curacy in Vierzon, probably only temporarily. He applied that year for a canonry in the Sainte-Chapelle of Bourges, but it was only through the intervention of the king and Gérard Machet that he was able to obtain it by 1429. There are eight letters either addressed to Jean or about him in Machet's letter collection. He received a dispensation from the obligation of residence. In 1432, he acquired a benefice from Le Puy Cathedral and was probably appointed treasurer. At some point before 1434, he acquired the parish of Saint-Gervais in Paris.

Jean's sermon for Corpus Christi

Jean attended the Council of Basel between November 1433 and July 1436. In documents relating to the council, his name is often misspelled Romiceyo or Romiroy. On 16 June 1435, he preached a sermon before the council for the Feast of Corpus Christi. On 8 December, he preached a sermon when the council celebrated the Feast of the Immaculate Conception. He was one of four members appointed to a commission to debate the doctrine of the Immaculate Conception in March 1436. He and Pierre Porcher (later replaced by John of Segovia) argued the case in favour, while Juan de Torquemada and John of Ragusa argued the case against. In 1439, the council pronounced in favour of the doctrine.

Between 1437 and 1441, Jean does not seem to have been resident in Bourges. In January 1437, he was in the service of Charles I, Duke of Bourbon. In 1439 or perhaps a bit later, he returned to Paris as dean of theology, probably for a short time. In September 1442, he received a "free" prebend of the cathedral of Bourges, an upgrade from the regular prebend he had held since 1425. In 1451, he was living the royal palace in Bourges. In 1453, his house is described as being next to the house of Jacques Cœur. He was the vicar general of the archdiocese of Reims under Archbishop Jean II Jouvenal des Ursins (r. 1449–1473). In 1460, Jean resigned his canonry in Sainte-Chapelle. He remained active in the cathedral of Bourges until his death on 10 July 1461, when he would have been well over eighty years old. He was succeeded in his cathedral canonry by another Jean, son of Guillaume Jouvenal des Ursins.

== Work ==
=== Le livre des stratagèmes ===
First page in BnF fr. 1233

Le livre des stratagèmes, Jean's translation of the Strategemata, was relatively popular in its day, being preserved in at least seven manuscripts, all of the 15th century. His is the earliest vernacular translation of Frontinus to survive, the translation ordered from Jaume Domènec by King Peter IV of Aragon in 1377 being lost. As a translation from the classical Latin of the first century AD, Jean's Stratagèmes is one of the only truly humanist works produced in France during the reign of Charles VII.

Le livre des stratagèmes is dedicated to Charles VII. It was probably translated early in his reign, which began in 1422, as a practical treatise on warfare for the inexperienced ruler of a kingdom at war. The prologue found in two manuscripts, however, seems to indicate that Jean was already a canon of Sainte-Chapelle and dean of the University of Paris at the time, which corresponds to a much later date. The prologue, however, may be a late addition.

Manuscripts of the Stratagèmes include:

- Brussels, KBR, 10475
- Geneva, Bibliothèque de Genève, français, 171
- Paris, Bibliothèque nationale de France, Arsenal, 2693
- Paris, Bibliothèque nationale de France, français, 1233
- Paris, Bibliothèque nationale de France, français, 1234
- Paris, Bibliothèque nationale de France, français, 1235
- Paris, Bibliothèque nationale de France, français, 24357
- Aberystwyth, National Library of Wales, 23205D
- London, British Library, Add. 12028

Four of these manuscripts (Arsenal 2693, Fr. 1234, Fr. 1235, Add. 12028) contain aucuns notables extraitz du livre de Vegece, that is, translated extracts from the first three books of Vegetius's De re militari. The evidence of vocabulary suggests that they may have been translated by Jean de Rovroy.

=== Theological writings ===
Jean also wrote three theological works in Latin around the time of the council of Basel. His sermon for 8 December 1435, Ego mater pulchrae dilectionis, is preserved without his name in a single manuscript. The basic ideas in the sermon are developed further in the treatise Sapientia aperuit ora mutorum, written for the commission at Basel. It argues for the Immaculate Conception from the Church Fathers, the Bible, reason and, especially, miracles. He read an edited down version of this treatise before the council on 21 April 1436. This work, Tota pulchra es, was published in 1664.
