= Marie-Christine de Rouvroy de Saint-Simon =

- Countess of Valentinois; Countess of Rasse
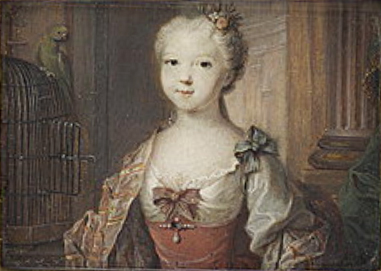
- Born: 7 May 1728; Paris, Kingdom of France
- Died: 4 July 1774 (aged 46); Paris, Kingdom of France
- Noble family: House of Rouvroy de Saint-Simon
- Spouses: Charles-Maurice Goyon de Matignon; Chevalier de Monaco (m. 1749–1766)
- Father: Jacques-Louis de Rouvroy, Duke of Saint-Simon
- Mother: Catherine-Charlotte-Thérèse de Gramont
- Occupation: Writer, lady-in-waiting

Marie-Christine de Rouvroy de Saint-Simon (7 May 1728 – 4 July 1774), known as "Mademoiselle de Ruffec," was the granddaughter of the memoirist Saint-Simon.

In 1749, she became Countess of Valentinois through her marriage to Charles-Maurice Goyon de Matignon, Count of Valentinois. In 1754, she became Countess of Rasse and a Grandee of Spain upon the death of her uncle, Jean-Armand de Rouvroy de Saint-Simon.

== Biography ==
=== Family ===
Born on May 7, 1728, Marie-Christine was the granddaughter of the memoirist Louis de Rouvroy, Duke of Saint-Simon. She was the daughter of his eldest son, Jacques-Louis de Rouvroy (1698–1746), Duke of Saint-Simon by gift inter vivos, known as the "Duke of Ruffec", and his wife Catherine-Charlotte-Thérèse de Gramont (1707–1755). Jacques-Louis died in 1746. His brother, Jean-Armand (1699–1754), Count of Rasse, Grandee of Spain, became Duke of Saint-Simon. Since his father was still alive, Jean-Armand was in turn called the "Duke of Ruffec".

=== Marriage ===
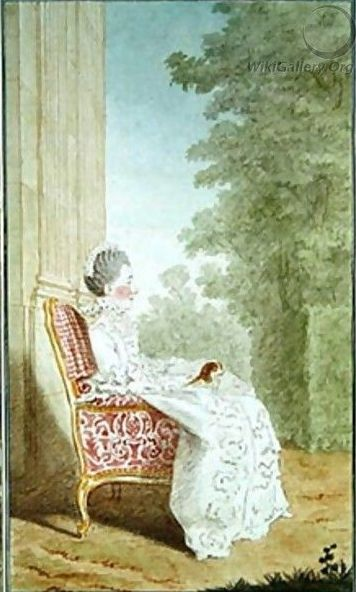
The Countess of Valentinois, by Carmontelle

On December 10, 1749, in the chapel of the Hôtel de Saint-Simon in Paris (with the approval of King Louis XV, dated November 1), Marie-Christine married Charles-Maurice Goyon de Matignon, known as "the Chevalier de Monaco," Count of Valentinois, descended from the Grimaldi family through his mother, and brother of the sovereign Prince Honoré III of Monaco. Jacques, Duke of Valentinois, Marie-Christine's father-in-law, gifted her the Hôtel de Valentinois in Passy.

=== Grandee of Spain ===
In 1752, her uncle Jean-Armand made Marie-Christine his sole heir. He died in 1754, and Marie-Christine became Countess of Rasse and Grandee of Spain of the first class. In the House of Saint-Simon, in fact, the title of Grandee passed to women, in the absence of men. A few years earlier, in his Memoirs, Marie-Christine's grandfather had mentioned instances of Grandeeships that substituted, "in a few houses or on uncommon occasions, for the paternal uncle to the niece." Charles-Maurice became Grandee of Spain of the first class, jure uxoris. Since 1701, Grandees of Spain in France had "the rank, honors, treatment, and distinctions of dukes." On June 4, 1754, as a Grandee of Spain, the Countess had the honor of greeting Louis XV and Queen Marie Leszczyńska. She was entitled to the stool. In 1755, upon the death of her grandfather, the memoirist, she inherited the Château de la Ferté-Vidame.

On October 27, 1762, she was appointed lady-in-waiting to Mesdames. In December, she sold her estate in Ruffec to Charles-François de Broglie. On June 21, 1764, she sold her château de La Ferté-Vidame to the financier Jean-Joseph de Laborde.

The Count and Countess of Valentinois had no children and separated in 1766. In 1770, Marie-Christine was appointed dame d'atours (lady of the wardrobe) to the Countess of Provence, and was later promoted to dame d'honneur (lady of honour) in 1772. She died in Paris on 15 July 1774, bequeathing the Hôtel de Valentinois to her cousin, Count Jacques de Stainville.
