= Charles-Maurice of Monaco, Count of Valentinois =

Charles-Maurice of Monaco
- Count of Valentinois
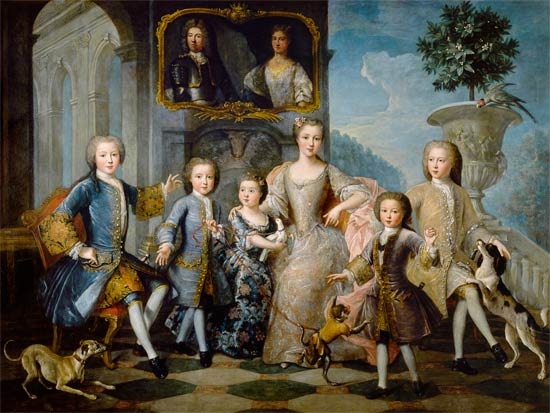
- The Family of the Duke of Valentinois, Pierre Gobert. Charles-Maurice is seen playing with a monkey.
- Born: Charles-Maurice Grimaldi; May 14, 1727; Paris, France
- Died: January 18, 1798 (aged 70); Maury, Switzerland
- Spouse: Marie-Christine de Rouvroy de Saint-Simon (m. 1749; sep. 1766)
Names
- Charles-Maurice Grimaldi; Charles-Maurice Goyon de Matignon; Monégasque: Carlu-Mauriçi de Mu̍negu
- House: Grimaldi (maternally, official); Goyon (agnatically)
- Father: Jacques I, Prince of Monaco
- Mother: Louise Hippolyte, Princess of Monaco

Charles-Maurice of Monaco (Monégasque: Carlu-Mauriçi de Mu̍negu; 14 May 1727 – 18 January 1798), sometimes referred to as Charles-Maurice Goyon de Matignon or Charles-Maurice Grimaldi, was a Monégasque prince, he was the third surviving child and youngest son of Prince Jacques I and Princess Louise Hippolyte.

== Early life and marriage ==
Charles-Maurice was born on May 14, 1727, to Jacques I and Louise Hippolyte of Monaco, his mother was the second female sovereign of Monaco.

=== Marriage ===
On December 10, 1749, in the chapel of the Hôtel Saint-Simon in Paris (with the approval of King Louis XV dated November 1, 1749), he married Marie-Christine de Rouvroy de Saint-Simon (1728–1774), daughter of Jacques-Louis de Rouvroy (1698–1746), Duke of Saint-Simon by gift inter vivos, known as the "Duke of Ruffec," and his wife Catherine-Charlotte-Thérèse de Gramont (1707–1755). Marie-Christine was the granddaughter of the renowned memoirist Louis de Rouvroy de Saint-Simon (1675–1755), Duke of Saint-Simon. As his wife was a Grandee of Spain of the first class, Charles-Maurice became a Grandee of Spain of the first class jure uxoris.

No children were born from this marriage, which ended in separation in 1766.

== Military career ==
Charles-Maurice of Monaco never took his vows in the Order of Saint John of Jerusalem, which he left following the deaths of two of his elder brothers.

Appointed guidon of the Gendarmerie in 1745, at the age of 18, he participated a few months later in the Battle of Fontenoy, during which he was wounded (May 11). Voltaire wrote a poem "likely to inflame hearts and send the handsome lords of the court to immortality" in which he evokes the wounding of the Count of Valentinois in these terms: "Monaco loses its blood, and love sighs for it." Promoted to ensign in the gendarmerie of Brittany on March 8, 1746, he became a sub-lieutenant in the same company in March 1747. On February 10, 1759, he was promoted to brigadier of cavalry, Lieutenant-General in the government of Normandy, and governor of Granville, Saint-Lô, Cherbourg, and the Chausey Islands.

Although he is presented in a 1777 work as a Knight of the Golden Fleece, Charles-Maurice de Monaco is not found in the available lists. Confusion with his status as a Grandee of Spain by right of marriage is possible.

== Sources ==
- Tourtchine, Jean-Fred (2002). Les Manuscrits du Cèdre : Dictionnaire historique et généalogique (in French). CEDRE. ISSN 0993-3964.
- Labande, Léon-Honoré (2002). Histoire de la Principauté de Monaco (in French) (2nd ed.). Monaco: Archives du palais.
