= Strategemata =

Book by Frontinus

Lucius Caecilius Metellus embarking elephants on Sicily (illustration from a 15th-century translation of the Strategemata)

Strategemata, or Stratagems, is a Latin work by the Roman author Frontinus (c. 40 – 103 AD). It is a collection of examples of military stratagems from Greek and Roman history, ostensibly for the use of generals. Frontinus is assumed to have written Strategemata towards the end of the first century AD, possibly in connection with a lost work on military theory.

== Writing ==
Frontinus is best known as a writer on water engineering, but he had a distinguished military career. In Stratagems he draws partly on his own experience as a general in Germany under Domitian. However, most of the (more than five hundred) examples which he gives are less recent, for example he mentions the Siege of Uxellodunum in 51 BC. Similarities to versions in other Roman authors like Valerius Maximus and Livy suggest that he drew mainly on literary sources.

The work consists of four books, of which three are undoubtedly by Frontinus. The authenticity of the fourth book has been challenged.

== Translations ==
- Jean de Rovroy translated the Strategemata into French for King Charles VII of France (r. 1422–1461).
- A French translation by Nicolas Volcyr de Serrouville appeared in print at Paris in 1535.
- In 1664, Nicolas Perrot d'Ablancourt published a new translation.(Stratagemata (in French). Paris: Louis Billaine. 1664.)

A Spanish translation by Diego Guillén de Ávila appeared in print in 1516.

In the 20th century, Charles E. Bennett translated the Strategemata into English. His version was published with De aquaeductu (translated as Aqueducts of Rome) in the Loeb Classical Library.

== Editions ==
- Iuli Frontini Strategematon (in Latin). Leipzig: B.G. Teubner. 1888.

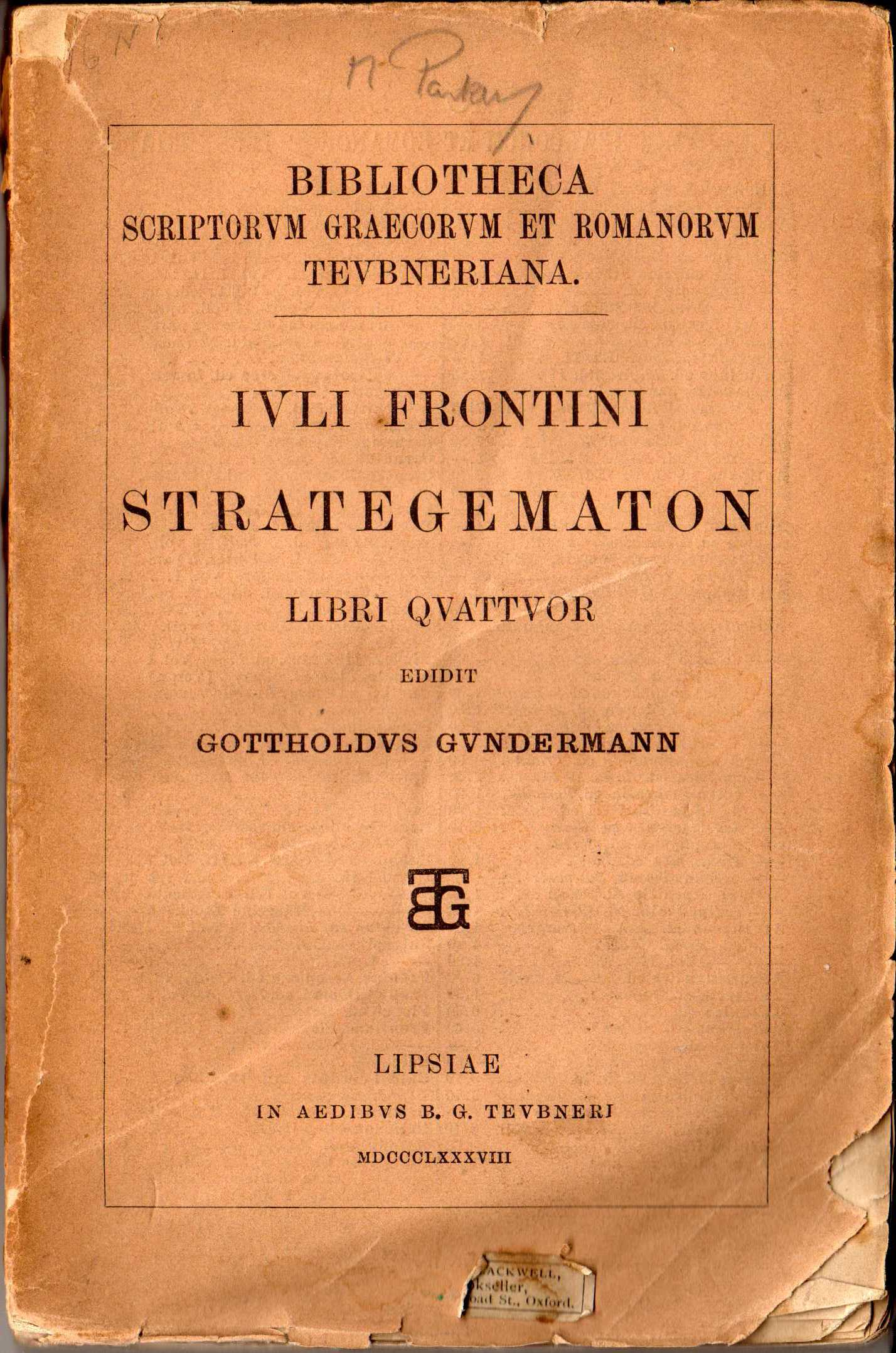
The 19th-century scholar Gotthold Gundermann edited the Latin text for the Bibliotheca Teubneriana series

== External sources ==
- Strategemata (in Latin)
- The Stratagems and The Aqueducts of Rome public domain audiobook at LibriVox
- Frontinus: The man and the works (LacusCurtius website): this source provides the Latin text and the English translation from the 1925 Loeb edition.
