= Agde Cathedral =

Roman Catholic church

Coordinates: 43°18′50″N 3°28′9″E

Agde Cathedral Cathédrale Saint-Étienne d'Agde
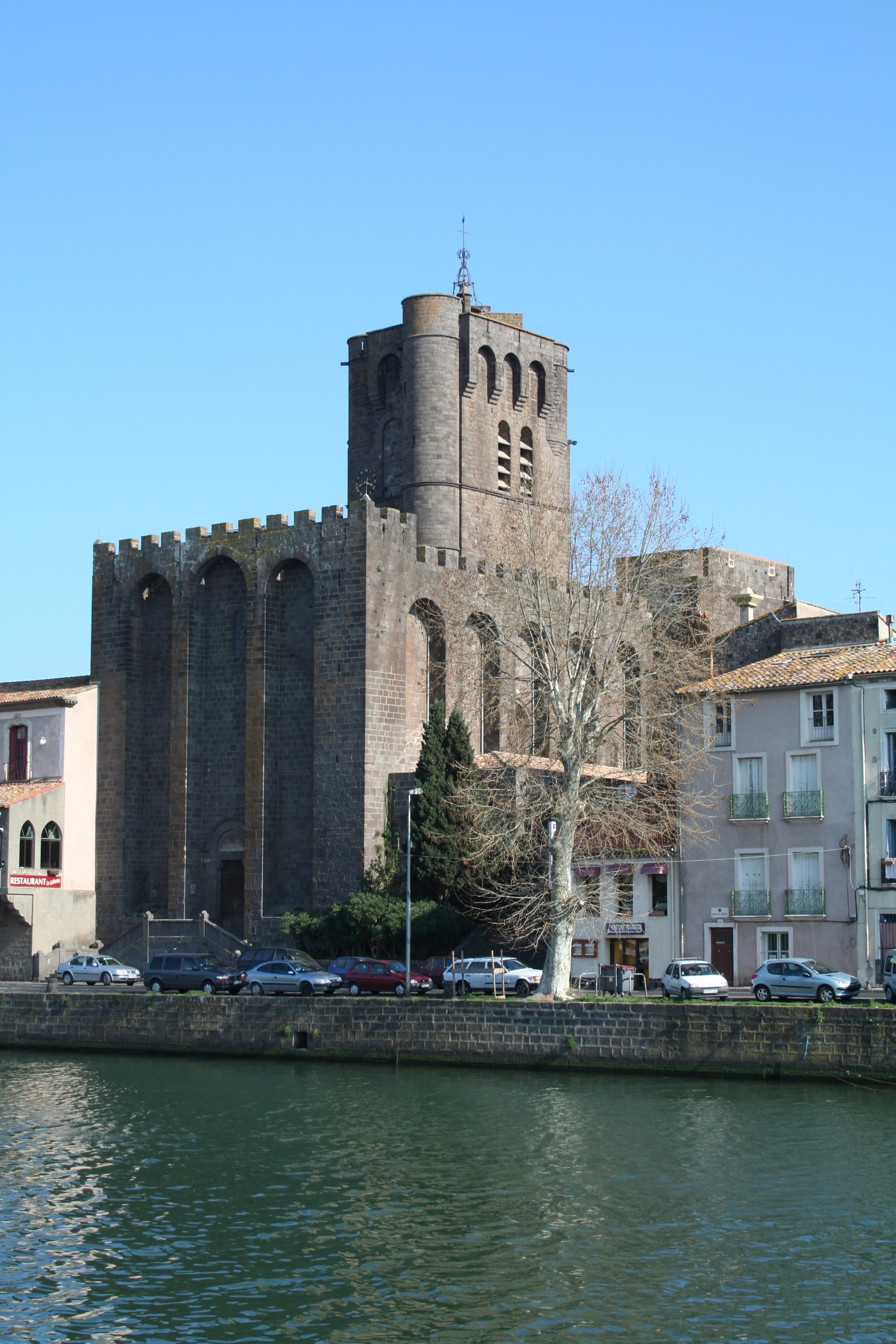
- Agde Cathedral

Religion
- Affiliation: Roman Catholic Church
- Province: Bishops of Agde
- Region: Hérault
- Rite: Roman
- Ecclesiastical or organisational status: Cathedral
- Status: Active

Location
- Location: Agde, France
- Interactive map of Agde Cathedral; Cathédrale Saint-Étienne d'Agde

Architecture
- Type: church
- Style: Romanesque, Baroque
- Groundbreaking: 12th century
- Completed: 19th century

Agde Cathedral (French: Cathédrale Saint-Étienne d'Agde) is a Roman Catholic church located in Agde in the Hérault département of southern France. The cathedral is dedicated to Saint Stephen, and stands on the bank of the river Hérault.

It was formerly the seat of the Bishops of Agde, the last of whom, Charles-François-Siméon de Rouvroy de Saint-Simon de Vermandois de Sandricourt, was guillotined during the Terror. The see was not restored after the French Revolution and its parishes were added to the Diocese of Montpellier by the Concordat of 1801.

== History and description ==
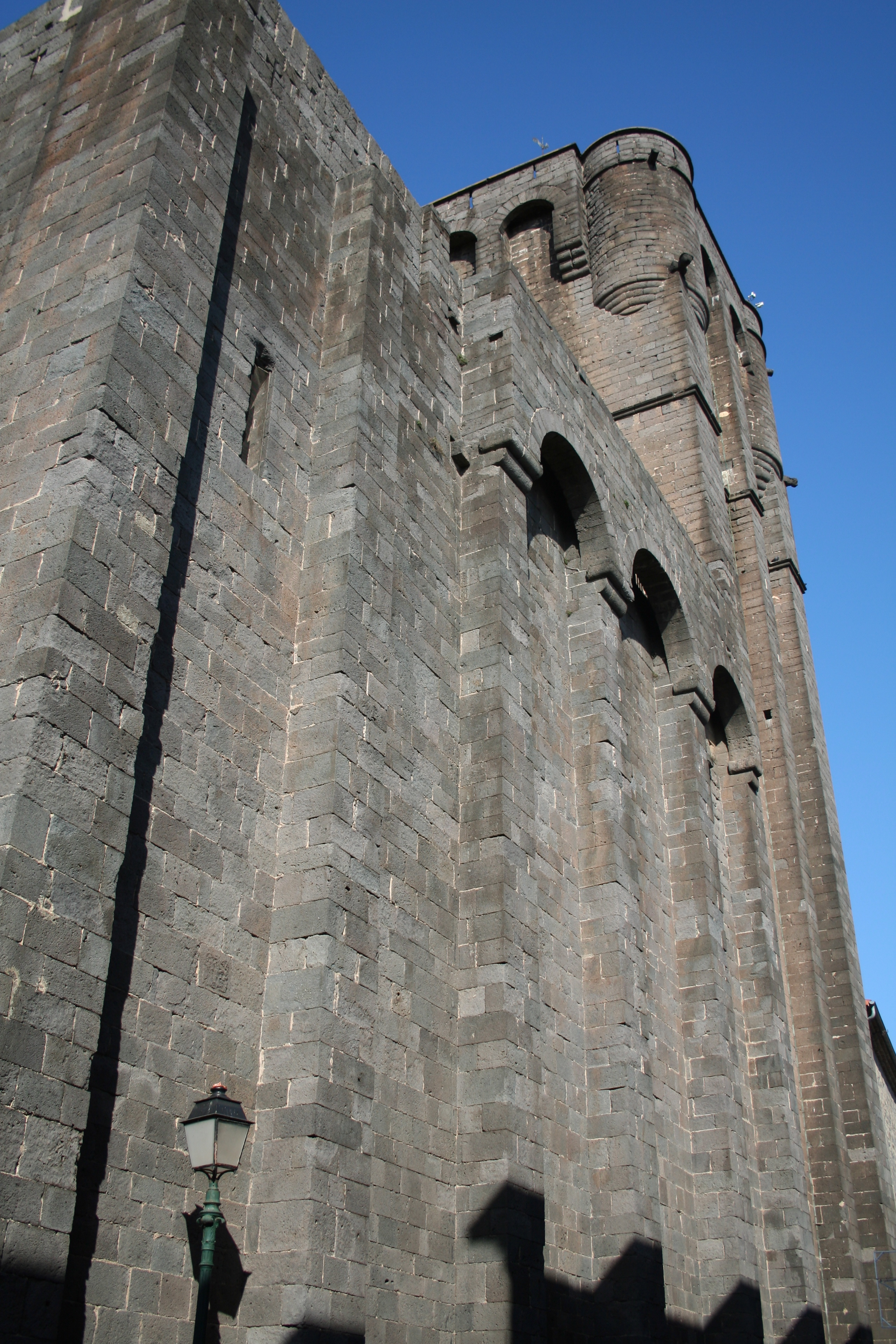
The cathedral walls

The present building was constructed in the 12th century, beginning in 1173 under the direction of bishop William II of Agde, replacing a 9th-century Carolingian church that had stood on the foundations of a 5th-century Roman church, which stood on the site of a temple of Diana.

The cathedral is remarkable for being built of black basalt from the nearby volcanic Mont St. Loup quarries. The building is extremely strong and was designed to serve as a fortress as much as a church: the walls are between 2 and 3 metres thick, and the square tower, 35 metres high, could also function as a keep (a fortified tower). The very prominent crenellations and machicolations are more characteristic of a fortress than of a church. It was declared a monument historique in 1840.

The Romanesque cloister which once adjoined the cathedral was demolished in 1857. Many of the materials, such as the capitals and the columns, were shortly afterwards reused for the construction of the lady chapel, which is now used as the entrance.

The 17th century high altar is made of polychromatic marble, which stands out against the austere setting of the cathedral's interior, as does the organ's Baroque architectural style.

Of the cathedral's five bells, four are hung in the belltower, and were cast by Burdin-Aîné of Lyon in 1894 and 1895. The fifth is on top of the belltower and is used only for the chiming of the clock. It was cast in 1665 by Damiac Fulcrand at Béziers, and declared a monument historique in 1959.

== Gallery ==
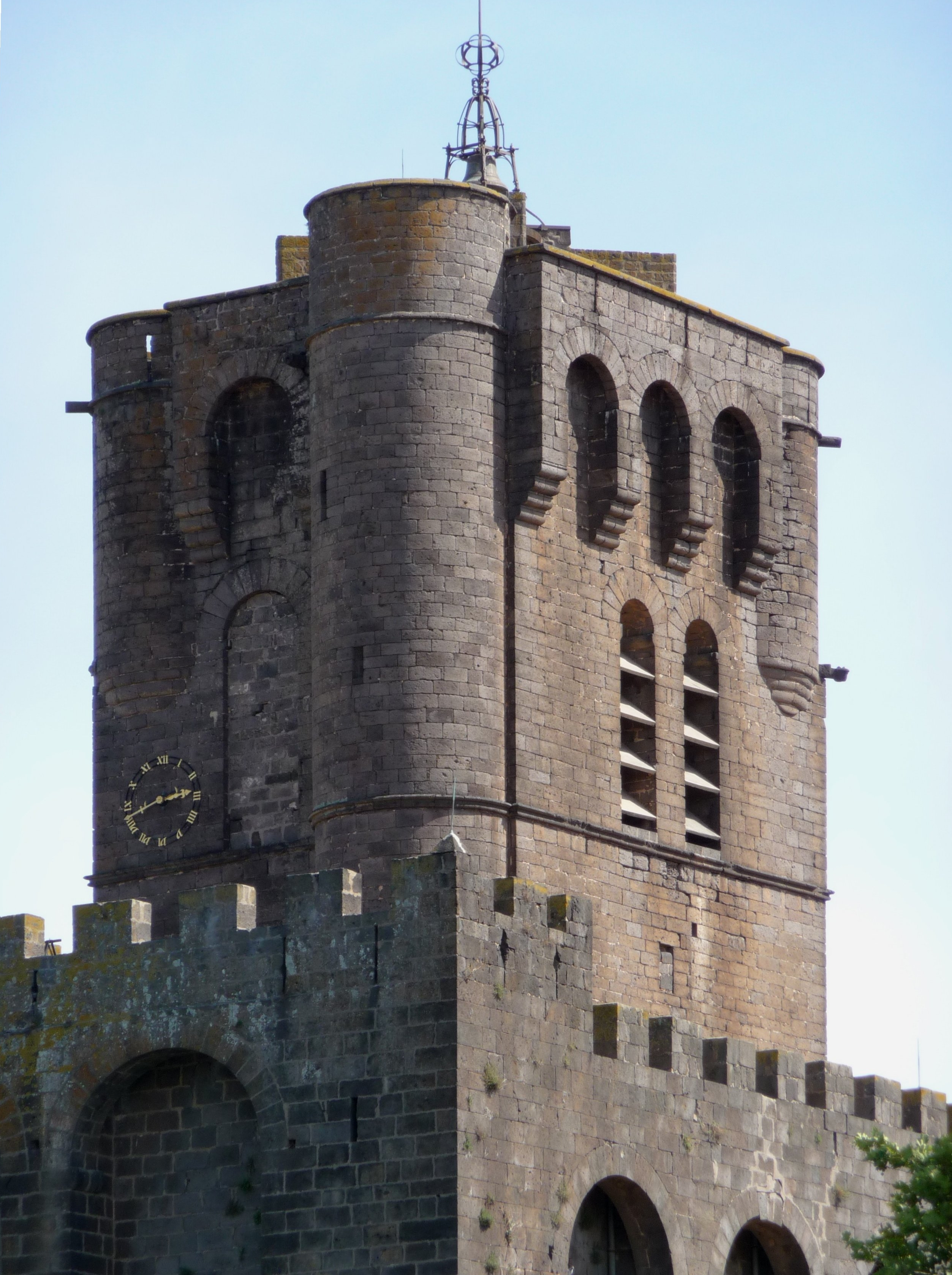
Donjon, on the cathedral tower

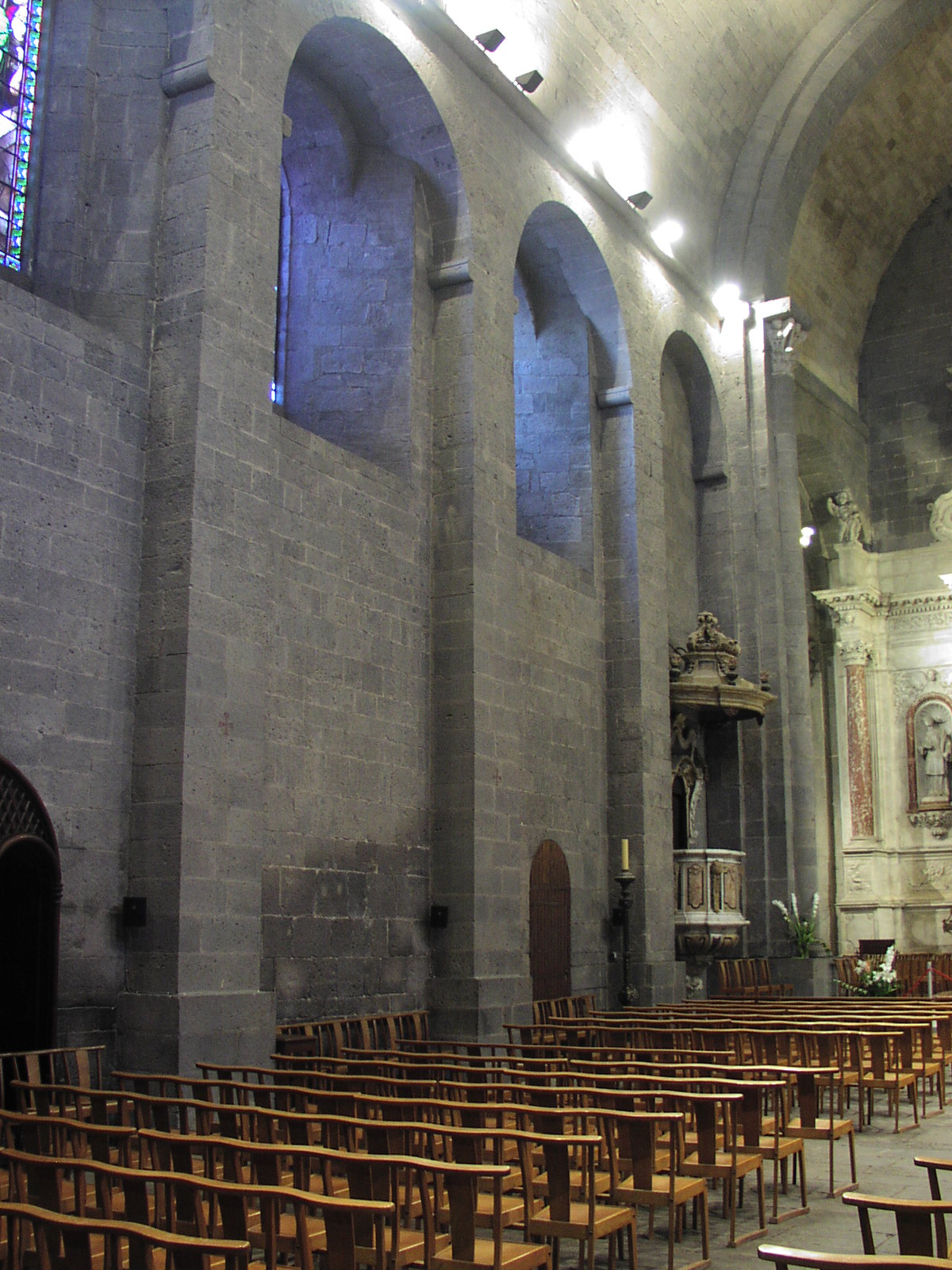
Interior

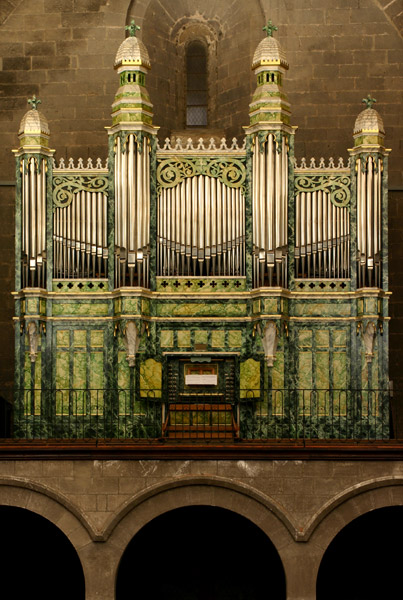
Organ (Gérald Guillemin, 1990)

== Sources and external links ==
- Agde Cathedral at Structurae
- Ministère de la culture: archive photographs (in French)
- Agde municipality (in French)
- Agde Tourist Office (in French)
- Amis des Orgues d'Agde (in French)
