= Claude de Rouvroy, duc de Saint-Simon =

French soldier and courtier

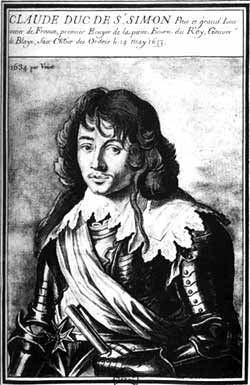
Claude de Rouvroy de Saint-Simon

Claude de Rouvroy, 1st Duke of Saint-Simon (French pronunciation: [klod də ʁuvʁwa]; August 1607 – 3 May 1693), was a French soldier and courtier, and favourite of Louis XIII, who created his dukedom for him. His only son Louis de Rouvroy, Duke of Saint-Simon (1675–1755) was the famous memoirist of the court of Louis XIV.

He was the second son of Louis de Rouvroy, Seigneur du Plessis (died 1643), who had been a warm supporter of Henri, Duke of Guise and the Catholic League.

== Life and career ==
With his elder brother Charles (who later became the marquis de Saint-Simon), Claude de Rouvroy entered the service of Louis XIII as a page and found instant favour with the king. Named first equerry in March 1627, he became in less than three years the captain of the châteaux of St-Germain and Versailles, Master of the hounds, first gentleman of the bed-chamber, royal councillor and governor of Meulan and of Blaye.

On the fall of La Rochelle in 1628, he received lands in the vicinity valued at 80,000 livres. In 1635, his seigneurie of Saint-Simon in Vermandois was erected into a duchy, and he was created a peer of France. Despite the estrangement of later years, he had a true regard for the king, and he brought his son up to revere him as the model of kingship.

He was at first on good terms with Richelieu and was of service on the Day of Dupes (11 November 1630). Having suffered disgrace for taking the part of his uncle, the baron of Saint Léger, after the capture of Catelet (15 August 1636), he retired to Blaye.

He fought in the campaigns of 1638 and 1639, and after the death of Richelieu returned to court, where he was coldly received by the king (18 February 1643). Thenceforth, with the exception of siding with Condé during the Fronde, he took small part in politics.

By his first wife, Diane de Budos de Portes, a relative of Condé, whom he married in 1644 and who died in 1670, he had three daughters. By his second wife, Charlotte de l'Aubespine, whom he married in 1672, he had a son Louis, the "author of the memoirs".
