= Charles François de Rouvroy =

French bishop

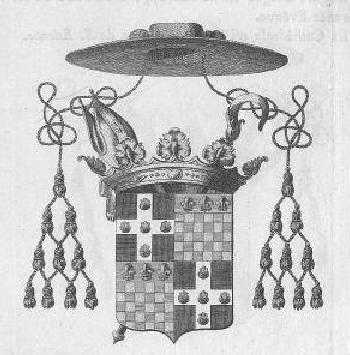
coat of arms

Charles François Siméon de Rouvroy, called Monseigneur de Saint-Simon (French pronunciation: [ʃaʁl fʁɑ̃swa simeɔ̃ də ʁuvʁwa]; 5 April 1727 - executed in Paris, 26 July 1794) was a French bishop. He was the last bishop of Agde.

== Family ==
He was the son of Louis de Rouvroy, marquis de Sandricourt (1679-1751) and was the uncle of Claude Henri de Rouvroy, comte de Saint-Simon. He belonged to a minor branch of the Dukes of Saint-Simon. He studied in the College of Harcourt and obtained a degree in theology.

== Career ==
After his ordination 1759 by his uncle mgr. Claude-Charles de Rouvroy (1695-1760), Bishop of Metz, he became member of the 'Académie royale des Inscriptions et Belles-Lettres. He was a fond collector of books and spent nights in his library, suffering from asthma.

During the French Revolution the bishop was arrested and executed by Guillotine.
