= Gotthold Gundermann =

German classical philologist

Gotthold Gundermann (11 March 1856 in Freienorla – 19 October 1921 in Tübingen) was a German classical philologist.

He studied classical philology at the University of Jena, receiving his doctorate in 1880. Afterwards, he worked as a schoolteacher in Jena and served as an educator in Stuttgart. He took a study trip to Italy and England, and for several years worked as a collaborator on the multi-volume Corpus glossarium latinorum. He obtained his habilitation at Jena, and in 1891 became an associate professor. Later on, he held professorships at the universities of Giessen (from 1893) and Tübingen (from 1902).

== Selected works ==
- De Juli Frontini strategematon libris (Bibliotheca Teubneriana edition of a collection of stratagems by Frontinus, 1888).
- Glossae latinograecae et graecolatinae (with Georg Goetz, 1888).
- Die zahlzeichen, 1899 – The number characters.
- Hippocratis De aere aqvis locis (edition of Hippocrates, 1911)
- Trogus und Gellius bei Radulfus de Diceto (edited by Georg Goetz, 1926) – Gnaeus Pompeius Trogus and Aulus Gellius by Ralph de Diceto.
