= Louis de Rouvroy, duc de Saint-Simon =

French courtier and memoirist (1675–1755)

Louis de Rouvroy
- Duke of Saint-Simon
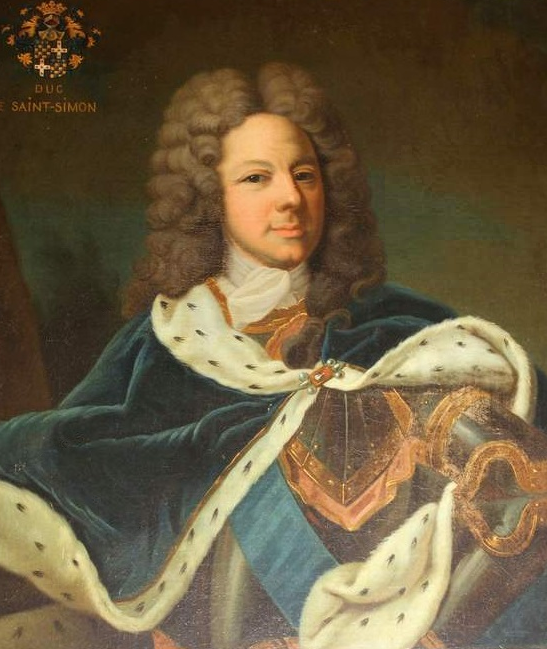
- Portrait by Jean-Baptiste van Loo, c. 1728
- Born: 16 January 1675; Paris, France
- Died: 2 March 1755 (aged 80); Paris, France
- Spouse: Marie Gabrielle de Durfort
- Issue Detail: Charlotte, Princess of Chimay; Jacques Louis, Marquis of Ruffec; Armand Jean
- Father: Claude de Rouvroy
- Mother: Charlotte de L'Aubespine

Louis de Rouvroy, duc de Saint-Simon, GE (French: [lwi də ʁuvʁwa]; 16 January 1675 – 2 March 1755), was a French courtier and memoirist, who also spent time as a soldier and diplomat. He was born in Paris at the Hôtel Selvois, 6 rue Taranne (demolished in 1876 to make way for the Boulevard Saint-Germain). The family's ducal peerage (duché-pairie), granted in 1635 to his father Claude de Rouvroy (1608–1693), served as both perspective and theme in Saint-Simon's life and writings. He was the second and last Duke of Saint-Simon.

His extensive memoirs are canonical texts of French literature that give full and lively accounts of the court at Versailles of Louis XIV and the Régence at the start of Louis XV's reign. His relationship with Louis XIV was strained, but he was a life-long friend of Louis' nephew Philippe II, Duke of Orléans, who was made Regent for the infant Louis XV after the death of the late king. Orleans appointed Saint-Simon to his council and in 1721 made him ambassador to Spain.

== Peerage of France ==
Crown and mantle of the dukes and peers of France.

Men of the noblest blood (in Saint-Simon's view) might not be, and in most cases were not, peers in France. Derived at least traditionally and imaginatively from the douze pairs (twelve peers) of Charlemagne, the peerage of France was supposed to be, literally, the chosen of the noblesse, deemed thereafter to incarnate the French nobility par excellence. Their legal pre-eminence derived from hereditary membership in the Parlement of Paris, the highest of France's judicial and quasi-legislative assemblies. Strictly speaking, a French peerage (usually attached to a dukedom) was granted in favour of a designated fief rather than upon the titleholder per se. His lifelong ambition was the conversion of France's peers into a Great Council of the Nation.

The family's principal seat, where Saint-Simon's Mémoires was written, was at La Ferté-Vidame, bought by his father shortly after his elevation to the dukedom. The castle brought with it the ancient, entailed title, Vidame de Chartres, borne as a courtesy style by the Duke's only son until he was eighteen. As it had been attributed to an elderly character in the well-known court novel La Princesse de Clèves, published in 1678, just three years after Saint-Simon's birth, his arrival at court as a young man may have been less inconspicuous than otherwise.

== Life ==
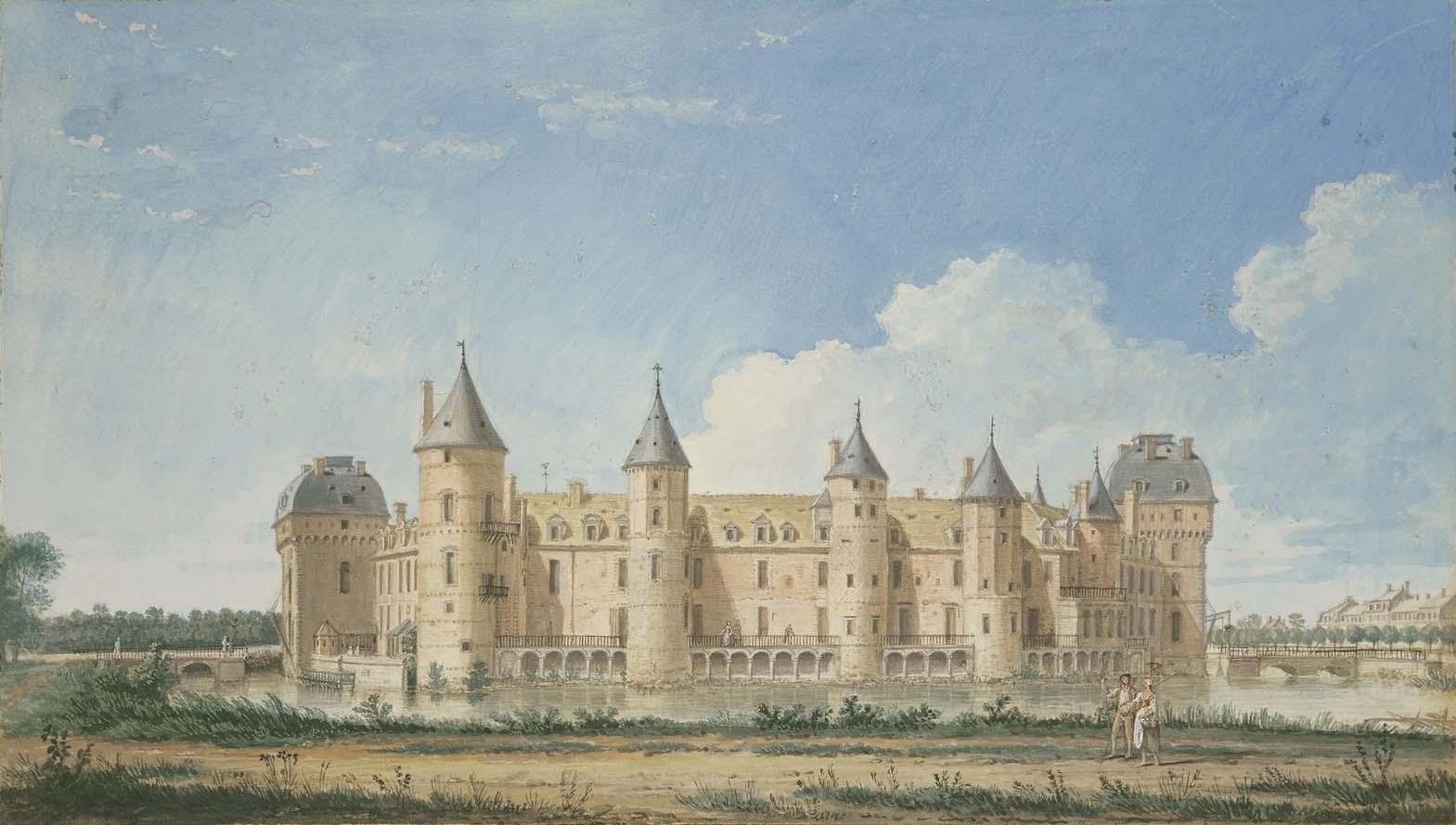
La Ferté-Vidame Castle, south facade, circa 1750, by Louis-Nicolas Van Blarenberghe, Museum of Fine Arts, Boston.

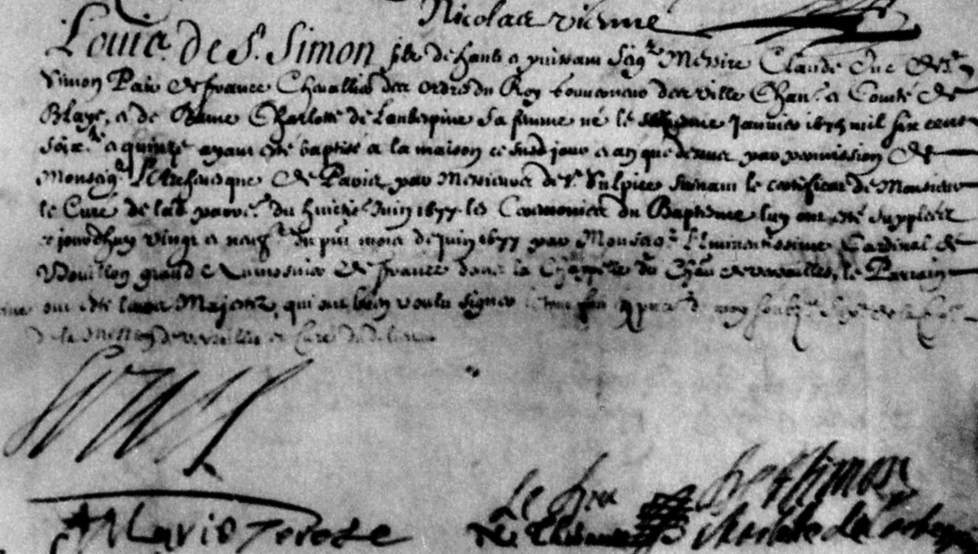
Saint-Simon's baptismal certificate, signed by the king and queen, bottom left. Versailles Castle Archives.

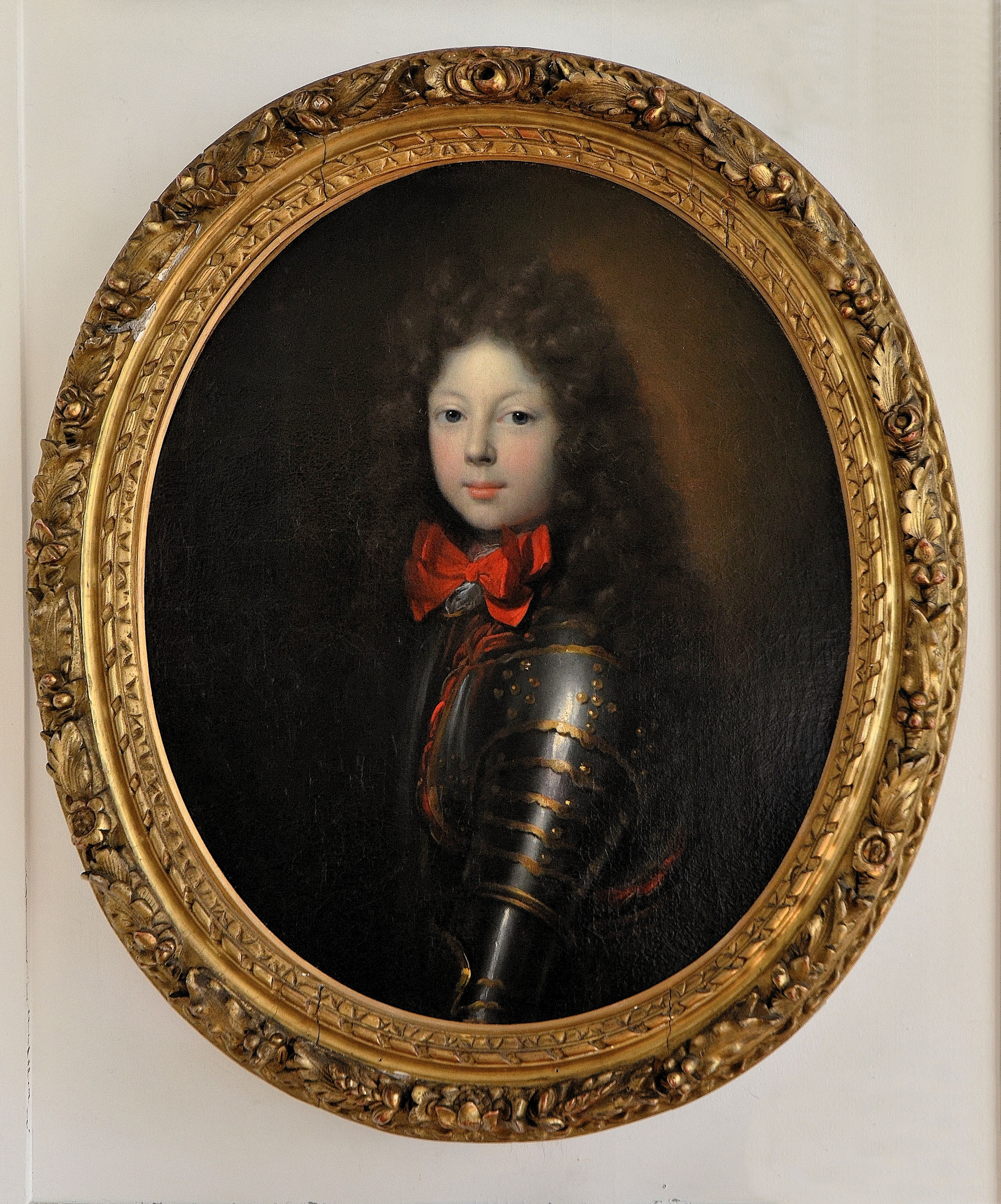
Portrait of a young Saint-Simon, by Hyacinthe Rigaud, c. 1685

His father, Claude, the first duke, was a tall and taciturn man who was keen on hunting. Louis de Saint-Simon was the opposite; garrulous, much shorter, and preferring life indoors. His father had been a favourite hunting companion of Louis XIII. King Louis had appointed his father as Master of Wolfhounds before granting him a dukedom in 1635 at a relatively young age; he was 68 when Louis was born. Saint-Simon ranked thirteenth in the order of precedence among France's eighteen dukes. His mother, Charlotte de L'Aubespine, daughter of François, Marquis de Hauterive by his wife, Eléonore de Volvire, marquise de Ruffec, descended from a distinguished family, noble since at least the time of Francis I.

She was a formidable woman whose word was law in the family, and became more so in extreme old age. Her son Louis, of whom Louis XIV and Queen Marie-Thérèse were godparents, was well-educated, largely by her. After further tuition from the Jesuits, he joined the Mousquetaires gris in 1692, serving at the Siege of Namur and at the Battle of Neerwinden. Then he embarked upon his life's mission by pronouncing upon the precedence among French peers, much against the orders and interests of François-Henri de Montmorency, duc de Luxembourg, his victorious general.

In 1695, he married Marie-Gabrielle de Durfort, daughter of Guy Aldonce Durfort, Duke of Lorges, a marshal of France, later serving under the Duke's command. He seems to have regarded her with a respect and affection unusual between husband and wife in that era; and she sometimes succeeded in suppressing his pompous ideals. As he did not receive further promotion in the army, he resigned his commission in 1702, thereby incurring Louis XIV's displeasure. He kept his position at court but only with difficulty, and then immersed himself in court intrigue at Versailles, tapping a collection of informants, the likes of dukes as well as servants, which later yielded him the benefit of an extraordinary amount of privileged information.

Saint-Simon, for his own part, appears to have played only an intermediate role in court life. He was nominated as ambassador to Rome in 1705, but the appointment was cancelled before he departed. At last, he attached himself to Philippe II, Duke of Orléans, Louis XIV's nephew and the future regent. Though this was hardly likely to ingratiate him with Louis, it at least gave him the status of belonging to a definite party and it eventually placed him in the position of a friend to the acting chief of state. He also allied himself with Louis, Duke of Burgundy, the Dauphin's son and next heir to the French throne.

Saint-Simon loathed "the bastards", Louis XIV's illegitimate children, and not, apparently, entirely because they were accorded ceremonial precedence above France's peers. The Saint-Simon that is revealed through the Mémoires had many enemies, and a hatred reciprocated by many courtiers. However, it should be remembered that these reminiscences were written 30 years after the facts, by a disappointed man, and that Saint-Simon had maintained congenial or at least courteous relations with the majority of his fellow courtiers.

The death of Louis XIV seemed to have given Saint-Simon a chance of realizing his hopes. The Duke of Orleans became regent and Saint-Simon was appointed to his Regency Council. But no steps were taken to carry out his "preferred vision" of a France ruled by the noble élite, exposing how little real influence he had with the Regent. He was somewhat gratified by the degradation of "the bastards" in 1718 and, in 1721, he was appointed ambassador extraordinary to Spain so as to facilitate the marriage of Louis XV and Infanta Mariana Victoria of Spain (which, however, never took place). Whilst in Spain he did, however, secure a grandeeship, which later devolved upon his second son. Despite having caught smallpox, he was quite satisfied with his efforts there: two ducal titles (grandees were recognised in France as dukes). Saint-Simon was not eager, unlike most other nobility, to acquire profitable functions, and he did not use his influence to repair his finances, which were even further diminished by the extravagance of his embassy.

After his return to France, he had little to do with public affairs. His own account of the cessation of his intimacy with Orléans and Guillaume Dubois, the latter having never been his friend, is, like his account of some other events of his own life, rather vague and dubious. But there can be little doubt that he was eclipsed, and even expelled from the Château de Meudon by Cardinal Dubois. He survived for more than thirty years, but little is known of the rest of his life. His wife died in 1743, his eldest son a little later. He had other family troubles, and he was loaded with debt. The dukedom in which he took such pride ended with him, and his only granddaughter was childless.

He died in Paris on 2 March 1755, having almost entirely outlived his own generation and exhausted his family's wealth, though not its notoriety. A distant relative, Claude Henri de Rouvroy, comte de Saint-Simon, born five years after the Duke's death, is remembered as an intellectual forerunner of socialism.

All his possessions, including his writings, were seized by the Crown on his death. His Mémoires were kept under sequestration and only circulated through private copies and excerpts until the restitution of the manuscript to his heirs in 1828. While its appendices and supporting documents were dispersed, this sequestration was ultimately credited for the preservation of his memoirs.

== Fame as a writer ==
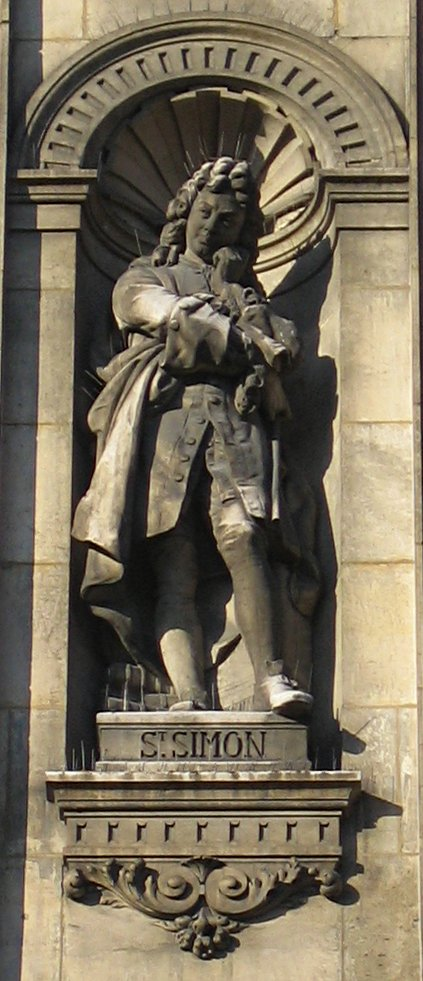
Statue of Saint-Simon, Hôtel de Ville, Paris

Posthumously, he acquired great literary fame. He was an indefatigable writer, and he began very early to record all the gossip he collected, all his interminable legal disputes over precedence, and a vast mass of unclassified material. Most of his manuscripts were retrieved by the Crown and it was long before their contents were fully published: partly in the form of notes in the marquis de Dangeau's Journal, partly in both original and independent memoirs, partly in scattered and multifarious extracts; he had committed to paper an immense amount of material.

Saint-Simon believed he could improve upon Dangeau's dry chronicling of events with his own vivid narrative style. According to Charles Henry Conrad Wright, "taking Dangeau as foundation, he goes over the same ground, sometimes copying, more often developing or inserting additional information, the result of more acute observation."

Saint-Simon's Mémoires strike a most realistic note. On the one hand, he is petty, and unjust to private enemies and to those who espoused public views contrary to his as well as being an incessant gossip. Yet he shows a great skill for narrative and for character-drawing. He has been compared to the historians Livy and Tacitus. He is not a writer who can be sampled easily, inasmuch as his most characteristic passages sometimes occur in the midst of long stretches of quite uninteresting diatribe. His vocabulary was extreme and inventive. He is deemed to have first used the word "intellectual" as a noun. "Patriot" and "publicity" are also accredited as being introduced by him in their current usage.

Questions concerning the historical accuracy of his portraits remains a topic of interest for historians and critics, including Charles Augustin Sainte-Beuve. While it has been indicated that Saint-Simon's accounts are often dominated by his personal prejudice, such as in his famous account of the death of the Dauphin, or of the Bed of Justice in which his personal enemy, Louis-Auguste de Bourbon, duc du Maine, was degraded, his writing is celebrated for immortalizing vibrant portraits of the French nobility. His narrative style and methods of characterization profoundly impacted many French writers, notably Proust who published a pastiche of Saint-Simon in 1908.

The bishops are "cuistres violets" (purple pedants). "(M. de Caumartin) porte sous son manteau toute la faculté que M. de Villeroy étale sur son baudrier" (Caumartin holds under his cloak all the power that Villeroy displays on his scabbard). Another politician has a "mine de chat fâché" (appearance of a disgruntled cat). In short, the interest of his Mémoires is in the novel and adroit use of words and phrases.

In A Short History of French Literature, the Mémoires are described as "vast and rambling...one of the least-read masterpieces of the age" which "provide us not only with a picture of the squalor and pettiness which often lay behind the glittering façade of the court, but also with the precise angle of perception of a senior courtier. This is prose narrative on a monumental scale; how much of it is fiction is hard to tell, but in this area the distinction is not paramount, since what matters is the imaginative reconstruction of a lost world (Proust owes not a little to Saint-Simon)".

== Family ==
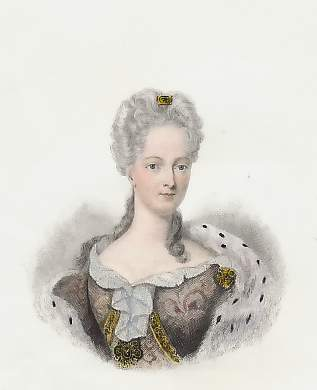
Marie-Gabrielle de Durfort.

Saint-Simon married Marie-Gabrielle de Durfort (daughter of Guy Aldonce de Durfort, duc de Lorges), on 8 April 1695, at the Hôtel de Lorges in Paris.

They had three children:

1. Charlotte de Rouvroy (8 September 1696 – 29 September 1763) married Charles-Louis de Henin-Liétard d'Alsace, "Prince of Chimay"; they had no children. He was the brother of Cardinal d'Alsace.
2. Jacques Louis de Rouvroy, Duke of Ruffec (29 July 1698 – 15 July 1746) married, in 1727, Cathérine Charlotte Thérèse de Gramont (died 1755), daughter of the Duke of Gramont (widow of Philippe Alexandre, Duke of Bournonville), leaving no children;
3. Armand-Jean de Rouvroy (12 April 1699 – 20 May 1754) married Marie Jeanne Louise, daughter of Nicolas Prosper Bauyn d'Angervilliers; they had one daughter.

His granddaughter Marie Christine de Rouvroy, Mademoiselle de Ruffec (daughter of Jacques Louis) married a son of the Princess Louise Hippolyte of Monaco, Charles-Maurice, in 1749, becoming the "Countess of Valentinois".

== Bibliography ==
=== Memoirs ===
Extensive publication of Saint-Simon's Mémoires did not proceed until the 1820s. The first and greatest critical edition was produced in the Grands écrivains de la France series. The most accessible modern editions consist of huge nine volumes in the Bibliothèque de la Pléiade and the eleven volumes in Carrefour du Net edition, prefaced by Didier Hallépée.

1. 1829-1830 edition under the Restoration
2. 1856 Edition by Adolphe Chéruel at Hachette
3. 1879 Edition by Arthur de Boislisle
4. Jean-Claude Lattès Edition (20 volumes)
5. The first Pleiade edition edited by Gonzague Truc (1947-1961) published by Gallimard
6. The second Pleiade edition edited and annotated with an Introduction by Yves Coirault (1983–88, 1993) published by Gallimard (8 volumes) - contains variants and Additions to the Journal of Dangeau. The volumes are:
  1. 1691-1701
  2. 1701-7
  3. 1707-10
  4. 1711-14
  5. 1714-16
  6. 1716-18
  7. 1718-21
  8. 1721-23
  9. Memoir on the interest of princes of the blood in preventing any enlargement of the legitimised children of kings (pages 621-752 in Political Treatises and Other Writings) (1993)
  10. Materials for use in a memoir on the present occurrence (August 1753) (pages 438-439 in Memoirs (excerpts) and various works) (1993)

=== Other writings ===
1. Unpublished Papers of the Duke of Saint-Simon: Letters and Dispatches on the Spanish Embassy (1880) - published Paris, A. Quantin with a preface by Édouard Drumont
2. Political Treaties and Other Writings - Pleiade edition edited and annotated with an Introduction by Yves Coirault (1983–88, 1993) published by Gallimard
  1. Drafts of projects
  2. Marriage of the son of the Prince of Rohan
  3. Project for the Restoration of the Kingdom of France
  4. The Collection of the late Lord Dauphin
  5. Views on the future of France
  6. Brief memoir on the formalities
  7. Memoir on the interest of princes of the blood in preventing any enlargement of the legitimized children of kings
  8. Preamble to the Houses of Albret, Armagnac and Châtillon
  9. On the social elites of the kingdom
  10. Light Notions of Commanders, Knights and Grand Officers of the Order of the Holy Spirit
  11. Great Charges
  12. Materials on the qualities assumed by M. de Soubise of prince and serene highness
  13. Parallel of the first three Bourbon kings
3. Centuries and Days. Letters (1693-1754) and Note "Saint-Simon" from the Duchies-peerages, etc., (2000) (ISBN 978-2-7453-0251-9), texts collected and commented by Yves Coirault, preface by Emmanuel Le Roy Ladurie, published Paris, Editions Honoré Champion
  1. Letters of Saint-Simon and Appendices I and II
  2. Anonymous letter to the King (April 1712)
  3. Note on the House of Saint-Simon
  4. Notes on all the duchies-peerages (Extracts)
  5. The Funeral of the Dauphine-Bavaria
  6. Father Anselme's Continuation Project
  7. Farewell to the Century
4. Hierarchy and mutations: Writings on the social kaleidoscope - texts compiled and commented by Yves Coirault, published by Paris, Éditions Honoré Champion , 2002, 424 p. (ISBN 978-2-7453-0545-9)

=== Abridged and partial English-language translations of the Mémoires ===
There are a number of English-language translations of Selections of the Mémoires:

- Memoirs on the Reign of Louis XIV, and the Regency. Abridged by Bayle St. John. London: Chapman, 1857.
- The Memoirs of the Duke of Saint-Simon on the reign of Louis XIV, and the Regency. 2nd edition. 3 volumes. Translated by Bayle St. John. London: Swan, Sonnenschein, Lowrey, 1888.
- Memoirs of the Duc de Saint-Simon on the Times of Louis XIV, and the Regency. Translated and abridged by Katharine Prescott Wormeley. Boston: Hardy, Pratt, 1902.
- Louis XIV at Versailles: A Selection from the Memoirs of the Duc de Saint-Simon. Translated and edited by Desmond Flower. London: Cassell, 1954.
- The Age of Magnificence: The Memoirs of the Duke de Saint-Simon. Edited and translated by Sanche de Gramont aka Ted Morgan. New York: Putnam, 1963.
- Memoirs of the Duc de Saint-Simon. Edited by W.H. Lewis. Translated by Bayle St. John. London: B.T. Batsford, 1964.
- Historical Memoirs of the Duc de Saint-Simon, volume 1 1691-1709. Edited and translated by Lucy Norton. London: Hamish Hamilton, 1967.
- Historical Memoirs of the Duc de Saint-Simon, volume 2 1710-1715. Edited and translated by Lucy Norton. London: Hamish Hamilton, 1968.
- Historical Memoirs of the Duc de Saint-Simon, volume 3 1715-1723. Edited and translated by Lucy Norton. London: Hamish Hamilton, 1972.
- Saint-Simon at Versailles. Edited and translated by Lucy Norton. London: Hamish Hamilton, 1980. Includes selections omitted from the three longer volumes, which together include about 40% of the whole work.

=== Studies of the Mémoirs in English ===
- Auerbach, Erich. Mimesis. Princeton: Princeton University Press, 1953. (Chapter 16, "The Interrupted Supper")
- Cioran, Emil Michel. "Drawn and Quartered". New York: Arcade Publishing, 1998. (Section II)
- Le Roy Ladurie, Emmanuel. Saint-Simon and the Court of Louis XIV. Chicago: University of Chicago Press, 2001. ISBN 0-226-47320-1
- De Ley, Herbert. Saint-Simon Memorialist. Urbana: University of Illinois Press, 1975.
- Ruas, Charles. The Intellectual Development of the Duc de Saint Simon. Princeton University, 1970.
