= Ancient Diocese of Agde =

Roman Catholic diocese in France (5th c. - 1801)

Coordinates: 43.31°N 3.47°E

Ancient Diocese of Agde Dioecesis Agathensis

Information
- Sui iuris church: Latin Church
- Rite: Roman Rite
- Established: 6th century
- Dissolved: 1791 (1801)
- Archdiocese: Narbonne

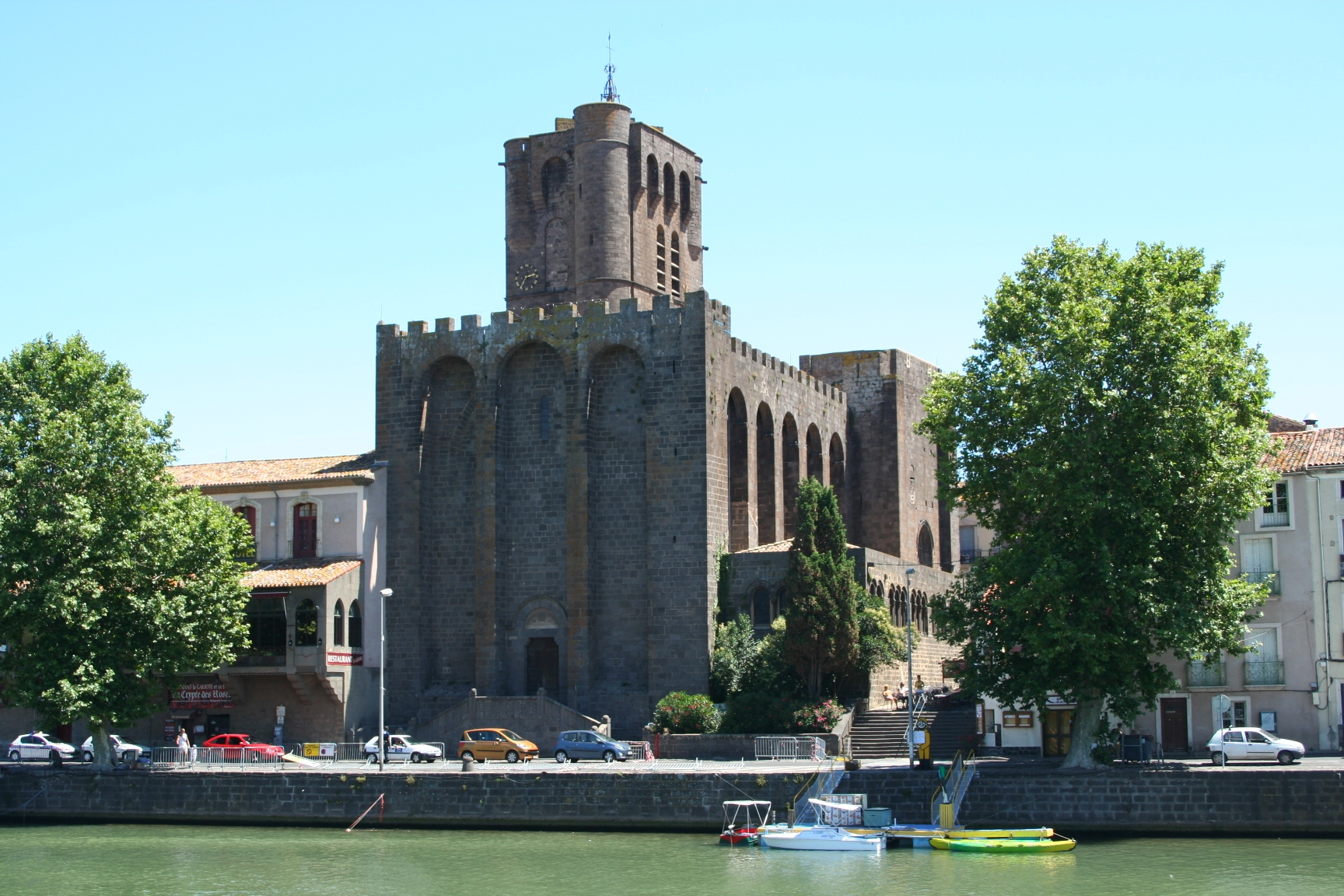
Cathédrale Saint-Étienne, Agde.

The former French Roman Catholic diocese of Agde (Lat.: Agathensis) was in existence by the beginning of the 6th century. It was a suffragan of the diocese of Narbonne. Agde was in Languedoc, in the south of France, in what is now the department of Hérault. It was bounded on the east by the diocese of Montpellier, and on the north and west by the diocese of Béziers. The sea formed its southern boundary, and it was one of the principal ports of the Septimania.

The diocese of Agde was suppressed in 1791 during the French Revolution, and, in the Concordat of 1801 between First Consul Napoleon Bonaparte and Pope Pius VII, the diocese was not revived.

The seat of the bishop was the Cathedral of Saint-Étienne, originally dedicated to Saint Andrew. The diocese had only twenty-six parishes. The territory of the former diocese is now part of the diocese of Montpellier.

== History ==
The city of Agde came under the control of the Visigoths in 475, thanks to a treaty between King Euric and the Emperor Julius Nepos. It was occupied by the Saracens from c. 725 to 737. In the early feudal period it received a viscount attached to the Marquisate of Gothia. In 859 and 860, Agde was occupied by the Northmen. In the 10th century, the marquisate was joined to the Vicomté of Béziers. In 1187, Vicomte Bernard Aton ceded all of his seignorial rights to the bishop and Chapter of Agde. The bishops became vicomtes, and later comtes. This gave them a great advantage in excluding the Albigensian heresy from the city and diocese.

=== Chapter and cathedral ===
The Cathedral of Saint-Étienne, originally dedicated to Saint Andrew was located in the city of Agde. The cathedral was served by a Chapter, consisting of twelve Canons, including the Archdeacon, the Sacristan, the Precentor and the Treasurer. There were twelve chaplains (hebdomidarii), eight for daily services and four for requiems. There were thirty-two prebendaries.

There were two abbeys in the city, Saint-André, allegedly founded in the second half of the 5th century by the Syrian monk Severus; and Saint-Sever, originally called Saint-Martin, first heard of in the 9th century. In 1158, Saint-Sever, which had had several bishops as abbot, was united to the property (mensa) of the bishops of Agde. Outside the city, there was the abbey of Saint-Thibéry in the village called Cessero (Caesarion), six miles from Agde, first mentioned at the beginning of the 9th century. The abbey of Sainte-Marie de Valmagne was founded in 1138; its last monks dispersed in 1790, and in 1793 its physical remains were carted off and sold as building materials.

In April 1243, the archbishop of Narbonne held a diocesan synod at Béziers, addressing the problem of the resurgence of the Cathars (Albigensians). Bishop Pierre Raimond de Fabre of Agde (1243–1271) was present, and he also attended the council of 19 April 1246, in which the procedures for acting against heretics were decided upon. He won the favor of Pope Innocent IV who granted him the privilege of immunity from excommunication or interdict, except one pronounced by the pope himself.

On 5 December 1248, at the direction of Pope Innocent IV, the papal legates Cardinal Pietro de Collemedio and Hugo de Santo Caro held a special council at Valence of four ecclesiastical provinces, Narbonne, Vienne, Arles and Aix. The purpose was to excommunicate once again the Emperor Frederick II and his followers. The council also issued a set of 23 canons, mostly reenactments of earlier legislation. Among those present was the Bishop of Agde, Pierre Raymond de Fabri.

In 1562, at the beginning of the First French War of Religion (1562–1563), the Protestants captured Agde, from which they expelled the priests and members of religious orders. In 1563, they were driven out, and Catholic control was resumed. Protestant churches, however, were established in the diocese at Cette, Montagne, and Ville veyrae.

=== French Revolution ===
At the beginning of the French Revolution, the National Constituent Assembly ordered the replacement of political subdivisions of the ancien régime with subdivisions called "departments", to be characterized by a single administrative city in the center of a compact area. The decree was passed on 22 December 1789, and the boundaries fixed on 26 February 1790, with the effective date of 4 March 1790. A new department was created, called "Hérault", and its meeting center rotated among Montpellier, Béziers, Lodève, and Saint-Pons.

The National Constituent Assembly then, on 6 February 1790, instructed its ecclesiastical committee to prepare a plan for the reorganization of the clergy. At the end of May, its work was presented as a draft Civil Constitution of the Clergy, which, after vigorous debate, was approved on 12 July 1790. There was to be one diocese in each department, a policy later adhered to by Napoleon. Under the Civil Constitution of the Clergy, the seat of the Constitutional diocese of Hérault was fixed at Béziers, and Catholic diocese of Béziers and the other dioceses in Hérault, including the diocese of Agde, were consequently suppressed, their territories becoming part of the new diocese of Hérault.

The last bishop of Agde, Charles François de Rouvroy, was guillotined in Paris on July 25, 1794.

== Bishops ==
=== To 1000 ===
- [ (ca. 405) : Venustus]
- ( ca. 450?) : Beticus
- Sophronius 506
- (c. 541) : Leo
- (ca. 567–ca. 579) : Phronimius
- (589) : Tigridius
- (653) : Georgius
- (c. 673) : Wilesinde
- (683) : Primus
- (788, 791) : Justus
- (848–872) : Dagobert
- (885–897) : Boso
- (899–922) : Gerardus
- (922–c. 936) : Stephanus
- (937–948) : Dagobert
- ([ 949 : Bernard ])
- [ (954–957) : Salomon I. ]
- [ (958) : Bernhard II. ]
- [ (971) : Ameil ]
- (c. 955–976) : Salomon
- (982) : Armand (Arnaud)
- (990–1034) :Stephan (II.)

=== 1000 to 1300 ===
- (1043) : Guillaume
- (1050–1064) : Gontier (Gunther)
- (1068–1098) : Bérenger
- (1098–1122) : Bernard Déodat
- (1123–1129) : Adelbert
- (1130–1142) : Raimond de Montredon
- (1142–1149) : Ermengaud
- (1150–1152) : Bérenger
- (1152–1153) : Pons de Montmirat
- (1153–1162) : Adhémar
- (1165–1173) : Guillaume.
- (1173–1192) : Pierre Raimond
- (1192–1213) : Raimond de Montpellier
- (1214–1215?) : Pierre Pulverel
- (1215–1232) : Theodisius
- (1233–1241) : Bertrand de Saint-Just
- (1241–1242) : Chrétien
- (1243–1271) : Pierre Raimond de Fabre
- (1271–1296) : Pierre Bérenger de Montbrun
- (1296–1331) : Raimond du Puy

=== 1300 to 1500 ===
- (1332–1337) : Bernard Géraud (de Girard)
- [ (1337) : Pierre Raymond de Montbrun ]
- (1337–1342) : Guillaume Hunaud de Lanta
- (1342–1354) : Pierre de Bérail de Cessac
- (1354) : Arnaud Aubert
- (1354–1371) : Sicard D'Ambres de Lautrec
- (1371–1408) : Hugues de Montruc
- (1409–1411) : Cardinal Guy de MalesecAdministrator
- (1411–1425) : Philippe de Levis de Florensac
- (1425–1426) : Bérenger Guilhot, Administrator
- 1426–1436) : Jean Teste
- (1436–1439) : Renaud de Chartres
- (1439–1440) : Guillaume Charrier
- (1440–1448) : Jean de Montmorin
- (1448–1462) : Étienne de Roupt de Cambrai
- (1462–1470 or 1476) :Charles de Beaumont
- (1476–1490) : Jacques Minutoli
- (1488–1494) : Nicolas Fieschi
- (1494–1525) : Jean de Vesc

=== From 1500 ===
- (1525–1530) : Jean-Antoine de Vesc
- ((1530–1540) : Cardinal François Guillaume de Castelnau de Clermont-Lodève
- (1541–1546) : Claude de La Guiche
- (1547–1561) : Gilles Bohier
- (1561–1578) : Aimery de Saint-Sévérin

(1578–1583) : Sede vacante

- (1583–1611) : Bernard du Puy

(1611–1618) : Sede vacante

- (1618–1622) : Louis de Valois, Bishop-elect
- (1622–1629) : Balthazar de Budos de Portes
- (1629–1643) : Fulcran de Barrès
- [ (1643) : Jean Dolce ]
- (1643–1656) : François Fouquet
- (1657–1702) : Louis Fouquet
- (1702–1726) : Philibert-Charles de Pas de Feuquières
- (1726–1740) : Claude Louis de La Châtre
- (1740–1758 or 1759) : Joseph-François de Cadente de Charleval
- (1759–1794) : Charles-François-Siméon de Vermandois de Saint-Simon de Rouvroy de Sandricourt

== See also ==
- Roman Catholic Archdiocese of Montpellier
- Catholic Church in France
- List of Catholic dioceses in France

== Bibliography ==
=== Reference Works ===
- Gams, Pius Bonifatius (1873). Series episcoporum Ecclesiae catholicae: quotquot innotuerunt a beato Petro apostolo. Ratisbon: Typis et Sumptibus Georgii Josephi Manz. pp. 477–478.
- Eubel, Conradus, ed. (1913). Hierarchia catholica (in Latin). Vol. 1 (second ed.). Münster: Libreria Regensbergiana. p. 76.. Archived.
- Eubel, Conradus, ed. (1914). Hierarchia catholica (in Latin). Vol. 2 (second ed.). Münster: Libreria Regensbergiana. p. 82.. Archived.
- Gulik, Guilelmus (1923). Eubel, Conradus (ed.). Hierarchia catholica (in Latin). Vol. 3 (second ed.). Münster: Libreria Regensbergiana. p. 97.. Archived.
- Gauchat, Patritius (Patrice) (1935). Hierarchia catholica (in Latin). Vol. IV (1592-1667). Münster: Libraria Regensbergiana. p. 72..
- Ritzler, Remigius; Sefrin, Pirminus (1952). Hierarchia catholica medii et recentis aevi (in Latin). Vol. V (1667-1730). Patavii: Messagero di S. Antonio. p. 72..
- Ritzler, Remigius; Sefrin, Pirminus (1958). Hierarchia catholica medii et recentis aevi (in Latin). Vol. VI (1730-1799). Patavii: Messagero di S. Antonio. p. 69..

=== Studies ===
- Despetis, J. (1920). "Nouvelle chronologie des évêques d'Agde, d'après les Cartulaires de cette Eglise," (in French), in: Mémoires de la Société archéologique de Montpellier Deuxième série, tome VIII (Montpellier, 1920), pp. 41–101.
- Duchesne, Louis (1907). Fastes épiscopaux de l'ancienne Gaule: I. Provinces du Sud-Est (in French) (2nd ed.). Paris: Fontemoing. pp. 318–319.
- Fisquet, Honore (1864). La France pontificale (Gallia Christiana): Montpellier (in French). Paris: Etienne Repos. pp. 393–592.
- Jean, Armand (1891). Les évêques et les archevêques de France depuis 1682 jusqu'à 1801 (in French). Paris: A. Picard. pp. 254–256.
- Rastoul, A. (1912), "Agde," in: Baudrillart, Alfred (1912). Dictionnaire d'histoire et de géographie ecclésiastiques. (in French). Volume 1 (Paris: Letouzey et Ané, 1912), Pp. 926-930.
- Sainte-Marthe (Sammarathani), Denis de (1739). Gallia christiana in provincia ecclesiasticas distributa (in Latin). Vol. Tomus sextus (VI), Provincia Narbonensis. Paris: Typographia regia. pp. 664–728.
